= Neon Genesis Evangelion: Girlfriend of Steel 2nd =

2005 video game

- Developer: Gainax Network Systems
- Publisher: Broccoli
- Director: Ritsuro Hashimoto
- Producer: Yasuhiro Takeda
- Writer: Ritsuro Hashimoto
- Composer: Shirō Sagisu
- Platforms: PlayStation 2, Mac OS X, Mac OS, Windows, PlayStation Portable
- Release: JP: May 16, 2003
- Genre: Visual novel
- Mode: Single player

Neon Genesis Evangelion: Girlfriend of Steel 2nd (新世紀エヴァンゲリオン鋼鉄のガールフレンド 2nd, Shinseiki Evangerion Kōtetsu no Gārufurendo 2nd; lit. "Neon Genesis Evangelion Girlfriend of Steel 2nd"), officially romanized Neon Genesis Evangelion: The Iron Maiden 2nd, is a Gainax-produced adventure anime-style video game, and manga based on that game, set in the alternate universe seen in episode 26 of Neon Genesis Evangelion. The player controls Shinji Ikari, the hero of the original Evangelion series, as he navigates his home, school, and social life in a now-peaceful "Tokyo-3".

Each character from the original Evangelion makes an appearance but some of their circumstances and personalities have radically changed. Misato Katsuragi is now a popular homeroom teacher, and Ritsuko Akagi is the school nurse (however, these two still have their posts at Nerv from the original storyline). Asuka Langley Soryu is Shinji's childhood friend and neighbor, Kaworu Nagisa is an enigmatic playboy type who has known Shinji for years, and Rei Ayanami is a hyperactive transfer student.

Although the game's name suggests it is a sequel to the previous Evangelion visual novel Girlfriend of Steel, the story is unrelated, keeping only the gameplay. The game received a manga adaptation by Fumino Hayashi titled in English Neon Genesis Evangelion: Angelic Days. The game received a full English language fan translation in 2015.

== Gameplay ==
The game functions as a visual novel-style "additional episode". While this game features official art, backgrounds and music in the style of the original series and full-voice, it is fundamentally different from the first Girlfriend of Steel. The artwork was done by a new team, but the voices were provided by the same voice actors from the original series cast. The game also has dating sim elements and includes three "dateable" characters (Rei, Asuka, and Kaworu). Reward CG for each character can be uncovered and collected in a CG gallery accessible from the game's main menu.

In spite of its "Alternate Universe" billing, elements of the original Evangelion make appearances: plugsuits, mentions of Gendo Ikari's research in creating an artificial human being, Ritsuko's past feelings for Gendo and visual and verbal references to Angels and Evangelions. The game is available in Japanese for Mac OS, Mac OS X, Windows, PlayStation 2 and PlayStation Portable.

== Reception ==
The game sold 17,421 copies the week of its release.
