= Neon Genesis Evangelion: Angelic Days =

Manga based on the Neon Genesis Evangelion franchise

- Cover of first edition of the first volume, showing Asuka Soryu, left, and Rei Ayanami, right

新世紀エヴァンゲリオン 鋼鉄のガールフレンド2nd (Shin Seiki Evangelion Kōtetsu no Girlfriend 2nd)
- Created by: Gainax
- Manga
- Written by: Fumino Hayashi
- Published by: Kadokawa Shoten
- English publisher: NA: ADV Manga
- Magazine: Asuka
- English magazine: NA: Newtype USA
- Original run: November 2003 – December 2005
- Volumes: 6

Neon Genesis Evangelion: Girlfriend of Steel 2nd (新世紀エヴァンゲリオン 鋼鉄のガールフレンド2nd, Shin Seiki Evangelion Kōtetsu no Gārufurendo 2nd), titled as Neon Genesis Evangelion: Angelic Days in North America and Neon Genesis Evangelion: The 2nd Iron Maiden in Europe, is a manga by Fumino Hayashi based on the videogame Neon Genesis Evangelion: Girlfriend of Steel 2nd. It is a dramatization of the actions of the Instrumentality from the final episode of Neon Genesis Evangelion, which featured the show's cast in a high school romantic comedy in contrast to the dark, apocalyptic themes of the television show that inspired it. It was serialized in Japan by Kadokawa Shoten in Monthly Asuka from 2003 to 2005 and collected in 6 bound volumes.

Set on an alternate Earth, Neon Genesis Evangelion: Angelic Days continues the sequence from Episode 26 in which Shinji views a happier world where Asuka is a childhood friend, Misato is his homeroom teacher, and Rei is a new transfer student. The Evangelions and Angels make up little of the story and are not fully explained; they first appear near the end of the second volume, during which Shinji and Rei battle Sachiel. The series concludes with a much happier ending than that of the original anime.

The series is licensed in English by ADV Manga, who serialized it in Newtype USA before publishing the bound volumes.

== Plot ==
As in the original anime series, the first four volumes of the manga deal with the Angel invasions, but from a much different angle. Moreover, several more mundane sub-plot tropes common to Japanese manga occur at the same time as the invasions, such as:

- Asuka and Shinji are childhood friends, but both are reluctant to risk their friendship and form a deeper relationship. Nonetheless, Asuka becomes jealous when Rei is attracted to Shinji.
- Kensuke has an unrequited crush on Asuka, but is afraid to act because of Shinji's possible feelings. Rei is in a parallel position, with the roles reversed.
- Toji and Hikari date, even though the invasions threaten both of their lives.
- Kaworu is also a childhood friend of Shinji. However, their friendship originated from childhood incidents when Asuka abandoned Shinji, and he and Asuka never got along. By the time of the manga, Kaworu has failed to form intimate relationships with anyone besides Shinji, and resents Shinji's closer relationship with Asuka, and also tries to prevent Rei from getting closer to Shinji.
- Gendo Ikari's work schedule and cold personality alienate Shinji, who in turn resents his father's attitude towards his mother, Yui.

At the end of the fourth volume, the main characters, as Evangelion pilots, are broken up and posted to different spots around the world, although they plan to (and, with one exception, do) meet up after the Angels' threat is over and they grow too old to be pilots anymore.

The fifth volume is a flashback to Gendo and Yui's youths. This flashback presents Gendo as a violent juvenile delinquent in high school, abandoned by his parents, and he hates the world. Yui is introduced as a star student who is attracted to Gendo and helps him overcome his problems.

The sixth and final volume returns to the main story arc after the Angels' defeat, specifically the actions and fates of the characters as they grow up. The volume attempts to tie up loose ends, including:

- Rei and Ritsuko, who are stationed together, both realize their romantic feelings will remain unrequited - Rei's feelings for Shinji, and Ritsuko's feelings for Gendo.
- Misato and Kaji, who dated in college and remain good friends, review their relationship. Although they seemed to break up soon after college, they realize that they never "officially" broke up and still have feelings for each other. They agree to keep their relationship going, but not to rush anything.
- Hikari and Toji endure a long distance relationship, made complicated by the constant dangers in Toji's job.
- Shinji and Asuka, now dating, are forced to deal with strains in their relationship on their own, especially since Kaworu is (apparently) no longer around to defuse their arguments.
- Kaworu's true identity, goals, purpose, feelings, and eventual fate are hinted at during both story arcs, but are never explicitly identified. He briefly returns to show Shinji and Asuka well.

== Characters ==
The characters of Neon Genesis Evangelion: Angelic Days are alternate versions of characters in the anime series.

Shinji Ikari
Shinji Ikari is the male protagonist of the series. He is timid, quiet, and easily influenced by his peers. He is very much like his original persona, however he is more sociable and friendly than before. Shinji is also a childhood friend to Asuka Langley Soryu.
Asuka Langley Soryu
Asuka Langley Soryu is a redhead with fiery temper, and although friends with Shinji she often torments him. Her rage is especially violent in the beginning of the series: she is openly hostile with Kaworu and splashes boiling water on Shinji in a jealous fit during a cooking class. However, she cares deeply for her friends, and will aid or defend them when she is able. She has appointed herself as Shinji's chaperon and has a clear sense of right and wrong. Although she can be demanding, in truth she doesn't want to burden anyone or feel useless, especially to her parents or Shinji, similar to the original character's feeling of inferiority in the anime series.
Rei Ayanami
Rei Ayanami is an excitable extrovert, the polar opposite of her original persona. However, she is socially inept and clueless as how to perform simple tasks such as cracking an egg open. She is disliked by the girls of her class for "flirting" with boys and wearing her old uniform rather than buying the school's own regulation clothes. Flashbacks also reveal that she was given positive encouragement and praise by those who raised her.
Kaworu Nagisa
As in the anime, Kaworu Nagisa has a mysterious past that Nerv officials work to uncover. However, despite the lack of official records, Shinji remarks that he and Kaworu have been friends for about a decade, or as long as he has known Asuka. In particular, Kaworu and Shinji often perform music together (Shinji on cello, with Kaworu on violin). Also, Kaworu has what is termed an unusual "fondness" for Shinji, and sometimes appears to be part of the "love triangle" around him. His appearances in both Shinji and Gendo's story arcs strongly hints at a deep connection with the Angels.
Toji Suzuhara
Shinji's classmate, Toji Suzuhara, is one of Shinji's friends accepted into Nerv's piloting program along with him. He reciprocates Hikari's crush once she makes her feelings known to him. Much like his anime counterpart, he is shown as the tough jock of the group, and occasionally has verbal bouts with Asuka. However, he does have a much more vulnerable side; while on standby to pilot the Evangelion, he was frightened, but admitted he would risk his life for Hikari's sake.
Kensuke Aida
Kensuke Aida is another one of Shinji's classmates who is accepted into Nerv's piloting program. He has a hobby in camcording. In this incarnation, he has a crush on Asuka and is usually trying to gain some acknowledgement from her. He later openly states his feelings and then asks if he is "good enough to take Shinji's place," causing Asuka to run from him. After an exchange with Asuka while on standby, he realizes that she won't reciprocate his feelings, and later accepts his role as just a friend to her.
Misato Katsuragi
Misato Katsuragi is the homeroom teacher for Shinji and Asuka's class. Misato has some operational duties at Nerv. She also teaches cooking (so apparently she can actually cook well).
Ritsuko Akagi
Ritsuko Akagi is the school nurse, and is in love with Gendo Ikari. Ritsuko is also portrayed as the Head Medical and Science officer at Nerv.
Ryoji Kaji
Ryoji Kaji is a researcher and investigator at Nerv who looks into (among other things) Kaworu Nagisa's background. Unlike in the anime, his position is official, and he openly reports to Gendo Ikari. He and Misato dated while in college, and by his own admission, he came to Nerv to remain close to her.
Yui Ikari
Yui Ikari, Shinji's mother, is still alive and working at Nerv along with her husband Gendo and Asuka's parents. Her high school life and relationship with Gendo is chronicled in Volume 5.

== Release ==
Neon Genesis Evangelion: Angelic Days is published in Japan by Kadokawa Shoten. It was serialized in Monthly Asuka from 2003 to 2005 and collected in 6 bound volumes. It was serialized in Newtype USA from August 2005 to January 2006. It is published in English by ADV Manga, in Thailand by Siam Inter Comics, in France by Glénat, in Germany by Carlsen Comics, in Italy by Panini Comics, in Spain by Norma Editorial, in Mexico by Grupo Editorial Vid, in Argentina Editorial Ivrea, and in Brazil by Conrad Editora.

== Reception ==
MangaLife found that many of the characters were much less emotionally unstable in Angelic Days. Ed Chavez, writing for Mania Entertainment, felt that Angelic Days was "based on inconsistencies", while enjoying the high school romance comedy aspect of the manga, and being afraid for the teenagers due to the machinations of the adult characters. Internet Bookwatch describes the series as "less bleak" than the original Evangelion, but notes that the characters "still have their own personal demons to confront". As for the general public, the overall opinion on Goodreads was that the manga series was "good, light reading." and that "it is good if you are looking for snuggly interactions"

See also

- Neon Genesis Evangelion (Manga)
- Neon Genesis Evangelion: Shinji Ikari Raising Project
