= Shinji Ikari =

Character from Neon Genesis Evangelion

- Neon Genesis Evangelion character
- Shinji Ikari with his Eva-01 (in background) as a child (left), as a pilot (center), and as a student (right)
- First appearance: Neon Genesis Evangelion chapter 1: "Angel Attack" (1994)
- Created by: Gainax
- Voiced by: Japanese: Megumi Ogata; Ryūnosuke Kamiki (Adulthood, Rebuild); English: Spike Spencer (ADV Films dub / Rebuild); Casey Mongillo (Netflix dub)

In-universe information
- Full name: Shinji Ikari
- Gender: Male
- Title: Third Child
- Nationality: Japanese
- Age: 14
- Eye color: grey blue
- Notable relatives: Gendo Ikari (father); Yui Ikari (mother); Rei Ayanami (biological relative); Misato Katsuragi (guardian)

Shinji Ikari (Japanese: 碇 シンジ, Hepburn: Ikari Shinji; IPA: [iꜜkaɾʲi ɕiɲꜜdʑi]) is a fictional character and the main protagonist of the Neon Genesis Evangelion franchise, created by animation studio Gainax. In the original anime series, Shinji is a boy abandoned by his estranged father, Gendo, after the mysterious death of Shinji's mother, Yui. Years later, Gendo asks him to pilot a mecha called Evangelion Unit-01 to protect the city of Tokyo-3 from Angels, creatures that threaten to destroy humanity. Shinji appears in the franchise's feature films and related media, video games, the manga Petit Eva: Evangelion@School, the Rebuild of Evangelion films, and the manga adaptation by Yoshiyuki Sadamoto.

Director Hideaki Anno conceived Shinji as a representation of himself, reflecting his four-year depression after the airing of his previous work, Nadia: The Secret of Blue Water. The series explores Shinji's insecurity and torment through streams of consciousness and inner monologues, with episodes focusing on his introspection. Anno used psychoanalytical theories for his characterization, including the Freudian psychosexual development model. Megumi Ogata voices Shinji in Japanese, while Spike Spencer and Casey Mongillo voice him in English.

Shinji has received mixed responses from anime and manga publications. Critics have praised his complexity and realism while criticizing his insecurity and weaknesses. In contrast, critics have responded more positively to Shinji's characterization in the spin-offs and the Rebuild of Evangelion films for his courageous and self-confident personality, especially in the second installment, Evangelion: 2.0 You Can (Not) Advance. Shinji has ranked highly in popularity polls, and scholars have analyzed the character in academic studies. Merchandise based on the character, such as action figures and perfumes, has been marketed.

== Conception ==
=== Design ===
Original sketch of Shinji by Sadamoto, altered for the anime series

Neon Genesis Evangelion character designer Yoshiyuki Sadamoto drew Shinji in an ordinary summer school uniform with a white shirt, making him "an average character". He wanted a "realistic and ordinary" boy, a character "that'll be hard for others to make". Sadamoto interpreted Shinji's lack of the enthusiasm and courage of other robot-anime heroes as a different form of heroism: "Rather than a reflection of a hero, sort of a refraction of a hero". At first, he tried to create a character "that would tap into the consciousness of today's anime fans".

In one of Sadamoto's original proposals, Shinji had long hair, which would have covered his face or fluttered in the wind during the dramatic scenes. However, Sadamoto changed his mind, finding his original design "too wild". He tried for a look where one could see the forehead through the bangs, "the look of a boyish young girl", giving him girl's eyes. He modeled this version of Shinji on the titular Nadia from Nadia: The Secret of Blue Water, and designed his face to look almost identical to Nadia's but with a different hairstyle. Furthermore, writer Andrew C. McKevitt described Shinji's design, with his brown hair and blue eyes, as an example of mukokuseki (無国籍), a deliberate omission of ethnic features in the character design of Japanese fictional characters that "allowed Japanese creations to be simultaneously Western and transnational".

=== Development ===
I tried to include everything of myself in Neon Genesis Evangelion – myself, a broken man who could do nothing for four years. A man who ran away for four years, one who was simply not dead. Then one thought. "You can't run away", came to me, and I restarted this production ... I don't know what the result will be. That is because, within me, the story is not yet finished. I don't know what will happen to Shinji, Misato, or Rei. I don't know where life will take them. Because I don't know where life is taking the staff of the production.

— Hideaki Anno about Evangelion before its original airing on July 17, 1995

Neon Genesis Evangelion director Hideaki Anno experienced a four-year depression before the series began production. After the failure of Royal Space Force: The Wings of Honnêamise's sequel, Aoki Uru, Gainax started planning a new series. According to Gainax co-founder Yasuhiro Takeda, the new project borrowed ideas from Aoki Uru, including the concept of "not running away". For Takeda, the passage was "something more than just transposing one show's theme onto another... Anno inherited something from Aoki Uru — the determination not to run away from problems — and what we saw in Evangelion was maybe just a reflection of those feelings". According to Hiroki Satō, the head of Gainax's public relations office, the staff chose to focus the series on "how Shinji deals with things going on inside himself". According to Film School Rejects critic Max Covill, Noriko Takaya, the protagonist of Anno's directorial debut, Gunbuster, influenced Shinji through her moments of self-doubt and anxiety. Game Rant writer Matthew Magnus Lundeen also noted that Noriko's behavior in the first four episodes of Gunbuster foreshadows Shinji's characterization.

Anno reflected his depression in the series, conceiving a world "drenched in a vision of pessimism"; he also began production "with the wish that once the production was complete, the world and the heroes would change". He originally proposed a character similar to Asuka Langley Soryu as the protagonist, following Gainax's tradition of a female protagonist as in Gunbuster and Nadia: The Secret of Blue Water. Sadamoto objected to a new female protagonist, saying that "a robot should be piloted by a trained person, and if that person just happens to be a girl, then that is fine". However, he did not understand why a young girl "would pilot a robot". He eventually suggested a boy as the main character; his relationship with Asuka, who became another primary character, drew inspiration from Nadia's relationship with Jean. After accepting Sadamoto's proposals, Anno suggested a male protagonist after Ryū Murakami's works featured two fellow female pilots. He also gave Shinji two male friends, Tōji Suzuhara and Kensuke Aida, borrowing their names from Murakami's novel Ai to gensō no fascism. Anno named Shinji after two of his friends, including Neon Genesis Evangelion animator Shinji Higuchi. For his last name, he chose the Japanese word Ikari ("anchor"), while he derived the names of other characters in the series from nautical jargon or Japanese Imperial Navy warships.

Shinji was first conceived with slightly different features, which the staff changed over time. Originally, he was more mature, robust, and less introverted than in the final version; he was also portrayed as a studious boy, a "quiet A-student". Writer Alexandre Marine similarly noted that the staff initially conceived Shinji as braver and more rebellious than the aired version. The series would portray his scholastic conduct as a sign of passivity rather than a positive trait. According to Michael House, who was a former member of Gainax and a translator, Anno tried to find a way to end the series with a smiling Shinji and with more positive and communicative characters. However, he realized that "the characters he'd created weren't capable of whatever positive change" and could not achieve the result he had initially imagined, so he adjusted his original plans. Anno set the protagonist's age at fourteen since he considered it the age when "independence of mind starts manifesting". Anno conceived Shinji's character as a reflection of his own personality "both in [the] conscious and unconscious part". Anno therefore portrayed him as "a melancholic oral-dependent type" caught "in [an] oral stage", as Anno considered himself. Seeing Shinji as a reflection of Anno, assistant director Kazuya Tsurumaki avoided depicting him as a brave character since "Anno isn't that much of a hero". He stated that "Shinji was summoned by his father to ride a robot, Anno was summoned by Gainax to direct an animation". Gainax conceived Shinji, like other male protagonists in its series, with a weak and insecure personality. Gainax wanted to reflect the psychological state of animation fans and Japanese society, in which fathers are always at work and emotionally absent.

=== Voice ===
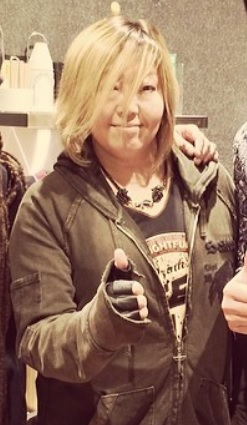
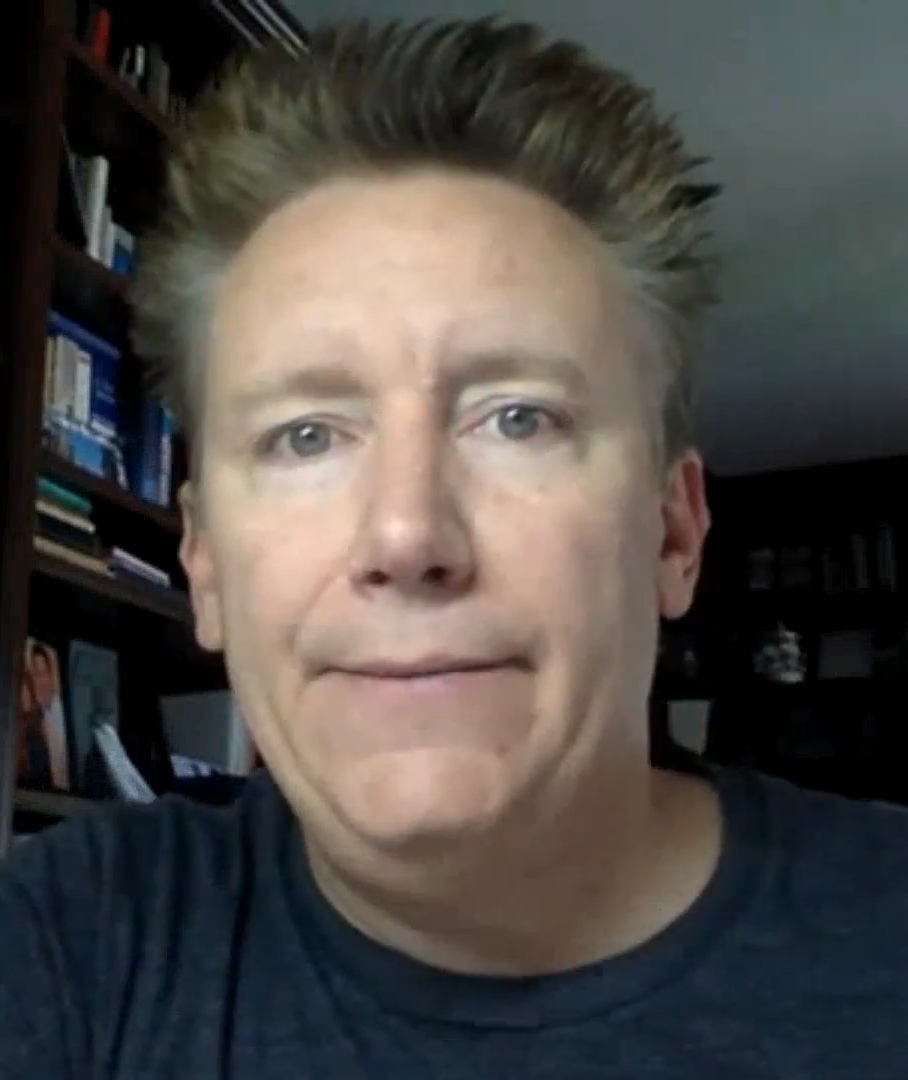
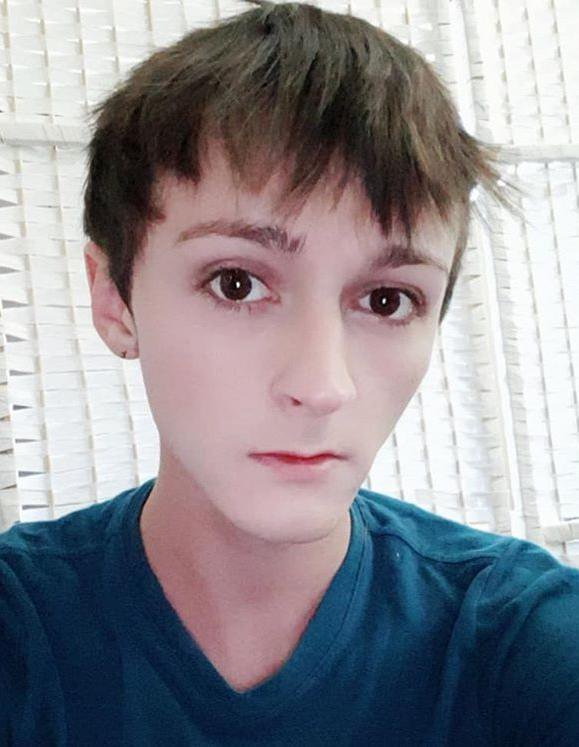
Megumi Ogata (left) is Shinji's sole Japanese actress. Spike Spencer (middle) and Casey Mongillo (right) voiced Shinji in the ADV and Netflix English dubs, respectively.

Megumi Ogata voices Shinji in the original Japanese version as well as in the films, spin-offs, video games, and the Rebuild of Evangelion film series. Ogata's agent initially refused her participation in Evangelion, and she agreed due to her status as a newcomer, but Anno directly insisted on her. She also described Shinji as one of the "most memorable" roles of her career. Portraying Shinji demanded considerable physical and psychological effort. For example, in the eighteenth episode, "Ambivalence", Shinji cries and gasps during a fight; Ogata felt like her "whole body [was] aching". She stated, "Every time a new script arrived, every time I turned a new page, I was torn apart by a new pain". While dubbing the film The End of Evangelion (1997), she tried to achieve "a higher synchronization rate with the general director than the TV series". According to Ogata, Shinji "didn't act like an anime character, but typically talked very quietly and sparingly, and it was like he was suddenly thrust into an anime world".

The Rebuild of Evangelion acting also presented obstacles. On the last day of recording for the film Evangelion: 2.0 You Can (Not) Advance (2009), Ogata had to scream again; she collapsed on the studio floor, and Anno sat with her. He praised her work and shook her hand, thanking her for "keeping the character's feelings unchanged" and for adding her thirteen years of experience "to the current Shinji". In the following film, Evangelion: 3.0 You Can (Not) Redo (2012), in which the rest of the cast treats Shinji coldly, Ogata stated that she felt like him and experienced emotional pain. She first saw the scene in which Kaworu Nagisa reveals to Shinji the conditions of planet Earth in her home when the staff had yet to animate it. The recordings took place in March 2012, and she associated the destroyed landscape of the film with images of the 2011 Tōhoku earthquake and tsunami, imagining that the catastrophe was her fault. During the pre-score, the drawings for Kaworu's death scene were unclear in the animatic, and the staff animated the keyframes during the recording touch-ups. Ogata was shocked when she performed the scene and stated that her interpretation could reflect her emotional state, making the experience "kind of traumatic". For the final installment, Evangelion: 3.0+1.0 Thrice Upon a Time (2021), Ogata played a larger role in the plot's development. Anno felt that his current self had grown closer to Gendo and had consequently lost touch with Shinji's perspective, so he needed Ogata's input. He also thought that the only people who could recognize Shinji's feelings were Ogata herself and his assistant, Ikki Todoroki. Ogata also recounted that Anno had asked her what sort of ending she would prefer "as Shinji". Ryūnosuke Kamiki voices Shinji's adult self in the film.

Spike Spencer and Casey Mongillo voiced Shinji in the English dubs by ADV and Netflix, respectively. Academic scholar Philip Brophy noted that Spike Spencer's performance portrays Shinji "as cocky when engaged in battle and petulant when having to acknowledge forced beyond his control". Spencer said he felt frustrated with Shinji because, in his view, the character fails to evolve and "keeps sliding back". He also expressed confusion about the series finale, saying that he struggled to understand the meaning of the events. Spencer also noted that Shinji avoids completely taking "the weak path" because "when he gets in the Evangelion, he kicks ass", and by the nineteenth episode, he lets go of his emotions: "You can't discount the fact that he's kind of a wuss when it comes to girls and talking to other people, but he's a warrior. ... The world's still here, and it's thanks to him."

== Appearances ==
=== Neon Genesis Evangelion ===
Shinji is the only child of Gendo Rokubungi and Yui Ikari, a student at Kyoto University who became a researcher. When he was three, Yui brought Shinji to the Gehirn research center in Hakone to see Evangelion 01's first activation test. During the ensuing accident, however, his mother disappeared before his eyes; after the accident, Gendo left Shinji with a guardian for about ten years. After becoming commander of the Nerv special agency, Gendo invites Shinji to Tokyo-3 to pilot Evangelion Unit-01 and protect the city from creatures called Angels. Shinji reluctantly agrees and fights against the Angel Sachiel. After the Angel attack, Shinji starts to live with Misato Katsuragi, a Nerv officer and his new guardian, and attends school in Tokyo-3; after his arrival, he gradually changes and befriends Toji Suzuhara and Kensuke Aida. When the Angel Ramiel tries to destroy Nerv headquarters in the episode "Rei II", Shinji and fellow pilot Rei Ayanami work together to kill it. After Ramiel's defeat, a nuclear-powered machine called Jet Alone and designed to fight the Angels runs amok in "A Human Work", and he and Misato stop it; during this time, Shinji gradually changes his attitude, trying to be more open and spontaneous. He also meets Asuka Langley Soryu, an Eva pilot from Germany, and in the eighth episode, they defeat the Angel Gaghiel together.

In the second third of the series, Shinji, Rei, and Asuka face more Angels, and Shinji begins bonding with his peers, especially Asuka, becoming more confident and assertive. When they are sent to fight the Angel Leliel in "Splitting of the Breast", Shinji, receiving praise from Gendo and improving his synchronization scores, accepts his role as an Evangelion pilot. He decides to attack on his own but Leliel sucks him into a parallel universe called the Dirac Sea, and within it, he confronts the Angel and his inner self; Yui, whose soul resides within the Eva, frees him from the Angel. After the Angel Bardiel takes control of Eva-03, trapping his classmate Toji Suzahara inside, Shinji has to fight the unit and decides to quit Nerv. Meanwhile, the Angel Zeruel mutilates the other Evangelion units and defeats Rei and Asuka. After talking with his mentor and Misato's lover, Ryoji Kaji, Shinji returns to Nerv to protect the city. He merges with his unit and frees the Evangelion; however, its core traps him for a month. Rei sacrifices herself in the battle against the Angel Armisael to save Shinji, and Nerv replaces her with a new clone in the episode "Rei III". Asuka runs away and falls into a coma, and Toji and Kensuke flee Tokyo-3. These events cause Shinji to fall into depression. In the twenty-fourth episode, he meets Kaworu Nagisa, Asuka's substitute pilot, and they bond. Shinji discovers that Kaworu is the final Angel, and kills him. After Kaworu's death, Instrumentality begins, and the souls of humanity unite in a collective consciousness. Shinji confronts his traumas and why he acts the way he does. After talking with most of the Evangelion cast and seeing a version of himself in a world where he leads a normal life, Shinji becomes aware of his potential and realizes the importance of his thoughts. The rest of the cast congratulates him.

=== The End of Evangelion ===
The 1997 film The End of Evangelion continues Shinji's story, portraying his downward spiral into depression and the loss of his will to live. Shinji visits a comatose Asuka in the hospital, and when his pleas for attention go unanswered, he masturbates over her body. He remains catatonic while an attack kills all Nerv personnel, including Misato. He then decides to pilot the Eva to save those still alive while Asuka is on the surface fighting the Mass Production Evas. However, he fails to reach her in time, and when he learns about Asuka's defeat, the Evangelion moves on its own to let him reenter it. After seeing the mutilated corpse of Asuka's Unit-02, Shinji's intense emotions summon a spear called the Lance of Longinus to Earth, and the Eva becomes a tree of life. Shinji then has long dreamlike exchanges with Misato, Rei, and Asuka about the pain of reality and his tensions with them. When he begs for Asuka's attention, and she refuses him, arguing he only wants to use her as a crutch, Shinji begins Instrumentality, and unites humanity's souls into a single existence. After re-evaluating his position, he decides to live in a world where other people exist and returns to Earth, allowing other humans to return. Shinji, having placed grave markers in memory of most of the other characters, awakens sometime later, with Asuka lying next to him on a post-apocalyptic shore. He suddenly tries to strangle her but stops and breaks down when she regains consciousness and caresses his face.

=== Rebuild of Evangelion ===
[Eva] is a story where the main character witnesses many horrors with his own eyes but still tries to stand up again. It is a story of will; a story of moving forward, if only just a little. It is a story of fear, where someone who must face indefinite solitude fears reaching out to others but still wants to try.

— Hideaki Anno, announcing the Rebuild of Evangelion movies

In Rebuild of Evangelion, Shinji returns as the central protagonist; in Evangelion: 1.0 You Are (Not) Alone (2007), the first installment of the saga, his role is similar to that in the anime series. Nerv assigns him to pilot Unit-01, and he works with Rei to defeat the Sixth Angel. In the second installment, Evangelion: 2.0 You Can (Not) Advance (2009), Shinji reluctantly continues his duties as the pilot of Unit-01. After the battle with the Ninth Angel, when his father forces his Unit-01 to critically injure Asuka, Shinji retires from his duties and leaves Nerv. When the Tenth Angel consumes Rei, Shinji returns and defeats the Angel; however, his decisions nearly trigger the Third Impact. Shinji seemingly saves Rei by fusing with the Evangelion.

In the third film, Evangelion: 3.0 You Can (Not) Redo (2012), set fourteen years later, Shinji awakens to a world completely changed by the Third Impact, and Misato and the others treat him with hostility. They place an explosive device named DSS Choker on his neck, which they will activate if he comes close to starting another Impact. After learning from Misato that they are part of Wille, a new organization fighting Nerv, Shinji leaves when Rei appears. At the remnants of Nerv, Shinji meets Kaworu Nagisa, the pilot of Eva-13, who befriends him. He becomes despondent after Kaworu tells him that humanity holds him responsible for initiating the Third Impact. After Shinji realizes that he failed to save Rei and that the new Rei is a clone, Nagisa convinces him to pilot Eva-13 with him. While confronting Asuka and Mari, Shinji begins a Fourth Impact; Eva-13 eats the twelfth Angel and ascends to divinity. The DSS Choker that Kaworu took from Shinji kills him as he tries to stop the Fourth Impact. Devastated by these events, Shinji loses his will to live. Asuka rescues him from his Entry Plug, berating him for acting "like a baby". The Rei clone appears and follows them as they wander through the devastated landscape.

In Evangelion: 3.0+1.0 Thrice Upon a Time (2021), the last installment of the saga, Shinji, still distraught over Kaworu's death, wanders without a will to live with Asuka and Rei. With the two companions, he reaches a protected citadel called Village-3, where survivors of the various Impacts live in isolation from the outside world. Shinji meets his old classmates, Toji, Kensuke, and Hikari Horaki, and, with help from Asuka and Rei, gradually regains the will to live. He then decides to leave with Asuka and the other members of Wille for Antarctica, where he boards Eva-01 to face his father, Gendo, and his Eva-13. Unable to defeat Gendo with brute force, Shinji decides to talk to him instead. Gendo apologizes to Shinji and embraces him, and Shinji finds himself in a reborn world. On a beach, he meets Mari Illustrious Makinami, saying goodbye to all the Evangelions. Shortly after, a visibly grown Shinji appears at a station; Mari comes to meet him, and the two of them walk together into a new world, holding hands. Mechademia scholar Nicolle Lamerichs observed that the film depicts Shinji through pencil drawings; while the film initially emphasizes the distance between him and Gendo, the narrative later shifts toward showing empathy for Gendo and ultimately provides a happy resolution for both characters.

=== Manga ===
In Yoshiyuki Sadamoto's Neon Genesis Evangelion manga adaptation, Shinji's characterization differs. Sadamoto tried to portray him as more of a misfit, a young teenager who is more stubborn, rebellious, juvenile, and apathetic than Hideaki Anno's insecure character. In the anime's fourth episode, "Hedgehog's Dilemma", Shinji runs away from home because he is overwhelmed by responsibility; in the manga, he runs away because he realizes that Misato is spying on him and documenting his every move. After the battle against Bardiel, in which his friend Toji dies following an order from Commander Ikari, Shinji tries to punch his father. He has a close relationship with Rei in the manga, and Kaji acts more as a mentor to him. Shinji's relationship with Kaworu is troubled in the manga; he accuses Kaworu of being cynical and strange. The manga also modifies his backstory, introducing an unnamed aunt, uncle, and cousins, and showing memories of his childhood away from Gendo. It also depicts a different version of Instrumentality, with Shinji saving Asuka during her fight against the Mass Production Evangelions. In the end, Shinji leads a normal life in a reformed world and encounters Asuka while waiting for a train.

Sadamoto decided to work on an Evangelion manga when he saw Shinji in the first episodes of the original series. He wondered "what the world looked like through Shinji's eyes". In the anime, Shinji's motto is "I must not run away", but Sadamoto chose "being honest with themselves" as the main theme for the manga. This led Sadamoto to change Shinji's characterization and psychology. He wanted to reflect contemporary teenagers in the character and drew inspiration from the Gulf War, wondering how a 14-year-old would have behaved in a helicopter. Sadamoto also drew upon his experiences as an adolescent, saying that his characterization was "more like a flunk-out" than Anno's version. He conceived Shinji with a "clean image that a woman tends to project" in his mind, portraying him as a "cold, unambitious" character, "the type who would commit suicide but can't bring himself to do it" and trying to design a character from the more stoic part of himself. He stated, "It was my intention to create a wistful character who had given up on life". Sadamoto described Anno's approach as portraying a twisted person who puts on a "cool face" to hide their insanity. Sadamoto perceived his approach as the opposite; Sadamoto described his characters as stoic and earnest but with a twisted outside, "just like a child". He also described his Shinji as a character who refuses to listen but "still makes the right decision".

=== In other media ===
In a scene from the last episode, the series presents an alternate universe, which has a different story from the previous episodes; in this parallel reality, Shinji lives with both his parents and is a normal middle-school student. He is also a protagonist in Shinji Ikari Raising Project and Neon Genesis Evangelion: Angelic Days, which portray him as happier and more stable than his anime counterpart. Neon Genesis Evangelion: Girlfriend of Steel 2nd also uses this characterization. Spin-offs and video games allow players to pair Shinji romantically with Asuka Langley Soryu, Rei Ayanami, Kaworu, and other characters, including his classmate Hikari Horaki and original characters such as Mana Kirishima, an extrovert transfer student first introduced in the video game Neon Genesis Evangelion: Girlfriend of Steel, and Mayumi Yamagishi, an introverted girl in the video game Neon Genesis Evangelion: 2nd Impression. In Neon Genesis Evangelion: Shinji Ikari Raising Project, Shinji appears as a childhood friend of Asuka and a distant cousin of Rei Ayanami. In Petit Eva: Evangelion@School, Shinji appears as a boy "frightened by the idea of growing up" but popular among the students of Tokyo-3's Municipal Nerv High School. In Evangelion: Detective Shinji Ikari, Kaji and Kaworu work as private investigators, and Shinji asks them to help him investigate a mysterious case.

In Neon Genesis Evangelion: Anima, set three years after The End of Evangelion with a different Instrumentality scenario, Shinji is 17 years old; he lets his hair grow and is a good friend of Rei and Asuka. He first pilots the Evangelion Unit-01 Type-F and, after Eva0.0 (Quatre) attacks and his soul merges with Eva-01, pilots the mecha Super Evangelion and its upgrades. In addition to video games based on the original animated series, Shinji appears in media outside the Evangelion franchise, such as Monster Strike, Tales of Zestiria, Puzzle & Dragons, The Battle Cats, and a crossover episode of Shinkansen Henkei Robo Shinkalion, in which Ogata voices him and he pilots a 500 Type Eva transformable train. For Shinkalion, Ogata voiced him as a more "level-headed" character. He is a playable character in the Super Robot Wars crossover video-game franchise, where he and other Evangelion characters work with characters from other mecha series. Shinji develops crushes on different characters, such as Lynn Minmay, sparking jealousy in Asuka, who tries to recapture his attention. In other games, Eva Unit-01 goes berserk after fighting the fourth Angel, and Shinji fights Koji Kabuto and Mazinger Z. He later rejoins the battle against the Angels with Rei Ayanami.

== Characterization and themes ==
Shinji is a dependent and introverted boy with few friends and low self-esteem, who struggles to communicate with others. He tends to be apologetic and passive in his relationships and fears human contact. He also lets others choose his clothes and wears what they provide. Unlike a stereotypical hero, particularly one from the mecha genre, Shinji is more apathetic and reluctant than courageous. Character designer Sadamoto conceived him as "the kind of character who would encase himself in a shell of his own making". Director Hideaki Anno described him as a "cowardly young man" who has convinced himself that "he is a completely unnecessary person" after his father, Gendo, abandoned him. According to writer Gerald Alva Miller, Shinji craves acceptance and is concerned about how others perceive him, but "he also remains incapable of accepting love from others". His childhood trauma leads him to doubt the value of his existence, to be disheartened, and to seek a raison d'être; he also repeatedly questions why he pilots Eva-01 in the latter part of the series. In a stream of consciousness from the last two episodes, which focus on his path and psyche, he admits being afraid of himself and his father. Despite the tension between him and his father, however, Shinji yearns to trust him. He also pilots Eva-01 to gain the approval of others, particularly Gendo, instead of pursuing heroic or idealistic goals. Despite this, assistant director Kazuya Tsurumaki noted that Shinji acts in opposition to the conventional impression of him: "He is not cowardly and indecisive; he is obstinate and doesn't pay any mind to other people." Anno described him as "both an introvert and righteous" boy who tends to categorize things, a character who tends to hide something "like a way to escape from that closure". Furthermore, according to Sadamoto, fans perceive him as darker than he actually is; except for The End of Evangelion, where Sadamoto described him as "pretty dark and introspective", he never got the impression of a dark character in the original series. According to Ogata, at the film's end, Shinji grows up, naturally closing his path from childhood to adulthood.

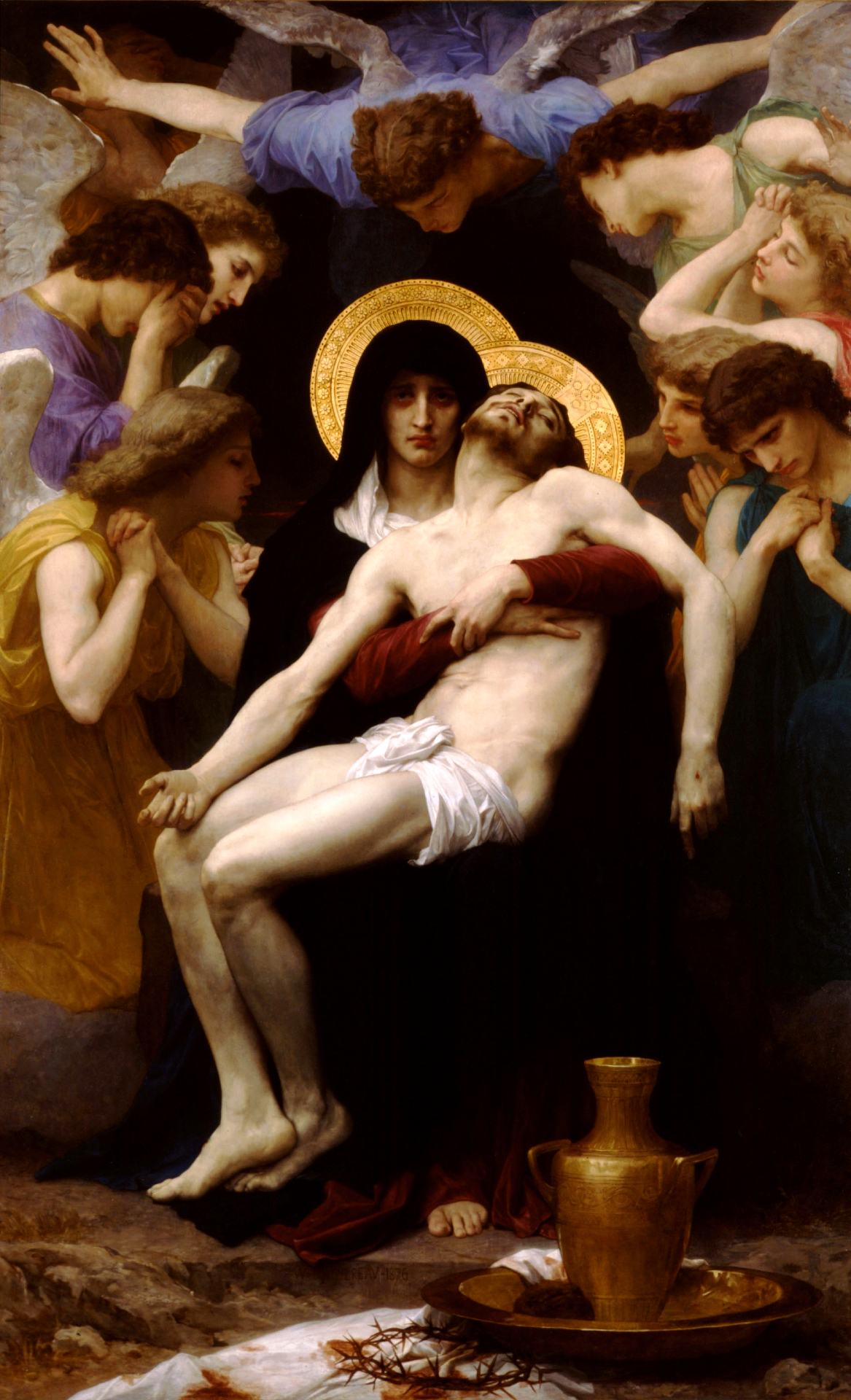
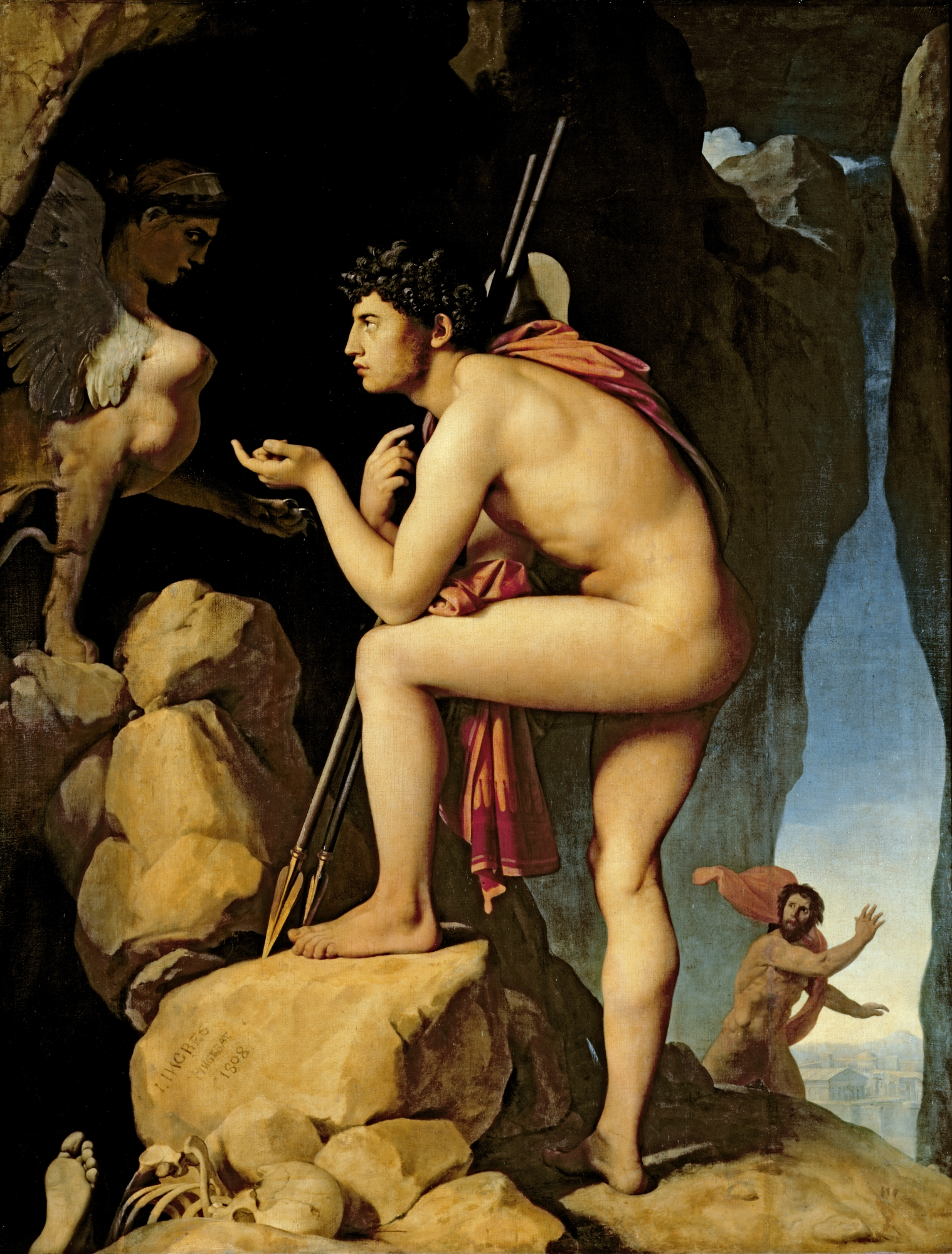
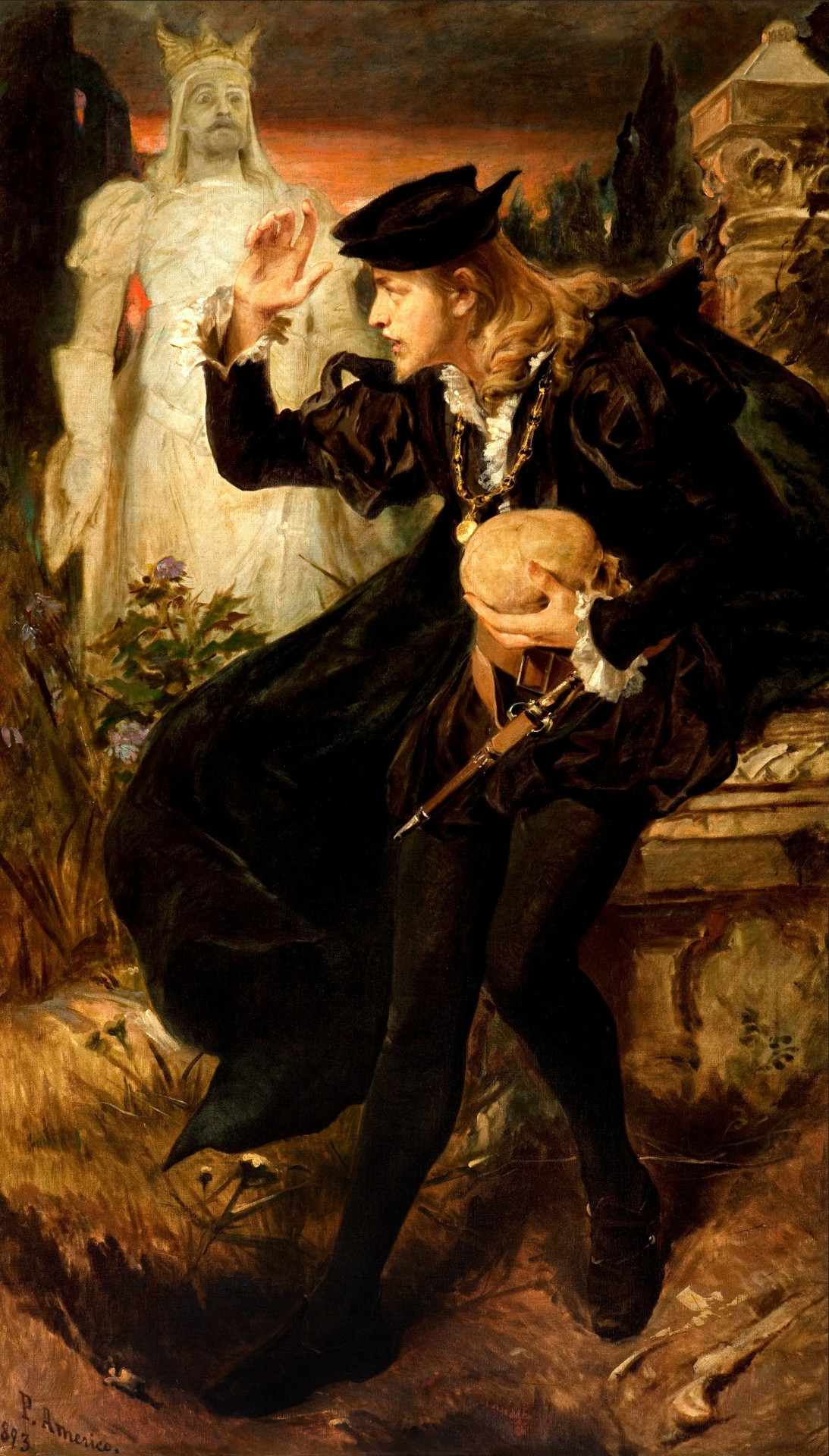
Critics have compared Shinji to religious and literary figures, such as Jesus, Oedipus, and Hamlet.

Writer Paul M. Malone compared him to the German jurist and writer Daniel Paul Schreber, noting "a surprising degree of intertextuality" with his Memoirs of My Nervous Illness. However, he did not consider Evangelion to be based directly on his Memoirs. Malone, following Japanese critic and writer Kotani Mari, described Shinji as an effeminate and androgynous character. According to Mari, Shinji becomes effeminate throughout the story, and she characterized him as a "female savior". Other critics described him as a messianic figure. Writers Kazuhisa Fujie and Martin Foster noted that his name in kanji 神児 (shinji) can be translated as "child of God", linking him to Jesus Christ. Critics have also likened him to Oedipus. Writer and animation critic Patrick Drazen similarly compared the dilemma Shinji faces in the twenty-fourth episode against the Angel Tabris to that of Hamlet, the protagonist of Shakespeare's tragedy of the same name.

Critics interpreted Shinji as an alter ego of the series director, Hideaki Anno, and as an otaku. IGN's Ramsey Isler interpreted his feelings as a reflection of Anno's mood; according to him, Anno "went through a serious bout of depression while making the show and, like a true artist, he poured all of that emotion and despair into his work". Isler also interpreted his characterization and battles against the Angels as a metaphor for Anno's attempts "to defeat his own personal demons". Assistant director Tsurumaki gave a similar interpretation, working on the series with the idea that Shinji's emotions are a reflection of Anno's feelings: "That's why in the scenario planning sessions, I was always saying something like, 'Isn't that a little too hero-like for Shinji to say? Hideaki Anno isn't that much of a hero'". Tsurumaki also thought that only "Japanese fans of this generation" could understand Shinji. Japanese sociologist Tsutomu Hashimoto interpreted Shinji as an heir to the Japanese society of the seventies and eighties, which pursued freedom from social constraints and authoritarian father figures; the sociologist cited the musician Yutaka Ozaki as a symbol of this search for freedom since he tried to escape from the impositions of the school system and he eventually "returned" to the mother figure. Hashimoto also compared Shinji's final choice, in which he rejects the Instrumentality Project desired by the authoritarian father Gendo, to the concept of liberalism, which prescribes respect for each individual's identity.

After he arrives in Tokyo-3, Shinji repeats, "I mustn't run away" to face his responsibilities, and the sentence becomes one of the character's recurring mantras. In the twentieth episode, he remembers escaping from the experimental site where his mother died. This event instilled in him the idea of "not running away", which an official pamphlet describes as "compulsive". In an interview, Anno said that, contrary to fans' interpretation, the theme of the series is not about "not having to run away", since "It's ok to run away"; according to him, "it's perfectly fine" to run away sometimes and that "There are things that you gain and things that you lose running away, after all. Although, if you don't pick something, then there are times when you get neither. That's the same as with dying". Anno added the line "You can run away" following a discussion with Sadamoto, who noted that many novels inspired by psychotherapy presented the idea that it was acceptable to run away; Anno ultimately used Sadamoto's exact words in the episode. Hiroki Azuma, a Japanese philosopher and cultural critic, speaking of Shinji's motto, "I mustn't run away", described Evangelion as a story that depicts "anxiety without a cause", linking this feeling to the repercussions of the Aum Shinrikyō attack. Azuma also described Shinji and other characters in the series as "stereotypical characters" through which Anno succeeded in portraying the nineties. Psychiatrist Kōji Mizobe described him as a dependent boy who struggles to communicate but also argued that Shinji's fundamental characteristic was his sociability, describing him as a "sympathetic person" who accepts and imitates others. Mizobe interpreted a scene from the ninth episode, in which he synchronizes with Asuka's movements on a train, as proof of this ability. He also interpreted Evangelion as a story in which the main characters try to build stable identities, arguing that Shinji and Asuka's communication problems explained why younger Japanese viewers continued to identify with the characters years after the series first aired.

Critics analyzed the conflict-ridden relationship between Shinji and his father, comparing him to the protagonists of director Yoshiyuki Tomino's works, especially Amuro Ray, the main character of Mobile Suit Gundam. Artist Takashi Murakami interpreted Shinji's interior drama as "the endpoint of the postwar lineage of otaku favorites", such as Godzilla, the Ultra franchise, Space Battleship Yamato, or Gundam, in which hero-figures increasingly question and agonize over their missions to defend Earth and humanity. According to Toshio Okada, former president of Gainax and an acquaintance of Hideaki Anno, Evangelion and Gundam differ completely; for Okada, one thrust of Gundam's story is "the main character's desire to be recognized by others" since in mecha anime, the characters generally try to change the world. By contrast, Evangelion "complicated the whole thing, raising issues" since no one can save the world. According to Italian researcher Fabio Bartoli, Shinji is a "perfect representative" of the otaku generation. He described him as "a young man with relationship difficulties, accustomed to spending a lot of time at home". Bartoli wrote that the last scene of the anime, in which the boy's glass prison shatters, ending his psychoanalytic session, may allude to the shinjinrui (新人類; lit. "new human race"), the Japanese generation born in the 1970s, also called crystal-zoku (クリスタル族; lit. "crystal tribe"). Writer Andrea Fontana agreed, seeing him as a representation of otaku and their inability to relate to others. Fontana also saw in Shinji's character "an exhortation" by Anno to otaku, Japanese society, and young people "to break the crystal cage in which they locked themselves up, looking confidently at their neighbor". Scholar Nikolai Afanasov compared him to hikikomori and described him as the face of Japan's Lost Generation, which lost faith in itself and its future. Other critics associated the character with the youth and climate of 1990s Japan, shaken by the Tokyo subway sarin attack operated by the Japanese sect Aum Shinrikyō, the Great Hanshin earthquake, and the bursting of the Japanese asset price bubble. Animator and Evangelion staff member Mitsuo Iso expressed a similar view.

=== Psychoanalysis ===
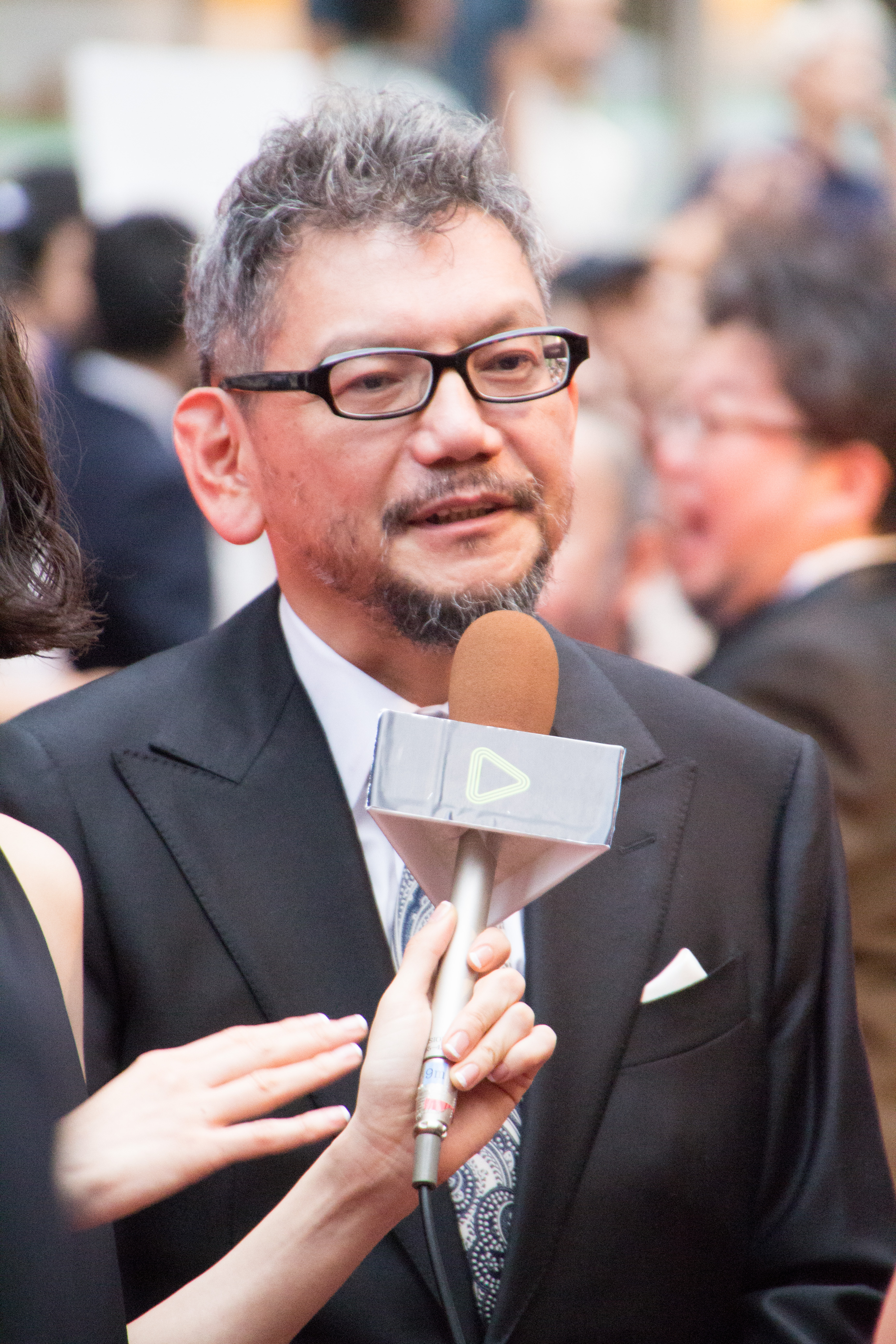
"[Shinji] shrinks from human contact. And he tries to live in a closed world where his behavior dooms him, and he has abandoned the attempt to understand himself. ... Both [Shinji and Misato] are extremely afraid of being hurt. Both are unsuitable-lacking the positive attitude-for what people call heroes of an adventure". – Hideaki Anno

Commentators have linked Shinji's personality traits to psychiatric conditions, such as depressive disorder, anxiety, social phobia, and borderline personality disorder. Walter Veit of Psychology Today linked his passive attitude in the first episodes to Jean-Paul Sartre's existentialist concept of bad faith and Albert Camus's "philosophical suicide". Gualtiero Cannarsi, editor of the Italian adaptation of the series, noted that Shinji struggles to make friends and displays a cold, reserved attitude in the third episode, "A Transfer". Like the porcupines of Arthur Schopenhauer's Parerga and Paralipomena, Shinji fears being hurt and therefore withdraws from human contact, a condition Schopenhauer described as the porcupine's dilemma. Shinji's relationship with Misato Katsuragi follows Schopenhauer's concept; Cannarsi also noted that in the fourth episode, "Hedgehog's Dilemma", the characters grow closer without hurting each other. Schopenhauer originally named his concept after the porcupine, or Hystricidae (Stachelschweine in German). The staff instead chose an alternative translation for the installment's title to portray Shinji as a hedgehog, an animal with smaller, blunter spines than a porcupine, which suggests the character's greater delicacy.

Critics noted that, after losing his mother in a traumatic accident, Shinji seeks a substitute in the women around him and in Eva-01, which contains her soul. Academic Susan J. Napier also interpreted the Angels as "father figures, whom Shinji must annihilate". Anime News Network reviewer Mike Crandol noted that Shinji depends on Unit-01 in the first part of the series, becoming negatively affected by the symbiotic relationship. Crandol described his entry into Eva-01 as a Freudian "return to the womb" and his struggle to be free of the Eva as his "rite of passage" into manhood. Anno also described Shinji as a boy with a strong Oedipus complex in relation to his father, Gendo. The Oedipal triangle is completed by their common interest in Rei Ayanami, a genetic clone of Yui Ikari. According to him, Shinji symbolically "kills" his father "and steals his mother from him". Scholar Betty Stojnic similarly identified a pronounced Oedipus complex in Shinji's relationship with Yui, as he is "entirely driven by the anxious relationship he has with his father and by the absence of his mother".

Yūichirō Oguro, the editor of supplemental materials included in the Japanese edition of the series, interpreted Neon Genesis Evangelion's plot as an Oedipal story. Eva-01 can be seen as a maternal breast and a source of ambivalence for the character. To manage this ambivalence, Shinji "split the breast" into a good and a bad breast. Oguro described berserk Unit-01 as a "bad breast"; conversely, he interpreted Yui as a "good breast" that eventually saves Shinji during the battles with the Angels, as in his fight against Leliel in the sixteenth episode, named "Splitting of the Breast" in reference to psychoanalytic theory. In the twentieth episode, "Weaving a Story 2: oral stage", Shinji is trapped in Eva-01, dissolving into its cockpit; in a stream of consciousness, he has visions linked to the Freudian oral stage, which include Yui breastfeeding him. With his mother's help, Shinji is symbolically reborn, finding the will to live and regaining his body. He also displays features linked to oralism, a personality type associated with dependent, weak individuals who see other people as tools to satisfy their needs. According to Freudian theory, oral personalities received inadequate nourishment during weaning. For Oguro, Shinji resolves his oral fixation through the vision of his mother's breast, becoming a more self-aware individual. In the last two episodes, he also sees the good and bad sides of other people; Anno himself compared him to a child and his ambivalent relationship with his mother during the oral stage. Shinji's Oedipus complex then resolves in the final episode, which ends with the captions "To my father, thank you" and "To my mother, goodbye", indicating his entry into adulthood. In The End of Evangelion, he also chooses to live with other human beings, rejecting Human Instrumentality and accepting others.

== Cultural impact ==
=== Popularity ===
Shinji's character has been popular in Japan. His popularity was also reflected in polls even years after the anime's first airing. After the series' first run, Shinji ranked second among the "most popular male characters of the moment" in an Animage magazine Grand Prix poll. In the rankings for the following two years, he rose to first place. In the 1997 Anime Grand Prix, Shinji received around 1,200 votes, more than double the number received by the runner-up. Megumi Ogata finished second in the voice-actor rankings for three years. Shinji also appeared in the magazine's monthly surveys, remaining in the top 20 in 1996, 1997, and 1998. In 1998, Animage ranked him 21st among the 100 most popular anime characters and 55th in 1999.

In 1998, Shinji ranked first among the best "dark characters" in a survey by Animedia magazine, and the magazine itself praised his complexity. He also appeared in the periodical's annual popularity rankings in 2006 and from 2008 to 2010, consistently placing among the top ten. He placed 77th in a 2002 TV Asahi poll ranking the most popular anime characters of all time and 25th in a 2007 list of the most popular male heroes. Shinji also topped Newtype magazine's popularity charts, finishing third and first in August and September 2009, respectively. He finished third in October, becoming the most popular Evangelion male character on the list. In March 2010, a new Newtype survey ranked him as the most popular male character of the 1990s. In 2014, foreigners living in Japan were asked: "Which character do you aspire to look like?". Shinji ranked seventh in the survey. In 2012, Fuji TV asked about 14,000 fans to name the "best anime hero", and Shinji finished twentieth. In 2016, he finished thirteenth in an Anime News Network poll of the "strongest pilots" in Japanese animation. In April 2021, after the release of the final Rebuild film, he finished as the second most popular male character in a Newtype poll, taking fifth place in May and first place in June.

=== Critical reception ===
[Shinji] is one of the most nuanced, popular, and relatable characters in anime history. Interestingly, he's also a punchable, sniveling little whiner. But you know what? We've all been there. We don't like Shinji because of what he represents in ourselves: that part of us that is prone to giving up and abandoning personal responsibilities because life is unfair and we think we should just be able to rely on other people to make everything better for us while ignoring the fact that those other people have their own problems. But at the same time as we dislike Shinji and what he reminds us of, we understand him entirely.

— Nick Verboon, Unreality Magazine

The character evoked mixed opinions, dividing anime critics. Some criticized Shinji's insecurities, vulnerability, and lack of temper and resoluteness. Pete Harcoff, a reviewer for the Anime Critic website, praised Neon Genesis Evangelion but criticized Shinji as ineffective and disappointing. THEM Anime Reviews regarded the character's constant angst in the television series as a negative trait. Raphael See found Evangelion "a little cliche, or just plain irritating at times" and criticized Shinji's pessimism. Japanator listed him among "characters with no chance in reality", saying that "he really sucks as an Eva pilot, and he has the spine of a jellyfish". Comic Book Resources also criticized Shinji as a stereotypical talented male protagonist with a harem. Anime scholar Nikolai Afanasov argued that Shinji "does not elicit sympathy", since his depression and lack of self-confidence alienate the audience, but he still remains "a popular and recognizable fixture of mass culture".

Other critics praised the character's realism. According to Anime News Network's Nick Creamer, "every element of Shinji's emotional journey is conveyed with clear sympathy and brutal specificity". According to Susan J. Napier, Shinji "still wins the championship for most psychologically complex (or just plain neurotic) male character ever created". Critics also described him as one of the most relatable male anime characters. IGN editor Chris Mackenzie ranked him the twenty-fifth best anime character of all time. Similarly, Anime Invasion magazine's Jen Contino praised Shinji's characterization and rated him the ninth-best anime character of all time. In 2013, Anime News Network editor Lynzee Lamb ranked him first among seven "crybaby heroes" in Japanese animation but praised his motivation and psychological realism. IGN's Ramsey Isler called him the "greatest anime character" of all time, praising his originality and realistic characterization. Isler concluded, "He's a character that challenges the audience by not giving them a superficial, vicarious power fantasy like you'd get from so many other anime. He is pathetic, but that is what makes him great. That is what makes him a genuine work of art".

Shinji's role in the Rebuild of Evangelion films was better received, with reviewers praising his more open characterization. Martin Theron of Anime News Network, reviewing Evangelion 1.0: You Are (Not) Alone, praised Shinji's realism. Theron called the scene in Evangelion: 2.22 You Can (Not) Advance where Shinji saves Rei the "Best Scene" in the website's "Best (and Most Notable) of 2011": "This is the first time in the entire franchise that he wholeheartedly goes after something because he wants it, rather than because he's expected to or has no choice." Despite criticizing the third film, several reviewers praised Shinji's interactions with Kaworu. Nicole MacLean of THEM Anime Reviews criticized their relationship, finding it "rushed", artificial, and unclear. Comic Book Resources writer Daniel Kurland also praised his role in the final installment, Evangelion: 3.0+1.0 Thrice Upon a Time, writing: "Shinji deserves happiness, and it makes Thrice Upon A Time the more powerful conclusion that it finally allows Shinji to reach this point and not leave him in existential dread".

=== Legacy ===
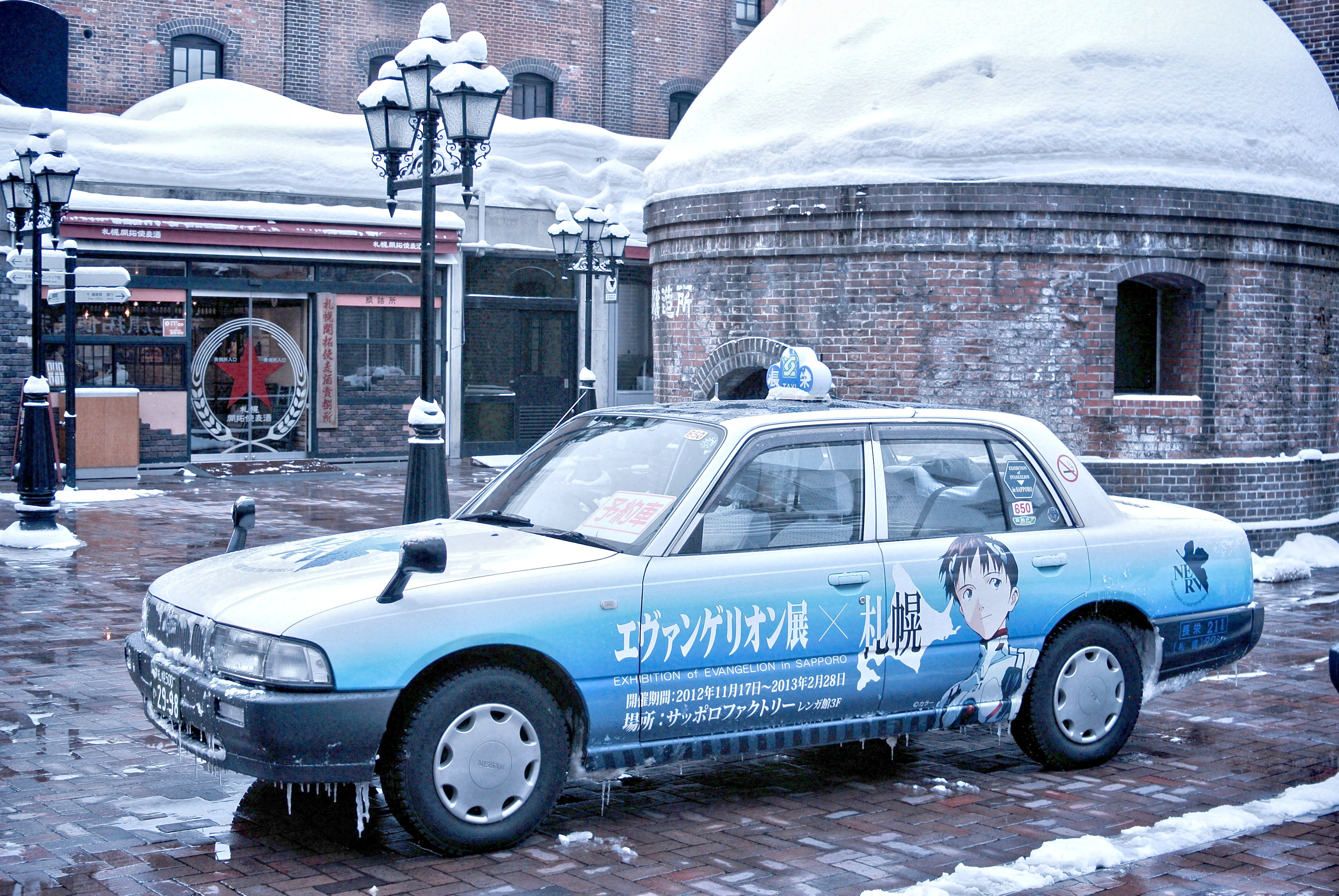
Shinji-decorated taxi in Sapporo

Shinji-themed merchandise has been released, including clothing, action figures, collectible models, perfumes, and drinks. The character has been used in advertising campaigns for the Japan Racing Association and a food company specializing in miso soup; the "Shijimi from Lake Shinji" campaign was commercially successful. Movic has also released a drama cassette featuring him as part of its Animate series devoted to other popular works.

With Shinji Ikari, Neon Genesis Evangelion significantly influenced Japanese animation by presenting a more realistic, insecure, and fragile protagonist than those of earlier mecha series. Guilty Crown staff member Ryo Ōyama compared the series' protagonist, Shū Ōma, to Shinji, saying, "They're both in their own world, and they don't come out from that world". According to Ōyama, Shū is "a 2011 version of Shinji", although Shinji has a more passive and pessimistic attitude. Similarly, Asa Butterfield compared Shinji to Ender Wiggin, whom he portrayed in Ender's Game. According to Butterfield, both characters "withdraw from the world", are confronted with unfamiliar experiences, and fight unknown enemies. Shinji's Japanese voice actress, Megumi Ogata, likened Makoto Naegi from the Danganronpa franchise, whom she also voiced, to Shinji because both are ordinary boys placed in "terrible situations".

Anime critics have also compared several characters to Shinji, including Lain Iwakura from Serial Experiments Lain, Simon from Gurren Lagann, Daisuke Dojima from Revisions, Kōji Aiba from Infinite Ryvius, Cloud Strife from Final Fantasy VII, and the protagonist of Cyborg She. In the fourth episode of the television drama Nigeru wa Haji da ga Yaku ni Tatsu, a character appears who was named Shinji after him. Shinji is also referenced in Steven Universe, which parodies the final scene of Neon Genesis Evangelion. The British band Fightstar included a track titled "Shinji Ikari" on the deluxe-edition bonus disc of their album One Day Son, This Will All Be Yours. Open Mike Eagle titled a track on his album Anime, Trauma and Divorce "Headass (Idiot Shinji)". Kong: Skull Island director Jordan Vogt-Roberts also named a character Gunpei Ikari.

== Bibliography ==
- Afanasov, Nikolai (2020). "The Depressed Messiah: Religion, Science Fiction, and Postmodernism in Neon Genesis Evangelion". State, Religion and Church. 7 (1).
- Haslem, Wendy; Ndalianis, Angela; Mackie, Christopher J. (2007). Super/heroes : from Hercules to Superman. Washington, DC: New Academia Pub. ISBN 978-0-9777908-4-5. OCLC 123026083.
- Iso, Mitsuo (2023). 磯光雄 ANIMATION WORKS preproduction [Iso Mitsuo ANIMATION WORKS preproduction] (in Japanese) (1st ed.). Tokyo, Japan: Style. ISBN 978-4-80-213353-1.
- Lamerichs, Nicolle (2022). "The Emotional Realism of Anime: Rewriting Characters and Affective Reception in Evangelion 3.0+1.0: Thrice Upon a Time". Mechademia. 15 (1). Minneapolis: University of Minnesota Press: 81–102. eISSN 2152-6648. ISSN 1934-2489. JSTOR 48853842. LCCN 2006215646. OCLC 1376034838. S2CID 254824343. Gale A732431709.
- Marine, Alexandre (2021). Neon Genesis Evangelion: Le renouveau de l'animation japonaise (in French). Pix'n love Editions. ISBN 978-2-37188-093-1.
- Murakami, Takashi (2005). Little Boy: The Arts Of Japan's Exploding Subculture. Yale University Press. ISBN 978-0-300-10285-7.
- Napier, Susan J. (November 2002). "When the Machines Stop: Fantasy, Reality, and Terminal Identity in Neon Genesis Evangelion and Serial Experiments Lain". Science Fiction Studies. 29 (88). ISSN 0091-7729.
- Poggio, Alessandra (2008). Neon Genesis Evangelion Encyclopedia (in Italian). Dynit.
- Sanenari, Oizumi (1997). Anno Hideaki Sukidzo Evangerion (in Japanese). Ōta Shuppan. ISBN 4-87233-315-2.
- Stojnic, Betty (2021). "Boy With Machine: A Deleuzo-Guattarian Critique of Neon Genesis Evangelion". Journal of Anime and Manga Studies. 2. Archived from the original on April 22, 2026.
- Takekuma, Kentaro (1997). Anno Hideaki Parano Evangerion (in Japanese). Ōta Shuppan. ISBN 4-87233-316-0.
- Tsang, Gabriel F. Y. (2016). "Beyond 2015: Nihilism and Existentialist Rhetoric in Neon Genesis Evangelion". Journal of International and Advanced Japanese Studies. 8. University of Tsukuba.
- Tsukamoto, Satoshi (2022). "The Enigmatic Power of Neon Genesis Evangelion" (PDF). 文明. 21 (42). Aichi University. Archived (PDF) from the original on November 17, 2023.
