= Rei Ayanami =

Character from Neon Genesis Evangelion

- Neon Genesis Evangelion character
- Rei with her Evangelion Unit-00 (in the background) as a child (left), as a pilot (center), and as a student (right)
- First appearance: Neon Genesis Evangelion chapter 2: "Reunion" (1995)
- Created by: Gainax
- Voiced by: Japanese; Megumi Hayashibara; English: Amanda Winn-Lee (ADV dub and Rebuild series; Prime Video dub); Brina Palencia (Rebuild series; Funimation dub); Ryan Bartley (Netflix dub)

In-universe information
- Species: Human clone
- Gender: Female
- Title: First Child
- Notable relatives: Gendo Ikari; Yui Ikari (biological source); Lilith (biological source); Shinji Ikari (son of Yui)

Rei Ayanami (Note: Japanese: 綾波 レイ, Hepburn: Ayanami Rei; IPA: [ajaꜜnamʲi ɾeː]) is a character from the Neon Genesis Evangelion anime series and its eponymous franchise, created by the anime studio Gainax. Rei is an introverted girl who pilots Evangelion Unit-00, one of the giant mecha known as Evangelions, and bears the designation First Child. At the beginning of the series, Rei is a mysterious figure whose unusual behavior puzzles her peers. As the series progresses, she becomes more involved with those around her, particularly her classmate and fellow Evangelion pilot, Shinji Ikari. The series eventually reveals that she is a clone of Shinji's mother, Yui Ikari, and Lilith, an entity known as an Angel. Rei appears in the franchise's animated feature films and related media, including video games, the original net animation Petit Eva: Evangelion@School, the Rebuild of Evangelion films, and Yoshiyuki Sadamoto's manga adaptation.

Hideaki Anno, director of the animated series, conceived Rei as a representation of his unconscious mind. His readings in psychology, particularly Freudian psychoanalysis and the theory of the Oedipus complex, influenced his conception of the character. Character designer Yoshiyuki Sadamoto drew inspiration from Paul Gallico's The Snow Goose; Rei's blue hair reuses a design element from the protagonist of Gainax's unproduced animated film Aoki Uru. Megumi Hayashibara voices Rei in Japanese, and Amanda Winn-Lee, Brina Palencia, and Ryan Bartley voice her in English.

Rei has received generally positive responses from viewers and critics. The character became popular within the otaku community and inspired homages among Neon Genesis Evangelion fans. Reviewers have praised Rei's mysterious aura, her role in the story, and her character development; other critics have described her as lacking personality and being trite. Rei has inspired a range of merchandise, including figures and accessories, and has been featured in promotional collaborations between Evangelion and organizations such as the Aonami Line and the Japan National Tourism Organization. Her popularity influenced the music and fashion industries. Critics have attributed her success to a combination of moe, or affectionate, traits that appealed to anime fans and influenced subsequent female anime characters.

== Creation and conception ==
=== Original concept and influences ===
Hideaki Anno, director of the anime Neon Genesis Evangelion, chose Ayanami's surname after the Japanese destroyer Ayanami, following the naval naming pattern used for other characters in the series. He took her first name from a character in the anime and manga series Sailor Moon, Rei Hino, also known as Sailor Mars. In Japanese, Rei can mean "zero". (Note: This reading applies to the kanji Rei (零).) According to Patrick Drazen, a lecturer of Japanese popular culture, the name may be a pun on her role as the pilot of Evangelion Unit-00. Critic Hiroki Azuma suggested that the name may instead derive from Zero, the protagonist of Ryū Murakami's 1987 novel Ai to Gensō no Fascism.

Anno asked Yoshiyuki Sadamoto to design Rei as a depressed and reticent girl. The song "Doko e demo ikeru kitte" (Note: 何処へでも行ける切手) by the band Kinniku Shōjo Tai inspired Sadamoto, particularly the line "hotai de masshiro na shojo", (Note: 包帯で真っ白な少女; lit. 'the girl white with bandages') which prompted him to draw Rei. The band also released a song named "Fumimi no kodomo", (Note: 福耳の子供) which features a softly spoken, almost mumbled female monologue; Sadamoto imagined Rei with a similar voice. Ukina, a character from Sadamoto's previous work Koto, served as Rei's model, and Sadamoto gave Rei a messy, layered bob haircut. Sadamoto also drew inspiration from The Snow Goose, a novella by Paul Gallico that describes a painting of its protagonist as a thin, pale girl in an empty room.

Anno wanted a melancholic adolescent character, so Sadamoto originally designed Rei with dark eyes and hair. To distinguish her from the other female protagonist, Asuka Langley Soryu, he gave Rei contrasting eye and hair colors. Sadamoto conceived Asuka as occupying the position of an idol in the world of Neon Genesis Evangelion and as representing heterosexual desire; conversely, he conceived Rei as a symbol of motherhood. Anno suggested giving Rei red eyes, which he believed would strengthen her personality and distinguish her from the other characters. Sadamoto changed her hair color to blue, echoing the protagonist of Aoki Uru, the unmade film sequel to Royal Space Force: The Wings of Honnêamise (1987). He also gave her black socks in response to loose socks being fashionable at the time he created Rei, and black ran counter to fashion at that time.

=== Development ===
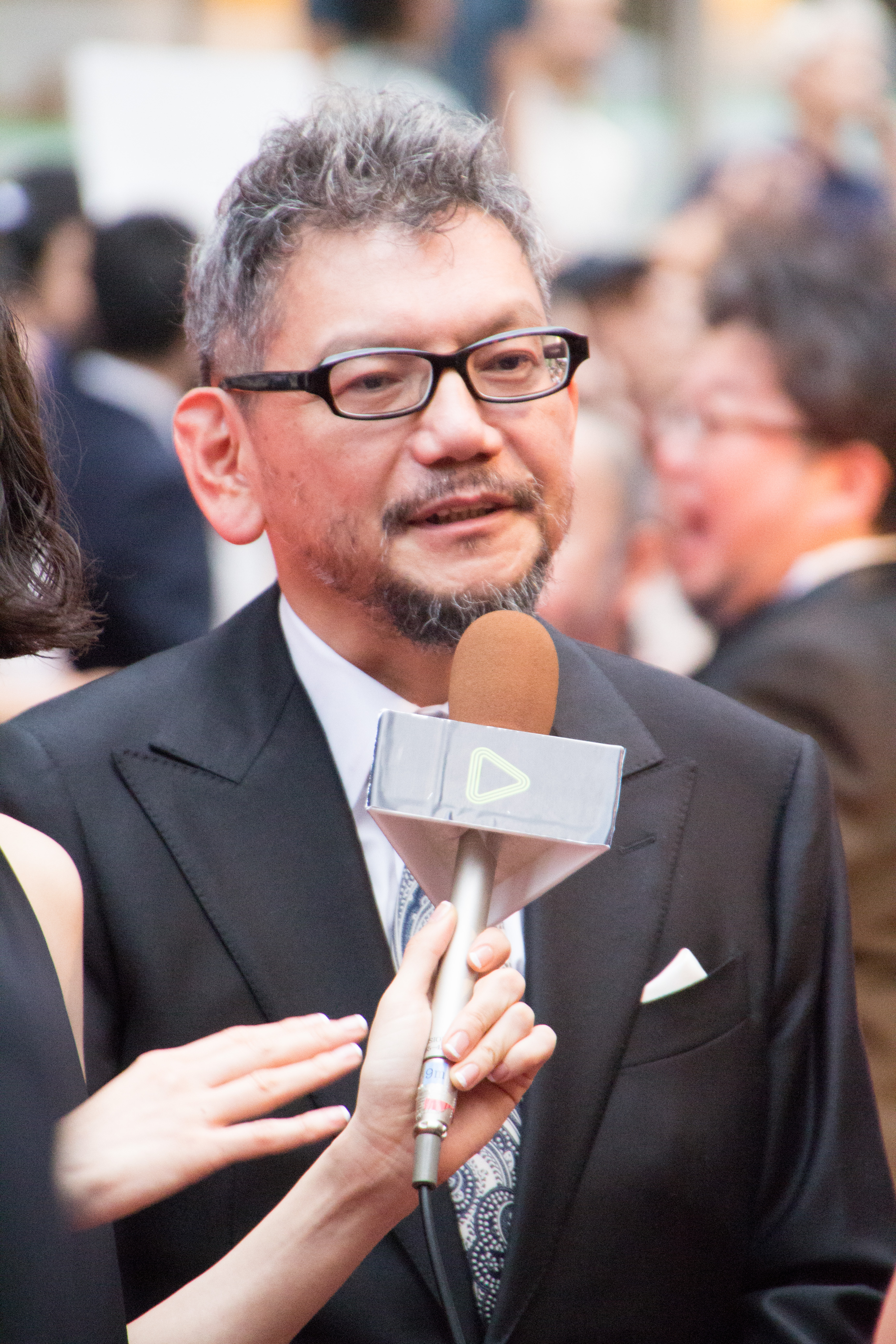
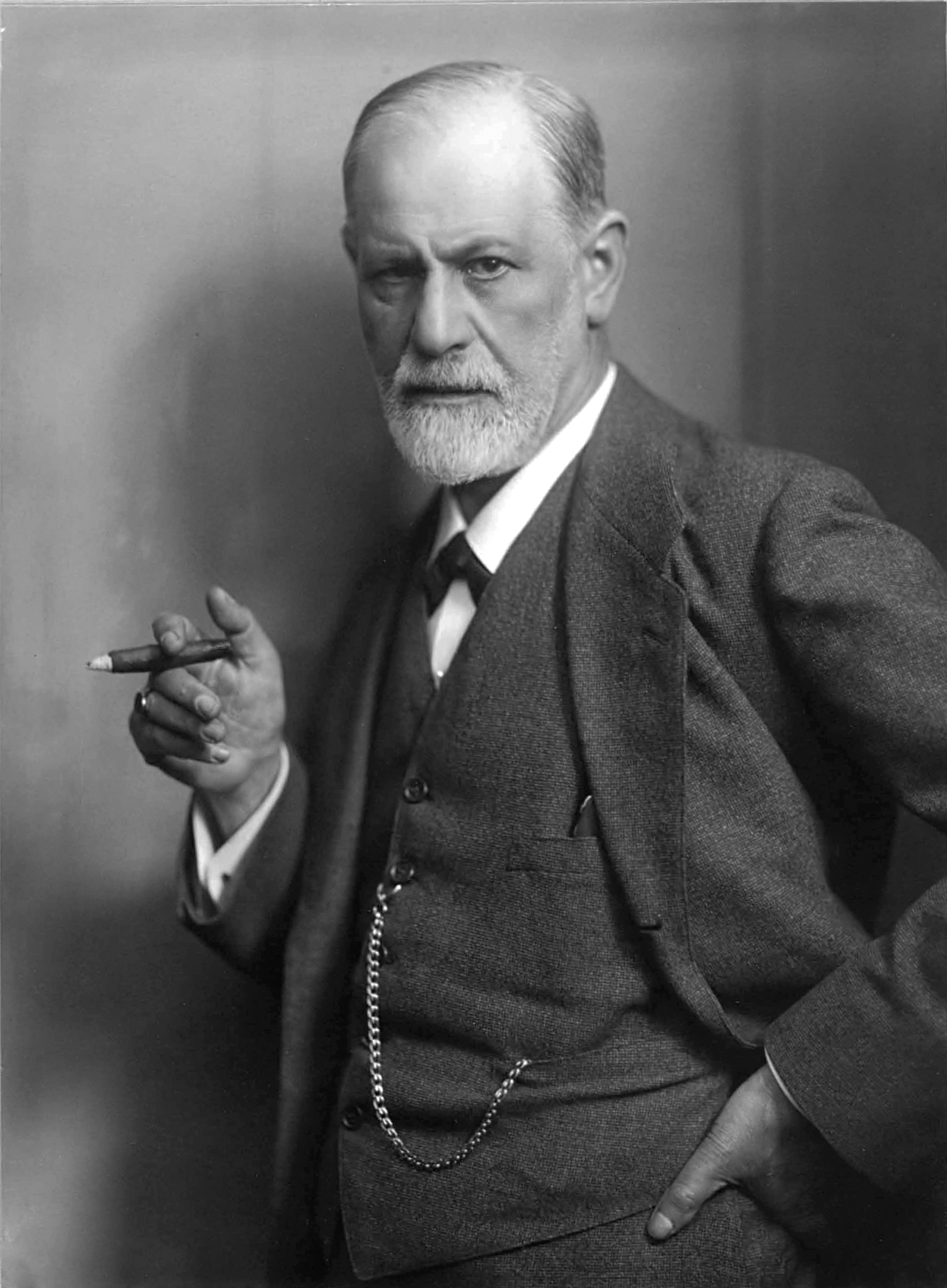
Hideaki Anno (left) incorporated concepts from Sigmund Freud (right) when he developed Rei.

Anno drew on Sigmund Freud's psychoanalytic concept of the Oedipus complex when developing Rei's role. He conceived the Evangelion and Rei as surrogate maternal figures for Shinji Ikari; Rei's emotional closeness to Shinji's father, Gendo Ikari, added another layer to this Oedipal structure. Sadamoto developed the erotic dimension of this dynamic in a more enigmatic and subdued form, contrasting with Anno's preference for more direct sexual expression. Animator Mitsuo Iso proposed further ideas for the character. In his plans, Rei had a connection to Arqa, (Note: アルカ, Aruka) an ancient ruin located deep beneath special agency Nerv's headquarters that served as her metaphorical mother. Iso envisioned Rei dying upon experiencing her first menstruation. Iso associated her with a substance called Adamah, (Note: アダマ, Adama; lit. 'dirt') described as soil that is partially living, and proposed that only Gendo could touch her. He gave Rei the baptismal name Karuya. (Note: カルヤ, Karuya) Other proposals connected her existence to Gendo's attempts to recreate Shinji's mother, Yui Ikari, and to a covenant with twelve final Angels, the name of the extraterrestrials in Neon Genesis Evangelion. Iso envisioned with a mood reminiscent of Osamu Tezuka's Dororo and said only Gendo knows Rei could be killed with Arqa.

During Evangelion's production and first broadcast, Anno struggled to write the character because he lacked personal interest in her and found her difficult to understand or relate to. He nevertheless regarded Rei as a representation of his unconscious mind, and originally conceived her as "the unconscious Shinji". (Note: Hideaki Anno described Rei in the original Japanese as, "無意識のシンジ君ってのは綾波レイ" ["The unconscious Shinji is Rei Ayanami"].) Even in the fifth and sixth episodes, "Rei I" and "Rei II", which center on her character, Rei speaks only sparingly. Anno's lack of affinity with Rei led him to forget about her personality for much of the series and give her limited narrative space. Rei appears in only one scene in the seventh episode, "A Human Work", after Anno remembered to add her. Conversely, she never appears in the eighth installment, "Asuka Strikes!" As with other Evangelion characters, he incorporated aspects of his own life into Rei, including his vegetarianism and avoidance of meat. Early in production, Anno said that uncertainty about his company's future left him unsure what would happen to Rei and the other characters. The character's backstory also changed during development. According to Sadamoto and assistant director Kazuya Tsurumaki, the staff originally conceived her as an alien entity before making her at least genetically human. In an interview, the two described Rei as possessing Yui's human genes, and those of the first Angel, Adam [sic]; Tsurumaki compared her condition to that of a Devilman, the human-demon hybrid from Go Nagai's manga Devilman.

During production of the fourteenth episode, "Weaving a Story", Anno decided to explore Rei and her emotions through a monologue. When he was writing it, he sought to take her character in a schizophrenic direction and considered how to portray madness. He was lent an issue of the mook Bessatsu Takarajima (Note: 別冊宝島) about mental illness that included a poem by a person with a mental disorder; the poem stimulated his imagination and helped him write the monologue. In the original script for the twenty-first episode, Naoko Akagi, the creator of a supercomputer in the series and the mother of scientist Ritsuko Akagi, strangles the first Rei clone, but that clone survives; after briefly losing consciousness, Rei awakens alone in an empty command room. Instead, the released episode shows Naoko killing this Rei and then herself. In "Rei III", one of the series' final episodes, the second Rei dies and a new clone replaces her, behaving like a stranger toward Shinji. Anno planned the second clone's death from the beginning. Anno considered Rei's character arc essentially complete after her smile in the sixth episode because she and Shinji had connected with each other in that scene. He compared Rei's development after the scene in which she smiles at Shinji, followed by a regression in interpersonal communication, to that of Hideki Gō from Return of Ultraman; Gō grows closer to the other members of the Monster Attack Team, only to become estranged from them soon afterward. Anno attributed this pattern to his own mistrust and fear of communicating with others. (Note: Hideaki Anno: "僕の他人に対するコミュニケーションの不信感とか、恐怖っていうのが出ていますね、その辺は。" ["For instance, in my distrust of communications with other people, a feeling of fear comes out of that sort."])

=== Voice actresses ===
Megumi Hayashibara voiced Rei in the original series and all of the character's subsequent appearances, including the later films, spin-offs, video games, and the Rebuild of Evangelion film series. In 1995, Hayashibara said Rei's laconic personality intrigued her and presented a new challenge. Hayashibara also auditioned for Asuka and Misato Katsuragi, the latter being a commander and guardian of Shinji. Anno cast her as Rei after hearing her performance in the original video animation Ichigatsu ni wa Christmas, (Note: 1月にはChristmas) believing her voice better suited the character. Hayashibara recalled that few taciturn, emotionally cold characters existed in anime before Neon Genesis Evangelion; lacking models to imitate, she developed her own approach to Rei. During the recording sessions, Hideaki Anno guided Hayashibara and instructed her to deliver her lines in the flattest tone possible. She recalled his explanation: "It's not that she doesn't have emotion, but that she doesn't know what it is". According to Hayashibara, Rei's inability to understand emotion leaves no distinction between her words and feelings. She also attributed Rei's appeal to her lack of calculated pretense, arguing that her beauty stems from the fact that "she has feelings", and said that discovering the warmth hidden beneath Rei's detached exterior allowed her to relate to the character.

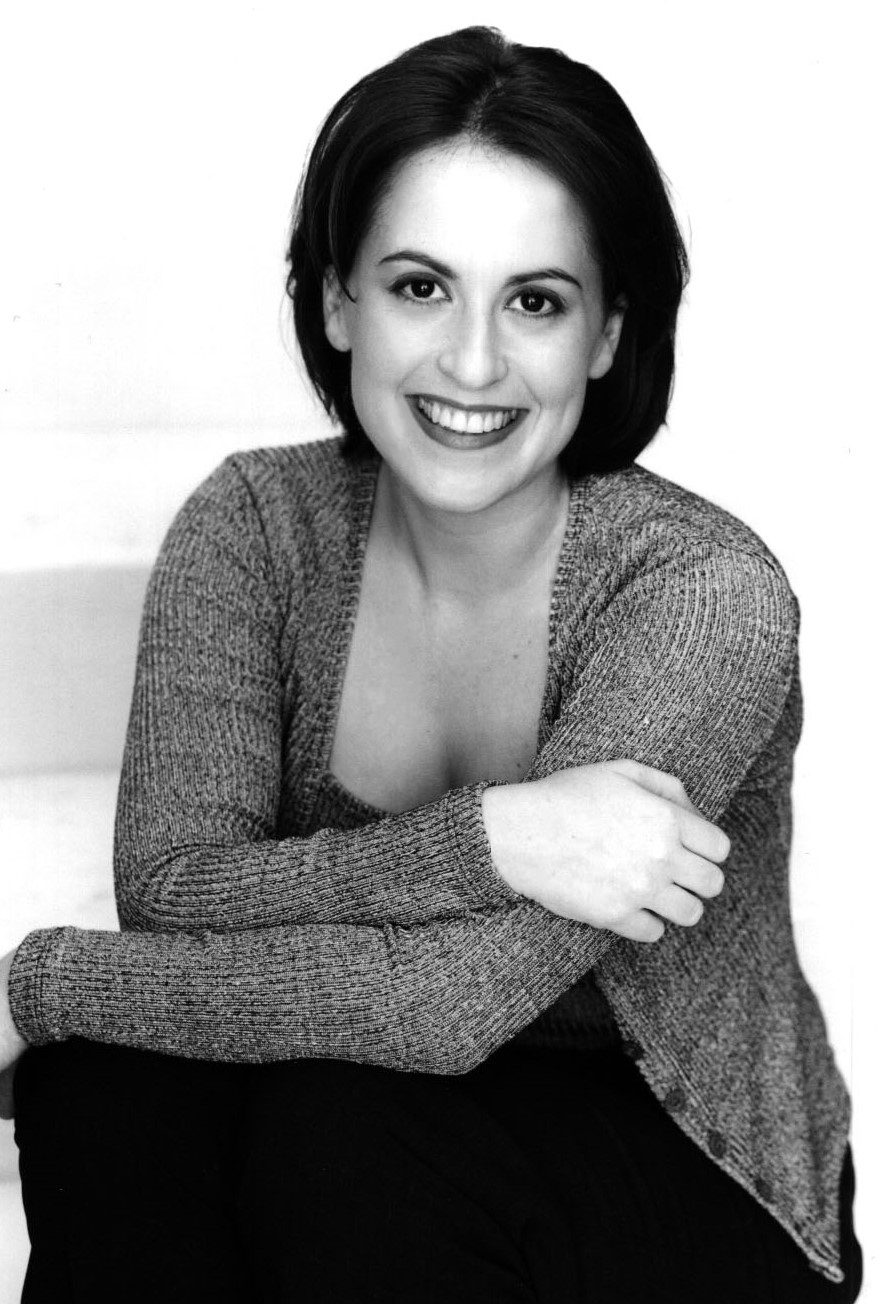
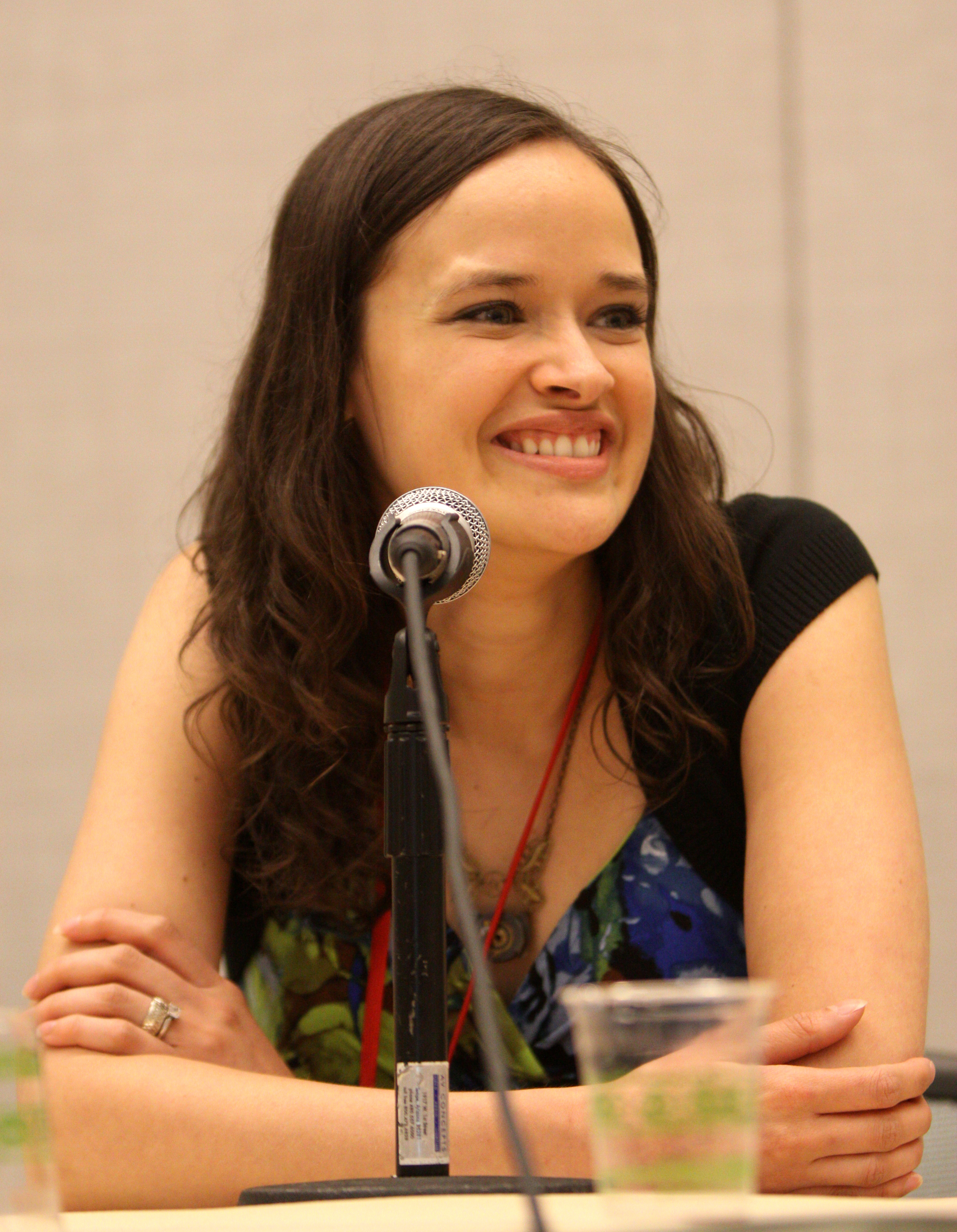
Amanda Winn-Lee (left) voiced Rei Ayanami in the ADV dub of the original series, the Manga dub of The End of Evangelion, and the Amazon dub of Rebuild. Brina Palencia (right) voiced her in the Funimation dub of Rebuild of Evangelion.

When Hayashibara was voicing for a mahjong game featuring Gainax characters, she said she came to understand the difference between "lack of intonation" and "absence of emotion" in speech. She interpreted a lack of intonation as a sign of "self-confidence"; in her view, insecure or insincere people tend to emphasize their words, whereas Rei speaks plainly because she is honest and truthful. (Note: Megumi Hayashibara: "最近わかったことなんですけど、言葉に抑揚がないっていうのは、感情がないっていうのではなくて、ひとつの自信の現れでもあるのかなって思うようになったんですよ。" ["Lately, I understood it, but as for the lack of intonation in the words, and the absence of emotion, I thought like there was an expression of self-confidence."]) Hayashibara reprised the role for the Rebuild series. During production of the third film, Evangelion: 3.0 You Can (Not) Redo (2012), she recorded scenes before the animation was complete and therefore asked Anno to explain the action to her. She had to voice Rei as indifferent and take care to convey her feelings of happiness with the right nuance.

Regarding the final installment, Evangelion: 3.0+1.0 Thrice Upon a Time (2021), Hayashibara found it difficult to portray another Rei clone as she gradually matures; the staff criticized her both when she tried to make Rei sound pure and when she gave her a less emotional performance. Anno wanted the characters to sound younger and express fuller emotions, making it difficult for Hayashibara to capture the nuances he sought. Shunsuke Nozawa, an anthropologist, noted an explosion of interest in Japanese voice actors during the 1990s and placed Hayashibara at the center of this shift, attributing it to the "enormous, societal-level fascination" with Ayanami. As a result, Hayashibara received interviews about the series and regular invitations to appear on television as a celebrity.

Amanda Winn-Lee voices Rei in English in the original series and the Amazon dubs of the Rebuild of Evangelion films. According to Winn-Lee, Rei retains a sense of humanity beneath her cold, detached exterior despite her low self-esteem and awareness that others consider her expendable. Brina Palencia voices Rei in Funimation's dub of the Rebuild of Evangelion films, and Ryan Bartley voices her in the Netflix dub.

== Appearances ==
=== Neon Genesis Evangelion ===
The series introduces Rei Ayanami as an enigmatic girl who pilots an Evangelion, a giant biomechanical humanoid deployed by special agency Nerv against Angels. Rei attends school with Shinji Ikari, the series's protagonist and a fellow Evangelion pilot, and is later revealed to be a clone of his mother, Yui Ikari. She is considered the First Child, or First Children in the Japanese version. In 2014, she enrolls at Tokyo-3's First Municipal Middle School. The next year, the Angels begin attacking the city, prompting Nerv's Commander Gendo Ikari to summon his son, Shinji, to pilot an Eva unit. When Shinji refuses to pilot, Rei first appears severely injured from an accident. (Note: According to Satoshi Tsukamoto and Andrew M. Winters, Rei Ayanami got injured from a previous fight.) Seeing Rei's condition and feeling sympathy for her, Shinji ultimately agrees to pilot the Evangelion in her place. In the episode "Don't Be", the Angel Arael subjects Rei's fellow pilot Asuka Langley Soryu to a psychic attack that forces her to relive her painful past. Gendo then orders Rei to retrieve a weapon named Lance of Longinus from underground and use it against the Angel. Rei retrieves the lance and hurls it at her target, piercing and defeating Arael. As the series progresses, Rei pilots her assigned Evangelion unit under Gendo's command and develops a caring relationship with Shinji.

In the twenty-third episode, "Rei III", Rei decides to sacrifice herself alongside Evangelion Unit-00 in the battle with the Angel Armisael to save Shinji and destroy the enemy. After her apparent death, Ritsuko Akagi reveals that Rei was born at the Laboratory for Artificial Evolution's third branch, located beneath Lake Ashino in Hakone. Rei's blue-haired body derives from Yui Ikari, who died during an experiment with Evangelion Unit-01. Ritsuko also reveals that Nerv keeps numerous Rei clones in the deepest level of its headquarters, allowing another clone to replace each Rei after her death. Rei also incorporates the soul of Lilith, (Note: According to Alba Torrents González and Andreu Ballús Santacana, Rei is Lilith in human form, and Lilith is the progenitor of humans in the series.) the second Angel. Nerv stores her memories in a spinal columnar object inside the Dummy Plug Plant in Central Dogma. A flashback in the twenty-first episode, "He was aware that he was still a child", reveals that in 2010, Gendo brought the first Rei clone, Rei I, to the Gehirn base, the predecessor of Nerv that developed and constructed the first Evangelion units, introducing her as the daughter an acquaintance had entrusted to him. Naoko Akagi, a romantic rival to Yui, killed this first Rei. During her visit to Gehirn, Rei I became lost in the laboratory's control room and encountered Naoko, whom she called an "old hag" as if to provoke her. She then revealed that Gendo used the same insult for Naoko. Recognizing Yui's features in the girl's face, Naoko flew into a rage and strangled Rei I before taking her own life.

After her sacrifice, a third and final clone replaces Rei II. Ritsuko later destroys all of Rei's other bodies. Although this Rei clone shows greater emotional detachment, her bond with Shinji ultimately leads her to defy Gendo. In the opening scenes of the film The End of Evangelion (1997), Rei III sees the disintegrated bodies of the other Ayanami clones floating in a tank. She later triggers the apocalyptic Third Impact and merges with Lilith, allowing Shinji to determine the course of Human Instrumentality, a process that merges humanity into a single collective consciousness. During Instrumentality, Rei assumes a gigantic form, gathers humanity's souls, and grows a third eye. Shinji rejects Instrumentality, causing Rei's giant form to decompose. Afterward, as Shinji rematerializes, he briefly sees Rei watching him from a distance before she disappears.

=== Rebuild of Evangelion ===
Rei returns as a central character in Rebuild of Evangelion, appearing in the series's first installment, Evangelion: 1.0 You Are (Not) Alone (2007). She pilots Evangelion Unit-00 and helps Shinji defeat the Angel Ramiel. The Rebuild series shows Shinji and Rei's relationship as central to the story and expands their interactions compared with the original series. In the second film, Evangelion: 2.0 You Can (Not) Advance (2009), Rei develops a closer and more explicit relationship with Shinji than in the original series. In a departure from her original characterization, she attempts to host a dinner party for her fellow pilots. Anno originally considered this idea for the fourth episode of the original anime, "Hedgehog's Dilemma", but abandoned it during production. At the climax, the Angel Zeruel devours Rei and Unit-00. After Unit-01 goes out of control, Shinji enters the Angel and pulls Rei free, and the two embrace; the battle ends with both trapped inside Unit-01 and their actions triggering the Third Impact. Fuyutsuki remarks that Shinji's behavior has improved; Gendo states that his plan requires Shinji and Rei to come together. After the film's release, Tsurumaki addressed the apparent plan to bring Shinji and Rei together, attributing that impression to the complexities of the script and expressing doubt that Anno had developed such a strategy in detail.

In the third installment, Evangelion: 3.0 You Can (Not) Redo (2012), set fourteen years later, another Rei clone takes the place of her predecessor and displays a colder, more taciturn personality. In Evangelion: 3.0+1.0 Thrice Upon a Time (2021), the series' final film, the new clone, named Ayanami (Tentative Name), travels with Shinji and Asuka Shikinami to Village 3, a settlement whose inhabitants survived the Impacts and live isolated from the largely uninhabitable outside world. Here, Rei interacts with Toji Suzuhara and Hikari Horaki, her former classmates who now live in the village as adults, as well as the village's women and children, and helps them work in the fields. Through these experiences, she develops a sense of individuality, discovers everyday life, and learns to socialize with the villagers. Eventually, Rei (Tentative Name), whose designation is Ayanami-Type No.006, loses the ability to maintain her form because she requires continuous exposure to the Evangelion's LCL liquid, and she dies in front of Shinji. During Instrumentality, Shinji reunites with the Rei from fourteen years earlier, who has remained inside Evangelion Unit-01. Now sporting visibly longer hair, Rei speaks with Shinji, who chooses to create a world free of Evangelions and give it a new beginning, Neon Genesis. The two bid each other a final farewell, shaking hands and smiling.

Critics have identified posthumanist themes in the Rebuild of Evangelion films and Rei's new characterization. According to humanities scholar Quanyu Liao, Rei symbolizes "technological replication" and, as a clone, can survive in inhospitable and polluted areas. Liao also argued that Gendo and Seele's exploitation of Rei's clones epitomizes transhumanism and capitalism. Erick Agung Yohanes, Nita Novianti, and Nia Nafisah, professors of the English language, noted that Rei's clones show no emotion on their faces, emphasizing their artificial nature. Critic Daichi Nakagawa regarded Rei as an example of how artificial life can typify development better than human life, and professors Antonin Bechler and Kenjirō Muramatsu described Rei as portrayed in Evangelion 3.0+1.0 as the "quintessential simulacrum" who attempts to connect with other humans. (Note: The journal article states, "C'est ainsi qu'à travers le contact avec la réalité physique (travail manuel aux champs, bains, repas) et avec autrui, le personnage de Rei, simulacre par excellence, réapprend l'humanité." ["It is thus through the contact with the physical reality (through manually in fields, baths, and meals) and with others, the person of Rei, the quintessential simulacrum, relearns the humanity."])

=== Other appearances ===
In Yoshiyuki Sadamoto's manga adaptation of the television series, Rei first appears in the first volume's (Note: The first volume of the manga is titled "Angel Attack" (使徒、襲来, Shito, Shūrai) in Japanese, sharing the name with the first episode of the anime, "Angel Attack".) second chapter, "Reunion". (Note: 再会, Saikai) She initially regards herself as empty and useless, believing that she exists solely to pilot the Evangelion under Gendo's orders, but physical contact with Shinji begins to change her outlook. In a scene in the manga's fifth volume, Rei burns herself when she prepares tea with Shinji at her apartment, and their hands briefly touch. Rei uses the occasion to encourage Shinji to talk to his father and open up to him. In a later chapter, she recalls the moment and wonders whether she will ever touch Shinji's hands again. During her battle with the Angel Armisael, Rei becomes increasingly aware of her sadness and affection for Shinji. Sadamoto's manga alters Rei's characterization, making her more empathetic and receptive to human contact than her animated counterpart, and provides a larger role to Rei than to Asuka. Sadamoto placed particular emphasis on Rei's relationship with Shinji, using the depictions of hands touching and the theme of motherhood. Sadamoto got the idea to show the close relationship between a son and his mother from The Drifting Classroom, a manga by Kazuo Umezu. Sadamoto described Shinji and Rei's feelings for each other as mutual love.

The animated series' final episode presents an alternate reality that departs from the preceding storyline. In this scenario, Rei joins Asuka and Shinji's class as a new student and displays a cheerful, absent-minded, and irascible personality. Spin-offs such as Neon Genesis Evangelion: Angelic Days, which takes place in the same alternate reality, retain this more outgoing characterization. The original net animation Petit Eva: Evangelion@School, a parody of the original series, features three Ayanami sisters: one has a diligent and introverted personality, another displays an outgoing and athletic personality, and the third is a four-year-old who collects stuffed toys. Neon Genesis Evangelion: Anima, set three years after The End of Evangelion in an alternate timeline, introduces multiple incarnations of Rei: Rei Troi, who pilots an Evangelion named Evangelion Unit-02 Type II Allegorica; Rei Quatre; Rei Cinq; and the seven-year-old Rei Six. Each pilots an Evangelion-0.0 unit. In Neon Genesis Evangelion: Campus Apocalypse, Rei's relationship with the Angel Kaworu Nagisa attracts Shinji's attention. She also appears in Neon Genesis Evangelion: Legend of the Piko Piko Middle School Students.

Rei appears in media outside the Evangelion franchise. She appears as a playable character in Super Robot Wars, MapleStory, and Sonic Racing: CrossWorlds. Tales of Zestiria and The First Descendant also offer her as downloadable content. She is featured in an official Shinkansen Henkei Robo Shinkalion crossover episode. The simulation game Neon Genesis Evangelion: Ayanami Raising Project places the player in charge of caring for Rei. Rei also appears in Neon Genesis Evangelion: Girlfriend of Steel 2nd and Neon Genesis Evangelion 2. In the manga adaptation of Neon Genesis Evangelion: Shinji Ikari Raising Project, Rei transfers to Shinji's school and complicates his relationship with Asuka. Neon Genesis Evangelion RPG, a tabletop role-playing game adaptation of Neon Genesis Evangelion, includes Rei as a playable character.

== Characterization and themes ==
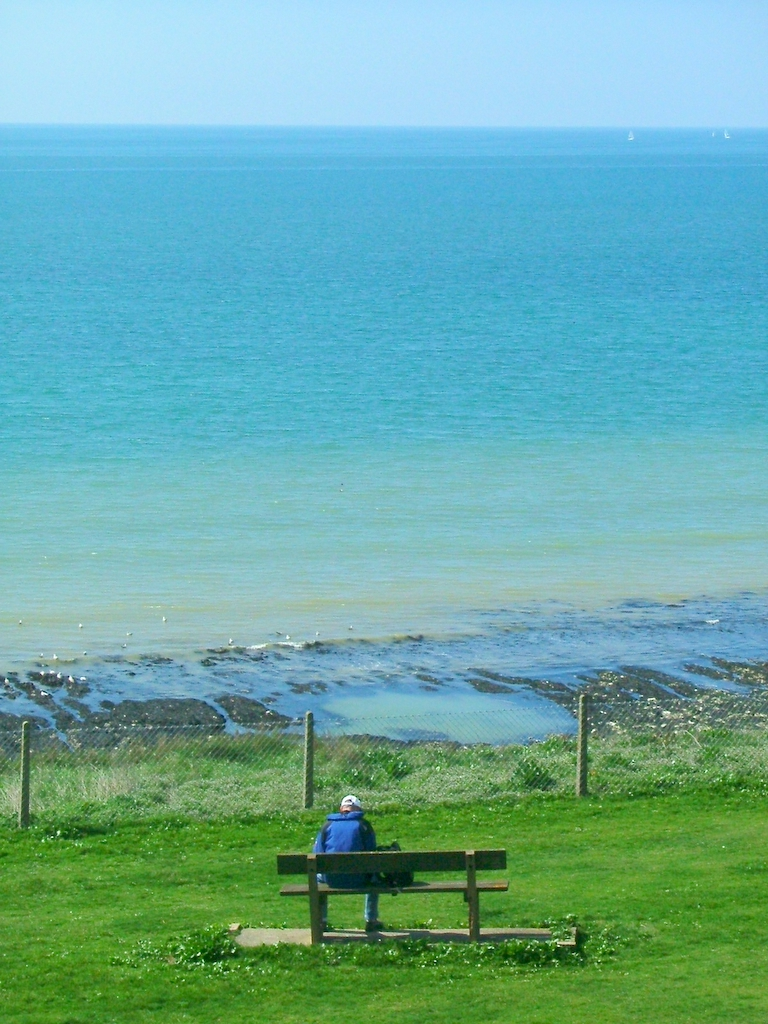
Rei is characterized as solitary and socially detached character. Anno said that she feels she does not need friends.

Rei is an enigmatic, unhappy, and taciturn girl with few social connections who readily follows orders. She is introverted, uncomplaining, socially detached, and aloof. Hideaki Anno described Rei as a very quiet, taciturn girl who rarely complains and said that she was created solely to pilot an Evangelion. Sociologist Satomi Ishikawa analyzed a scene in the series' sixth episode, "Rei II", in which Shinji asks Rei why she pilots Evangelion Unit-00. Rei answers that piloting provides her only connection with other people, expressing her total commitment to fighting the Angels, even at the cost of her life. Rei also says she wants to die and disappear from existence. Japanese critic Tamaki Saitō argued that Rei's existence has no solid basis, "she knows no trauma, and she lacks motivation". During a show, a boy asked Anno what Rei likes, and Anno replied that he had never thought about it. According to him, she does not appreciate her own life, hurts herself, and feels she does not need friends, being aware of her replaceability: "Her presence, her existence—ostensible existence—is ephemeral. She's a very sad girl. She only has the barest minimum of what she needs to have." Anno also attributed the Japanese attraction to characters such as Rei to "a stunted imaginative landscape born of Japan's defeat in the Second World War" and remarked on the lack of preparation for adulthood in Japanese education after the Second World War.

For critic Gerald Alva Miller, Rei experiences alienation and existential angst beneath her cold demeanor. Critics have linked her silent and inexpressive personality to alexithymia or a schizoid personality disorder. Gainax compared her to a blank noh mask. Anno characterized her as "a brain that does not see dreams, completely separated from Jung's collective unconscious". (Note: Hideaki Anno: "綾波レイとは何か? それは、ユングの集合的無意識から完全に見離された、夢を見ない脳。" ["What is Rei Ayanami? As for that, a brain that does not see dreams, completely separated from Jung's collective unconscious."]) Gualtiero Cannarsi, who wrote the dialogue for the Italian adaptation of the series, similarly described Rei as lacking basic life skills because no one taught them to her, leaving her uninterested in such matters. This attitude manifests in the neglected hygiene in her apartment. In one episode, Ritsuko Akagi remarks that Rei, like Commander Ikari, lacks practical life skills. Its floor is littered with scientific texts on biological interactions and genetics written in the Latin alphabet in the original series and The Happy Prince and Other Tales in the Rebuild of Evangelion series. Hiroki Azuma argued that Anno combined images of refugees and trauma, which he associated with postwar crises such as the conflict in Bosnia, with the scientific, starkly undecorated appearance of Rei's room. Neon Genesis Evangelion character designer Yoshiyuki Sadamoto compared her disposition to a shadow and air, describing her as someone people desire but cannot attain. According to Sadamoto, Rei experiences emotions but struggles to express them or communicate with others. He also described Rei and Asuka as characters with different strengths. Hayashibara viewed Rei as celestial and said her fluctuating emotions required meticulous attention during her performance to avoid repeating takes. Professor Hoon J. Lee also observed that Rei rescues Asuka when she becomes overwhelmed by her suffering and loses the will to act.

From the series's opening episodes, Rei struggles to interpret Shinji's words and actions in his attempts to connect with her. Although the two pilots occasionally converse, they fail to communicate on an emotional level or understand each other's feelings. After a major battle in the sixth episode, Shinji cries with relief at finding Rei alive, prompting her to smile, a major turning point in her character development. Their exchange brings them to a point of mutual understanding. Emily Muir described her relationship with Shinji in the early episodes as protective. Later in the series, Rei begins to question her previous loyalty to Gendo, ultimately rebelling against him and rescuing Shinji by detonating her own Evangelion unit. Muir interpreted this development as the emergence of "human will". In the twenty-third episode, she decides to save Shinji from an Angel attack; Lecturer Mio Bryce, researcher Paul Cheung, and doctorate student Anna Katrina Gutierrez interpreted the scene as a demonstration of her humanity. Frenchy Lunning, a professor, described Rei as an anima of the male protagonist. Through her relationship with Shinji, Rei becomes increasingly aware of her own identity and desires. Critics have linked their relationship to Rei's background as a genetic clone of Shinji's mother, suggesting that their bond stems from and is strengthened by Rei's maternal nature. Professors Artur Lozano-Méndez and Antonio Loriguillo-López said that the facts she was made in Shinji's mother's likeness and Gendo loved Rei more than Shinji complicate her relationship with Shinji. Kazuya Tsurumaki described Shinji's feelings for Rei as sexual and incestuous; conversely, Kentaro Takekuma, editor of the book Parano / Neon Genesis Evangelion, called her an "eternal virgin". (Note: Kentaro Takekuma: "永遠の処女というかね。" ["Or rather, she is an eternal virgin, right?"]) According to screenwriter Yōji Enokido, she produces in young men a feeling of distance as though they still depend on their mothers. In the first episode, Shinji also sees a ghost of Rei in a deserted city near Tokyo-3. This apparition differs from the physical Rei and has been linked to the scenario of the film The End of Evangelion, released in 1997 as a conclusion to the classic series, in which people undergoing Instrumentality see apparitions of Rei shortly before they die. Yūichirō Oguro, an editor of the Japanese home video editions of Evangelion, wrote that the ghost of Rei that Shinji sees on the avenue symbolizes his mother's protection throughout the series.

=== Comparisons and symbolism ===
Rei Ayanami was compared to the Shinto goddess Amaterasu (left) and the Christian figure of Mary, mother of Jesus (right).

Mitsunari Ohizumi, who edited the book Schizo / Neon Genesis Evangelion, had an interview with Hideaki Anno and compared Rei to the young women who joined the Japanese religious group Aum Shinrikyō, which carried out the Tokyo subway sarin attack in 1995, noting their complete dependence on the group's leader, Shōkō Asahara. Anno and Ohizumi described her as an unsolvable puzzle; "a spirit that tears up the heart and body in eternity"; and "the most beautiful actress in the world"; it also characterizes her through a series of dichotomies, including opium and euphoria, Satan and God, Eros and Thanatos, a cruel woman and a strong girl in junior high school, sarin for Gendo Ikari to destroy humanity and a keyhole to Pandora's box, the Great Bad Mother trying to take in her son, and hopelessness and eternal life. (Note: Regarding the quoted material, Hideaki Anno originally wrote "永遠に心と軀を引き裂かれ続ける魂" and "世界で一番美しい女優", respectively.) Hiroki Azuma described Rei's solitude as conveying an extremely realistic image of the lack of communication experienced by contemporary children. According to Azuma, Rei's inability to communicate typifies neither kogyal, or "child girl", nor otaku. He also compared her room to Satyan, the scientific laboratory of Aum Shinrikyō.

In the fourteenth episode of the anime, "Weaving a Story", Rei delivers a monologue about the world as she perceives it. During it, she asks herself "Who am I?" and addresses an unidentified interlocutor with "Who are you?"; the scene also shows multiple identical images of Rei arranged in a row. Dennis Redmond, a scholar of comparative literature, linked Ayanami's questions to "Who is No.1?", the refrain from The Prisoner, and to the key line "Who am I?" from Heiner Müller's Germania Death in Berlin. According to Redmond, these multiple images recall the clones and androids common in 1970s science fiction, but the images appearing during Rei's monologue "suggest a spectrum from classic East Asian mythology", including the creation of Monkey King in Journey to the West from the union of Heaven and Earth, evoked by Rei through the words "sky" and "mountains". Japanese academic and writer Yuya Sato compared Rei's inner monologue to the introspective narration characteristic of girls' manga, or shōjo. For example, Sakumi Yoshino's manga Eccentrics features questions about personal identity and moments of introspection similar to Rei's "Who am I?" question. Sato argued that, as in shōjo manga, Rei's question requires no definitive answer; its function lies in the act of questioning itself. Ayanami's stream of consciousness does not advance the plot; instead, she expresses her feelings chaotically through her dislikes and sympathies, a subjective world that Sato identified as another recurring theme of shōjo manga. In the Journal of International and Advanced Japanese Studies, graduate student Gabriel F. Y. Tsang noted that Rei's monologue presents no God who has granted humans a purpose to survive, so "her enquiry about the nature of Self points to nothing". Regarding the question "Who am I?", analyst Stevie Suan interpreted it as an expression of Evangelion's self-reflexivity and as a counterpoint to neoliberalist individualism.

Japanese architect Kaichiro Morikawa compared the distorted, deformed appearance of the first Rei to the installations of Tony Oursler and her bedroom to photographs by Gottfried Helnwein. Takekuma associated Rei's bandaged appearance with photographs by Romain Slocombe; Sadamoto compared her to the works of manga artist Sensha Yoshida. Throughout the series, images of the Moon frequently accompany Rei; the celestial body traditionally evokes motherhood, pallor, passivity, and femininity. Japanese engineer Yumiko Yano identified a hieratic, unattainable quality in Rei and compared her to the Virgin Mary. Yano also linked Rei to the fragile, chaste women depicted in fin de siècle art, particularly in the works of Symbolist painters. Critic Krystian Woznicki compared Rei's role to that of Pinocchio in the film 964 Pinocchio (1991), but observed that "Rei's character is quite realistic, whereas Pinocchio is completely removed from reality". Saitō described her as "the culmination of the Pygmalionism that began with Nanako SOS" and identified Ami Mizuno from Pretty Guardian Sailor Moon as a forerunner of Rei. In an editorial for Anime News Network, Kenneth Lee likewise drew parallels between Rei's development of self-awareness and that of Pinocchio and Key from Key the Metal Idol. Patrick Drazen argued that Rei, similarly to other Neon Genesis Evangelion characters, shares traits with deities from Shinto mythology, linking her to the Sun goddess Amaterasu, who is reborn at every dawn. He similarly compared the show's two other protagonists, Shinji and Asuka, to Susanoo and Ama-no-Uzume, respectively. Shinji, similarly to Susanoo, displays poor social skills and an unsociable disposition, and Asuka is ebullient and flaunts her body similarly to Uzume. According to critic Fabio Bartoli, Rei's three incarnations correspond to the three evolutionary stages of the soul postulated in the Jewish Qabbalah—Nephesh, mere animal vitality; Ruach, the normal human soul; and Neshamah, the elevated spirit resulting from the connection between man and God.

== Cultural impact ==
=== Reception ===
Reception to Rei's character has been positive. Since 1995, fans have paid tribute to her through fan fiction, fan art, and dōjinshi. Professors Patrick W. Galbraith and Kathryn Hemmann have noted Rei's particular popularity among otaku, describing her as "the single most popular and influential character in the history of otaku anime". Hemmann further described Rei as representative of Evangelion itself. In September 2007, authors for The Nikkei estimated that at least one million men across Japan felt an attachment to Rei and described her as a modern goddess emblematic of Japanese anime. (Note: The original quote in the column reads, "包帯姿で現れた現代の女神は日本アニメの申し子だ。" ["A modern goddess shown as a bandaged figure is the heaven-sent child of Japanese anime."]) The authors of this column traced this attachment to the aftermath of Japan's economic bubble, when the collapse had left the country at a low point of self-confidence; it suggested that audiences identified with the wounded Rei silently and resolutely continuing to fight, and wondered whether a sense of emptiness had persisted despite the subsequent economic recovery. According to Akiko Sugawa-Shimada, a professor, Neon Genesis Evangelion characterized a 1990s fan practice of watching episodes as they communicate online, and fans discussed critical opinions and interest in female characters in Evangelion, including Rei and Asuka Langley Soryu. The establishment of 2-Channel and similar forums allowed fans to watch the anime and discuss it with others at the same time. Similar fan activities later expanded globally with social networks such as X and YouTube.

Rei has been described by anime critics as a realistic, influential, and mysterious character. In Science Fiction Weekly, Tasha Robinson praised the conclusion of Rei's character arc. Chris Mackenzie of IGN distinguished Rei from the many similar characters that followed Evangelion, arguing that she possessed greater inner depth than the characters modeled after her. Other critics faulted her characterization as lacking personality, trite, or an unrealized opportunity. THEM Anime Reviews's Raphael See questioned the reasons behind her immense popularity. Rei's portrayal throughout the Rebuild of Evangelion films also received praise, particularly her development across the first two installments, her greater humanity compared with her characterization in the original anime, and her growing independence from Gendo. Reviewing the second film, Mark Sombillo of Anime News Network emphasized her central role in the narrative: "Her personality and plight form much more of the core motivation of the story and despite her still tryingly hesitant attempts at communication, there's genuine warmth beneath her actions and it's hard not to be won over by her." Her role in the final Rebuild film, Evangelion: 3.0+1.0 Thrice Upon a Time, received particularly positive reviews for its optimistic outlook and its depiction of Rei and the other pilots outside the militarized environment of the Evangelion battles. The A.V. Club's Mary Beth McAndrews described her journey during the film's opening section as refreshing. In the journal Mechademia, Nicolle Lamerichs noted the contrast between her life as a farmer and her former existence as an Evangelion pilot. James Whitbrook of Gizmodo described the thoroughness of her character arc in 3.0+1.0. Chris Cimi of Otaquest similarly praised her development, describing her actions as something that "make for something different and warm but still Evangelion".

=== Merchandise ===
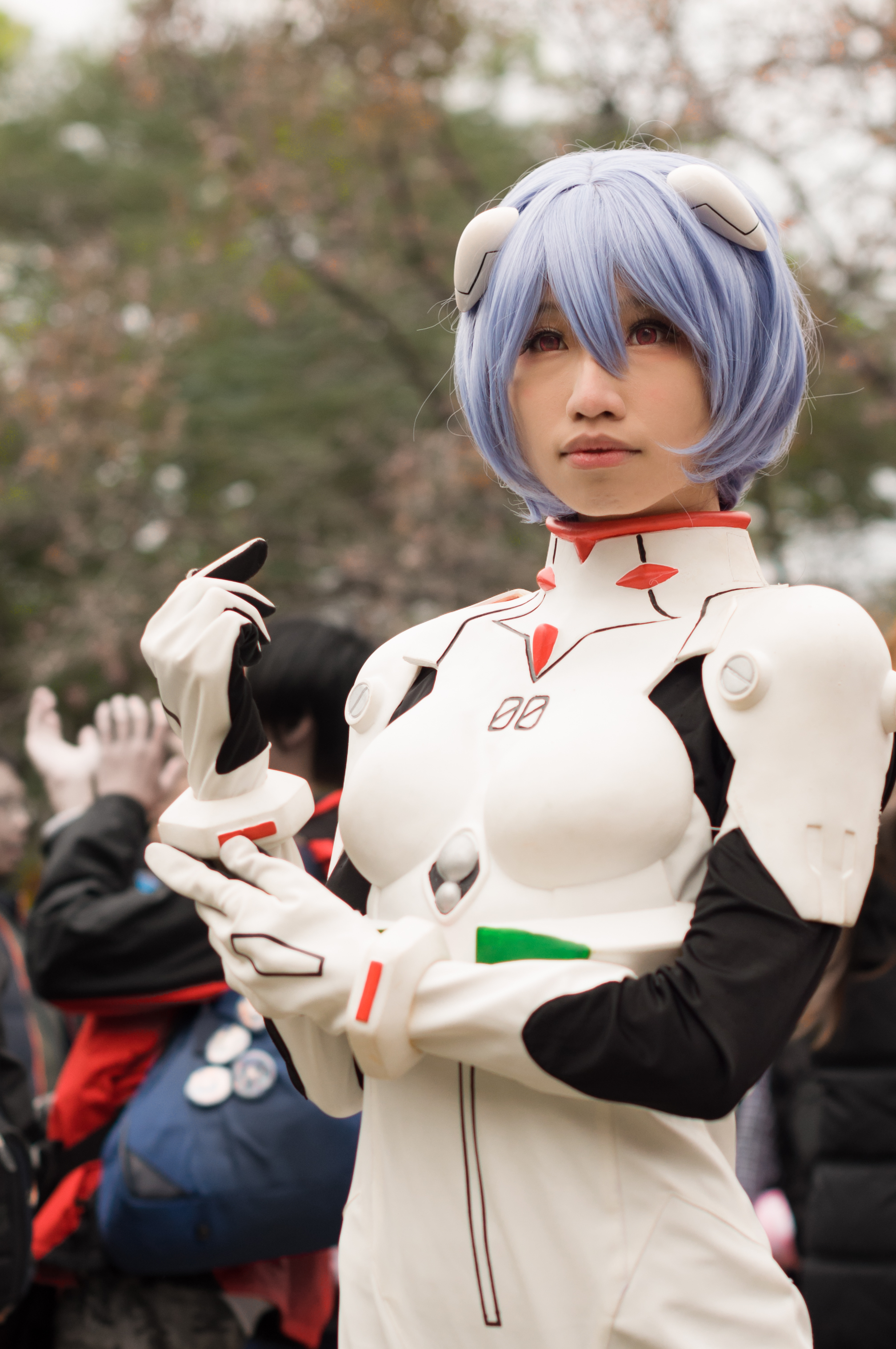
Rei's merchandise was highly popular among fans.

Rei's popularity resulted in high demand for merchandise. Merchandise featuring Rei includes figures, accessories, and a 2001 album titled Evangelion: The Birthday of Rei Ayanami. Sadamoto's design for the character achieved considerable commercial success, driving strong figure sales and extensive speculation about Rei in the press and anime criticism. In Japan, sales of Rei merchandise contributed to the expansion of the figure and fanzine markets and encouraged the creation of dedicated conventions. According to one estimate, plastic models before Evangelion sold about 3,000 units; conversely, Rei's figures sold approximately ten times as many. Evangelion's release coincided with the early expansion of the Internet and a surge in anime figure sales, increasing the visibility of the otaku community; groups of otaku searching for Rei also began frequenting Akihabara, contributing to its transformation from an electronics district into a center of otaku culture.

In 2005, for the tenth anniversary of Evangelion's first broadcast, manga artist Mine Yoshizaki designed a series of anthropomorphic Angel action figures; among them, he created a figure of Lilith based on Rei's character design. Evangelion models and toys initially recorded poor sales, but Rei's action figures quickly gained popularity and surpassed those of the Evangelion units, creating the first and perhaps the only case of a robotic anime "where reproductions of the human characters outsold those of the robots." Books and magazines featuring Rei on their covers also achieved strong sales. She also appeared on the cover of an issue of the Japanese edition of Rolling Stone. In 1997, Kadokawa Shoten published an art book devoted to the character, Evangelion Photograph – Rei. (Note: REI-レイ- 新世紀エヴァンゲリオン文庫写真集, Rei – Rei – Shinseiki Evangerion Bunko Shashin Shū) Demand for Rei figures stimulated interest in sculpting representations of the character; her commercial presence established her as an example of a virtual idol. Rei also featured in promotional collaborations between Evangelion and other organizations, including Turner Colour; Honda; Nagoya and the Aonami Line, as part of a campaign commemorating the release of Evangelion 3.0+1.0; and the Japan National Tourism Organization.

=== Legacy ===
Rei influenced Japanese animation and subsequent anime characters. Following the popularity of Evangelion, other characters sharing her aesthetic and personality traits emerged. Critics regarded Rei's success as a catalyst for the moe phenomenon. According to Deborah Shamoon, much of Evangelion's cultural impact stemmed from Rei's moe characteristics rather than its mecha and lore. Rei's injuries also played a crucial role in later events in the series and boosted sales of her merchandise. Dolores Martinez said that Rei helped redefine the concept of moe. The rise of moe encouraged the creation of characters built around specific stereotypical traits that the Japanese otaku audience could easily recognize and consume. In the late 1990s, characters bearing a close resemblance to Rei appeared on a massive scale in comics, anime, and novelizations, across both commercial and fanzine markets. According to Japanese literary critic Hiroki Azuma in his book Otaku: Japan's Database Animals, this proliferation did not result from direct imitation of Evangelion, since "the emergence of Ayanami Rei did not influence many authors so much as change the rules of the moe elements sustaining otaku culture". Authors working without Evangelion specifically in mind nevertheless created characters similar to Rei by combining recognizable moe elements, such as a silent personality, blue hair, and an absence of emotions. Azuma regarded the twenty-sixth episode, which depicts an alternate reality where Rei runs with a slice of bread in her mouth, as a turning point in otaku culture. For him, the scene marks the point where the era of "grand narratives" ends and the era of moe characters begins. Thereafter, viewers' emotional attachment to characters assumed greater importance than a series's overarching narrative.

Rei influenced the creation of Ruriko Tsukishima from Shizuku. Both characters subsequently influenced Ruri Hoshino from Martian Successor Nadesico, who in turn inspired the parodic Tsubame Ōtorii from Cyber Team in Akihabara. Azuma argued that these characters share the same underlying information and cited them to illustrate his database hypothesis. Critics have also drawn comparisons between Rei and Anthy Himemiya in Revolutionary Girl Utena, Diya in Butterfly Soup, Yashiro Kasumi in Muv-Luv, Yuri in Doki Doki Literature Club!, and the female cyborgs in Gunslinger Girl. Serial Experiments Lain's Lain Iwakura has likewise been associated with Rei; Lain's principal screenwriter, Chiaki J. Konaka, stated that Evangelion had not influenced the series and, although he appreciated both characters' traits, said he saw no similarities between them. Conversely, Tamaki Saitō argued that Lain's decision to annihilate herself in Lain parallels Rei's decision in Evangelion. Critics Tomás Stiegwardt and Gabriel Los Santos compared Ahsoka Tano from Star Wars to Rei, describing both characters as reticent. The modern female incarnation of Lu Meng in Dragon Destiny also draws her appearance from Rei's design.

Zoltan Kacsuk, a researcher, found that visual novels were more likely than anime and manga to feature characters sharing moe characteristics with figures such as Rei, and that such characters became especially common in the late 2000s and early 2010s. Analyst Ryo Katsumata regarded Rei as mukuchi, (Note: 無口, lit. 'mouthless') or reticent, and argued that reticence, blue hair, and eyepatches contributed to the development of new characters designed to appeal to otaku, including moe characters. Characters with her hairstyle frequently appeared in erotic comics shortly after Evangelion's success. The character also set an example for the kuudere (Note: クーデレ) stereotype, a term for characters who hide their true feelings behind a melancholic and cold façade. According to Kaichiro Morikawa, a Japanese architect and cultural academic, characters with physical defects were rare before Evangelion and Rei; examples included Char Aznable in Mobile Suit Gundam, who has a scar on his forehead, and Kushana in Nausicaä of the Valley of the Wind. The Japanese band Rey derived its name from her. Singer and guitarist Motoo Fujiwara wrote the lyrics to the song "Arue", inspired by Rei; its English title, "R.A.", derives from her initials. During the Victoria's Secret Fashion Show 2012, English model Jourdan Dunn wore an outfit resembling the character's plugsuit, the bodysuit worn by the Evangelion pilots; Gainax learned of the outfit only through the Internet and expressed confusion over the situation. According to Monica Kim of Vogue, her plugsuit also inspired a garment in the fashion house Louis Vuitton's spring 2016 collection.

== See also ==
- List of Neon Genesis Evangelion characters
