= Neon Genesis Evangelion (manga) =

Japanese manga series

- Cover of the first tankōbon volume, featuring Shinji Ikari (front) and Gendo Ikari (back)

新世紀エヴァンゲリオン (Shin Seiki Evangelion)
- Genre: Apocalyptic; Mecha; Psychological drama
- Created by: Gainax (1994–2007); Khara/Gainax (2007–2013)
- Manga
- Written by: Yoshiyuki Sadamoto
- Published by: Kadokawa Shoten
- English publisher: AUS: Madman Entertainment; NA: Viz Media; SEA: Chuang Yi
- Magazine: Monthly Shōnen Ace (1994–2008); Young Ace (2009–2013)
- Original run: December 26, 1994 – June 4, 2013
- Volumes: 14
- TV anime
- Neon Genesis Evangelion
- Anime films
- Revival of Evangelion; Death & Rebirth (March 1997); The End of Evangelion (July 1997); Rebuild of Evangelion; 1.0 You Are (Not) Alone. (2007); 2.0 You Can (Not) Advance. (2009); 3.0 You Can (Not) Redo. (2012); 3.0+1.0 Thrice Upon a Time (2021)
- Spin-off manga
- Angelic Days; Shinji Ikari Raising Project; Campus Apocalypse; Petit Eva

Neon Genesis Evangelion (Japanese: 新世紀エヴァンゲリオン, Hepburn: Shin Seiki Evangelion) is a Japanese manga series written and illustrated by Yoshiyuki Sadamoto and published by Kadokawa Shoten. It began in Monthly Shōnen Ace in December 1994 and later moved to Young Ace, finishing in June 2013. It consists of 14 volumes, each composed of several "stages" or chapters. It was initially released before the anime series Neon Genesis Evangelion by Gainax and Tatsunoko Production and was originally intended as a companion adaptation to the TV series.

== Plot ==
Sadamoto was the original character designer for the anime with Hideaki Anno as the supervisor and animated only part of the original anime for the purpose of writing the manga version. However, in the early days, he was involved in some way up to the sixth episode by coming up with ideas, and in the 24th episode he was the animation supervisor.

As in the anime, the manga is focused on Shinji Ikari, a teenage boy who was recruited by his father Gendo to the shadowy organization Nerv to pilot a giant bio-machine mecha named "Evangelion" into combat against beings called "Angels". The plot, however, features numerous small differences from the plot of the anime, including Toji Suzuhara's death, the omission of five Angels, and an earlier introduction of Kaworu Nagisa or Tabris. Shinji's character and personality, alongside various other characters from the series, such as Asuka Langley Soryu's, are also slightly different in the manga.

The manga volumes do not always begin or end at points corresponding to episode breaks. For example, Volume 10 begins halfway through the battle with Armisael in episode 23, and Volume 11 adapts the events depicted in episode 24 and the first several minutes of episode 25'.

== Characters ==
Shinji Ikari
Shinji Ikari is invited to Tokyo-3 by his father Gendo Ikari to pilot a mecha known as the Evangelion Unit 01. Shinji reluctantly agrees, and despite a rough start he learns to use Unit 01 to protect the city from creatures known as Angels that threaten to destroy mankind.
Unlike in the anime, Shinji's eyes are brown instead of blue. He is also less introverted and expresses himself more, although he is still plagued by self-doubt and hatred for his father. Shinji in the manga is also considerably more aggressive, and develops deep feelings for Rei and Asuka.
Rei Ayanami
Rei Ayanami is the First Child and pilot of Evangelion Unit 00. At the beginning of the series she is an enigmatic figure whose unusual behavior confounds her peers. However, she progressively becomes more involved with the people around her, and is revealed to be a key factor in the events that conclude the storyline. A 2014 interview with Sadamoto states Rei and Shinji have love for each other, with Rei as a motherly existence.
She is slightly more talkative than in the anime and becomes more connected with the people around her, largely through her interactions with Shinji. The manga shows her thoughts and feelings, and shows she is indirectly in love with him, however Sadamoto clarifies no character connected fully with Shinji.
Asuka Langley Soryu
Asuka Langley Soryu is the Second Child and the pilot of the Evangelion Unit 02.
She is depicted as a blonde in the manga, rather than red-haired. She is not as verbally aggressive toward Shinji and more open about her true feelings. While she still can be difficult to get along with and initially puts on a "good girl" facade in front of authority figures, she actually does have a more mature, caring and friendly side to her unlike the anime counterpart. She is also much better friends with Shinji. Sadamoto decided to portray their dance montage as a kiss in place of the one in the original series, Asuka would be Shinji's symbol for his longing for the opposite sex, differently from Rei. It is when she drops her facade that she begins to truly improve and be more open. Her feelings for Shinji are not quite as easily discovered in the manga, though it is hinted in various chapters that she is attracted to him. She is a test-tube baby of genius parents, her first meeting with Shinji and his friends is different as Asuka acts more childish than in the series, and she is left in a comatose state immediately after being defeated by the Angel Arael. She fights together with Shinji just before Third Impact and they meet again in the final chapter.
Kaworu Nagisa
Kaworu Nagisa is the Fifth Child, and is eventually revealed to be the seventeenth Angel, Tabris. He is introduced as a replacement pilot for Unit 02 after Asuka Langley Soryu's synchronization ratio falls below usability.
Kaworu is introduced earlier in the manga storyline. He fights the Angel Armisael alongside Rei in Unit 02. Kaworu is portrayed as being ignorant of many aspects of social interaction, creating some comic relief, but is also colder and more of an unsettling presence than in the anime. Because of this, Shinji dislikes and distrusts Kaworu, while Kaworu makes advances toward Shinji and is upset that Shinji does not return his advances. Sadamoto stated this is because Kaworu picks up Rei's emotions, though Sadamoto stated he wrote their relationship as similar to a high school student causing an impression on a younger, middle-school one, not romance, and that Shinji ultimately rejects him.
Toji Suzuhara
Toji Suzuhara is the Fourth Child. He dislikes Shinji for being indirectly responsible for his sister getting injured, but eventually comes to respect him, and the two become friends.
Toji's English-translated dialogue is heavily accented (due to him being from Osaka), and his hair color is changed. He is more verbally abusive toward Asuka, calling her "bitch" multiple times. He is killed during volume 6 of the manga series instead of being crippled. Additionally, Shinji is aware that Toji is the pilot of Unit 03 before the battle against Bardiel.
Ryoji Kaji
Ryoji Kaji appears to be a triple agent, working as the chief inspection officer for Nerv (Internal Affairs) while secretly investigating Nerv for the Japanese government, and at times seemingly acting as a cat's-paw both for and against Gendo Ikari and Seele.
He is given more of a back story in the manga; he tells Shinji of his past to motivate Shinji to return to Nerv after the fight against Bardiel in a hidden supply closet. Asuka's crush on him is also expanded on in the manga, with Kaji describing himself as a "weak" and "wretched" man after Asuka's confession.
Yui Ikari/Unit 01
Yui Ikari was a student of genetic engineering at Kyoto University, where she met her future husband Gendo. She served as the test subject for the Contact Experiment of Unit 01, but disappeared during testing. Though proclaimed dead, her soul lives on in Unit 01.
In the manga, in addition to the presence of Yui's soul in Unit 01, the Eva's Angelic aspect has its own identity, depicted as the unarmored Eva. This being shows itself to both Shinji and Rei while they are synchronized with the Eva, and it attempts to trap Shinji inside the Eva with itself after the battle with the Angel Zeruel by taking Yui's form and manipulating Shinji's desire for contact with his mother. Rei is able to establish a mental link with this Angelic part of Unit 01 while outside the Eva, and the two acknowledge that they are directly connected to each other.

== Publication history ==
Unlike it is sometimes assumed, the manga is in fact not the original version of the story, but instead it was created as a supplemental designed to promote the TV series. Sadamoto has also repeatedly stated that the manga is his own individual work and should never be used as reference for anything in the anime. Sadamoto has also stated he made the manga entirely on his own, without consulting anyone, in contrast to the anime's more collaborative production, and that all differences were decided by him. He has also denied links to the Rebuild movies, specifying that the bonus chapter featuring Mari is fan service.

Neon Genesis Evangelion was created after a meeting between Hideaki Anno and King Records. Although the anime series was conceived before the manga, due to production delays the manga was released first in Kadokawa Shoten's Monthly Shōnen Ace on December 26, 1994.

When the series finally appeared on TV in October 1995, Sadamoto's manga storyline had completed what would later become volumes 1 to 3, matching the storyline of episodes 5 and 6 of the TV series. The anime rapidly outpaced the manga, to the point that the chapters comprising volume 4 (which included content corresponding to TV episode 8) were not released until over a year after the TV series had finished airing.

Despite an ostensible publishing schedule of one "stage" (chapter) each month in Shōnen Ace, Sadamoto's actual publication schedule was irregular as he divided his time between other projects, releasing a new volume roughly every year and a half. For example, between the publication in Japan of volume 4 and volume 5, two years elapsed. While the manga ran for more than 18 years, only 14 volumes were published.

In 2008, it was announced that the Neon Genesis Evangelion manga was approaching its conclusion. In July 2009, it was moved to a new Kadokawa Shoten seinen magazine, Young Ace, where it was published until the February 2010 issue. At that point Sadamoto stopped writing the manga, putting the publication on hiatus in order to work on the latest Rebuild of Evangelion film. The December 2010 issue of Young Ace announced that the manga would resume that winter (early 2011); the April 2011 issue announced the next stage would be published April 4, 2011.

On February 12, 2012, half of the 90th Stage was published, telling different events from the ones seen in episode 26' from The End of Evangelion. This was reportedly the final chapter. On May 2, 2012, Kadokawa Shoten announced that the 13th volume of the manga would be released on November 2, 2012, with ANN noting that "neither Sadamoto nor Kadokawa has confirmed that the 13th manga volume is still the final one", and indeed it was not. Serialization resumed, and in April 2013 Kadokawa Shoten announced that the manga would end in two more chapters. The last chapter was published on June 4, 2013, and the 14th and last volume was released on November 20, 2014.

A seven volume aizōban edition was published between January 26 and April 26, 2021.

=== English release ===
Viz Media published the series in multiple versions, the first phase like regular comic issues was published from December 6, 1998, to May 2003, a tankōbon Collector's Edition was published from February 1, 2002, to May 2003 as Volumes 1–7. Viz claims that its releases of Evangelion were the first releases of an unflipped manga in English. In August 2011, Viz Media started releasing the manga chapter-by-chapter digitally through its Apple apps.

== Reception ==
With the success of the anime, the manga has also become a commercial success; the first 10 volumes have sold over 15 million copies, and the 11th volume reached #1 on the Tohan charts, taking the total to over 17 million. In particular, as the manga drew closer to its conclusion, attention surrounding it reached new heights, with the 11th volume staying on top of the Japanese Comic Ranking charts for 4 straight weeks, a remarkable achievement even for a long-running series. It won the 1996 Comicker fan manga poll. Volume 12 opened at #1 on Oricon's manga rankings and has sold over 600,000 copies. The manga sold 25 million copies.

== See also ==
- Future history
- Near future in fiction
