= Fumino Hayashi =

Japanese manga artist

Fumino Hayashi 林ふみの
- Born: January 23 Fukui
- Area: Manga artist
- Notable works: Neon Genesis Evangelion: Angelic Days

Fumino Hayashi (林ふみの, Hayashi Fumino) is a Japanese manga artist of Neon Genesis Evangelion: Angelic Days, a manga based on the anime Neon Genesis Evangelion by Gainax). This was the first project Hayashi had worked on for Kadokawa Shoten.
