= Both of You, Dance Like You Want to Win! =

- Neon Genesis Evangelion episode
- The episode's final battle, in which the two Evas fight in unison and act as one, received praise from critics.
- Episode no.: Episode 9
- Directed by: Seiji Mizushima
- Written by: Hideaki Anno, Akio Satsukawa
- Original air date: November 29, 1995
- Running time: 22 minutes

Episode chronology
← Previous "Asuka Strikes!"	Next → "Magmadiver"

"Both of You, Dance Like You Want to Win!", also known by the Japanese title "Moment, Heart, Together" (Note: Japanese: 瞬間、心、重ねて, Hepburn: Shunkan, kokoro, kasanete) is the ninth episode of the Japanese anime television series Neon Genesis Evangelion, which was created by animation studio Gainax. The episode, written by Hideaki Anno and Akio Satsukawa and directed by Seiji Mizushima, was first broadcast on TV Tokyo on November 29, 1995. The series is set fifteen years after a worldwide cataclysm and is mostly set in the futuristic, fortified city of Tokyo-3. The series' protagonist is Shinji Ikari, a teenage boy who is recruited by his father Gendo to the organization Nerv to pilot a gigantic biomechanical mecha named Evangelion into combat with beings called Angels. The episode follows two Nerv mecha pilots, Asuka Langley Soryu and Shinji, who must defeat an Angel capable of splitting into two individuals, Israfel.

Anno conceived the episode to lighten the tone of the series after the previous episodes, which were characterized by an introspective, psychological mood. Shinji Higuchi, who worked with Anno on Nadia: The Secret of Blue Water and is known for his work's humor, drew the storyboards, giving the story a comedic tone. The installment contains cultural references to history, religion, films, series, and previous works by the Gainax studio. The episode's first broadcast scored a 7.1% audience share on Japanese television, and was well-received by audiences and critics. Reviewers appreciated the episode's humor, music score, and action, ranking it as one of the best episodes in the series. Particularly positive was the reception given to the second and final clash of the installment, featuring the two mecha Evangelion 01 and 02 synchronized to music, which is also considered one of the best in the anime.

== Plot ==
Asuka Langley Soryu, the pilot of the mecha Evangelion Unit-02 who has recently arrived in Japan from Germany, moves in with Misato Katsuragi, commander of the special agency Nerv, and starts living with Shinji Ikari, pilot of the Eva-01. She and Shinji intercept the seventh in a series of mankind's enemies called Angels, Israfel, along Suruga Bay. Asuka, eager to show off her skills, strikes the enemy by slashing it with her Sonic Glaive; shortly afterward, however, Israfel splits into two small individuals, who defeat the two pilots and are temporarily stopped by the United Nations forces. While waiting for the enemy to resume its advance, Asuka and Shinji, under Misato's guidance, try to train themselves by synchronizing all their actions. After several days and nights spent acting in harmony in all the motions of daily life, Shinji and Asuka sleep alone at Misato's house, and Asuka urges Shinji not to enter her room. That night Asuka apparently sleepwalks into Shinji's room and lies down next to him. Shinji tries to kiss her, but stops himself when she starts calling out for her mother in her sleep. Meanwhile, Misato finds herself in a lift with her former lover, Ryoji Kaji, who kisses her. During the second clash against Israfel, Asuka and Shinji, aboard their Evangelions, perfectly synchronize their movements to a musical accompaniment and within a minute manage to defeat the enemy.

== Production ==
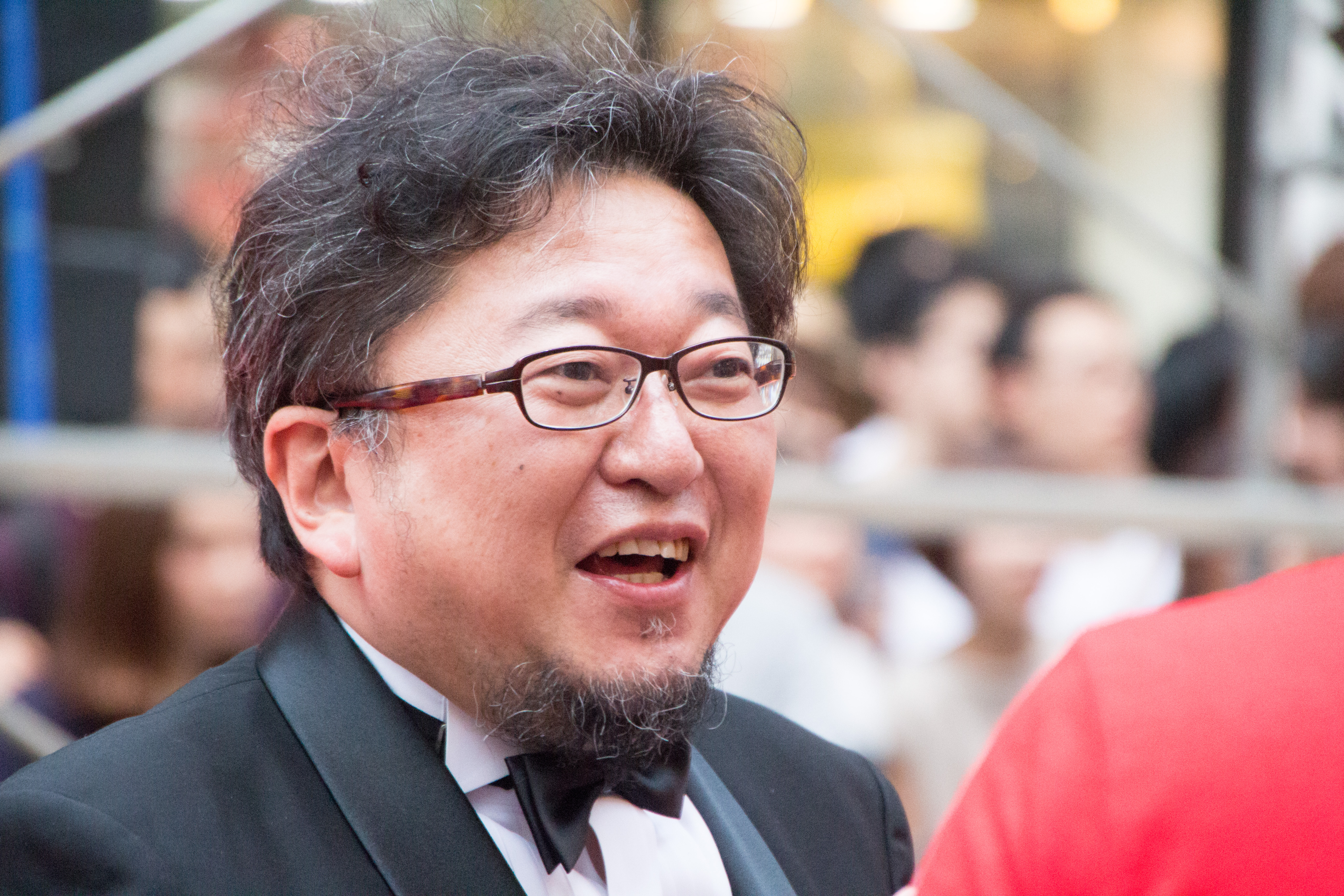
Shinji Higuchi drew the storyboard for the episode.

Neon Genesis Evangelion first six episodes left the staff drained and feeling weighed down by the show's heavy mood; Hideaki Anno, director of the series, consequently decided to lighten the show's tone in the following episodes. Anno then inserted Asuka to lighten the installments, introducing her as a sunny, extroverted girl, but without thinking to re-evaluate her character much as in the final episodes of the series, and without foreshadowing. Particularly important was the contribution of Shinji Higuchi, who had already worked on Nadia: The Secret of Blue Water and was known for the humorous character of his works. Higuchi infused the episode with an adolescent and comic tone, similar to his previous works. Gainax studio decided on the basic plot for "Both of You, Dance Like You Want to Win!" in 1993, when it wrote a presentation document of Neon Genesis Evangelion titled New Century Evangelion (tentative name) Proposal (新世紀エヴァンゲリオン (仮) 企画書, Shinseiki Evangelion (kari) kikakusho). The Proposal, published in 1994, describes "the Eva's first beside-water battle". Akio Satsukawa and Anno wrote the script for the episode, whose storyboards were edited by Higuchi. Seiji Mizushima was chosen as the director, Shinya Hasegawa worked as the chief animator, and Mahiro Maeda and Mitsumu Wogi as the assistant character designers. Maeda also worked on Israfel's design.

Hasegawa worked on the scene in which Shinji tries to kiss Asuka, while Ogura Nobutoshi drew the scene of Shinji and Asuka's final phone call. The first battle against Israfel was done by Fumitomo Kizaki. Masayuki took care of Asuka and Shinji's six days of preparation; Keisuke Watabe served as the person in charge of the first half of the final battle, while Yutaka Nakamura worked on the second half. Hasegawa also personally recruited new members to add to the animation staff, including artists not usually associated with Gainax works. The result, similar to Yoshinori Kanada's animations, such as perspective kicks and playful drawings, stood apart from the other Evangelion episodes. Staff conceived it as part of the "action arc" of the series, which features lighter comical tones compared to the previous installments. Furthermore, writer Alexandre Marine noted how Rei Ayanami, a silent and quite character which was the focus of the previous episodes, has just a few lines in a brief scene in the whole installment; director Anno himself said he did not feel particularly interested in her character. Shinji Higuchi stated that he paid particular attention to the characters' postures and expressions to lend greater realism to the story, given the limitations of animation, not limiting himself to drawing characters standing or walking while reciting their lines. He also noted that musical montages of training or battles are a well-established tradition at Gainax; this visual device was used not only in Gunbuster and Nadia, but also in Daicon III and IV Opening Animations (1981-1983) and Royal Space Force: The Wings of Honnêamise (1987). Anno also gave Higuchi personal directions, suggesting that Asuka be portrayed as a cleanliness fanatic. He further proposed a scene in which Asuka is frightened by Misato's pet penguin, mirroring Shinji's reaction in "The Beast".

In the episode's original draft, Gainax planned a slightly different battle. During the first battle, rather than splitting into two from the bottom up after being struck by Asuka, Israfel was instead meant to split in two suddenly in the middle of the fight and strike the powerless Eva-01 with a kick; after the battle, Shinji would have been extracted from the Eva and warmed himself by a fire while wrapped in a blanket. During the second battle, Israfel was meant to adopt a silhouette resembling an Eva as a form of camouflage, and the fight was to be slightly shorter. Compared to the other episodes, this episode is distinguished by the abundant use of special animation techniques such as residual images and kinetic deformations. For this purpose, the characters' faces were deformed to unreal expressions, exaggerating movements, and caricatures. For the scene in which Misato screams with glasses in her hands, the staff used a wide-angle lens; this was not indicated in the script, as it was chosen later by the direction. Evangelion Chronicle, an official encyclopedia of the series, noted that the scene in which Shinji and Asuka argue at Misato's apartment first relies on long shots framing the characters in full, then shifts to close-ups of their faces, creating a strong visual rhythm. For the final battle, the Evas' coordination is technically replicated by a montage consisting of hand-drawn and digitally composited graphics by means of which both the two Evas' and their pilots' bodies appear to merge; the images were obtained by cutting and combining the images of Asuka and Shinji with their respective Evas along the vertical central axis. The series' staff composed the soundtrack before producing the animation for the scene; Evangelion music composer Shirō Sagisu therefore described the production process as "reverse spotting", with the music coming first and the battle visuals later synchronized to it. Gainax initially considered using a preexisting piece of music for the battle. Takehito Koyasu, Tomokazu Seki, Tetsuya Iwanaga, Hiro Yūki, and Kōichi Yamadera, voice actors of several main characters in the series, played unidentified characters in the episode. The staff also used the songs "You Are My Only One", "Aoi Legend" and "Toi sora no yakusoku" by Kotono Mitsuishi, Misato Katsuragi's voice actress, from the image album Lilia 〜 from Ys, while Yōko Takahashi sang the final theme song for the episode, entitled "Acid Bossa Version", a rendition of "Fly Me to the Moon" with a bossa nova and acid house sound. In late home video editions of the series, staff replaced Yōko Takahashi's version with an "Asuka Bossa Techno" version.

== Cultural references ==
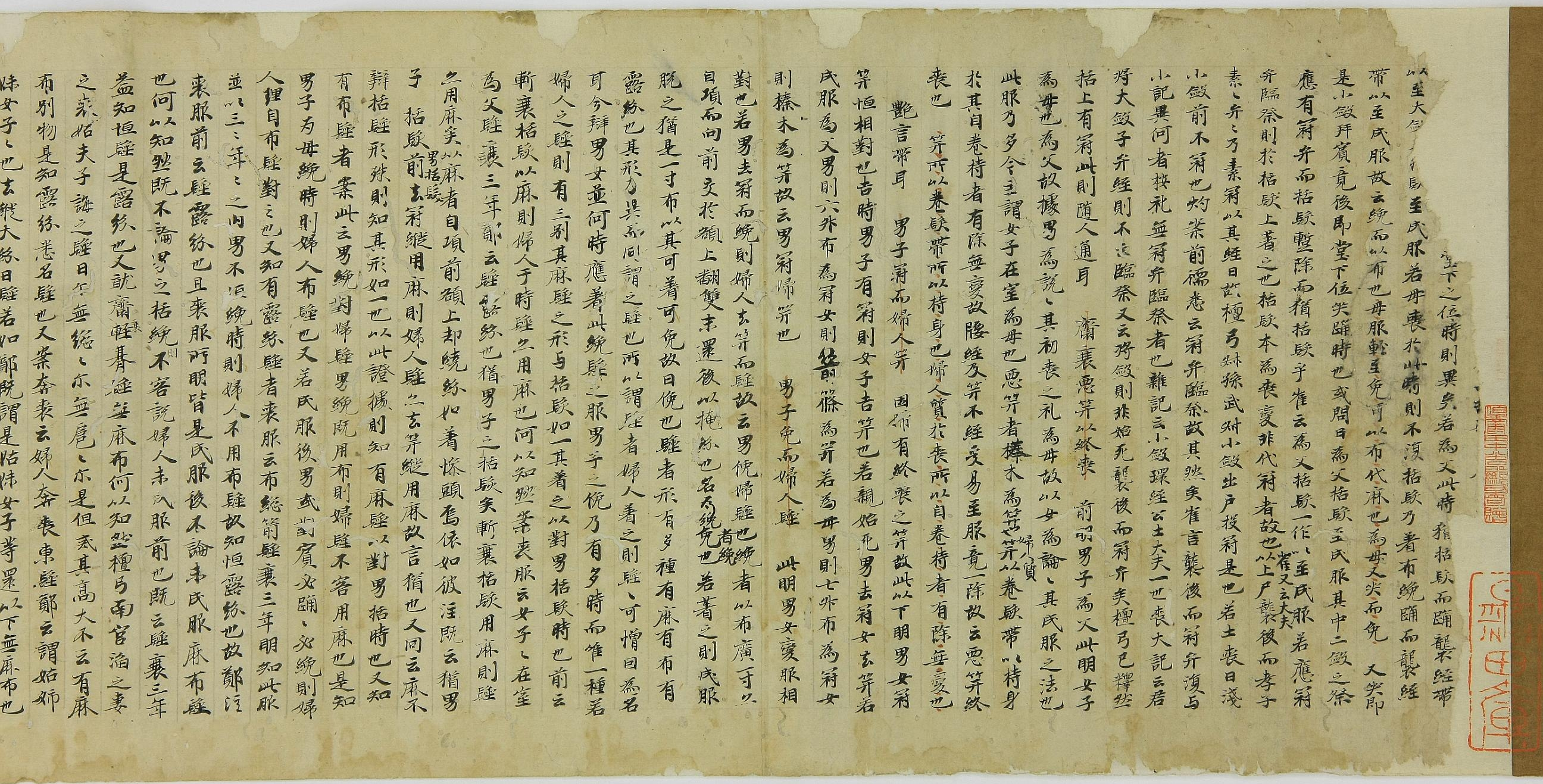
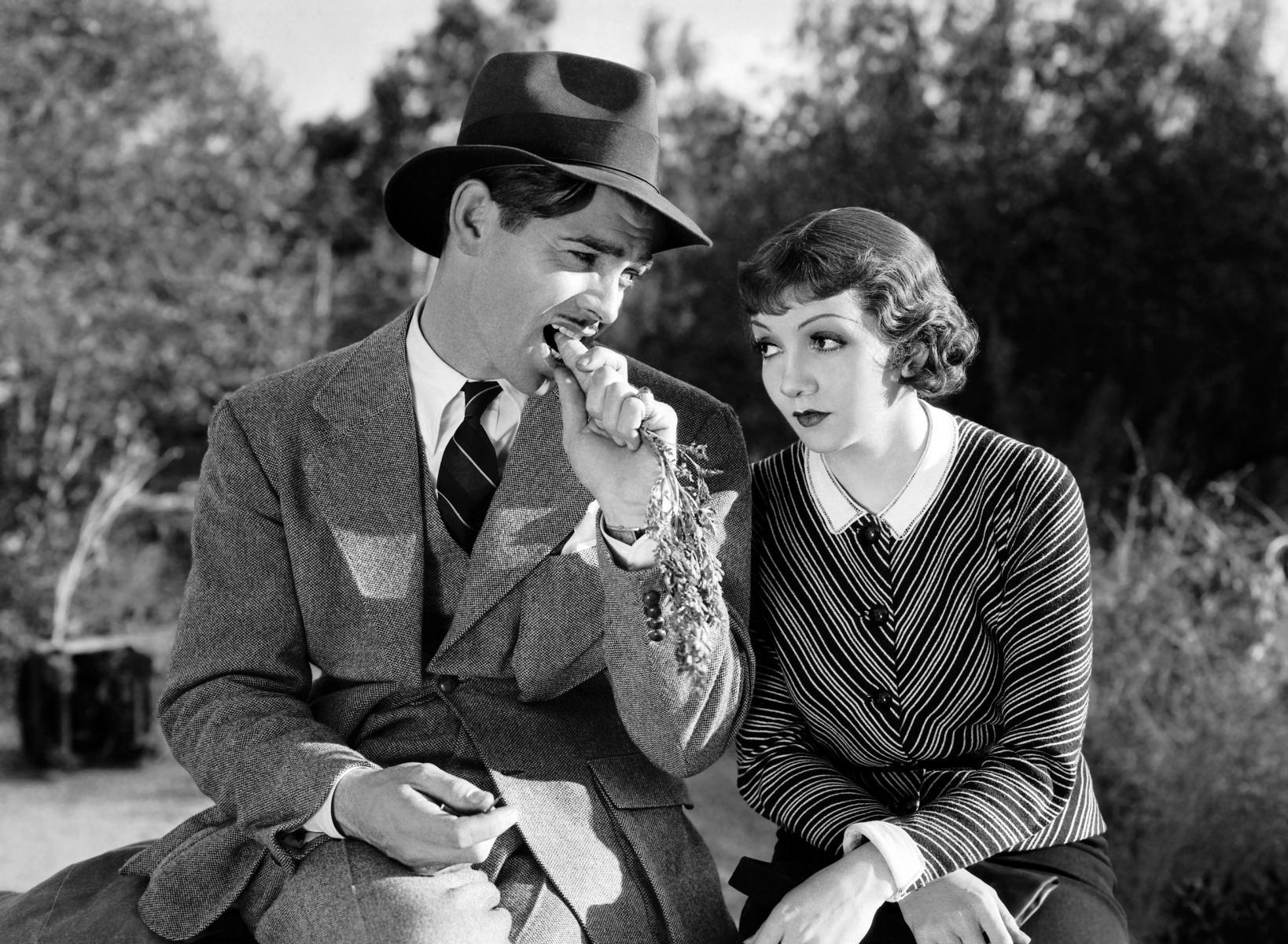
"Both of You, Dance Like You Want to Win!" references the Confucian Book of Rites and It Happened One Night (1934).

"Both of You, Dance Like You Want to Win!" contains references to films, historical concepts, or previous works by Hideaki Anno. Asuka, for example, awkwardly quotes an existing Confucian proverb from the Book of Rites, while the training between her and Shinji has been compared to the game of twister. During the episode, Asuka takes refuge in Misato's room to avoid sleeping alone in the same room with Shinji. The sliding door separating them is renamed by her the "unshakable walls of Jericho". This nickname refers to the battle of Jericho, a biblical episode narrated in the book of Joshua, and the movie It Happened One Night (1934). In one of the most famous scenes in the film, the two main characters spend a night in the same motel room, using a blanket as a divider between their beds, called by the characters themselves "walls of Jericho". In another scene, "Blood Type: Blue" is glimpsed on Ritsuko's PC, in reference to the Japanese title of Kihachi Okamoto's Blue Christmas (1978).

The final battle of the episode has been compared to tokusatsu shows. Yūichirō Oguro, editor of extra materials contained in the Evangelion Japanese home video releases, compared the battle of the two Evangelions without external power with Ultraman, the protagonist of the Ultraman franchise, who could only fight for a few minutes of activity; he and Gualtiero Cannarsi, responsible for the first Italian Evangelion localisation, also noted how in one sequence the body of the Angel defeated in the sixth episode, Ramiel, is visible. Oguro thus described this episode as a more realistic version of the tokusatsu of his childhood. The cut in which the legs of the Evangelions are seen toppled under the ground has been described as an homage to Kon Ichikawa's The Inugami Family (1976) and Shinji Sōmai's Typhoon Club (1985). Even the typefaces used in the titles of this and other episodes of the series, characterized by an unconventional sense of reading, have been interpreted as an homage to the style of Ichikawa.

During the course of the episode, the JS Haruna cruiser is mentioned, while in the scene where Kensuke Aida and Toji Suzuhara sell pictures of Asuka, a text about the Tenshō embassy is glimpsed. Israfel's two little individual parts are named Kō and Otsu by Nerv; their names come from the series of Heavenly Stems, a system of ordinals indigenous to China. Writer Dennis Redmond described "Both of You, Dance Like You Want to Win!" as the Neon Genesis Evangelion's most explicit comic parody of the mecha genre; he also noted that the final battle references "the shot techniques of the televised sports event and Olympic gymnastics routine". Jacob Parker-Dalton, a writer for the website Otaquest, mentioned the installment as an example of the influence of Space Battleship Yamato, Ultraman, and Mobile Suit Gundam on Anno. Other references are to earlier Gainax works. Ritsuko wears glasses similar to Electra's character from Nadia: The Secret of Blue Water in one scene, while the holograms with which Asuka and Shinji communicate, used unrealistically during conversations, have been compared to those in Gunbuster. During the first confrontation against Israfel, a building with the sign "Studio Fantasia", a name listed as an associate producer on the staff of Gainax's Otaku no video, appears.

== Themes and analysis ==
According to DVD Talk, this and other installments of the arc add a lot more "heart and soul" to the story, with a combination of action, comedy, and even dramatic moments. An official pamphlet of the series compared it to the island arc of Nadia. The episode focuses on several themes in the series, such as the value of masculinity or the analysis of interpersonal relationships. Cannarsi noted how the script analogizes the couples of Shinji and Asuka and that of Misato and Kaji, who both have kissing scenes during "Both of You, Dance Like You Want to Win!"; the former is characterized by adolescent tones, awkwardness, and uncertainty, while Misato and Kaji's has a much more adult sensuality. Moreover, the encyclopedia magazine Evangelion Chronicle noted how Asuka's personality is emphasized as she steps on love letters addressed to her in the first scenes. Asuka flaunts her strength, but she is beaten in combat by Israfel, and in training with Shinji she is initially unsuccessful. Newtype and Animedia magazines noted that she places herself in a physically higher position in the scene where she meets Rei for the first time, but she also cries in the bed scene with Shinji, saying the word "mama" in her sleep. Protoculture Addicts magazine also noted that Rei is unaffected and unimpressed by Asuka. When Asuka suggests that they become friends for convenience's sake, Rei responds by saying that she will do so if ordered to. According to writer Claudio Cordella, the feelings of veiled hostility towards Rei that Asuka shows confirm her competitive nature. The episode, therefore, depicts Asuka's inner fragility, hidden by her aggressive and seemingly strong façade.

During the preparations for the battle against Israfel, Shinji and Asuka synchronize perfectly at the end. Writer Virginie Nebbia noted how this leads nowhere, and later the scriptwriters regress Shinji. Analyzing Shinji's psyche, psychiatrist Kōji Mizobe stated that the fundamental characteristic of Shinji is sociability, describing him as a "sympathetic person" who accepts and imitates others. Mizobe interpreted the scenes in which he synchronizes with Asuka's movements as proof of this ability. Cannarsi also noted how in "Both of You, Dance Like You Want to Win!" Asuka scorns and questions Shinji's value, especially as a man, with barbs like "Are you stupid?" or "You're a man, aren't you?". According to scholar Katherine Savoy, "Shinji's actions are judged beside his sex as if he has failed to commit to his manhood, or is unable to live up to his gender's strength". Anime Feminist writers similarly noted Shinji is asked to perform hyper-masculinity in order to survive the world, and Asuka criticizes him for being quiet instead. Her behavior has been likened to a latent inferiority complex toward the male sex or a masculine protest, a psychological term coined by Alfred Adler to describe feelings present in women who are tired of the passive role typically associated with femininity, later reprised in the "Don't Be" episode. In an essay on the series, Japanese academic Yuya Sato noted how the series contains several elements of manga directed toward a young female audience, known as shōjo. From Asuka's arrival onward, however, Evangelion features several elements of boys' manga, named shōnen, such as effort, friendship, and victory over enemies. All three of these themes are present in the installment: Asuka and Shinji strive together on synchronicity, solidarity is created between the two, and they win against the Angel. According to Sato, "Both of You, Dance Like You Want to Win!" is a rare moment of balance between shōjo and shōnen elements, but the shōnen elements constitute a lure to attract men to shōjo.

According to writer Álvaro Arbonés, this arc of the series is dedicated to the theme of synchronization with others, already introduced in "Asuka Strikes!" during a peak of synchronization in the battle against Gaghiel. Academic Sano Yusuki noted how the Evas are usually depicted as uncontrollable mecha in the series; this episode, in which Asuka and Shinji perfectly control their units, is an exception. Writer Andrew M. Winters compared the battle against Israfel to Joseph Campbell's theories in The Hero with a Thousand Faces. As in Campbell's narrative theory, the archetypical hero, in this case Shinji, must adapt quickly and change, facing the Angels' ability to adapt to their surroundings. Rei beats Asuka in synchronization with Shinji in one scene; Asuka thus becomes more motivated, as she defines herself based on her personal success and honor. Arbonés believes Asuka is annoyed that it is another girl who is bonding with Shinji. Arbonés therefore interpreted the entire episode as a metaphor for love and the need to be honest with one's feelings, "without being unconsciously guided by one's own wounds", since Misato maintains a façade with Kaji and Asuka with Shinji. Shinji, in the process, discovers a childish side to Asuka in the scene where he tries to kiss her in her sleep and she calls for her mother while she sleeps. Shinji understands that Asuka's attitude is just a façade, and that, like him, she is a fragile teenager with hurt feelings. In one scene, Shinji shows sympathy for Asuka, smiling. During the night, Asuka tells Shinji not to enter the room, raising the "Walls of Jericho". In the extended home video version of the twenty-second episode, "Don't Be", Gainax added images of Asuka hanging her head in dejection with the sliding door closed. From Asuka's dialogue that overlaps these scenes, it becomes clear that her frustration stems from the fact that she is seeking help and love from Shinji.

== Reception ==
"Both of You, Dance Like You Want to Win!" was first broadcast on November 29, 1995, and drew a 7.1% audience share on Japanese television. In 1996 it ranked second in Animage's Anime Grand Prix poll about the best anime episodes of the year with 567 votes. In July 2020, Comic Book Resources reported an 8.2/10 rating on IMDb for the installment, ranking it tenth among the highest-rated Neon Genesis Evangelion episodes.

The episode was well received by critics, who praised the direction, the humour, the action, and the music of the installment. Screen Rant, for example, listed the battle against Israfel among the best fights in the series. Film School Rejects' Max Covill ranked it second among the best episodes of the series; according to Covill, the installment doesn't move the plot forward in any particularly exciting way, but praised it for having the "most hilarious moments of the series" and the "excellent combat sequence". He also lauded the scene in which Asuka and Shinji blame each other for the first defeat and the one in which they try to synchronize for the final battle. The Anime Café's Akio Nagatomi praised the performance of the voice actors, the humour, and the second fight against Israfel. Writer Dennis Dedmond similarly praised Anno's scriptwriting, the near-kiss scene between Asuka and Shinji, and the "gorgeously choreographed" final battle. KKBox's Tomoyuki Mori described the namesake soundtrack, used during the battle, as "one of the most famous Evangelion songs"; according to Mori, it combines "lightness, sadness and strength".

Other reviewers on Comic Book Resources criticized certain aspects of the characterization of the protagonists. Theo Kogod criticized Asuka's behavior, as well as Misato's decision to let her and Shinji live in her apartment. Andrew Tefft similarly took a negative view of Asuka for her authoritarian attitude in the first battle and for blaming Shinji during the synchronized training. Conversely, Kristy Anderson, writing for the Supanova Expo website, mentioned the training among the best moments of Shinji's character, while SyFy Wire's Daniel Dockery described the final fight as a "beautiful display of action choreography". Digitally Obsessed! reviewer Jeff Ulmer gave a positive review of the home video issue with "Both of You, Dance Like You Want to Win!" and its action arc for its humour and characterization. Dengeki Online similarly praised "Both of You, Dance Like You Want to Win!" for its light tones and its "classic shōnen mecha charm".

According to Gualtiero Cannarsi, the synchronized combat of Asuka and Shinji was virtually reproduced in the video game Rival Schools: United by Fate. Official merchandise based on the episode has also been released, including T-shirts and action figures.
