= Asuka Strikes! =

- Neon Genesis Evangelion episode
- Evangelion Unit-02 (left) and Gaghiel during a battle. "Asuka Strikes!" received positive comments by critics, who praised action elements and the fight against Gaghiel.
- Episode no.: Episode 8
- Directed by: Kazuya Tsurumaki
- Written by: Hideaki Anno, Yōji Enokido
- Original air date: November 22, 1995
- Running time: 22 minutes

Episode chronology
← Previous "A Human Work"	Next → "Both of You, Dance Like You Want to Win!"

"Asuka Strikes", also known by the Japanese title "Asuka Arrives in Japan" (Note: Japanese: アスカ、来日, Hepburn: Asuka, rainichi) is the eighth episode of the Japanese anime television series Neon Genesis Evangelion, which was created by animation studio Gainax. The episode, written by Hideaki Anno and Yōji Enokido and directed by Kazuya Tsurumaki, was first broadcast on TV Tokyo on November 22, 1995. The series is set fifteen years after a worldwide cataclysm and is mostly set in the futuristic, fortified city of Tokyo-3. The series' protagonist is Shinji Ikari, a teenage boy who is recruited by his father Gendo to the organization Nerv to pilot a gigantic biomechanical mecha named Evangelion into combat with beings called Angels. During the episode, Asuka Langley Soryu, a girl who is designated as the pilot of Evangelion Unit-02, is introduced; after the attack of Gaghiel, the sixth Angel, Asuka cooperates with Shinji aboard the Eva-02 to defeat the enemy.

Anno conceived "Asuka Strikes!" to lighten the tone of the series after the previous episodes, which were characterized by an introspective, psychological mood. Shinji Higuchi, who worked with Anno on Nadia: The Secret of Blue Water and is known for his work's humor, drew the storyboards, giving the story a comedic tone. For the installment, the show's production staff drew several real-life vehicles while incorporating cultural references to the plays of William Shakespeare and Gainax's earlier works.

The episode's first broadcast scored a 7.6% audience share on Japanese television and was well-received by audiences and critics. Reviewers appreciated the episode's humor and action, and its introduction of Asuka's character, ranking it as one of the best episodes in the series.

== Plot ==
Misato Katsuragi, captain of the special paramilitary agency Nerv, takes Shinji Ikari and his friends Toji and Kensuke on a flight to a United Nations carrier battlegroup that is transporting a giant mecha named Evangelion Unit-02 and its German-American pilot Asuka Langley Sohryu to Japan. Escorting Asuka to Japan is Misato's ex-boyfriend, Ryoji Kaji. A massive aquatic creature called Gaghiel, the sixth of a series of enemies named Angels, begins attacking the fleet. Asuka decides to fight Gaghiel using Unit-02 and she takes Shinji with her. The Angel drags Unit-02 underwater, and Misato devises a plan to kill it by lodging two sunken battleships in its mouth and then firing all of their weapons into it. The Angel is killed; some time after, Kaji delivers an embryo-like creature named Adam to Gendo, Nerv's commander, and Asuka transfers to Shinji's class.

== Production ==
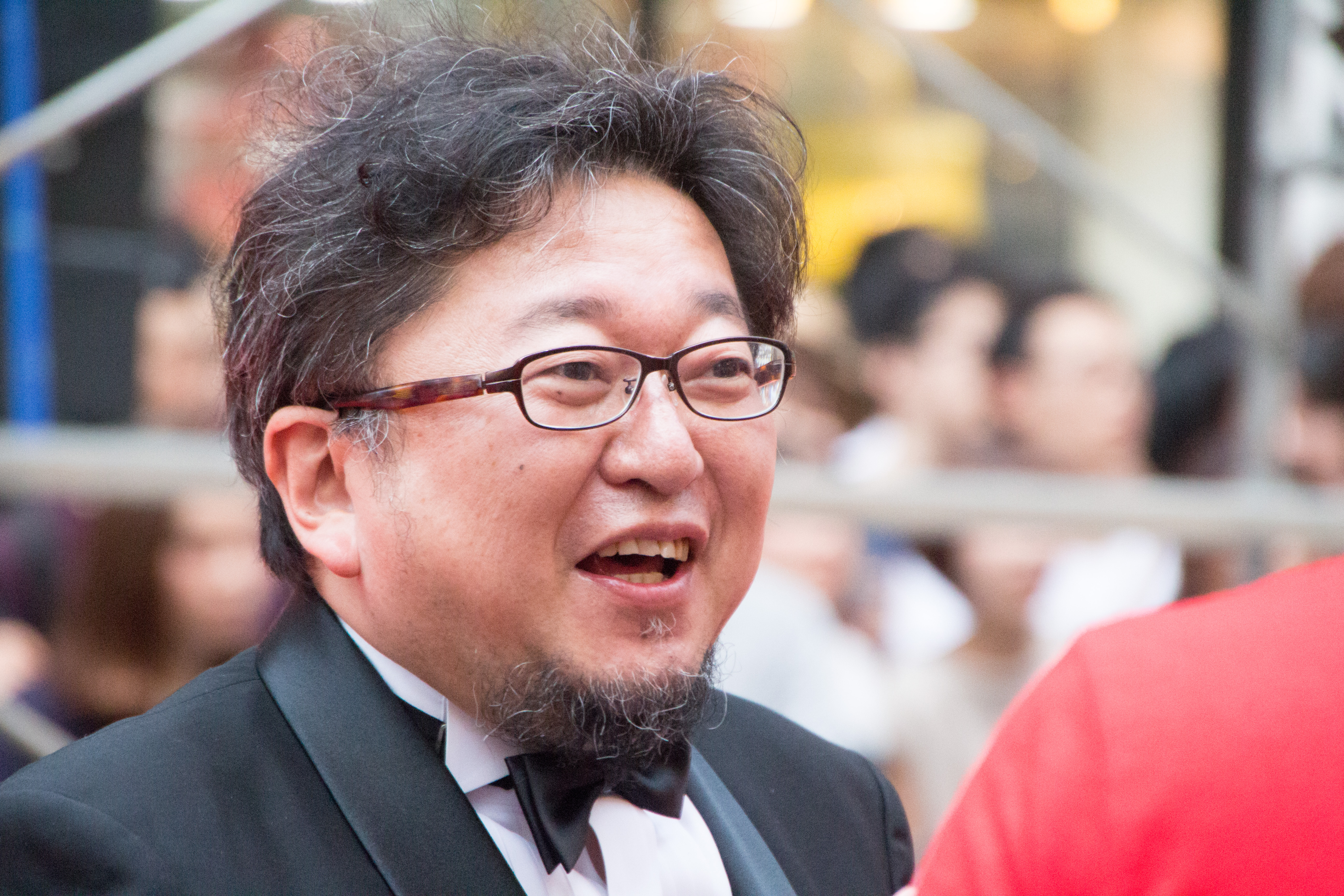
Shinji Higuchi drew the storyboard for "Asuka Strikes!"

Gainax studio decided the basic plot for "Asuka Strikes!" in 1993, when it wrote a presentation document of Neon Genesis Evangelion titled New Century Evangelion (tentative name) Proposal (新世紀エヴァンゲリオン (仮) 企画書, Shinseiki Evangelion (kari) kikakusho). The Proposal, published in 1994, describes "a battle held on the deck of an aircraft carrier" for the eighth installment of the series. Staff originally thought "Asuka's morning arrival" (アスカ、来朝) as the title for the installment at the time, which was later changed to the double title "Asuka's Arrival" (アスカ、来日) and "Asuka Strikes!". Hideaki Anno and Yōji Enokido wrote the episode. Kazuya Tsurumaki directed the installment, Shinji Higuchi drew the storyboards; Masahiko Otsuka worked as the assistant director, while Takeshi Honda served as chief animator. The animation crew also included Hidenori Matsubara, Yō Yoshinari, and Shoichi Masuo, while Mahiro Maeda and Mitsumu Wogi served as character designers. Maeda also worked on Gaghiel's design, while the series main character designer Yoshiyuki Sadamoto designed Asuka's yellow dress.

The first six episodes of the series left the staff drained and feeling weighed down by the show's heavy mood; Hideaki Anno, director of the series, consequently decided to lighten the show's tone from the seventh and eighth episodes. For the episode's central battle, the director's initial inspiration was the image of "a bright red giant standing out against a blue sky". Anno then inserted Asuka to lighten the installments, introducing her in "Asuka Strikes!" as a sunny, extroverted girl, but without thinking to re-evaluate her character much as in the final episodes of the series and without foreshadowing. The director "didn't completely grasp the character" at first, but she came to life with her recurring lines, "Are you stupid?" and "What a chance!", which were used for the first time in "Asuka Strikes!". Anno also said that he had forgotten about Rei Ayanami while writing the installment, since he did not feel particularly close to the character, so he did not include her in any sequence. Particularly important was the contribution of Higuchi, who had already worked on Nadia: The Secret of Blue Water and was known for the humorous character of his works. Higuchi infused the episode with an adolescent and comic tone, similar to his previous works. The similarities led the crew to refer to "Asuka Strikes!" and the ninth episode of Neon Genesis Evangelion as the "island arc" after the Nadia episodes of the same name. The staff also used humorous graphic symbols typical of comedy anime and manga in the episode.

Higuchi noted, unlike Gunbuster or Nadia, in which the last part of the series represents its climactic peak, Neon Genesis Evangelion has a high-intensity begin. Evangelion begins with the same intensity as the last episodes of Nadia, so the staff couldn't allow the tension to drop. He thus introduced Asuka with the idea of an eccentric and strong-willed girl who brings joy and chaos to the scene, and it was easy for him to work on her. The main conflict of the story, the introduction of the outsider Shinji to Tokyo-3, had been resolved in "Rei II", so with the arrival of a new outsider, Asuka, a new kind of confusion needed to be introduced. Anno also instructed him to portray Kaji as Masao Kusakari, who played Shunsuke Ryuzaki in the television series Pro Hunter. In the original intentions of the authors, the Angel who should have fought at sea against Unit 02 was Sachiel, an idea that was set aside and reused for Gaghiel, while Sachiel was then made to appear in the first episode. In the episode's original script draft, Gendo was meant to mention an object called the Lapis during the opening telephone conversation, although it was omitted from the final version. In her introductory scene, Asuka was to slap only Toji, and she would later have reached Eva-02 with Shinji aboard a helicopter. At the storyboard stage, Gaghiel did not have a core inside its mouth; instead, it had an exposed core that was to change color when it detected Eva-02. The battle was also originally planned to take place above water, as Eva-02 would have captured the Angel on the aircraft carrier's flight deck.

The official filmbooks of the series noted that Gaghiel's battle with the battleships is realistically impossible; according to the filmbooks, however, Gainax could have ignored the realism of the clash in an attempt to seek the viewers' catharsis. According to the original script, three battleships should have been used for the fight, but only two were used in the final version. Anno also suggested that Higuchi increase the number to four during production. The staff deliberately omitted the battle sequence from the episode's final draft; Anno then handed the script to Higuchi and explained the intended approach to the battle orally. "Asuka Strikes!" also depicts existing military vehicles, such as the Sukhoi Su-33 (or Su-27), the Yakovlev Yak-38, the Northrop Grumman EA-6B Prowler, the Northrop Grumman E-2 Hawkeye, and the Mil Mi-2, along with a Mil MI-55D, a helicopter that does not exist in the real world designed for the episode. Production staff inserted some German technical jargon terms to use during the operations, such as bewegung, nerven anschlussess, anslösung, rinkskleidung [sic]. Yūko Miyamura, Asuka's voice actress, took lessons at a language school to practice before finding out it was technical jargon; when she asked her native-German-speaking teacher for advice, he told her he did not understand it. According to writer Alexandre Marine and Anime News Network editor Callum May, staff probably did not plan to distribute the series outside of Japan, so they did not pay much attention to the correctness of the German grammar. Tomomichi Nishimura and Jin Yamanoi served as voice actors for the captain and vice-captain of the Over The Rainbow. A background radio program was also written for the episode; voice actors Nishimura, Yuriko Yamaguchi, and Kotono Mitsuishi played the characters on the program, while singer Aya sang "Fly Me To The Moon" in bossa nova style for the closing theme of the installment.

== References and themes ==
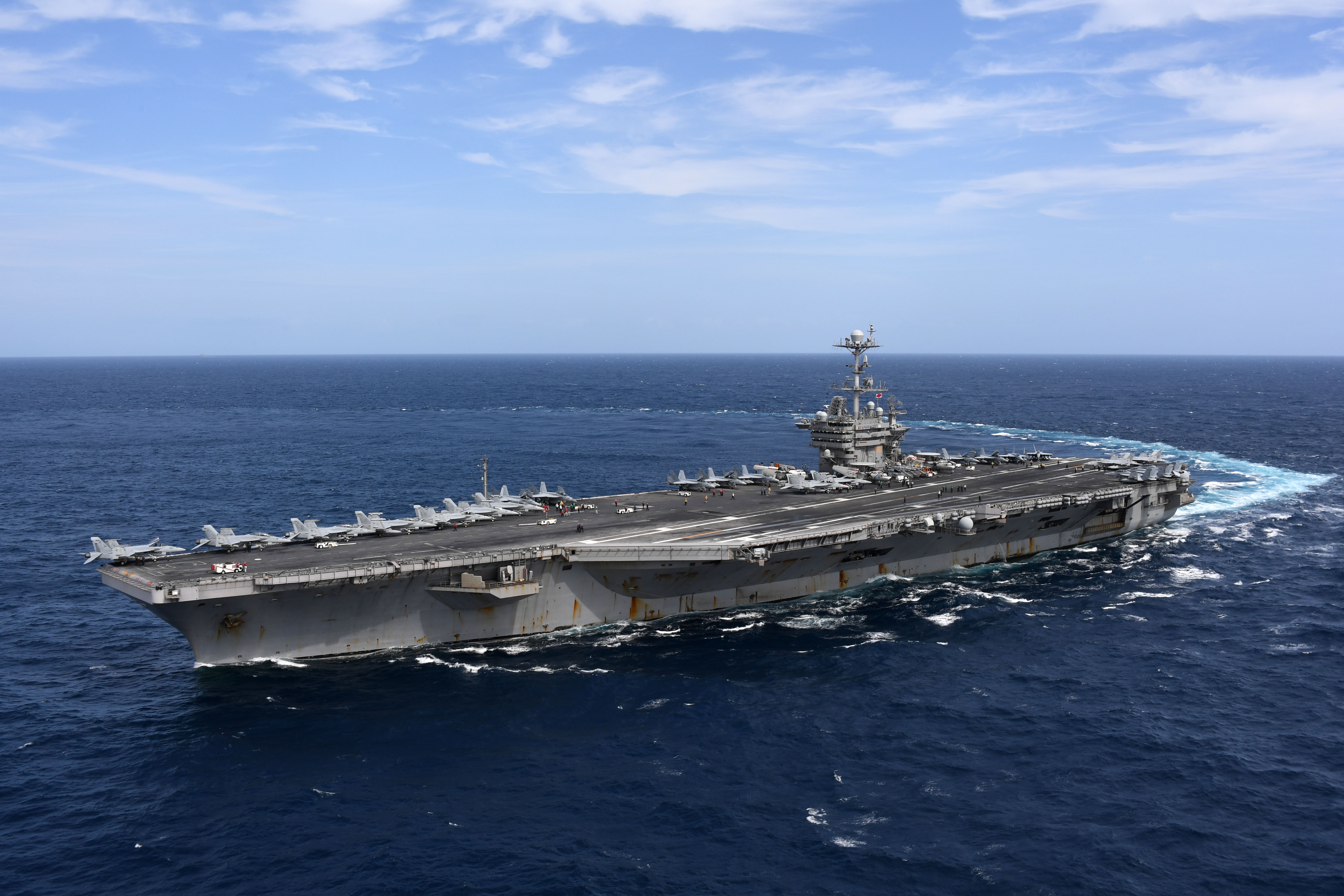
Nimitz-class aircraft carrier USS Harry S. Truman, renamed Over the Rainbow in "Asuka Strikes!"

The Nimitz-class aircraft carrier USS Harry S. Truman, renamed Over The Rainbow in homage to The Wizard of Oz song, appears in the episode, as do the Kiev-class Soviet aircraft carrier Novorossiysk, the Russian battlecruiser Kirov, the Russian destroyer Udaloy, the JS Kongō, Iowa-class battleships USS Illinois (BB-65), the USS Kentucky (BB-66), Russian aircraft carrier Admiral Kuznetsov, Arleigh Burke-class guided missile destroyer USS Ramage, USS Ticonderoga (CG-47), Tachikaze, Hatakaze, Asagiri-class destroyers and Chikugo-class destroyer escorts. Moreover, the ships' code names for internal use in the fleet — including Othello, Cymbeline, Titus Andronicus and The Tempest — are derived from titles of plays by William Shakespeare.

Kingston valves are mentioned during the battle against Gaghiel; these are special valves that are used to fill ships' hulls with water and are located at the stern of some old ships. Gainax previously mentioned the same valves in the original video animation GunBuster. At the end of the episode, Gendo describes Adam as "the first human being" in homage to a similar scene in Nadia: The Secret of Blue Water. In animator Mitsuo Iso's drafts, Adam is described as a homunculus. For writer Dennis Redmond, the admiral of Over the Rainbow also constitutes a tribute to Nadia; according to him, "Asuka Strikes!" "manage[s] to pastiche all the classic ocean adventures from Moby Dick up to Jaws".

The episode introduces the characters of Asuka and Kaji. The previous episode had already foreshadowed Kaji through a phone conversation with Gendo in the first scenes, and his first appearance portrays him as both carefree and suspicious. "Asuka Strikes!" also depicts the only battle against an Angel that doesn't take place in Japan in the whole show; all the other Angels basically aim for Tokyo-3 city, in which the Angel Lilith is kept. According to writer Virginie Nebbia, the reason why Gaghiel attacks the UN fleet is Adam's embryo inside Kaji's box. Yūichirō Oguro, editor of some of the extra content of the Japanese home video editions of the series, also noted how the series portrays the characters and their interpersonal communications in a positive light from "Asuka Strikes!" onward. In the episode, Shinji and Asuka cooperate to defeat an Angel, beginning the series' action arc, which includes all the following installments. Compared to its predecessors, the episode is characterised by great positivity, with a major focus on action and humour. According to Japanese academic Yuya Sato, from Asuka's arrival onward, Neon Genesis Evangelion features several elements of boys' manga, named shōnen, such as effort, friendship, and victory over enemies. Anime News Network's Nick Creamer similarly noted that Neon Genesis Evangelion adopts a monster of the week pattern after Asuka's debut.

For writer Álvaro Arbonés, "Asuka Strikes!" is the first episode in the series to introduce new conflicts, as Shinji and Misato clash with Asuka and Kaji, respectively, while there is still a sexual subtext in the relationship between Shinji and Misato, his mother figure, and Asuka and her fatherly figure, Kaji. In one scene, Kaji teases Misato with his foot at the dinner table, but is rejected; in retaliation, Kaji then implies that he and Misato have had a physical relationship. Kaji's allusion surprises everyone at the table, except Shinji, who doesn't catch the sexual innuendo. Asuka, on the other hand, jealous of Shinji and anxious to be the best, immediately demonstrates a rivalry towards him and makes a comment revealing her aversion to boys, considering them all perverts. According to scholar Emily Wati Muir, Shinji and Asuka "begin their relationship" in the fight scene. Asuka is rather obnoxious towards boys, especially Shinji and his macho friend Toji. Her authoritarian character emphasizes Shinji's passive attitude by contrast. Asuka's behavior is attributable to a latent inferiority complex and a "masculine protest", a psychological term coined by Alfred Adler to describe feelings present in women who are tired of the passive role typically associated with femininity, later reprised in the "Don't Be" episode. Arbonés also noted this arc has "synchronization" as its theme, as Shinji and Asuka experience a synchronization peak of a few seconds during their battle. Academic Giuseppe Gatti noted that the Evas and the children seem able to synchronize by sharing a common language and body morphology, suggesting that cognition implies possessing a body, "thus different bodies develop different cognitive processes".

== Reception ==
"Asuka Strikes!" was first broadcast on November 22, 1995, and drew a 7.6% audience share on Japanese television. In 1996, it ranked nineteenth in Animage's Anime Grand Prix list of best anime episodes. Official merchandise based on the episode has also been released, including a line of official T-shirts. The episode was received positively by critics and reviewers, who lauded its direction, plot, humor, action, and Asuka's introduction. Digitally Obsessed's reviewer Joel Cunningham praised "Asuka Strikes!", describing it as "the funniest episode in the series"; Cunningham particularly enjoyed the "hilarious" relationship between Shinji and Asuka, saying, "A great introduction of a great character, and some very amusing dialogue, make this one of the standouts of the show thus far". Film School Rejects' Max Covill ranked it among the best episodes of the series, writing, "an Asuka-centered episode is usually a great sign of quality, and this is a lot of fun"; he also praised the first scene, which portrays Asuka in shadow, for bringing a sense of mystery to the new character. Animation Planet magazine's John Beam positively reviewed "Asuka Strikes!"; he also lauded the show for its "outstanding characterizations, animations, and dramatic presentation". Protoculture Addicts similarly gave a positive review to the home video issue with "Asuka Strikes!".

Asuka provides a natural foil for the dourness of Rei and timid uncertainty of Shinji. .... Evangelion doesn't have too many light-hearted episodes. .... "Asuka Strikes!" is an exception to the rule, and it's one of the better balanced and paced episodes of the first arc. Asuka and Kaji provided much needed energy and humour, while providing some much needed backstory.

— Alex Walker (Kotaku)

Animé Café's Japanese reviewer Akio Nagatomi negatively received the episode. He criticized the introduction of Asuka and Kaji, which he said are stereotypical and cliché characters, and the introduction of Eva-02 "with a Phantom of the Opera style cloak". The reviewer was particularly critical of Asuka, the script, and the details of the plot and setting, which he said are unrealistic. Despite this, he praised the direction, saying, "the show does have flow; something to which a lot of other feature's can't lay claim". Anime News Network writer Brian Stremick reported that the introduction of Asuka led some to dislike her immediately, describing her as a "total and complete brat". Looper's Thompson Smith described Gaghiel as one of the less-interesting Angels in Neon Genesis Evangelion; according to Smith, the Angel provides a problem for Asuka to solve in her first appearance, but "lacks any sort of significance beyond all that". Comic Book Resources' Theo Kogod criticized Asuka's behavior in her first appearance; he negatively transposed the scene in which her skirt accidentally rises due to the sea breeze and slaps Toji, Kensuke and Shinji, and, since none of the boys could control the weather, Kogod considered it "an overreaction—the first of many".

The sequence in which the episode's title appears with the sound effect of Asuka's slaps received appreciation. Writers Kazuhisa Fujie and Martin Forster in their Neon Genesis Evangelion: The Unofficial Guide also said Asuka's line "Are you stupid?" has become popular since her first appearance in the eighth episode. Screen Rant's Adam Beach ranked the battle against Gaghiel among the best fights in Neon Genesis Evangelion; Beach described it as "memorable" for both Asuka's introduction and the marine setting, praising its "interesting choreography". His colleague Jack Cameron expressed a similar view, while Daniel Dockery of SyFy Wire similarly ranked the fight among the best "non-depressing moments" in Neon Genesis Evangelion. Newtype magazine praised the episode's drawings and Asuka's facial expressions. Alex Walker of Kotaku ranked "Asuka Strikes!" among the best Neon Genesis Evangelion episodes. Multiversity Comics' Matthew Garcia said the episode's treatment of Asuka in view of her team is interesting. For Anthony Gramuglia of Comic Book Resources, she is a refreshing character compared to Shinji's insecurities in the previous seven episodes, and this invigorates the series with a "great deal of joy". According to Gramuglia, "She changes the show, offering a diversity of perspective that livens things up". Crunchyroll's reviewer Noelle Ogawa similarly wrote, "From her confident introduction aboard a battleship to her forceful and aggressive battle style in her bright red Eva, she is a joy every time she's on screen". Jemima Sebastian from IGN compared a scene from Godzilla vs. Kong (2021), in which King Kong on a ship suffers an underwater attack from Godzilla, to the fight between Gaghiel and Eva-02, describing it as a possible homage to Evangelion.
