= He was aware that he was still a child =

- Neon Genesis Evangelion episodes
- Kozo Fuyutsuki and Yui Ikari with young Shinji discussing on Dead Sea Scrolls scenario. The scene comes from the extended home video version. Mechademia Mariana Ortega described Yui playing with Shinji as a "benign Madonna".
- Episode nos.: Episodes 21/21'
- Directed by: Hiroyuki Ishido (on-air version); Masahiko Otsuka, Shunji Suzuki (video format version)
- Written by: Hideaki Anno, Akio Satsukawa
- Original air date: February 21, 1996
- Running time: 22 minutes (on-air version); 28 minutes (video format version)

Episode chronology
| ← Previous "Weaving a Story 2: oral stage" | Next → "Don't Be" |

"He was aware that he was still a child" (Note: Japanese: ネルフ、誕生, Hepburn: Nerufu, tanjō; lit. 'The Birth of Nerv') is the twenty-first episode of the Japanese anime television series Neon Genesis Evangelion, which was created by animation studio Gainax. Hideaki Anno and Akio Satsukawa wrote the episode, which the animator Hiroyuki Ishido directed. The series' protagonist is Shinji Ikari, a teenage boy whose father Gendo recruited him to the special military organization Nerv to pilot a gigantic biomechanical mecha named Evangelion into combat against beings called Angels. In this episode, Kozo Fuyutsuki, the deputy commander of Nerv, is kidnapped by a secret organization called Seele, which questions him about his past and how he met Gendo. Fuyutsuki retraces his youth and his meeting with Yui Ikari, a young scientist with whom he falls in love. Ryoji Kaji, a member of Nerv, rescues Fuyutsuki and is killed by Seele.

Gainax wrote "He was aware that he was still a child" in haste due to a tight production schedule and time limitations. The episode was originally intended to focus on an event called the Dead Sea Evaporation Incident, which became the melting of Earth's southern ice cap during production. During the installment, it is revealed that one giant artificial cavity in Antarctica and one in Tokyo-3 exist, named White Moon and Black Moon, respectively, which came on Earth during the giant impact and were built by an alien species called the First Ancestral Race, a scenario later expanded in the Neon Genesis Evangelion 2 video game. After the first broadcast, Gainax released an extended version called the "video format version", with new footage. The animators Masahiko Otsuka and Shunji Suzuki directed this version.

"He was aware that he was still a child" was first broadcast on February 21, 1996, and drew a 7.7% audience share on Japanese television. The episode was generally well-received by critics because of the music, direction, voice acting, and ending; however, other reviewers complained of poor character development and a lack of clear explanations. The use of flashbacks was both praised and criticized.

== Plot ==
Scientists at a research base at the South Pole in 2000 discuss a mysterious weapon called the Spear of Longinus on its way from the Dead Sea. Gendo Ikari and Keel Lorenz, members of an expedition named the Katsuragi Group, criticize other scientists. In 2015, Ryoji Kaji, a member of the special paramilitary agency Nerv, sensing his death is near, leaves a message on someone's answering machine. At the Nerv base, the deputy commander Kozo Fuyutsuki is kidnapped. Misato Katsuragi, head of Nerv's strategy department, is detained because Kaji, her lover, is suspected of kidnapping Fuyutsuki. Fuyutsuki has been kidnapped by an esoteric organization called Seele, which is suspicious of Nerv's commander Gendo. Seele questions Fuyutsuki about Gendo, and Fuyutsuki recalls when he met the researcher Yui Ikari and Gendo, who then used his old surname Rokubungi, in 1999.

Yui and Gendo enter into a romantic relationship. Fuyutsuki falls in love with Yui and is suspicious of Gendo, who he believes is only approaching Yui due to her connection with Seele. Fuyutsuki begins investigating the Second Impact, an event that kills billions of people and was caused by a mysterious being called Adam. He also investigates an underground cavity in Antarctica called White Moon, which originated during an event called the Giant Impact, and discovers Gendo's and Seele's involvement in the event. Fuyutsuki then meets Yui and Gendo at the Artificial Evolution Institute in Hakone. He threatens Gendo with public disclosure of his discoveries but Gendo invites him into an underground cavity beneath Hakone that was constructed by a non-human entity. Inside the cavity, Fuyutsuki meets the brilliant researcher Naoko Akagi and Gendo reveals his organization, Gehirn, is working on the Evangelion project, the goal of which is to ensure humanity's future survival. Following this revelation, Fuyutsuki joins Gehirn.

In 2004, Yui dies after volunteering to be the subject of a contact experiment with a mecha called Evangelion 01. Gendo, after a period of mourning, proposes the Human Instrumentality Project to Fuyutsuki. In 2005, Naoko's daughter Ritsuko Akagi meets Misato and Kaji at Tokyo-2 University. After joining Gehirn with Misato, Ritsuko discovers that her mother and Gendo are in a romantic relationship. One day in 2010, Gendo brings a young girl named Rei Ayanami into Gehirn. Naoko, after completing the Magi supercomputers, finds Rei alone and lost in Gehirn's base; Rei starts calling Naoko an "old hag", saying it was Gendo who referred to her that way. Naoko recognizes in Rei the somatic features of Yui; she strangles and kills Rei and then commits suicide. After Naoko's death, Gehirn is restructured and renamed Nerv.

In the present, Kaji frees Fuyutsuki and is then killed by Seele. Misato is released and returns home to discover a message on her answering machine, in which Kaji says goodbye to her. Devastated over Kaji's death, Misato breaks down in tears; Shinji Ikari, her housemate, hears her but fails to give her words of comfort. Shinji acknowledges he does not know what to do and that he is still a child.

== Production ==
=== Genesis and staff ===
Neon Genesis Evangelion main director Hideaki Anno and Akio Satsukawa wrote the screenplay for "He was aware that he was still a child", while Hiroyuki Ishido directed the episode. Jun'ichi Satō wrote the episode's storyboard under the pseudonym Kiichi Hadame, with Satoshi Shigeta as the animation director. The production involved other studios besides Gainax, such as Vega Entertainment and Tatsunoko Color Center.

In 1993, Gainax wrote a document introducing its new planned series called New Century Evangelion (tentative name) Proposal (新世紀エヴァンゲリオン (仮) 企画書, Shinseiki Evangelion (kari) kikakusho), which already contained a synopsis of the episodes. In the original plan, the twentieth episode was to be titled "The Birth of Nerv". In the episode, Eva-05 would have been sent to the Nerv of Germany, and the history of Gendo, the Evas, and Nerv would have been presented. The original project for the episode included an in-depth look at an event called the Dead Sea Evaporation, which occurred fifteen years before the main events of the series. Kaji's death was planned to occur in the previous episode, "A Man's Battle". For the Dead Sea Evaporation, the series staff took inspiration from Gainax's previous work Nadia: The Secret of Blue Water; in the last episode of which the show's main antagonist becomes a salt statue, like Lot's wife in the Book of Genesis account of Sodom and Gomorrah. Adam would also be discovered in the Dead Sea, while in the final version the setting is Antarctica, keeping the idea of using Seele's Dead Sea Scrolls. The basic idea of using the Dead Sea, a highly saline body of water with no fish, as a setting was retained, representing Antarctica as a hostile environment for life, including microorganisms.

In the initial scenario, the Angels were supposed to be security devices left scattered around the world by an alien First Ancestral Race (第一始祖民族, Dai'ichi shiso minzoku), which was never mentioned in the version that aired. Gainax also wrote a draft for the twentieth episode of the series, which included a line from Misato saying: "I know the Angels aren't just weapons left behind by the First Indigenous Race" (使徒は第１先住民族の残したただの戦闘兵器ではない事は、わかっているわ). Gualtiero Cannarsi, editor of the first Italian edition of the series, compared the initial scenario proposed by Gainax to that of James P. Hogan's Giants series, itself influenced by Arthur C. Clarke's short story The Sentinel. In the initial scenario, in fact, the Angels attacking Tokyo-3 would have been Adam's divine sentinels that woke up after Adam's discovery, but Gainax later changed its plans. Writer Virginie Nebbia compared the First Ancestral Race idea and the concept of merging extraterrestrial life with the birth of the human race to Nadia, which already presented a similar scenario. Gainax later reused the idea of a First Ancestral Race for the video game Neon Genesis Evangelion 2.

=== Writing ===
In the episode's original script, the first Rei clone, who in the final version is strangled and killed by Naoko, survives and awakens in a Nerv control room. The Proposal document does not mention the Katsuragi research group with which Misato goes to Antarctica, nor Misato's past; Misato suffered and later recovered from aphasia in the final version, but it's unclear how she recovered. The original scenario also mentions a discovery of ancient ruins at a place named Arqa (アルカ, Aruka); according to the academic Taro Igarashi, Arqa ruins possibly become Nerv's base in the final script, which Fuyutsuki describes as a perfectly round cave. For Igarashi, this means the geofront is "some sort of ancient ruin" itself. The Institute for Artificial Evolution was supposed to be located in the underground geofront, home of Nerv, while in the final version, its headquarters are moved to the shores of Lake Ashi. The institute was conceived as an entity still active in 2015 that is independent of Nerv, rather than as a predecessor organization to Nerv, like Gehirn. The presentation document describes the Human Instrumentality Project as an attempt to acquire godlike power and a forbidden fruit; according to Evangelion Chronicle, an official encyclopedia on the series, this description alludes to "scientific arrogance". Instrumentality was supposed to recreate a perfect being, freeing man from original sin and curses; according to Evangelion Chronicle, the perfect being in the original scenario could relate to the character of Rei Ayanami. The Proposal document also mentions that Gendo runs the Human Instrumentality Project, but it is unclear whether the project is his idea or not in the final version. Lorenz Keel is introduced before Fuyutsuki, which shows his importance to Gainax's original scenario. Fuyutsuki's introduction page, on the other hand, is simple, and there is no mention of his past with Gendo.

The original script for the episode included a scene in which Gendo immediately realized that the Instrumentality Committee had ordered Fuyutsuki's abduction, as well as one in which Asuka questioned the Evangelion units' true nature. Another deleted sequence had Asuka and Shinji talk while Shinji relaxed inside Eva-01's cockpit. The original draft also called for a scene of Kaji standing alone, lost in thought. In Gainax's original plans, Fuyutsuki would have been thirty-five years old in the flashback scenes. The dialogue between Fuyutsuki and Seele also differed slightly, including a line in which a Seele member says, "Man must not exceed his limits". The flashbacks originally included a sequence in which Yui cradles the crying infant Shinji and tells him, "You always cry, don't you, Shin-chan? If you keep letting yourself be spoiled, it'll become a habit. You'll end up running away whenever you face difficulties". Another deleted sequence showed Ritsuko becoming so absorbed in her thoughts during an experiment that she failed to assist Rei when she encountered difficulties, inadvertently putting her life at risk. Rei would then have asked Ritsuko whether she intended to kill her. Gainax originally also planned for Kaji to be shot outdoors beneath a clear blue sky, rather than at night in front of a ventilator.

Further suggestions were made by animator and writer Mitsuo Iso. In a draft by Iso, Kaji was supposed to leave for China with Shinji's Eva-01 as an escort; however, during the trip, there would have been an enemy attack by an Angel. China was prominent in Iso's original script; Iso himself went to Shanghai between 1993 and 1994 for a project for Madhouse animation studio and saw a country full of rising buildings, imagining a Cold War between China and the United States in the future. In another draft, Kaji himself would have attempted to defeat an Angel aboard a plane, only to be shot down. During Kaji's death, depicted with just one eye, covered in blood against a clear blue sky, Shinji was supposed to be told, "Humanity doesn't matter. You decide". Kaji's death would have represented a turning point in Shinji's development. However, Iso felt that using another character's death to further Shinji's development was wrong, so he suggested making Kaji's death merely apparent, with the character reappearing in subsequent episodes. In further Iso's proposals, Gendo would meet Asuka's father, depicted as a politician and friend of Fuyutsuki, while Fuyutsuki would be an antagonist. Iso also suggested having Fuyutsuki reveal secrets to the opposition party; Gendo would then show Fuyutsuki Arqa, staging a coup d'état together.

Another proposal by Iso had Fuyutsuki as the student and Gendo as a professor; one scene would have shown Gendo behind Yui, like Tatsuya Nakadai in Tsubaki Sanjuro (1962). Iso himself suggested Kyoto as the meeting place; in this scenario, Nerv would have seemed like a unique organization to Iso, similar to a union of the animation studios Toei Animation, Studio Ghibli, and Sunrise, or a coalition between the Liberal Democratic Party, the Japan Socialist Party, and the New Party Sakigake. Iso then suggested adding the concept of Adamah, a substance common in areas important to human evolution, such as the Great Rift Valley in Africa and Qumran. Arqa itself would have been a semi-organic earth, Adamah, also called Entelechy, and a sort of mother to Rei. There would then be two Arqas: one in Japan, and the other in Antarctica, "the subterranean Antarctic kingdom previously discovered by Nazi Germany". The final part of Central Dogma would have featured a submarine and an area where things are upside down. In the final episodes, cards would have been revealed in Arqa, objects into which the original inhabitants of Arqa would have transcribed their personalities. Gendo would have made a pact with Arqa and the twelve final Angels to make Rei his wife Yui again, in an atmosphere similar to Dororo. Gendo would have tasted the forbidden fruit, as in Paradise Lost, and would have been the only one to know that killing Rei would then stop the twelve final Angels.

=== Development ===
A comparison between the "on-air" and "video format" versions

The production of "He was aware that he was still a child" and other episodes in the second half of Evangelion experienced several problems, mainly due to production schedules. Beginning with "Lilliputian Hitcher", the production ran into severe scheduling problems because of delays in episode delivery. Gainax had completed only twelve episodes by the time the series began airing after nearly two years of production, leaving the staff to produce the remaining fourteen in just six months—roughly one-third of the time they had spent on the first twelve. Due to time constraints, the version originally broadcast on TV Tokyo had poorer-quality animation than usual, and the episode's script was written in a hurry. From the twenty-first episode onward, Gainax inserted a few scenes featuring Evangelion units because there were no animators who could animate them. The main staff felt so tired that some members suggested stopping the production. The promise to give the series' viewers more fan service in post-credit previews of future episodes was abandoned, reflecting a more-violent and darker plot for the last episodes. Anno also decided to depict the members of Seele as monoliths, reflecting the progress of the series, which became increasingly abstract and introspective. Anno stated that, due to the pressure he felt during production, he immersed himself in increasingly deeper introspection.

Several scenes in the twenty-first-to-twenty-fourth episodes were redrawn after the series finished its broadcasts on TV Tokyo, and Anno tried to rework the parts that did not meet his expectations as much as possible. The changes improved the quality of the animation, and clarified some mysteries and underexplored plot points. Gainax produced both the original television broadcast of "He was aware that he was still a child." and the following three episodes, and an extended version called the video format version. or home video release version. Gainax also produced a feature-length recap film called Neon Genesis Evangelion: Death and Rebirth (1997), the first part of which, Death, is a summary of the series with unreleased scenes. The unreleased scenes from Death were used in the video format versions of the episodes, which were later released in the Japanese editions of the series, starting with the 1998 LaserDisc edition. Jun'ichi Satō returned to work on the episode, creating the storyboard for the video format version of "He was aware that he was still a child.". Masahiko Otsuka and Shunji Suzuki handled the staging, with Suzuki as the chief animator. Animator Mitsuo Iso also contributed to the scenes in the extended version.

In the video format version of "He was aware that he was still a child.", the staff added the scenes in which Fuyutsuki is working on a boat as an improvised doctor, investigates the Second Impact, meets Yui at the Artificial Evolution Laboratory, and argues with Yui about the transience of life on the shore of Lake Ashi. Sequences of scientists in Antarctica during the Second Impact were presented in Death and later merged into the video format version. The scene in which Fuyutsuki meets Yui at the Artificial Evolution Laboratory was already present in the episode's original script. Satō originally drew the scene for television airing; this was later reworked and included in the video format version. Satō did not receive precise directorial directives from Anno; for example, he did not know how the research ships sailing to the South Pole in Gendo's and Fuyutsuki's scene in Antarctica were built, so they had to tell him how to represent them. Furthermore, during the first television broadcast, fans speculated that Misato killed Kaji at the end of the episode, when he is killed by unidentified people sent by Seele instead, as confirmed by Evangelion staff. To remove ambiguity and not let viewers think the killer is Misato, Anno and Gainax edited the final sequences of the video format version.

For "He was aware that he was still a child", following the lead of previous episodes, Gainax used scenes with fake newspaper clippings, real black-and-white photographs, and sketches of characters from the series. Evangelion Chronicle said in the episode, the scenes set in 2015 use dull colors while the scenes from Fuyutsuki's past use bright colors, linking this device to Fuyutsuki remembering the scenes as a past that is not yet fully closed. The voice actress Megumi Hayashibara, who plays Rei Ayanami, also played Yui Ikari in the episode, reflecting Rei's biography, who since the Proposal document has been thought of as a clone of Yui. For the television version's closing theme, Gainax used a version of "Fly Me to the Moon" called "Normal" that was performed by Yōko Takahashi, while for the video format version an instrumental version of the song called "4 Beat" was used.

== Cultural references ==
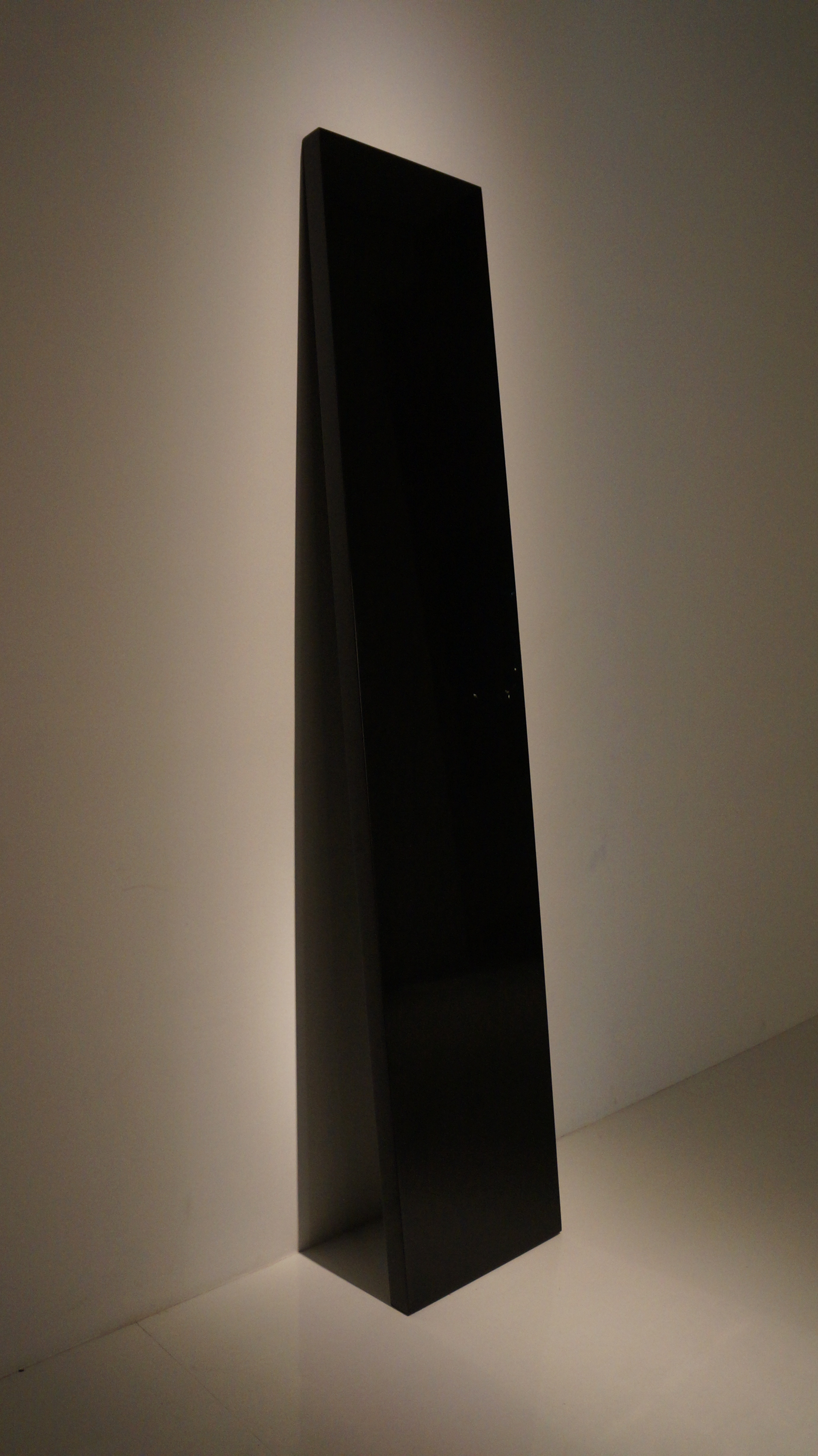
Seele's monoliths are a reference to Stanley Kubrick's 2001: A Space Odyssey monoliths (pictured)

According to the writer Dennis Redmond, the character of Naoko Akagi is modeled after William Gibson's novel Neuromancer's character Marie Tessier-Ashpool. In the scene in which Seele interrogates Fuyutsuki, the members of Steele are presented as monoliths, a reference to the monoliths in Stanley Kubrick's movie 2001: A Space Odyssey (1968) and Arthur C. Clarke's short story The Sentinel. According to Wired magazine, Neon Genesis Evangelion shares with 2001: A Space Odyssey the theme of human evolution and the discovery and investigation of a prehuman civilization "whose power men seek to harness at the cost of their survival". Seele believes humanity must evolve at all costs, which is what 2001: A Space Odyssey monoliths allow. According to the Japanese academic Yasutaka Yoshimura, the reference to the monoliths in 2001 is just one of many references in the series to 1960s design. The series staff also compared Seele to Freemasonry. Anno conceived Seele as a group of petty, irritating people who do nothing but criticize and complain until they ultimately cease to be human. Gainax had already featured similar characters in Royal Space Force: The Wings of Honnêamise (1987), Gunbuster, and Nadia.

Writer Alexandre Marine interpreted a scene in which Shinji sees Yui's experiment from a glass as a reference to a similar scene from Sailor Moon S episode "Next in Line". Animator Yūichirō Oguro, editor of the unofficial extra materials from the Japanese home-video editions of Neon Genesis Evangelion, noted that Nerv is depicted like SHADO in the installment, an organization in the British television series UFO; the episode also recalls the "Confetti Check A-O.K." episode of UFO, in which Commander Straker recalls the founding of the organization. In one scene from the episode, during Fuyutsuki's reminiscences, it is revealed that he taught metaphysical biology or metabiology at Kyoto university before the Second Impact. The name is a reference to the branch of philosophy called metaphysics, whose designation comes from a book of the same name by the Greek philosopher Aristotle. The term genome biology is also mentioned.

In the scene in which Naoko and Gendo introduce the Evangelions to Fuyutsuki, they describe Evangelion units as beings from the first Angel, Adam. The line is a reference to the Old Testament's Book of Genesis, according to which Eve was created by Adam. Adam is depicted as a giant equipped with wings of light. The writers and academics Víctor Sellés de Lucas and Manuel Hernández-Pérez have linked Adam's luminescent wings to the Christian iconography of angels. Mariana Ortega of Mechademia described the show's Adam as a "Gnostic-inspired giant of light". The writer Virginie Nebbia linked Adam's appearance to that of a giant of light that appears in the Ultraman 80 tokusatsu series, while the academic Marc MacWilliams said Evangelion's Adam is represented like "in Kabbalistic texts before his Fall". Scholar Gavin McDowell similarly noted that biblical Adam is said to have first existed in "a gigantic, luminous, quasi-divine state", which he loses at the moment of his sin. The Magi supercomputer is also mentioned. The names of the three Magi constitute a reference to the three wise men from the East mentioned in Matthew's Gospel, whom tradition indicates as Balthasar, Gaspar, and Melchior. Their names first appeared in an eighth-century religious chronicle named Excerpta Latina Barbari.

In the episode, Fuyutsuki describes 2001, the year following Second Impact, as a "hell". The writer Fabio Bartoli has linked Adam's re-enactment to the biblical Fall of man and Flood stories, and ideas about extra-terrestrial contact with pre-historic human cultures, according to which human evolution can be traced to the intervention of alien life forms. According to Bartoli, the Second Impact would have occurred as a result of an attempt by scientists to unite the biblical fruit of life with the fruit of knowledge by implanting Misato's human genes into Adam, a further reference to the Book of Genesis. As a result of the catastrophe, the waters of the South Pole turn red and are covered with columns of salt. Comic Book Resources' Theo Kogod compared the melted sea of Antarctica to the Book of Revelation, in which the sea is turned red as blood. The pillars of salt are a reference to the Bible's Sodom and Gomorrah, and the transformation of Lot's wife into a statue of salt. In the real world, it is believed Sodom and Gomorrah were located near the southern end of the Dead Sea, which is prohibitive for aquatic life due to its extremely high salinity.

In the opening scene of the video format version, the scientists of the Katsuragi expedition mention the Guf chamber, a foreshadowing of a concept that is presented more fully in "Rei III" and the 1997 film The End of Evangelion. The chamber's name is a reference to the Guf, a space in Jewish mythology where souls reside before their earthly incarnation. According to writer Kazuhisa Fujie, from the information given by Ritsuko Akagi and other scenes of the series, two Guf's cambers exist in Evangelion. One Guf's chamber was opened by Adam during Second Impact, while the other is opened by Angel Lilith during Third Impact in The End of Evangelion. McDowell noted that Guf means "body"; in the Talmudic tradition, especially in the Sefer HaBahir, Guf is identified with the body of "the primordial Adam". In the original storyboard for the movie, the term actually indicates Lilith's holes on the hand, known as stigmata. The idea for the Guf chamber came to animator Mitsuo Iso, who took inspiration from the movie The Seventh Sign (1988). Mariana Ortega linked Yui Ikari to the Sophia of Gnosticism because of "her intellectual brilliance, maternal wisdom", and status as one of the founding members of Nerv. According to Ortega, the scene showing Yui with the child Shinji on the shore of Lake Ashi depicts her as a "benign Madonna". Ortega argued that Yui transforms herself into an "all-mother", thus emphasizing the nigh-godly nature of the maternal role in Evangelion.

According to writer Dennis Redmond, in the episode "the significant clue" the geofront is not a human creation is given; the underground cavity of Nerv's future geofront is described as clearly artificial and left by "someone else". In the scene in which Fuyutsuki investigates the Second Impact, a screenshot depicting the underground cavity at the South Pole is depicted; the cavity is referred to as the White Moon and is analogous to the Black Moon under Hakone, Nerv's future geofront. According to the screenshot, it was possibly created at the time of the Giant Impact. The Giant Impact, or First Impact, in the series is a collision between the Earth and a celestial body that would later form the Moon that occurred four billion years before the events of the series. In the video game Neon Genesis Evangelion 2, it is specified that during the Giant Impact, the Black Moon, a vessel sent by a First Ancestral Race with Lilith inside, accidentally arrived on Earth and came into conflict with Earth's original inhabitants, Adam and its progeny. The scenario is a reference to the real giant impact theory, and Virginie Nebbia has linked it to the first Ultraman series, in which the eponymous hero and his enemy Bemular arrive on Earth aboard two orbs. Writer Patrick Drazen compared the First Impact scenario with the Shinto cosmology presented in the texts of the Kojiki and Nihon shoki and the Japanese myth on the origin of the world, according to which the cosmos was born from a primordial, chaotic, egg-like soup from which light and darkness were separated. The Spear of Longinus, on the other hand, has been compared with Ame-no-Nuboko (天沼矛), the spear of the two creator kamis Izanagi and Izanami; according to the myth, the two creator deities formed the first island of the Japanese archipelago with the spear. Drazen, noting the Black Moon is placed on the Izu Peninsula, also interpreted the mythopoiesis of the series as a cosmogony according to which all human life on Earth springs from Japan, or a hi-tech version of Kojiki.

== Themes ==
"He was aware that he was still a child", which opens the last story arc of the series, focuses on exploring the characters' intimate psychology, solving some narrative mysteries, and presenting new ones. It explores the creation of the Evas, the pasts of Misato, Ritsuko, and Naoko, and the relationship between Gendo, Fuyutsuki, and Yui. According to Allen Divers of Anime News Network, the exploration of the characters and their pasts "has an outsider's feel" because it follows the recollections of many of the minor characters rather than those of a major character like Gendo Ikari. According to Divers, "there is a definite push to show that Gendo still hides more secrets than is shared here". IGN said Gendo "never receives any introspective soliloquies" unlike the other characters. Evangelion Chronicle noted there are no scenes in which Gendo and Yui are seen together, emphasizing the distance between them. The Japanese architect and academic Taro Igarashi compared Evangelion's narrative structure to that of David Lynch's series Twin Peaks, in which all segments of the narrative revolve around an absent character, Laura Palmer, and the discovery of her corpse, similar to an "empty center" in the circle of the dramatic plot. Although Evangelion has a different structure from Twin Peaks, for Igarashi its center could be Gendo but it constantly oscillates. Yui's presence and absence can be seen as the empty center of the series' narrative; in Evangelion, all traces of Yui, including her dead body and photographs, are erased and "the continuing search for this erased mother figure" is the story's driving force.

According to the Japanese critic Akio Nagatomi, "He was aware that he was still a child" marks "the beginning of the end, and something that's most common in Japanese tragedies: deaths". He noted, just as in traditional Japanese tragedy, almost all secondary characters die until only the main characters remain in the episode. Álvaro Arbonés described this story arc as "the trilogy about the past". According to Evangelion Chronicle, Nerv is portrayed as a mysterious organization that is difficult to trust in this episode, following and amplifying the trend that the anime series Mobile Suit Gundam began. In 1979, Mobile Suit Gundam proposed a scenario questioning the classic model of good and righteous characters versus bad characters. Misato's past and her aphasia after Second Impact are also explored. Animedia magazine noted that the episode does not specify how Misato recovered from aphasia. Allison Keith, the character's first English voice actress, described Misato as a woman who is trapped at a childlike level and is "defensive" because she had to quickly grow up after the Second Impact. According to scholar Álvaro Arbonés, Misato and Kaji, like other Evangelion characters, do not communicate in the episode, using sex or silence to avoid communicating with each other. Animedia magazine also noted that Kaji reveals to be animated by his personal research for internal truth.

The city of Kyoto, already mentioned in the fifteenth episode, is one of the settings of the episode. According to Takigawa, this detail differentiates Neon Genesis Evangelion from many Japanese animated series of the time, which are "Tokyo-centric". Álvaro Arbonés also identified, beyond the past, loss as the main theme of the episode, since it depicts Gendo's reaction to his wife's death. Scholar Khegan M. DelPort noted Fuyutsuki "shows himself as a tempering figure, a yin to Gendo's yang". For writer Yoshihiro Tanigawa, Fuyutsuki has a strong inclination toward puritanism, and this motivation may be the driving force behind the Project to bring humanity into a self-complete being; according to Tanigawa, Fuyutsuki and Gendo appear to be after some nirvana, the "oceanic" bliss of eternal peace. According to the Evangelion Chronicle encyclopedia, Fuyutsuki agrees to join Gehirn alongside Gendo because, as a scientist, he cannot suppress his intellectual curiosity about the Evangelions. Furthermore, in the director's cut scenes of the episode Fuyutsuki reveals that during the Second Impact all life forms disappeared from Antarctica, including microorganisms. Writers Kazuhisa Fujie and Martin Foster linked this detail to The End of Evangelion movie scenario, in which the anti-AT Field concept is mentioned during Third Impact.

"He was aware that he was still a child" portrays the Eva-01 contact experiment in which Yui dies; according to Fabio Bartoli, "She did this to allow her son to realize himself through others". Yui is portrayed as a balanced, complete person who is willing to give up her career to build a family. She can see a good side in Gendo, who she describes as a "cute person". Ortega said that, unlike the "vampiric" Naoko, who dies by suicide, Yui "ultimately acts as the force of development and engenderment", and her nature becomes the final sacrifice that allows "the 'new genesis' promised in the title to come into being". Fuyutsuki meets Yui for the first time and falls in love with her in the installment. In one scene, Fuyutsuki argues with Yui while playing with the baby Shinji, and he stares at her, looking at her thigh and part of her breast. According to the storyboard, Fuyutsuki looks at Yui with some disgust because Yui has given birth and is now vulnerable. The writer Virginie Nebbia interpreted the scene as a criticism of otaku fetishization of the female body and typical anime fan service, in which women are often victims of the male gaze. Naoko, by contrast, overreacts when the first Rei clone calls her "old"; according to scholar Sano Yasuyuki, Naoko reacts by killing her because she knows and is afraid that she is getting old.

Naoko recognizes Yui's physical traits seeing Rei for the first time and in her final scene in the episode. Animedia magazine also noted that while Naoko strangles Rei in the Death and Rebirth movie, Kaworu Nagisa's face appears in Rei's eyes. According to Nicole Veneto, writing for the website Anime Feminist, the episode suggests a discrepancy between Rei's biological age of 14 and her chronological age of 10, implying "Gendo has some control over manipulating her growth". In the opening scene of the video format version, Gendo and Lorenz Keel reflect on science and scientists, arguing they believe in themselves too much and seek truth for their self-affirmation because "discovery is joy and understanding is dominance". A weapon named the Spear of Longinus is also named. The academic Fabio Bartoli said Longinus' spear is closely related to concepts of desire and dominance in the series; the scientists in Antarctica stick the spear into Adam in the same scene, and in later episodes, Gendo describes it as an obstacle to his desires. Igarashi also noted how Neon Genesis Evangelion persistently repeats the theme of copies and cloning: for example, Eva-01's and Rei's clones replace Yui; Ritsuko takes over her mother Naoko's work, which is replaced by the three Magi computers; and both Ritsuko and her mother are Gendo's lovers, replacing Yui. Naoko is portrayed as a brilliant and successful scientist who admits she can still be "replaced" in the episode. The Japanese academic Keisuke Tada said the episode summarizes a typical pathological feature of Neon Genesis Evangelion characters, who are rewarded for their abilities but remain over-concerned with others' expectations.

== Reception ==
"He was aware that he was still a child" was first broadcast on February 21, 1996, and drew a 7.7% audience share on Japanese television. In July 2020, Comic Book Resources reported an 8.6/10 rating for the installment on IMDb, making it the sixth-highest-rated Evangelion episode. Gainax also released official merchandise based on the episode, including a line of official T-shirts.

Some reviewers, while still praising the episode, were divided on the use of flashbacks and characterization. Akio Nagatomi of The Anime Café praised the episode for its music, the performance of the voice actress Kotono Mitsuishi as Misato in the final scene, and the direction, particularly the use of flashbacks. According to Nagatomi, "the direction is very tight, and the quick cuts to various scenes are skillfully interwoven with the main storyline that the viewer receives the background information, without getting confused in timelines". Nagatomi also said Evangelion does a good job of introducing interpersonal relationships between characters, but the characterization is superficial and two-dimensional, and the show is reluctant to yield information and it does so in almost-frustrating ways. Kenneth Lee of Anime News Network criticized the use of flashbacks and lamented the lack of clear explanations of plot elements, such as Yui's death and Misato's aphasia. Max Covill of Film School Rejects also criticized the excess of information, but wrote the episode "is a fascinating look into the lives of the many supporting characters in the series pre-Nerv".

Other reviewers praised "He was aware that he was still a child". Protoculture Addicts' magazine gave a positive review of the home video releases of the episode and "Don't Be". Dennis Redmond described the scene in which Misato discovers Kaji's death as "heartbreaking". Yahoo! praised the episode and wrote, "When a show gets as confusing as Evangelion, viewers can appreciate an episode centered around explanations". Alex Walker, writing for Kotaku, ranked "He was aware that he was still a child" among the best episodes of Neon Genesis Evangelion, saying that the scenes in which Kaji talks to his killer and Misato begins to cry upon discovering his death are among the "most iconic scenes in the series". DVD Talk noted the episode's plot is sometimes difficult to follow because of the time jumps, but said it "successfully pushes the series into high gear as the finale approaches". In its review of the home video release of "He was aware that he was still a child" and the following episode "Don't Be", GameFan described the in-depth exploration of Nerv's origins as the most interesting part of the volume. Digitally Obsessed described the insights into Ritsuko, Misato, and Kaji as "intriguing (and perhaps shocking)".
