= Don't Be =

- Neon Genesis Evangelion episodes
- Rei Ayanami (bottom) and Asuka Langley Soryu (right) in the lift scene.
- Episode nos.: Episodes 22/22'
- Directed by: Akira Takamura (on-air version); Kazuya Tsurumaki (video format version)
- Written by: Hideaki Anno, Hiroshi Yamaguchi
- Original air date: 28 February 1996
- Running time: 22 minutes (on-air version); 28 minutes (video format version)

Episode chronology
← Previous "He was aware that he was still a child"	Next → "Rei III"

"Don't Be" (Note: Japanese: せめて、人間らしく, Hepburn: Semete, ningen rashiku; lit. 'Staying Human') is the twenty-second episode of the Japanese anime television series Neon Genesis Evangelion, created by animation studio Gainax. The episode was written by Hideaki Anno and Hiroshi Yamaguchi and directed by the animator Akira Takamura. In the episode, Asuka Langley Soryu, the pilot of the giant mecha Evangelion Unit-02, comes into conflict with Shinji Ikari and Rei Ayanami, her fellow pilots, due to several defeats in previous battles. The fourteenth of a series of enemies named Angels, Arael, launches a mental attack on Asuka, revealing her repressed past, marked by the suicide of her mother, Kyoko.

The original premise for "Don't Be" involved an aerial battle between the Evangelion and Arael; however, the concept was shelved due to production restrictions. The episode explores Asuka's psyche and contains several references to psychology and psychoanalysis, including reaction formation, psychological regression, repression, and masculine protest. It uses experimental directorial techniques to explore Asuka's psyche, notably using George Frideric Handel's Hallelujah Chorus. Critics have compared the Chorus' use to the direction of Stanley Kubrick and Kihachi Okamoto's Blue Christmas.

"Don't Be" was first broadcast on 28 February 1996, and drew a 7.9% audience share on Japanese television. The episode received an overall positive reception from critics, who particularly praised Asuka's exploration and psychological development. However, some critics have criticized the use of the Hallelujah Chorus and a long freeze-frame scene in which Asuka and Rei remain silent in a lift.

== Plot ==
The director's cut of the episode opens the night before the eighth episode of the series, "Asuka Strikes!". Asuka Langley Soryu, pilot of the mecha Evangelion Unit-02, and Ryoji Kaji, a member of the special agency Nerv and Asuka's legal guardian, talk while en route to Japan. Asuka attempts to seduce Kaji by showing him her breasts and saying she is an adult, but he rejects her advances. The broadcast version of the episode begins with Asuka remembering her own refusal to cry at the funeral of her mother, Kyoko Zeppelin Soryu, who died after a contact experiment with an Evangelion unit. During the flashback, Kyoko speaks to a doll she believes is Asuka while Asuka's father cheats on Kyoko with a nurse—her future stepmother. Asuka overhears a conversation between her father and the nurse in which they describe humans as God's dolls.

Sometime later, Asuka practices at the Nerv base, achieving shockingly low results with her Evangelion. Misato Katsuragi, Asuka's new guardian after Kaji's death, argues that this may be due to menarche, but Ritsuko Akagi, a doctor in Nerv's science department, argues instead that the cause is rooted in Asuka's psychology. After the drill, Asuka attempts to call Kaji, who does not answer. She sees Shinji Ikari and Rei Ayanami, her fellow pilots, engaged in conversation, and feels jealous. In the evening, Asuka has dinner with Misato and Shinji, but all three remain silent. During dinner, Asuka receives an international call from her stepmother. After the call and a bath, she feels disgusted for living in the same space as Shinji and Misato. Misato and Ritsuko discuss Asuka, who feels a strong animosity and sense of inferiority toward Shinji. Asuka and Rei, meanwhile, are left alone in the elevator. After almost one minute of silence, Rei suggests that Asuka open her heart to Eva-02. Asuka insults Rei by calling her a "doll" and slapping her.

The fifteenth in a series of mankind's enemies called Angels, Arael, appears in geostationary satellite orbit. Asuka, fearing the loss of Eva-02, and refusing her assignment to cover Rei's Eva-00, attempts to intercept the enemy with a Positron Rifle. Before Asuka can attack, Arael, via a beam of light, erodes the girl's psyche. Asuka experiences a flashback in which she rejects a stuffed monkey from her stepmother, and her real mother suggests that she commit suicide along with her. Meanwhile, Rei attempts, with her own Positron Rifle, to shoot down Arael in orbit, but she fails. Gendo Ikari, supreme commander of Nerv, orders the use of a weapon called the "Spear of Longinus". Misato and Nerv's deputy commander Kozo Fuyutsuki attempt to prevent this, but the commander refuses to stop. Eva-00 extracts the Spear from a white giant in the deepest level of Nerv headquarters and launches it into orbit, defeating Arael. Asuka is angered by her defeat, which is worsened by her hatred of Rei. Shinji tries to console Asuka, but she angrily lashes out at him, telling him that she hates everyone and would rather be dead.

== Production ==
=== Background ===
Hideaki Anno, the director and main scriptwriter of the series, wrote the script for "Don't Be" with Hiroshi Yamaguchi. Kazuya Tsurumaki drew the storyboard and worked on character design. The episode was directed by Akira Takamura, while Mau Hanabatake was the chief animator. Yō Yoshinari was the chief animator of the mecha.

In 1993 Neon Genesis Evangelion studio Gainax released a presentation document for the series called New Century Evangelion (tentative name) Proposal (新世紀エヴァンゲリオン (仮) 企画書, Shinseiki Evangelion (kari) kikakusho), containing a presentation of the series and its planned episodes, which was then published in 1994. "Don't Be" was based on the studio's original plan for the twenty-first episode, which was to be titled "At least, human". The original premise had Shinji, rather than Asuka, suffering from a mental attack. The episode would have included an underwater battle near a sunken ship and explored the past of Yui, Shinji's mother. Gainax's early concept for the Angel Arael was for it to be equipped with high-frequency swords on the tips of its twelve luminescent wings. Arael was also intended to fight the Evangelions within Earth's atmosphere, rather than just appearing in outer space, in the nineteenth episode. In the original version of the script, Asuka's memories during the mind rape sequence were instead meant to flash by like a fast-forwarded video; Gainax also planned to include, among other images, a shot of Asuka's parents having sexual intercourse. Furthermore, in a proposal put forward by animator and writer Mitsuo Iso, Asuka would have used a suicide bomb attack in combat, but would have ultimately survived.

=== Development ===
Hideaki Anno originally introduced Asuka in the eighth and ninth episodes of the series in an attempt to lighten the heavy, moody tone of the previous installments. He did not have an initial plan for the character at the time; he developed Asuka as a character through her catchphrases, such as "Are you stupid?" or "Chance!", without thinking about a future devolution of her character. According to the Japanese cultural critic Hiroki Azuma, the change was the result of a decision made by Anno during the airing of the series. During the first broadcast of Neon Genesis Evangelion on TV Tokyo, Anno began to criticize animation fans, or otaku, for being emotionally closed and excessively introverted. This prompted him to take the second half of the series in a darker direction than the first half, which was seemingly headed towards a happy ending. Asuka's character development reflects this change; initially introduced as a comedic character, she suffers heavy physical and psychological wounds in the last half of the series. Azuma has stated that Asuka's injuries broke with the conventions of classic mecha anime, in which a character like Asuka would not be hurt. Anno claimed in an interview that he wanted to go against the pleasure principle of viewers who watch Evangelion and television to see an enjoyable character and a happy Asuka.

The episode features a scene with Asuka and Rei in a lift together that uses an almost one-minute-long freeze frame, during which there is no movement apart from Asuka's occasional blinking. Scholar Susan J. Napier noted that the still frame lasts "an astonishingly long time in anime and even in television in general". According to the academic José Andrés Santiago Iglesias, "the sequence recreates the social awkwardness of being stuck in a lift with someone you simply don't want to share the room with". The tension between the two characters is created without explicit images; at the end of the scene, for example, Asuka slaps Rei, but the viewer only sees the initial image of a slap and the sound, and not the actual slap. This expedient allowed the animators to avoid drawing a scene with elaborate movements. Beginning with "Lilliputian Hitcher", the production also ran into severe scheduling problems because of delays in episode delivery. Gainax had completed only twelve episodes by the time the series began airing after nearly two years of production, leaving the staff to produce the remaining fourteen in just six months—roughly one-third of the time they had spent on the first twelve.

A comparison between the on-air (top) and the video format (bottom) versions. Note the more detailed designs in the video format version.

During Asuka's subsequent mental attack, Gainax inserted distorted kanji and handwritten German terms in quick succession, such as wahnsinnig (transl. insane), wie ärgerlich (transl. how annoying), unsauber (transl. dirty), der Verlust (transl. the loss), Doppelselbstmord begehen (transl. commit double suicide), peinlichen (transl. embarrassing), Groll (transl. resentment), Stiefmutter (transl. stepmother) and erhängte (transl. hanged). In an interview, Michael House, the only American member of Gainax and the company's official translator at the time, stated that he had inserted German terms using his basic knowledge of the language acquired in high school and a Japanese-German dictionary. The terms also include Nein (transl. no) and Tod (transl. death), which, according to the magazine Evangelion Chronicle, indicate emotions lurking in Asuka's heart, as well as menarche, a woman's first menstrual cycle. According to the writer Sellés De Lucas, these inscriptions in rapid succession challenge the viewer's attention span and drawn on cinéma vérité, "which ha[d] been often considered one of Anno's inspirations for his fractured narrative".

In the same scenes, Asuka waits for the Angel Arael with her Eva-02 in the rain. Writer Virginie Nebbia has stated that Asuka is then surrounded by a divine light without drops in the same sequence, which could be inspired by the directorial style of Akio Jissōji, who directed the tokusatsu series Ultraman. Furthermore, according to the Neon Genesis Evangelion official filmbooks, Asuka is unable to pilot the Eva-02 as she once did due to her first menstrual cycle in the episode. Anno initially planned to include more scenes about Asuka's first experience with menstruation. However, not feeling, as a man, capable of exploring such a feminine subject, he condensed everything into a single scene. In the Eva-02 ejection scene, a spark caused by rubbing against the rails used to launch the mecha is visible. In response to possible criticism from viewers that the Eva's Linear Rail System should not cause such vibrations, the Evangelion staff attempted to give realism to the sequence. On the other hand, the animators unrealistically depicted Eva-00 launching the Spear of Longinus into orbit, prioritizing the spectacle of the scene.

Hideaki Anno and storyboard artist Kazuya Tsurumaki described Evangelion production as a live performance without a clear direction; therefore, according to Tsurumaki, when working on "Don't Be" the staff did not know what would happen two episodes later. Due to production issues, and particularly time constraints due to the tight schedule approaching, "Don't Be" and other episodes of the second half of the series suffered a drastic decline in animation quality, generating discussion within the staff itself. After the episode aired, Gainax released several new scenes that added to the plot and redrew some existing scenes to improve the animation quality. Unreleased sequences were shown in the film Neon Genesis Evangelion: Death & Rebirth (1997) for the first time. These new animations were later included on the home edition of the series, starting with the first LaserDisc release in 1998. The studio distributed two versions of "Don't Be" and the other retouched episodes: one from the first airing, called the on-air version, and the extended version, called the video format version or home video version. In the extended version of "Don't Be", the staff added an opening scene of Kaji and Asuka arguing on an aircraft carrier before meeting Misato and the others in "Asuka Strikes!", the sequences in which Asuka sees Shinji and Rei on a station platform, the one in which Asuka screams in the bathroom, the one in which Eva-00 extracts the Spear from Angel Lilith and grows legs, and greatly extended Asuka's inner monologue during Arael's mental attack, including the loop sequence of Asuka repeating her lines with different voice actors. Tsurumaki drew the storyboards for the video format version, working as animation director with Takeshi Honda and Yoshiyuki Sadamoto.

=== Voice acting and music ===
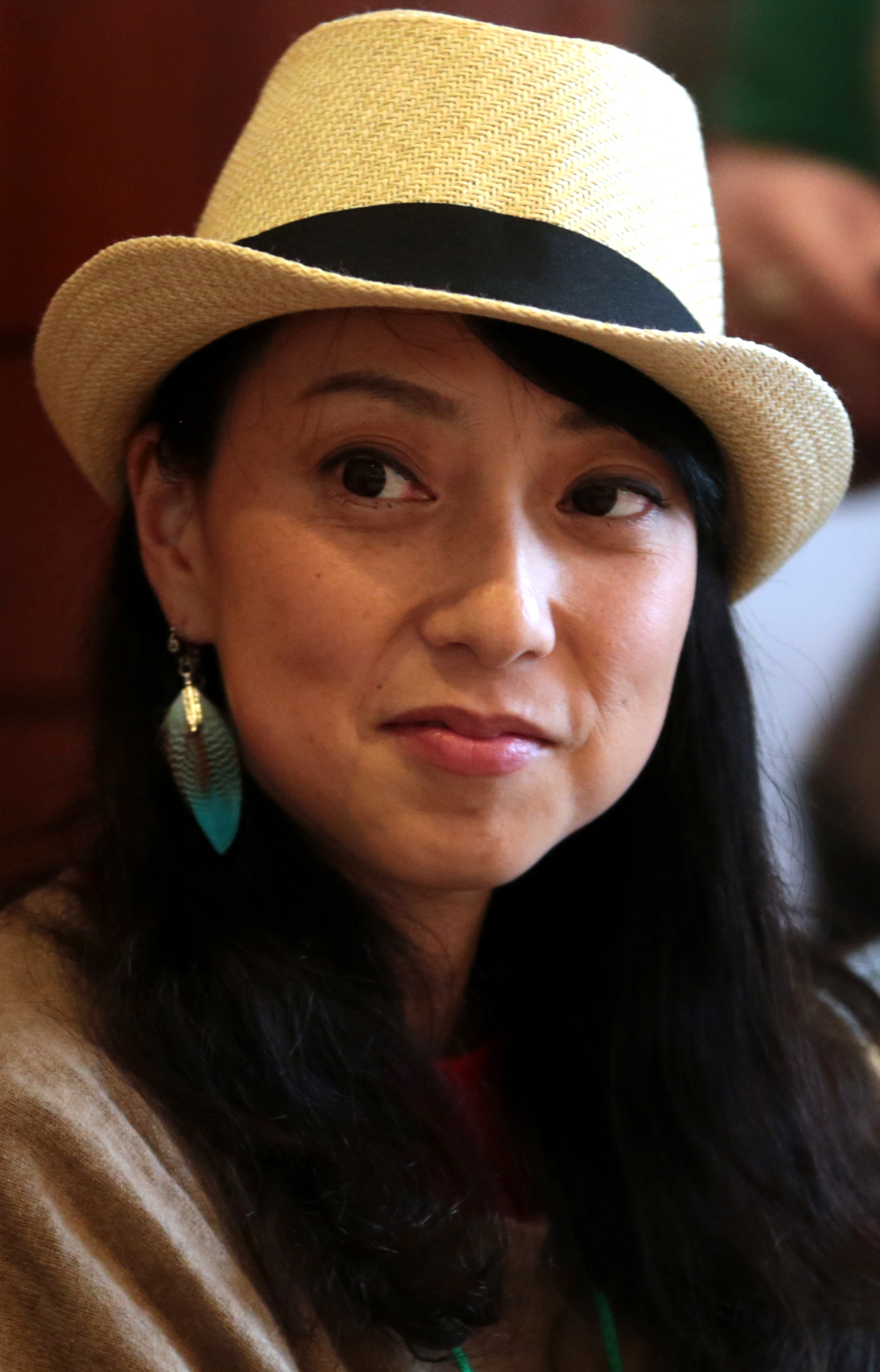
Asuka's voice actress, Yūko Miyamura

Gainax used a version of "Fly Me to the Moon" as the closing theme, performed by singer Aya, called Bossa Techno; Aya's cover is replaced by an instrumental rendition in the video format version. In addition to Shirō Sagisu's original score, the episode includes George Frideric Handel's Messiah, specifically the Hallelujah Chorus when Asuka is mentally attacked. According to an official booklet on the series soundtrack, the song's use reflects the idea that God is judging Asuka's sins. According to Virginie Nebbia, its use is relevant to the religious-spiritual theme of the series and suggests an analogy to a divine message too powerful for humans to learn, which crushes Asuka. Nebbia also noted how the same piece was used in Kihachi Okamoto's Blue Christmas. The writer Dennis Redmond compared the scene's fusion of classical music and violence to Stanley Kubrick's A Clockwork Orange.

George Frideric Handel's Hallelujah Chorus

Yūko Miyamura, who voiced Asuka, empathized greatly with her character and chose the design of the puppet in the introspective sequences. She decided on a small monkey, an animal also visible in some of her autographs. She also wrote the script of the telephone sequence between Asuka and her stepmother and took a conversational course in German to improve her pronunciation.

In the extended version of the monologue from the video format version, her mother asks Asuka who she is, and Asuka—voiced by five different actresses—repeats five times statements she had made in previous episodes. The five Asukas are voiced by Kotono Mitsuishi, Megumi Hayashibara, Miki Nagasawa, Yuriko Yamaguchi, and Junko Iwao, the voices of Misato, Rei, Maya Ibuki, Ritsuko, and Hikari Horaki, respectively. The academic Ida Kirkegaard wrote that Shinji's voice actress, Megumi Ogata, is absent among these alternate Asukas, suggesting that it is the characters, not the actresses, who are taking over Asuka's identity. For Kirkegaard, the sequence also has "a sense of wrongness" and unease that reinforces the narrative events. The replacement of Asuka's voice with that of another actress highlights the artificiality of her identity as a character and calls into question Asuka's personal identity. Kirkegaard also argued that the scene could be misinterpreted as an attempt to demonstrate to otaku the fictional nature of the characters and the world of Neon Genesis Evangelion, but "the viewer is asked to further empathize with Asuka as her reality is unraveled" instead.

== Cultural references ==
In the scene in which Evangelion units are under repair, scientific terms such as apoptosis, mitosis, necrosis, receptor, and morphogenesis are mentioned. Yahata Shoten's Evangelion Glossary (エヴァンゲリオン用語事典, Evangerion Yougo Jiten) linked the latter term to morphogenetic fields and Rupert Sheldrake's concept of morphic fields, which are energy fields with a collective memory that are located in and around systems and serve as an organising force. The concepts of visible spectrum and positrons are also mentioned in reference to Eva-00's Positron Sniper Rifle. It represents a technological evolution of Eva-01's Positron Sniper Rifle, which first appeared in the sixth episode of the series, "Rei II". In the same scene, Gendo utters the phrase "The hands of the clock cannot turn back", a reference to an earlier work by Gainax and Hideaki Anno, Gunbuster. Anno also used the Hallelujah Chorus in the same series. Eva-00 then extracts the Spear of Longinus from Lilith; its name is a reference to the Christian relic of the same name mentioned in the Gospel of Nicodemus. Writer Patrick Drazen compared Longinus' spear from Evangelion to Amenonuhoko (天沼矛), the spear of the two creator kami (deities) Izanagi and Izanami. The official filmbooks of the series noted how the shape of the spear resembles DNA. According to the scholar Fabio Bartoli, Lilith is also depicted in the guise of the Golem. During the Eva-00's descent into the deepest level of Nerv headquarters, Nerv mentions a section of structures named Malebolge; their name is a reference to the eponymous circles of Hell presented in Dante Alighieri's Divine Comedy. When Eva-00 sends the Lance into orbit, the concept of escape velocity is also mentioned.

In the opening scene of the video format version of "Don't Be", a drink called Isoroku is shown, a tribute to the Japanese admiral Isoroku Yamamoto. During the episode, Shinji wears a shirt with the inscription XTC, in homage to the British band of the same name. Virginie Nebbia compared Arael to Perolynga, an antagonist from Ultraman, and Kyoko to Kushana's mother from Hayao Miyazaki's Nausicaä of the Valley of the Wind, who also speaks to a doll believing it to be her daughter. According to Nebbia, Arael's mental attack, on the other hand, resembles Solaris, the animated ocean protagonist of Stanisław Lem's novel of the same name. Kyoko's madness is caused by a mental contamination, which the Evangelion Glossary linked to the phenomenon of a mental contagion, where one patient's symptoms are passed onto another by suggestion.

Several psychological terms appear during Arael's attack, such as primary identification, dependency, manifestation, shadow, suppression, masculine protest, and attachment behavior. In Asuka's inner monologue, the English title of the episode, "Don't Be", is visible. According to the official film-book of the series, these are words no Western parent would say to their children. Asuka rejects the doll given to her by her stepmother and attempts to abandon her childish behavior in order to become an adult; her attachment behavior consists of attempting to gain the approval of others. Furthermore, as in the concept of imprinting studied by Konrad Lorenz, Rei rarely shows emotions towards anyone other than Gendo, her primary attachment figure. The Evangelion Chronicle encyclopedia notes that Asuka performs reaction formation, another term present in the monologue, a defence mechanism consisting of replacing a feeling with its opposite; unlike a child who cries in order to gain affection, Asuka represses this desire by displaying an adult attitude. Her memories related to her past and her mother are repressed and removed from her consciousness. Asuka also demonstrates masculine protest, an aggressive and stereotypically masculine form of attitude shown by women who are tired of their feminine social role, thus competing with their male peers.

== Themes and analysis ==
"Don't Be" focuses on the psyche of Asuka Langley Soryu, exploring her troubled psychology and traumatic past. According to the writer Virginie Nebbia, Asuka, like the other protagonists of the series, hides her inner self for fear of being hurt, as in Arthur Schopenhauer's porcupine's dilemma mentioned in the third episode for the first time. At the beginning of the episode, Asuka is in a state of severe psychological crisis over her defeat in "Introjection", fearing herself surpassed by Shinji. Scholar Alba G. Torrents described Asuka as a girl obsessed with the idea of being observed by others, but who at the same time feels ashamed. The Evangelion Chronicle, an official magazine about the series, wrote that in the scene where Shinji, Misato and Asuka are having dinner, a heavy atmosphere is created through the silence and soft music in the background. Misato pretends to drink during dinner, never showing her mouth; this detail is due to a directorial choice to emphasise Misato's lack of courage in talking to Asuka about the death of her guardian Kaji, who died in the previous episode. Pen-Pen, Misato's household penguin, leaves because he cannot bear the tense atmosphere, while Shinji pays little attention to Asuka's barbed remarks. Asuka sets down her chopsticks and leaves the table without even looking at Misato. In the lift scene, however, Rei tells Asuka that without the pilot opening their souls, the Evangelions do not move, a dialogue that condenses the theme of the entire episode. The dialogue suggests that Rei understands the reason behind Asuka's breakdown. Writer Álvaro Arbonés hypothesized that Asuka's decline in synchronicity with Eva-02 was due to her growing problems with other people; Asuka, like Shinji, has a deep need for other people's recognition and was raised by an emotionally distant guardian. In this regard, Arbonés described Asuka as the opposite of Rei, who instead represents a stereotypically feminine ideal.

At the beginning of the episode, Asuka tries to seduce Kaji, but he refuses and ignores her. Scholar Katherine Savoy noted Kaji glosses over all of her attempts to make a woman out of herself, treating her more like a daughter and "casting her off as a desperate child who does not understand the nature of sexuality". For critic Vrai Kraiser, Asuka's body isn't represented as developed or adult in the way she wishes it was in the scene, so "her attempts at performing sexuality are treated neutrally by the camera". Scholar Zachary Vereb also noted Arael's light beam reflects deep into Asuka's inner psyche, "shaking her to her very core". According to writer Antony Chun-man Tam, in "Don't Be" it is revealed that Asuka "only wants to catch her psychopathic mother's attention". Scholar Gabriel F. Y. Tsang argued both Shinji and Asuka "repeatedly memorized their sudden loss of mother that leads to their nihilistic feeling and cynical attitude about existing at the present moment". Asuka suffers a mental breakdown after her buried memories resurface. At the beginning of the episode, the series also reveals that her mother, Kyoko, developed a severe mental illness following a contact experiment. Part of Kyoko's soul remained in the Evangelion unit that she made contact with. Kyoko's subsequent insanity and suicide led Mariana Ortega of Mechademia to describe her as a "vampiric" mother, just like Ritsuko's mother Naoko, who committed suicide in the previous episode. Writer Gilles Poitras compared the suicide of Kyoko, who asks Asuka to commit suicide along with her before killing herself, to the shinjū, a ritual of double suicide in Japanese culture. In another scene, Asuka is alone in the bathroom and presses her belly due to cramping, saying "Kimochi warui" (気持ち悪い), which is translated as "How disgusting", or "I feel sick". According to the AnimeNation website, Asuka's sentence shows a refusal to share her existence with Misato and Shinji; Asuka later uses the same sentence at the end of the movie The End of Evangelion (1997), where she seems disgusted by the existence of another human being, Shinji.

Arael in the form of an inner child and Asuka in the fetal position. Evangelion Chronicle magazine linked Asuka's pose to a phenomenon of psychological regression

"Don't Be" includes doll symbolism, as evidenced by a theological discussion between Asuka's father and stepmother where they describe men as God's dolls, Ritsuko's cat-shaped figurines, and the lift scene in which Rei says she is not a doll. Japanese writer Taro Igarashi has stated that Evangelion has copies and cloning as recurring themes; in "Don't Be", for example, Eva-02 replaces Kyoko, who replaces her daughter with a doll, only to later be replaced in the role of mother by Asuka's stepmother. Misato can also be considered a substitute mother figure for Asuka and Shinji; Ritsuko points out how they wanted to "play" by pretending to be a family in the same episode. Misato replies by saying that she does not intend to accept such a joke from someone like Ritsuko, who fills her loneliness with cats, before apologizing. According to the Japanese writer Hiroshi Daimon, Misato's response is an example of how characters in Neon Genesis Evangelion exhibit traits associated with borderline personality disorder. According to scholar Madeline Ashby, Asuka's accusation towards Rei of being a doll is to some extent false, since Rei frequently disobeys orders if given the chance to end her own life and "at one point she even self-destructs her Evangelion to save the other pilots, despite direct orders not to". Writer Claudio Cordella also noted that Rei is not affected by Asuka's accusations; after being slapped, Rei does not even raise a hand to her cheek.

According to Dennis Redmond, another theme of "Don't Be" is feminism. Asuka rebels against society's sexism and being treated like a doll; moreover, when Asuka is saved by Rei, Rei exhibits "the first moment of genuine rage we have ever seen". For Redmond, the moment constitutes a "savage denunciation of the unutterably vile sexism permeating so many anime series". During Arael's attack, graphics called psychographs are framed, showing the pilot's psychological state. Japanese critic Akio Nagatomi wrote that faces are visible in Asuka's psychographs. Overwhelmed by the pain, Asuka begs Arael not to penetrate her heart. According to Fabio Bartoli, the attack scene has physical as well as psychological connotations. Anime Feminist website writers similarly argued that Asuka's psychological violation presents rape imagery, calling it "mindrape". For writers Nathan Visser and Adam Barkman, Arael forces Asuka to realize that the idea of total independence "is merely a façade". At the end of her mental rape, Asuka describes herself as contaminated and curls up in a fetal pose. In the final scene of the episode, Shinji tries to console her, and Asuka is shown surrounded by a ribbon that says "Keep out". According to Evangelion Chronicle, the presence of the ribbon also reflects Shinji's cowardice, as he is incapable of crossing that line. Arbonés and the official series' filmbooks noted how Rei's saving of Asuka makes the situation even worse by hurting her pride. Animage magazine also noted how Asuka completely loses her confidence and her reason for living, becoming unable to pilot Eva-02 after this episode.

According to Virginie Nebbia, Arael's attack shows how Angels are increasingly curious about human beings and their feelings, although it is not clear whether they act out of pure instinct or through premeditation. Arael's psychological contact technique is subsequently used by two Angels, Armisael and Tabris. For Alba G. Torrents, Arael's psychic attacks scene is reminiscent of the fort-da game and the repetition compulsion, two mechanisms analyzed by psychoanalyst Sigmund Freud through which subjects attempt to master loss. The episode also reveals that the Spear of Longinus is an essential element for Seele to realize the Human Instrumentality Project, a plan to artificially evolve humanity and unite it into a single divine being. Despite Fuyutsuki's objections, Gendo uses the Spear against Arael, sending it into lunar orbit and rendering it irretrievable. For Redmond, the loss of a monopoly on the Spear constitutes "Seele's ultimate nightmare scenario". Seele is furious with Gendo after he uses the Spear against Arael, and it becomes clear that Gendo has his version of Instrumentality in mind. When Rei descends with the Eva-00 to a giant locked in Nerv, believed to be the first Angel Adam, Misato protests that doing so may set off the Third Impact, but the order cannot be overruled, and Misato is left feeling that everything she has learned is false. After the loss of the Spear, Seele changes its plans, and in The End of Evangelion uses the Eva-01 instead to realize Instrumentality. Fabio Bartoli also linked the scene in which the Spear heads towards the Moon to "Fly Me to the Moon", the series' closing theme song. According to scholar Luka Perušić, through Asuka's mental breakdown in the episode, the viewer can see what happens when the AT Field, which in the series is described as the Angels' physical barrier and the emotional barrier that holds an individual's psyche together, collapses.

== Reception ==
"Don't Be" was first broadcast on 28 February 1996 and drew a 7.9% audience share on Japanese television. Merchandise based on the episode, including a line of official T-shirts, has been released.

Digitally Obsessed's Joel Cunningham gave "Don't Be" a positive review, describing it as an "example of the unconventional goals of the series". Protoculture Addicts' magazine also gave a positive review of the home video releases with "Don't Be" and the previous episode. Film School Rejects' Max Covill positively received the episode, praising the emotional impact and the evolution of Asuka. Yahoo! website described it as "intense and disturbing" and lauded the director's cut new footage. Akio Nagatomi of The Anime Café described it as a "decent" episode and praised the use of high-speed cuts during Asuka's mind rape, but criticized Anno's use of the Hallelujah Chorus, the elevator scene, and Miyamura's performance. Kenneth Lee of Anime News Network similarly criticized the lift scene and described Anno's use of the Hallelujah Chorus as "one of the worst choices of music ever", since "sacrilegious" and incongruous. The academic José Andrés Santiago Iglesias, on the other hand, described the lift scene as one of the "examples of masterful uses of stillness" in the series. Academic Giuseppe Gatti noted the lift scene and similar still frames in the series have "become cult in the fan community".

The Japanese writer Shoko Fukuya reported that Asuka's extended inner monologue in Death and Rebirth gained a negative reaction from viewers due to the loop of Asuka repeating the same lines. GameRant described Arael's attack and Asuka's mind rape as one of the most disturbing events in Evangelion. Screen Rant similarly described it as "one of the most traumatic" battles in the series, ranking "Don't Be" among the best episodes in the series for the same reason. According to Fangoria, "It's a harrowing example of pure psychological terror". Anime News Network's James Beckett similarly lauded it, saying: "When Asuka's mind and soul were invaded by Arael in Episode 22, 'Don't Be', I learned the ways that you could use form and technique to not just tell a story, but to break it, and in so doing allow your audience to connect with your characters on an even deeper level". Looper described Asuka's character development as one "of the strongest on the show". IGN critic Ramsey Isler also praised Asuka's characterization and past, ranking her as the thirteenth greatest anime character of all time and saying: "She's a tragic character, and a complete train wreck, but that is what makes her so compelling because we just can't help but watch this beautiful disaster unfold."

In 2015, the Japanese actress Natsuki Katō dressed as Misato Katsuragi during an announcement by the Hakuto team of a space mission to send a miniature replica of Longinus' spear to the Moon, taking inspiration from a scene in "Don't Be" in which Rei sends the spear of Longinus into Lunar orbit. According to Anime News Network's James Beckett, a scene from the fifth episode of Blue Exorcist: Shimane Illuminati Saga with Izumo Kamiki may be inspired by Asuka's inner monologue in "Don't Be".
