= Rei III =

- Neon Genesis Evangelion episodes
- Small Rei Ayanami-like figures appearing from Shinji Ikari's hand during the battle against Armisael.
- Episode nos.: Episodes 23/23'
- Directed by: Shōichi Masuo
- Written by: Hideaki Anno, Hiroshi Yamaguchi
- Original air date: 6 March 1996
- Running time: 22 minutes (on-air version); 25 minutes (video format version)

Episode chronology
← Previous "Don't Be"	Next → "The Beginning and the End, or "Knockin' on Heaven's Door""

"Rei III" (Note: Japanese: 涙, Hepburn: Namida; lit. 'Tears') is the twenty-third episode of the Japanese anime television series Neon Genesis Evangelion, created by animation studio Gainax. The episode was written by Hideaki Anno and Hiroshi Yamaguchi and directed by the animator Shōichi Masuo. In the episode, Rei Ayanami, the pilot of the giant mecha Evangelion Unit-00, is attacked by the sixteenth in a series of enemies of mankind called Angels, Armisael, and decides to commit suicide to defeat the enemy. Following her death, her fellow pilot Shinji Ikari and Misato Katsuragi, head of the strategy department of the military agency Nerv, discover that Rei is a series of replaceable clones thanks to Dr. Ritsuko Akagi.

The episode is characterized by dramatic tones but also by a speed and dryness in the exposition of the series's mysteries. Critics also interpreted some imagery from the episode, including a nude scene involving Ritsuko and Rei's battle against Armisal, as sexual imagery of rape. "Rei III" contains cultural references to Christian iconography, quantum physics, the concept of death drive postulated by Sigmund Freud, and Sailor Moon, among others.

"Rei III" was first broadcast on 6 March 1996 and drew a 6.9% audience share on Japanese television. The episode received a mixed reception from critics. Some of them praised the revelations of Rei's true identity and the action scenes; other reviewers criticized Ritsuko's revelations, plus the animation quality and the voice acting.

== Plot ==
Asuka Langley Soryu, a pilot assigned to the giant mecha Evangelion Unit-02, sinks into clinical depression in the grip of an existential crisis. She leaves the home of Misato Katsuragi, her legal guardian, to go to the home of her friend Hikari Horaki, where she spends her days playing video games. Gendo Ikari, supreme commander of the special agency Nerv, is questioned by the secret sect Seele about the previous battle, in which he used a weapon called the Spear of Longinus against Seele's plans.

During Gendo's interview, the sixteenth in a series of enemies of mankind known as Angels, Armisael, is sighted. Rei Ayanami, pilot of the Evangelion Unit-00, confronts it in combat, but is violated by Armisael, who penetrates Eva-00's body and sneaks into Rei's mind in the form of another self. Shinji Ikari, Gendo's son and pilot of the Evangelion-01, goes out to rescue Rei, but is also attacked by Armisael. To kill Armisael, Rei decides to let herself explode while inside the Eva-00 with the Angel. After the fight, Misato tries to console despondent Shinji, who refuses her comfort.

Nerv warns Shinji that Rei has survived. Rei, however, proves unable to remember the fight, treating Shinji coldly and saying she is the third one. Ritsuko Akagi, head of Nerv's science department, is sent by Gendo to a Seele interrogation in place of Rei. Ritsuko, feeling betrayed, calls Shinji and Misato to explain several dark truths about the Evangelions and Rei. They descend into the depths of the Nerv headquarters, discovering that Rei is a collection of clones with a soul that is activated from time to time and can be replaced. Out of anger and resentment at Gendo, Ritsuko destroys Rei's clones before breaking down in tears.

== Production ==
=== Genesis and staff ===
In 1994, Gainax released an initial presentation for Neon Genesis Evangelion containing an initial synopsis of the twenty-third episode. In the original draft, the episode, initially titled "The Human Instrumentality Project" (人類補完計画, jinrui hokan keikaku), would have centred on a series of revelations of secrets about the Evangelions, the true intentions of Gendo Ikari and Ritsuko Akagi, and the Human Instrumentality, a project pursued by Gendo and other characters in the series to evolve humanity towards a new stage of evolution. In the following episode, "Now, the Promised Time" (今、契約時間, ima, keiyaku jikan), Rei was supposed to "break down". Her secrets would be revealed, and twelve powerful enemies called Apostolo, later called Angels, would descend from the Moon. The proposal document also specified how the Human Instrumentality was to free man from the curses and original sin that plague him, recreating a mentally and physically perfect being. According to Evangelion Chronicle, an official encyclopaedia on the series, it is unclear whether or not such a perfect being in itself corresponds to Rei; Rei is, however, created during the preparation process for Human Instrumentality in the initial scenario, although this is not explicitly stated in the final version that was later aired.

From the earliest planning stages of the series, several mysteries about the figure of Rei were planned, but their nature changed in the course of the series. In the final version, no clear explanation is given as to the nature of the Instrumentality, but the nature of Rei and the Dummy Plug is revealed nevertheless. It was originally planned to make Rei a completely alien entity, but the Evangelion staff later decided to make her at least genetically human. From the early stages, Neon Genesis Evangelion director Hideaki Anno also had the idea of presenting the death of a clone of Rei and replacing her with a new Rei. The director himself compared the idea of a reset of Rei's character to a character from the Ultraman franchise, Hideki Gō, in the series The Return of Ultraman. Hideki is portrayed as a character who seems to change at the end of each episode and become more connected to the members of his group, the Monster Attack Team, but with each new episode, his character returns to where he started. The series' assistant director, Kazuya Tsurumaki, initially opposed the idea of killing off the second Rei so late in the series. The staff of Evangelion, including Tsurumaki himself, later expressed regrets about the choice, thinking that Rei III's character was not explored as well as the other clones.

Hideaki Anno and Hiroshi Yamaguchi wrote the screenplay for the episode; Anno and Tsurumaki handled the storyboards. Shōichi Masuo took on the role of director, assisted by Masahiko Otsuka and Ken Anso. Shunji Suzuki worked as chief animator and alongside Tsurumaki as character design assistant.

=== Development ===
A scene from the video format version depicting an object that comes out of Eva-00 with the shapes of the Angels from the previous episodes.

"Rei III" and the last episodes of the series have considerably darker tones compared to the previous episodes. According to Japanese cultural critic Hiroki Azuma, the plot's rhythm is also much faster, condensing the narrative to the point of concentrating events that would otherwise have required multiple episodes into just a few sequences; Rei's battle, for example, lasts only a few minutes, so as to overwhelm the viewer with its speed. Yūichirō Oguro, editor of the extra material from the various home video editions of the series, similarly pointed out that despite the various tragedies that happen to the characters, the narration of the episode is dry and without excessive drama, with a cold, detached attitude. Moreover, during Ritsuko's scene in the Terminal Dogma, Ritsuko gives the viewer several pieces of information during the climax of the episode, but the information quickly follows one after the other, confusing the viewer. According to writer Emily Wati Muir, Rei's battle also has elements of several genres, fusing them. For Muir, Rei's "robotic and military appearance and its connection to religion come from the mecha genre"; however, "the romance and her sacrifice come from the sekai-kei genre", a narrative genre in which a character's emotion and action have strong consequences on the whole fictional universe.

As the setting for the battle against Armisael, Gainax chose a real place, the Ōwakudani Valley, already presented in the episode "Hedgehog's Dilemma". The authors' original plans called for the appearance of a ribbon-shaped enemy inspired by the Möbius strip, which later became the Angel Sahaquiel. According to Yoshiyuki Sadamoto, character designer of the series, the idea behind the Angel's design was to demonstrate how Evangelion's enemies could also have non-anthropomorphic forms. Due to the lack of resources, the proposal was later shelved; Sahaquiel's design was then modified and presented in the twelfth episode. The idea of the Möbius strip later partly flowed into the Angels Zeruel in "Introjection" and Armisael. The episode was originally supposed to be entitled "The Sickness Unto Hope, and" (希望に続く病、そして, Kibō ni tsuzuku yamai, soshite); the original title would have been a reference to the Japanese title of the sixteenth episode, "The sickness unto death, and then...", which in turn is a reference to the essay of the same name by the existentialist philosopher Søren Kierkegaard.

The idea for the Guf chamber came to animator and writer Mitsuo Iso, who took inspiration from Carl Schultz's movie The Seventh Sign (1988). In the original project, under the Nerv's headquarters there were ancient ruins of a place named Arqa (アルカ, Aruka). Arqa was described as Rei's mother and father; Rei, in Iso's proposals, would have been born from Arqa, and she would have physically eaten it. Arqa would have been the Moon, or something that entered the Earth with the Giant Impact; from this event, life would have arisen, a contradiction that "defies heat and the second law of thermodynamics". Furthermore, in the twenty-third episode, Gendo would have led Eva-03, the Japan Self-Defense Forces would have invaded Nerv's headquarters; Gendo would then have been shot, falling into Lake Ashino, Misato would have attempted to rebuild Nerv, and Asuka would have escaped. Rei's room would also have displayed the symbol of the Essenes in the original scenario, a secret society led by Keel who worships Adam, responsible for the Second Impact and linked to the girl and the characters of Gendo and Yui. The Essenes would have served as antagonists, intelligent but unscrupulous Third Reich-style dictators associated with pollution and similar to the Abelt Desler family from Space Battleship Yamato. The episode's original script also called for Eva-02 to remain on the battlefield during the battle against Armisael, despite failing to activate.

"Rei III" and the other episodes of the second half of the series suffered considerable production problems. Due to continuous delays and a schedule that was getting closer and closer to its conclusion, "Rei III" and the following episodes were produced in a short time, resulting in a drop in animation quality. After the conclusion of the first broadcast, therefore, Gainax remade the episodes involved from scratch, including "Rei III". Several sequences were redrawn, and completely unedited sequences were added to better connect with the ending and to clarify some unexplained plot points. The extended version of the episodes, called the video format version or home video version, differs from the on-air version in several respects; Gainax first released the new footage in the movie Neon Genesis Evangelion: Death & Rebirth (1997) and later in the 1998 Evangelion Laserdisc edition. In the video format version of "Rei III", Gainax added the scene in which Gendo and Fuyutsuki discuss the death of Rei II in front of a capsule-shaped tank. The Armisael battle scene was expanded, adding a sequence in which a pile of flesh with the shapes of the Angels from previous episodes is formed from the body of Eva-00. In the video format version of the battle from Armisael, a giant white Rei is also formed, similar to the one later visible in the movie The End of Evangelion (1997) during Human Instrumentality, while on Shinji's hand, many small Reis are formed, which also represent a visual anticipation of the series finale. In the scene where Ritsuko shows Rei's clones in the Terminal Dogma, several images of photographs and sketches are also shown in the video format version, showing the Second Impact and the events that took place during the creation of the Evangelion units. The images were removed in later home video editions, including the Renewal of Evangelion edition (2003).

The Japanese voice actors reinterpreted several scenes from scratch for the video format version. Kotono Mitsuishi, Misato Katsuragi's performer, gave a more mature setting of her character than in the television version. According to the official liner notes of the series, this change could be due to Mitsuishi's career; after Evangelion, she went from comic roles like Sailor Moon's Usagi Tsukino to more serious and mature characters, such as in Sentimental Graffiti or Crayon Shin-chan. Miki Nagasawa, voice actress of Maya Ibuki, also gave a more mature approach to her character. Megumi Hayashibara, voice actress of Rei, redubbed the scenes of Rei agonising during the battle, giving a more resolute tone for Rei compared to the emotional voice from the television version.

== Cultural references ==
The scene between Rei and Armisael references a scene from Sailor Moon SuperS

In the first scene, coffee cans of UCC Coffee are framed, a real existing brand that was already present in Gunbuster, an earlier work by Anno and the Gainax studio. In the scene where Asuka plays video games in Hikari's house, Seca games are seen instead; the brand is a reference to Sega, one of Evangelion's main financiers. In "Rei III", various scientific concepts, such as cloning, and religious concepts are mentioned as well. From the Seele dialogues, it is revealed how the attacks of the Angels were prophesized in ancient documents called the Secret Dead Sea Scrolls, which are named after real ancient scrolls discovered in 1947 in Qumran. It was rumoured that parts of the scrolls were hidden by the Vatican because of inconvenient material that could shake the foundations of the Christian religion. Hideaki Anno incorporated the Dead Sea Scrolls into the script because he found the idea that their undisclosed contents might undermine Christianity particularly compelling. According to Anno, the Old and New Testaments contain inconsistencies and distortions, including the account of Adam's creation; he argued that the Genesis narrative had been reshaped to promote a patriarchal worldview, since Eve, as the woman, should have been created first.

Evangelion Angels' names are revealed in "Rei III", all of which can be linked to angels from ancient Judeo-Christian angelological traditions, particularly the Book of Enoch. Seele also claims that eight Evangelion units have been completed and four more remain, making a total of twelve. This number is a reference to the twelve Apostles. According to French writer Virginie Nebbia, Armisael's form is a reference to the traditional Christian iconography of angels; whereas the previous Angel, Arael, represented the luminescent wings of the Christian angels, Armisael represents the halo. A halo is also visible in the sequence in which Eva-00 transforms into a giant human figure before exploding. In the scene in which Ritsuko takes Misato and Shinji to the depths of the Nerv headquarters, a double helix-shaped lift is visible. The same double helix shape can be found in Armisael's early form, similar to the structure of DNA, and in the Spear of Longinus, a weapon mentioned by Seele used against Arael in the previous episode. The very name of Central Dogma, a section of the headquarters, comes from the molecular biology concept of the same name. When Ritsuko shows Misato and Shinji the room in which Rei was born, the words "top", "bottom", and "strangeness" are visible on the walls. The three terms come from quantum physics, referring in particular to quarks. The room also has the seven eyes of the Seele emblem on it, a symbol referring to the seven eyes of the Lamb of God from the Book of Revelation.

A few sequences later, Ritsuko also mentions the Guf Chamber, briefly mentioned in the first video format version scene of the twenty-first episode, saying that Rei's soul was the last soul to leave the Guf, which was empty during Ayanami's creation. In Jewish mysticism, the Guf is a portion of the Heavens in which the souls are supposed to inhabit before their earthly incarnation. According to a legend, when this room is empty, the world will end. For writers Kazuhisa Fujie and Martin Foster, from the information given by Ritsuko and other scenes of the series, two Guf's chambers exist in Neon Genesis Evangelion. One Guf's chamber was opened by Adam during Second Impact, while the other is opened by Lilith during Third Impact. The Guf is mentioned again in The End of Evangelion during Third Impact as "the door to the beginning and the end of life" when holes open on the body of the Angel Lilith and human souls return to where they came from; in the original storyboard for the movie, the term actually indicates Lilith's holes on the hand, known as stygmata. Scholar Gavin McDowell noted that the word Guf means "body" in Hebrew; in the Talmudic tradition, especially in the Sefer HaBahir, Guf is identified with the body of "the primordial Adam".

The introspective scene in which Rei confronts Armisael is a reference to a similar introspective sequence presented in the 151st episode of Sailor Moon SuperS, the fourth season of Sailor Moon, a series Hideaki Anno worked on as an animator. In the same sequence, a piece of the soundtrack called "Thanatos" can be heard, in reference to the Greek deity of death of the same name; according to Sigmund Freud's psychoanalytic theory, Thanatos is a violent and self-destructive drive present in all human beings. In the scene where Ritsuko destroys Rei's clones, a MessagePad on which "Destrudo Release" is written is also visible; the term destrudo refers to the destructive drive of the same name postulated by Edoardo Weiss, another exponent of Freudian psychoanalysis. In the course of the episode, a graveyard-like place is also framed with several carcasses of prototype Evangelion units that failed during their development. In the video format version, the Evas graveyard has the shape of a Jewish Tree of Life, or Tree of Sefirot. According to Nebbia and writer Alexandre Marine, this idea had already been presented by Anno in his previous TV series, Nadia: The Secret of Blue Water.

Virginie Nebbia has compared the image of the aquarium containing Rei Ayanami's various soulless clones to a scene in the manga Bio City by Daijirō Morohoshi; in Byo City, the protagonist has a vision of a collective consciousness that wants to encompass humanity, graphically represented as a multitude of women with identical faces arranged as if in a tank. Japanese academic Kaichiro Morikawa compared the aquarium in which the clones are kept to The Physical Impossibility of Death in the Mind of Someone Living artwork by Damien Hirst, which consists of a preserved tiger shark in formalin in a glass-panel display case. Academician Fabio Bartoli has linked the triad of Rei clones to the three stages of the soul postulated by the Jewish Kabbalah. Rei I represents Nephesh, the vital and biological breath; Rei II represents Ruach, the raising of man from a purely biological aspect and the distinction between good and evil; and Rei III represents Neshamah, the fruit of the connection between God and man. Furthermore, Kazuya Tsurumaki and Yoshiyuki Sadamoto in an interview linked Rei's true identity, who is revealed to be genetically human and Angel together, with Gō Nagai's Devilman protagonist Akira Fudo, a character who is also a half-demon and half-human hybrid.

== Analysis and themes ==
In the video format version, various images appear in the final scene, including a frame showing the Angel Lilith merged with Unit-01. These images have been removed in the Renewal version.

According to Anime News Network's editors Paul Fargo and Allen Divers, "Rei III" follows in the wake of the previous episodes of the series and thus belongs to a particularly dramatic and tragic story arc; in this story arc, the past and motivations of Asuka, Rei, and Ritsuko are explored and revealed in highly dramatic tones. The Japanese title, "Tears", could refer to Rei's tears, but also to those of Ritsuko, Misato facing the Eva-00 explosion, Ritsuko's grandmother for the death of her cat, or those of Asuka, who cries in front of Hikari. The episode also focuses on Ritsuko Akagi's psychological breakdown. Ritsuko is examined by Seele in one scene and remains shocked to discover that she is a substitute for Rei. After being freed, she takes her revenge on Gendo by showing Rei's secret to Shinji and destroying all her remaining clones; like her mother, Naoko, Ritsuko lets her feminine nature prevail over her professional nature as a scientist. Shinji stands petrified in front of the weeping Ritsuko, feeling pity for the woman and hating his father even more.

The nature of Evangelion units and mysteries about Neon Genesis Evangelion's plot are also explored. Destroying Rei's clones, Ritsuko explains the Second Impact, calling the first Angel Adam "God"; Ritsuko reveals that the Evangelions are human beings and that the Evas, who originally have no souls, need "recovered" human souls to work, as foreshadowed during Shinji's recovering plan in the twentieth episode. She also says that Terminal Dogma is the place where Shinji's mother died. Ritsuko therefore states that the Evas are not mere copies of Adam. In an interview, Hideaki Anno explained that the line refers to the fact that the Evas contain human souls. He also said that Ritsuko's remark reflected a specific creative philosophy; according to Anno, a work may derive from preexisting models, but, like the Evangelions, it ceases to be a mere copy once its creator breathes a soul into it. In the video format version of the episode, many images are visible during Ritsuko's monologue, including a frame showing the Angel Lilith merged with Unit-01.

Asuka, having fallen into depression and realized she is useless, never meets the gaze of other people and refuses to even look her friend Hikari in the eye. She just plays video games all the time, ignoring everyone. For writer Andrew M. Winters, Asuka's personal "sense of self and confidence are shattered". Misato, on the other hand, shows a cold attitude at the sight of the Angel Armisael, maintaining distance and feeling anger towards Nerv as she is left in the dark about its secrets. After Rei II's death, Misato enters Shinji's room and attempts to console him by holding out her hand; Shinji rejects Misato's touch, telling her to stop. According to Virginie Nebbia, Misato attempts to console Shinji sensually, offering him an adult relationship, which then connects to The End of Evangelion, in which Misato kisses Shinji. The official filmbooks on the series offer an explanation of the scene, saying: "Misato stretched out her hand to Shinji. At this time she may have intended to offer her body to comfort Shinji. However, this was merely a substitutive behaviour to assuage her loneliness". According to the Evangelion Chronicle encyclopedia, Misato is rejected by Shinji because she only tries to use him as a distraction, and Shinji "is sensitive to this kind of deception". According to Gainax's staff, Hideaki Anno, by contrast, reacted angrily when he learned that everyone interpreted the scene in a sexual way.

=== Rei's identity ===
"Rei III" represents the conclusion of a trilogy dedicated to Ayanami's character, which began with the fifth and sixth episodes, entitled "Rei I" and "Rei II". The episode focuses in particular on the true nature of Rei, who turns out to be a clone. The first Rei, introduced in a flashback from the twenty-first episode, turns out to be the first clone; the Rei who dies against Armisael is the second, and the new Rei who appears after Armisael's battle in "Rei III" is the third clone. All the clones that Ritsuko reveals are kept in the Terminal Dogma are soulless puppets; only one Rei at a time has a soul, and the soul upon the death of an active clone is then transferred to another. The book Evangelion Glossary, published by Yahata Shoten, noted how the different Rei clones differ due to different environments and experiences. According to Animedia magazine, despite the revelation about Rei's true identity, the series still leaves open questions, but several clues suggest that Rei is a clone of Yui Ikari. According to writers Kazuhisa Fujie and Martin Foster, it would explain her feelings of affection towards Shinji, a reflection of Yui's maternal love. For the series's filmbooks, this revelation also shows the reason for the name of Eva's pilots; in the original Japanese version, the pilots are called with the English term "children", keeping the plural in the case of a single subject, a foreshadowing of Ayanami's various clones. Rei is also revealed to be aware of her clone status, while Seele is not.

According to AnimeFeminist writer Nicole Veneto, Rei's nature as a clone could be the cause of her poor health; she takes several pills during the series and has a dismembered body in The End of Evangelion, unable to keep her form. According to the series' staff, she essentially embodies the consciousness of the Angels; Adam and Yui Ikari also both wished for death, just as Rei did. Hideaki Anno Schizo Evangelion, a book containing several interviews with the staff of the series, describes Rei as a representation of the concept of motherhood and as a "slave", an "oppressed life born of violence", a child who was hopelessly abused before she was even born, and a sad person "who cannot kill herself even if she wanted to". Kaichiro Morikawa, noting how Rei is presented in "Rei III" covered in bandages as in the first episodes of the series, pointed out that the bandages are a stylistic and design element, not an actual medical treatment; according to Morikawa, they do not represent Rei's psychic wounds but rather her role as a warrior. Writer Álvaro Arbonés also argued that destroying Ayanami's clones in the Dummy Plug implant, Ritsuko symbolically destroys Yui.

"Rei III" presents the theme of rebirth through the birth of the third Rei, a recurring Neon Genesis Evangelion theme. Writer Dennis Redmond, on the other hand, interpreted the cloning of Rei as a metaphor for modern capitalism; according to Redmond, "Rei III" also "turns the android and cyborg narratives of the 1980s against themselves". Academician Stevie Suan noted how Rei's soulless clones smile, something Rei in the series rarely does. According to Virginie Nebbia, the functioning of the individual minds of the clones remains a mystery, but there seems to be a backup of Rei's memory; the backup, however, is not about feelings, or perhaps only unconsciously, as evidenced by Rei's behavior in front of Gendo's glasses. Rei III sees Commander Ikari's old glasses, which Rei II has guarded in her home since the beginning of the series; Rei III tries to break them but starts to cry, revealing that it is an emotionally important object. Fabio Bartoli also noted how after Rei III's birth, the glasses reflect an increasingly intense light. The third Ayanami clone, according to director Anno, still has the memories of Rei's previous clone; the third Rei tries to metaphorically break that bond by attempting to break the glasses held by the previous Rei, who was obsessed with Gendo. Scholar Medeline Ashby argued Rei is aware of her state as a clone and she frequently disobeys orders if given the chance to end her own life. According to scholars Mio Bryce, Paul Cheung and Anna Gutierrez, Rei and Yui symbolically become one during the episode, as "the roles of mother and colleague are enacted in saving Shinji from certain death".

=== Armisael's battle and sexual imagery ===
Anime Feminist interpreted Ritsuko's nudity during her interrogation by Seele as a rape scene.

During "Rei III", the second Rei makes contact with an Angel, Armisael. Armisael's behavior, like Leliel with Shinji in "Splitting of the Breast" and Arael in the previous episode, would suggest that the Angels are curious about humans and their feelings. Arael violated Asuka's psyche in "Don't Be", while Armisael violates Rei's body in this episode. Armisael seeks first-degree contact with an Eva pilot; in the following episode, the Angel Tabris attempts first-degree contact with Shinji, but Shinji initially rejects him, as Tabris himself points out when touching Shinji's hand. For Nebbia, the form of Armisael and Arael also reflects a change in the design of the enemies; in previous episodes they were similar to the giant monsters of Japanese cinema, known as kaiju, whereas now their appearance is symbolic.

Armisael attacks Eva-00 on the basis of the knowledge gained from his predecessors, Arael and Leliel; this suggests that the Angels are interconnected and gradually acquire intelligence. The confrontation also emphasizes how the differences between Angels and humans are minimal. The official filmbooks on the series emphasized how Rei's mind feels both pain and pleasure during the fight. According to Anime Feminist writers, the battle also presents the image of rape towards Rei; the Seele's interrogation of Ritsuko, in which Ritsuko is seen naked in front of the Seele members, could also suggest that Ritsuko was raped during the interrogation. Writer Alexandre Marine similarly noted that Rei has a "sexual reaction" to Armisael's penetration. The episode's original script explicitly instructed the staff to stage the battle against Armisael "with the image of rape in mind" (強姦のイメージで, gōkan no imēji de). According to Fangoria magazine, Rei shows a stoic attitude towards the enemy, and there is an element of body horror in the battle.

Rei, unlike Asuka, argues on equal terms with an Angel, responding firmly and demonstrating great mental strength. In the deep layer of her consciousness, Rei comes to terms with her inner self and faces the deep loneliness of her heart. Rei therefore unconsciously begins to cry. According to scholar Yoshihiro Tanigawa, Rei doesn't realize her feelings of loneliness "until this dialogue with her alter ego". As in "Splitting of the Breast", in which Shinji confronts another younger Shinji, Rei confronts herself. Rei argues with Armisael, who is half-immersed in an orange liquid similar to the one leaking from the Angel Lilith, believed to be Adam, kept in the deepest layers of Nerv. Rei asks Armisael, "Who are you? An Angel? The person that we call an Angel?", thus recognizing Angels as people.

Armisael speaks to her gently, using words that come from Rei's unconscious mind. Scholar Gabriel F. Y. Tsang argued the monologue begins "with Rei's questioning of the essence of herself". Armisael approaches Rei, asking, "Won't you become one with me?", a question echoing a scene from the twentieth episode. Armisael also discusses loneliness and sadness with Rei. Once Rei is awakened, Armisael attempts to join Shinji and Eva-01. Rei realizes that Armisael's actions against Shinji are a reflection of her unconscious desire for Shinji. Rei understands that she wants to become one with Shinji and realizes the changes that have taken place throughout the series in her psyche. She thus decides to kill herself, destroying Tokyo-3 city in the process. Through her interaction with Shinji in previous episodes, Rei has acquired human emotions, a clear will, and a sense of self. By shedding tears, she also realized that she is human. Gabriel F. Y. Tsang described Rei's subsequent decision to kill herself and "her willingness to sacrifice" as an act of "personal freedom". Megumi Hayashibara, Rei's Japanese voice actress, also stated that: "When she cried, it meant the waters of the pool were coming out at last. The struggle to draw your feelings forth, the reconciliation between your surface and your death - that, I believe, is where we truly become alive, truly become human begins".

== Reception ==
"Rei III" was first broadcast on 6 March 1996 and drew a 6.9% audience share on Japanese television. In July 2020, Comic Book Resources reported an 8.6/10 rating for the installment on IMDb, making it the fifth-highest-rated Evangelion episode. Merchandise based on the episode, including a line of official T-shirts, has been released. Japanese television station TV Asahi published a ranking of the 100 most significant scenes in the history of animation; Rei's suicide scene managed to reach 53rd position. Rei's suicide reappeared in another ranking by the broadcaster, in a survey of the most touching scenes in Japanese animation, in which it achieved ninth place.

"Rei III" had a mixed reception from anime reviewers. Digitally Obsessed's Joel Cunningham gave "Rei III" a positive review for its "startling revelations" about Rei and Gendo, describing its ending as "note perfect, the best moment in the series thus far". Akio Nagatomi of The Anime Café criticized the use of recycled animation, like the launches of the Eva units or Rei's bandage as in the first episodes of the series, but still praised its "above average" direction and "a strangely captivating character" in the form of Rei. Nagatomi also praised Megumi Hayashibara for having "skillfully portrayed" Rei, but criticized Yuriko Yamaguchi's role as Ritsuko; according to him, Yamaguchi "pulls off the detached, professional persona extremely well" but described Ritsuko's broken and fragile side as "a classic (and painful) example of over-acting". Anime News Network's editor Kenneth Lee negatively received the revelations about Rei's true identity and her death as a "monumental failure in character development". According to Lee, the premise of a dummy shell character gaining a soul "could had an entire series devoted to it", but Rei's character potential is wasted. Science Fiction Weekly's Tasha Robinson, on the other hand, expressed appreciation for the character's conclusion, "whose bizarre nature finally comes clear in a typically understated Anno way that explains everything while still leaving a great deal to the imagination". Film School Rejects writer Max Covill also gave a positive review, praising it for its "spectacular visuals" and the climax's "massive payoff".

The action elements, the episode's dark tone, and revelations have been particularly praised by the critics. Screen Rant ranked "Rei III" among the best Neon Genesis Evangelion episodes, praising it for its darkness, as it "marks the beginning of the downward spiral into madness that is the series' finale". The same website also ranked Rei's battle against Armisael second among the best battles from the show. Fangoria described the whole sequence as one of the most "viscerally unpleasant" of the franchise. Yahoo similarly ranked "Rei III" among the best Evangelion episodes.
