= Mount Kammuri =

Mountain in Queen Maud Land, Antarctica

Mount Kammuri (69°13′S 39°45′E) is a mountain 340 metres (1,100 ft) high standing 1.5 nautical miles (3 km) south-southeast of Mount Chōtō in the central part of the Langhovde Hills, on the coast of Queen Maud Land, Antarctica. It was mapped from surveys and air photos by the Japanese Antarctic Research Expedition (JARE), 1957–62. The name Kammuri-yama (Kanmuri Yama), meaning "crown mountain," was given by JARE Headquarters in 1973.
