= Oyayubi Island =

Island in Antarctica

- Location within Antarctica

Geography
- Location: Antarctica
- Coordinates: 69°14′S 39°40′E

Administration
- Administered under the Antarctic Treaty System

Demographics
- Population: Uninhabited

Oyayubi Island is a narrow rock island 2.8 kilometres (1.5 nmi). It lies close off Langhovde Hills, 3.7 kilometres (2 nmi) south of Mount Choto, in eastern Lutzow-Holm Bay. Oyayubi Point is a rocky point marking the southern end of Oyayubi Island.

Both the island and the point were mapped from surveys and air photos by Japanese Antarctic Research Expedition (JARE), 1957–62. The point gives its name to the island, rather than the other way around. Oyayubi-misaki, meaning "thumb point," was named in association with Cape Nakayubi ("middle-finger point"), which lies immediately northward. The name Oyayubi-jima (thumb island) was given by JARE in association with Oyayubi Point.

== See also ==
- List of antarctic and sub-antarctic islands
