= A Human Work =

- Neon Genesis Evangelion episode
- Eva-01 (right) tries to stop Jet Alone (left). The Jet Alone affair has been described by critics as a deconstruction of the mecha genre and a political satire.
- Episode no.: Episode 7
- Directed by: Keiichi Sugiyama
- Written by: Hideaki Anno, Yōji Enokido
- Original air date: November 15, 1995
- Running time: 22 minutes

Episode chronology
← Previous "Rei II"	Next → "Asuka Strikes!"

"A Human Work", also known by the Japanese title "The Works of Man", (Note: Japanese: 人の造りしもの, Hepburn: Hito no Tsukurishimono) is the seventh episode of the Japanese anime television series Neon Genesis Evangelion, which was created by animation studio Gainax. The episode, written by Hideaki Anno and Yōji Enokido and directed by Keiichi Sugiyama, was first broadcast on TV Tokyo on November 15, 1995. The series is set fifteen years after a worldwide cataclysm named Second Impact, and is mostly set in the futuristic, fortified city of Tokyo-3. The series' protagonist is Shinji Ikari, a teenage boy who is recruited by his father Gendo to the organization Nerv to pilot a giant biomechanical mecha named Evangelion into combat with beings called Angels. In the episode, a rival organization of Nerv builds Jet Alone, a prototype giant robot with an onboard nuclear reactor as an alternative to the Evangelions. During the first public test of Jet Alone, it goes out of control and marches toward a nearby city with its reactor close to a meltdown. Shinji keeps the robot at bay in his Evangelion while Nerv's Major Misato Katsuragi gets inside Jet Alone.

"A Human Work" contains quotes from Japanese and Western directors such as Stanley Kubrick, Kihachi Okamoto, and Kunihiko Ikuhara, and cultural references to scientific and religious concepts, including apoptosis, the giant-impact hypothesis, and the Tree of the Sephiroth. The episode's first broadcast scored a 5.9% rating of audience share on Japanese television. "A Human Work" received a divided reception; some reviewers considered it to be a filler episode for the series' plot, while others appreciated the political implications and character development. The episode has been described as a deconstruction of the mecha genre and the Jet Alone affair as a parody of the stylistic features of giant robot stories.

== Plot ==
Commander Gendo Ikari, head of the special agency Nerv, talks via telephone to Ryoji Kaji, who tells Ikari he has answered the information requests with falsified data, and then asks if he should do something about "that other matter". Ikari boards an SSTO and talks with an unknown person who says the budget for building more Evangelion mechas has been approved. Meanwhile, young Evangelion pilot Shinji Ikari is embarrassed by his legal guardian Major Misato Katsuragi's sloppy behavior. Shinji is also briefed on the truth about Second Impact by Dr. Ritsuko Akagi, who tells him that the official story about a freak meteor strike is a cover-up. In reality, the catastrophe was caused by the sudden awakening of an Angel in Antarctica. It is believed that the Angels' ultimate goal is to cause Third Impact, and it is hoped that Nerv can prevent this outcome by fighting the Angels with the Evangelions. Meanwhile, Misato, who is present at Shinji's briefing, is uncharacteristically quiet and deep in thought as Ritsuko speaks.

Misato and Ritsuko attend a private company's demonstration of Jet Alone, its giant, Angel-fighting robot. During the demonstration, the robot goes out of control, and its reactor becomes critical. Because the radio command circuit has been broken, Misato decides to catch Jet Alone using Shinji's mecha, Eva-01, enter Jet Alone, and delete its programming directly with the code "Hope". Shinji catches Jet Alone, and Misato successfully boards it. The password fails to stop the reactor, and Misato attempts to manually push the control rods back into the reactor. At the last moment, the rods reinsert themselves. Misato realizes the robot was never intended to melt down and that the whole situation was a result of sabotage. Later, Ritsuko and Ikari speak in his office; she explains that their plan with Jet Alone went off with no problems, other than Misato's attempted interference, and he congratulates her on a job well done. The next morning, Shinji is upset again for Misato's behavior at home, until his school friends Toji Suzuhara and Kensuke Aida say that Misato shows him a side of her personality no one else sees because she considers him family. Shinji smiles wistfully at that thought.

== Production ==
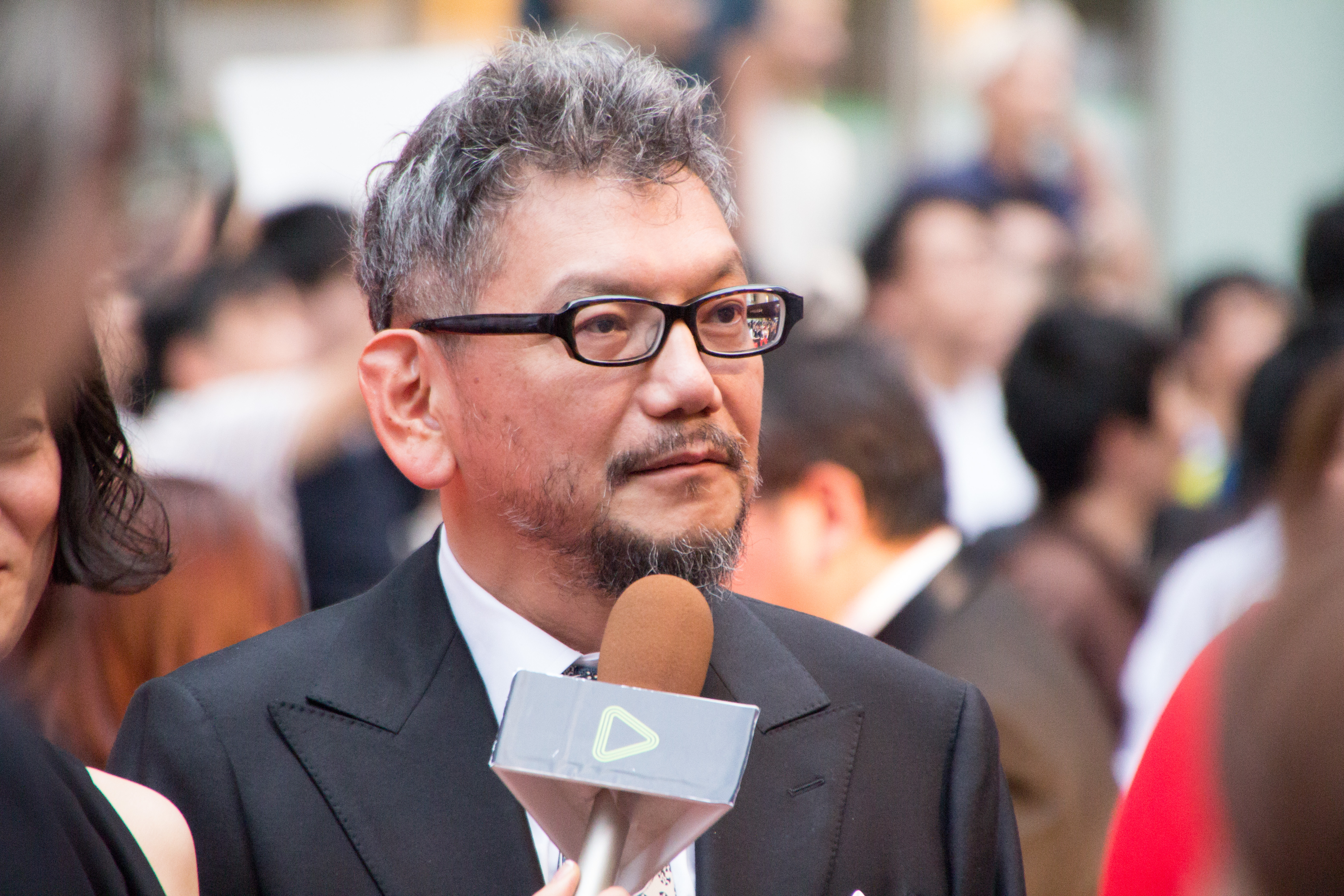
Neon Genesis Evangelion director Hideaki Anno

Gainax studio staff decided the base plot for "A Human Work" in 1993, when it wrote a presentation document of Neon Genesis Evangelion named New Century Evangelion (tentative name) Proposal (新世紀エヴァンゲリオン (仮) 企画書, Shinseiki Evangelion (kari) kikakusho), containing a first draft of the planned episodes. In the Proposal document, which was published in 1994, its Japanese title was written with a comma, as "Hito no, tsukurishimono" (人の、造りしもの; litt. "A man-made thing"). Yōji Enokido and Neon Genesis Evangelion director Hideaki Anno wrote the script for the episode; director Anno also worked on the storyboards, while Keiichi Sugiyama served as the episode's director. Masahiko Otsuka worked as assistant director, Shunji Suzuki as chief animator and Mitsumu Wogi as assistant character designer. Kōichi Yamadera, Hiro Yūki, Tetsuya Iwanaga, Tomokazu Seki, and Megumi Hayashibara, voice actors of several main characters in the series, played unidentified characters for "A Human Work", including announcers and Shinji's unnamed classmates. A four-beat Jazz version of Fly Me to the Moon sung by Japanese singer Yōko Takahashi was used as the ending theme.

In the script draft prepared before the storyboard stage, the opening scene would have shown Tokita and several other men discussing Nerv in a conference room. Shinji would also have wondered why additional Evangelions were not being built, revisiting an idea already proposed for the fifth episode, "Rei I". The name "Jet Alone" had not yet been decided, nor did the draft include the scene in which Tokita shows a photograph of Eva-01 in berserk mode or the one in which Misato nearly falls from Jet Alone. The Eva's equipment for pursuing Jet Alone was also originally designated Type B rather than Type F. Finally, the staff planned to include a scene in which, after considerable bureaucratic delay, Tokita would receive the order to suspend Jet Alone's activation after Misato had already stopped it; enraged, he would then tear up the document. For the Jet Alone dossier visible in the first scene in Gendo's office of "A Human Work", produced by the Gainax Shop, the staff recreated the original material generated with a Macintosh and modified it. Writer Virginie Nebbia likened Gendo's office to the visual style of Akio Jissōji, known as the director of various Ultraman episodes; as noted by Nebbia, Jissōji often uses shots in which the set preponderantly occupies the screen, and the characters are shot from a distance. Nebbia also noticed that Misato, usually depicted in a sensual manner, wears long pajamas that cover her entire body in "Hedgehog's Dilemma", an episode which Anno basically did not write, while in "A Human Work" Misato is represented with a neckline and shorts; Nebbia traced the origin of this fan service use to Anno's hand on the storyboards.

For the Eva transport aircraft scene, Gainax took inspiration from the American Northrop YB-49 prototype jet-powered heavy bomber, later used in the tenth episode, "Magmadiver". Its structure is similar to the real one, which was never used in war, but the Evangelion YB-49 model is over two hundred meters long. In the scene in which Eva-01 jumps from the aircraft to chase the Jet Alone, the Eva would have to stumble forward in the real world, but the staff wanted the flow to be more fluid. Anno took inspiration from tokusatsu shows for the scene, including Ultraman. The scene in which Jet Alone runs out of control against the backdrop of a sunset was animated by Takashi Hashimoto. Hashimoto did not animate the characters, working instead exclusively on the mecha and on scenes that showed the characters only from a distance. At one production meeting, he even volunteered to animate the characters as well, but the staff had already assigned those cuts to other animators. Shunji Suzuki prepared a reference animation, and Anno instructed him to make Jet Alone's arms swing as it ran. The machine's distinctive running motion, however, came entirely from Takashi Hashimoto. The staff burst into laughter during the dubbing session, and Anno expressed his satisfaction with Hashimoto's work. The shot in which Misato stands on Eva-01's palm, by contrast, was animated by Kōichi Hashimoto. The episode also contains homages to the animator Kunihiko Ikuhara, a friend of the director Anno, whose name is used for a society mentioned in the scene in which Misato and Ritsuko discuss with Shiro Tokita, and Kihachi Okamoto, of whom it takes up various directing techniques. Anime Feminist website writers noted in particular how a scene in the episode in which the characters talk in the dim light while riding an elevator resembles a recurring sequence depicting the Student Council from the subsequent anime series Revolutionary Girl Utena by Be-Papas, a production group that includes Kunihiko Ikuhara with Neon Genesis Evangelion staff members Enokido and Shinya Hasegawa. The episode also depicts real-life vehicles, such as an SSTO spacecraft and a Ferrari 328 in the scene in which Misato visits Shinji's school.

== Cultural references and themes ==
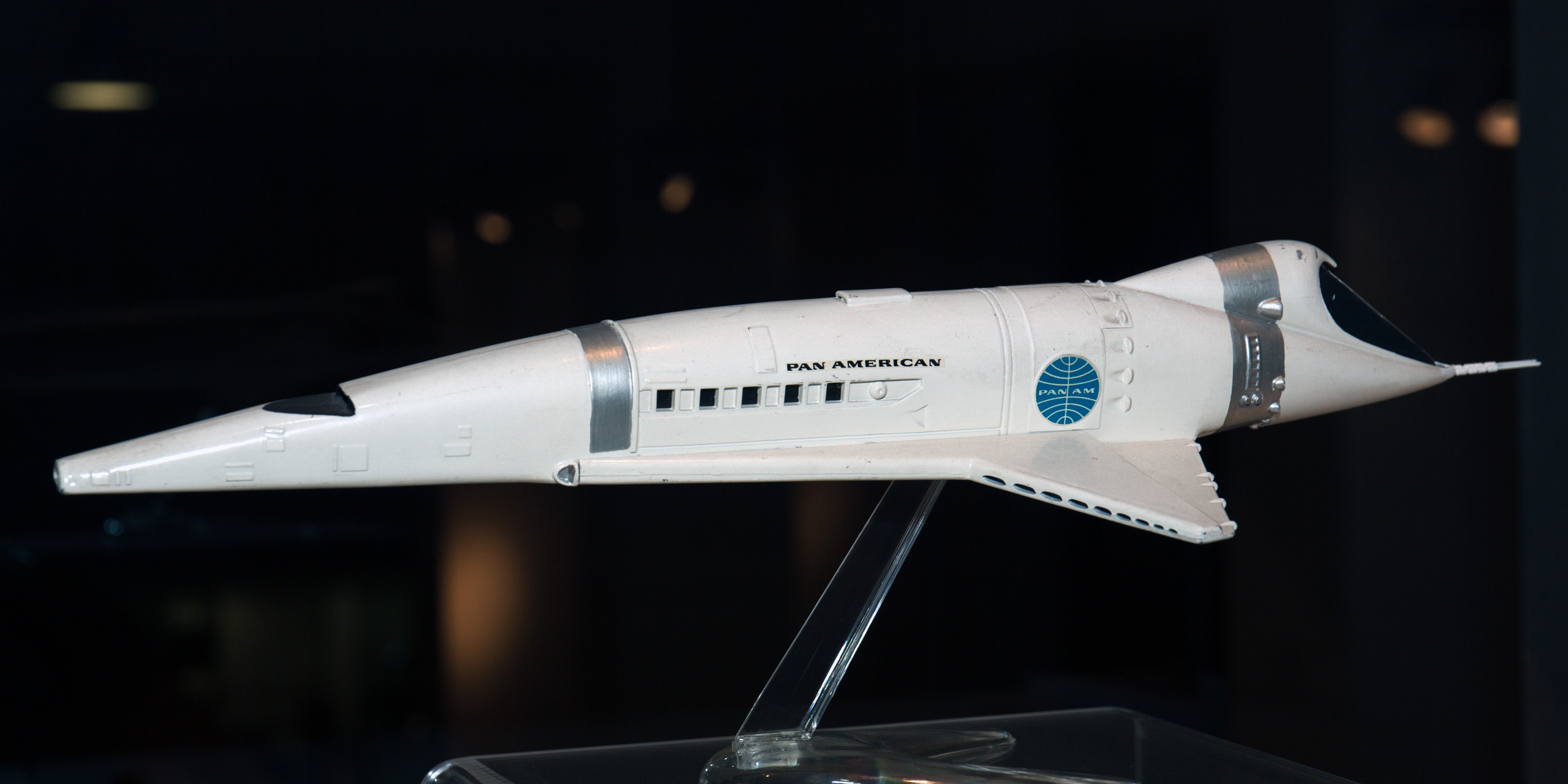
The SSTO that appears in a scene from "A Human Work" has been compared to a spaceship that appeared in 2001: A Space Odyssey.

Gendo is framed in his office in the first scene, and the Tree of the Sephiroth, a diagram of the Jewish Kabbalah, is visible on the ceiling of the room. The ceiling illustration of Commander Ikari is taken from Athanasius Kircher's Oedipus Aegyptiacus. Slant Magazine's Michael Peterson noted that Gendo's position at the desk "is in relation to the Godhead symbol on the tree". The office's floor also depicts a cosmological diagram by Robert Fludd. In the same scene, a text that mentions apoptosis and apobiosis, is framed. The text also mentions the molecular polarisation rate; according to the book Evangelion Glossary (エヴァンゲリオン用語事典, Evangerion Yougo Jiten) by Yahata Shoten, in molecular spectroscopic analysis the term indicates the polarisation ratio of incident light, such as laser or X-ray light, on a molecule of interest. The same book noted how the name of the Japanese language recognition code of the Jet Alone's operating system, KOZAIC7, is similar to Cosaic (こざいく), a software for creating Internet home pages. Moreover, Shiro Tokita's name comes from Ryū Murakami's novel Ai to gensō no fascism (愛と幻想のファシズム; "The Fascism of Love and Fantasy"). The episode also mentions other characters named after characters from the Murakami's novel: Witz, Manda, Yasugi, and Yoshizawa.

A school text by Shinji with fictitious, manipulated details on Second Impact and revelations on First Impact is framed in the episode; the informations constitute a reference to the giant-impact hypothesis. The First Impact is involved in the process of the formation of the Moon. According to official reports, the cause of the Second Impact can be traced to the crash of a meteorite on Mount Markham, detected fifteen minutes before impact by an amateur astronomer named Nan Seimoa. People are led to believe that the meteorite was ten centimeters in diameter, but with a mass close to 4.02×10^{20} tons. Dr. Ritsuko Akagi reveals that fifteen years before the events of the series humans discovered the first Angel in Antarctica instead. According to academic Fabio Bartoli, the fact that the Second Impact occurred in Antarctica and is associated with the meteorite can be linked to the ALH84001 meteorite found in the Allan Hills in 1984, in whose structures there are shapes that were initially assumed to be evidence of alien life forms. A document visible in the episode also mentions the Shinkai 6500. Japanese architect Yasutaka Yoshimura regarded SSTO's interior visible in the previous scenes as a possible reference to a spacecraft visible in the movie 2001: A Space Odyssey (1968), while Jet Alone's name comes from the robot Jet Jaguar, which appeared in the special effects film Godzilla vs. Megalon (1973) and was originally called "Red Alone". Misato tries to stop the Jet Alone "with the hands of man" in "A Human Work". Optimism and hope towards human abilities are themes already present in earlier works of Hideaki Anno, like Gunbuster and Nadia: The Secret of Blue Water.

The episode's pivotal theme is interpersonal communication. As noted by writer Álvaro Arbonés, up until the fourth episode, "Hedgehog's Dilemma", everything is filtered through Shinji's point of view; "A Human Work" and the other episodes in this narrative segment introduce the other characters' points of view instead. In "A Human Work", the relationship between Shinji and Misato is deepened. Shinji also finishes the first part of his path in the episode. In the first scenes, he addresses Misato like a younger brother, urging her not to let her friends see her half-dressed. Misato then reveals that she's going to a school teacher meeting because it's part of her job, and Shinji reacts with a somber tone, having developed a strong attachment to her; at the end of the scene, Misato speaks on the phone with the Nerv men who are watching Shinji. The installment also centers around the different aspects of Misato's psychology; she wears various masks with Shinji and shows herself to be an elder sister, a rough spinster, and a daring soldier at the same time, confusing him. Frustrated by Misato's messy private life, Shinji also says to understand why she's still single at 29 in one scene. At the end of the episode, Shinji notices Misato shows her coarser, vulnerable side because he is part of her family; after the event, the psychological distance between the two lessens. Japanese magazine Newtype noted how Shinji had a passive attitude until the Jet Alone affair, in which "he is genuinely worried about someone else for the first time". Misato's plan is based on human intuition instead, a theme that will be introduced again in the twelfth episode. Furthermore, according to writer Virginie Nebbia, "Human Work" draws a clear metanarrative parallel between Nerv and Gainax. Misato and the others complain about their salaries as they try to save the world, similar to the members of Gainax, a group of enthusiasts who have been involved in animation for years despite economic insecurity.

According to Arbonés, the episode's main theme is conspiracy, since Misato understands that someone planned the Jet Alone malfunction. The human responsibility for the Second Impact is also revealed, revealing another conspiracy. Ritsuko then claims that the Evangelions exist solely to prevent a Third Impact. Misato appears tense during Ritsuko's explanation of the Second Impact. In another scene from the episode, Gendo discusses an agreement with the United Nations to assist Nerv in building Evangelions, suggesting that the UN was a fundamental party to the arrangements with Nerv and that all nations were complicit in the war with the Angels. The series also reveals Nerv's shadow authority, Seele, as the secret council behind the activities at Nerv. According to scholar Emily Wati Muir, "A Human Work" demonstrates that authority "can be manipulated by the structures of power present within international relationships". A man argues with Gendo about a "sample" in the scene; an official encyclopedia on the series links this to the embryo of the first Angel, Adam, introduced in the following episode. According to AnimeFeminist website writer Jeremy Tauber, the conversation between Gendo and the UN representative on the SSTO references the declining Japanese economy, its military expenditures, and its budgeting, reading "something that was on the mind of Japanese economists who witnessed the nation's unemployment rate rise while America was enjoying a gradual fall in theirs". For Tauber, the fact that the Japanese Heavy Chemicals Industry lost control over Jet Alone "not only highlights the destructive consequences of capitalist competition, but also the electronics industry's failure to provide anything useful to the Japanese citizenry".

In the course of the episode, Misato and Ritsuko find themselves at a table alone surrounded by a mostly male crowd; Tokita ridicules Nerv by comparing Eva-01 to a "hysterical woman". Ritsuko does not flinch and asks Tokita pertinent and direct questions. Male attendants ignore her presumed prestige and competency, publicly mocking and ridiculing her. According to Nebbia, this is indicative of how the series portrays women as active and criticises machismo. Nebbia also compared Misato's attempt to stop the Jet Alone with David Bowman from 2001: A Space Odyssey, who tries to manually stop the artificial intelligence HAL 9000 in the film. Comic Book Resources' Matthee England described the Jet Alone affair as one of the more concentrated examples of Evangelion's deconstruction of the mecha genre. An official encyclopedia about the series also noted how the Jet Alone is the only actual robot in the whole Evangelion series. According to Álvaro Arbonés, everything in the last part of the episodes looks like a classic mecha story, but it's actually a parody. For Evangelion Chronicle, with the Jet Alone sabotage affair Nerv is portrayed as a mysterious organization that is difficult to trust, following and amplifying the trend inaugurated by the Mobile Suit Gundam anime series, which in 1979 proposed a scenario questioning the classic model of good and righteous guys versus bad guys. Critic Dennis Redmond also described it as a satire of "the arrogance of Japan's nuclear power lobby" and keiretsu business elite. Discussing Jet Alone with Shiro Tokita, Ritsuko also says that human pilots are necessary. According to scholar Gabriel F. Y. Tsang, Neon Genesis Evangelion wants to deliver an idea that "the collaboration between sincere understanding about technology and personal insistence on one's own stance can save disadvantaged Japan". For Álvaro Arbonés, the dialogue suggests the idea that "what can bend the will of the gods and do the impossible is the human heart".

== Reception ==
"A Human Work" had a mixed reception. The episode was first broadcast on November 15, 1995, and scored a 5.9% rating of audience share on Japanese TV. Protoculture Addicts gave a positive review to the home video issue with "A Human Work". Digitally Obsessed's reviewer Joel Cunningham criticized the episode as being probably the worst in the series and unnecessary; according to Cunningham, nothing happens, and events remain unchanged at the end. He described the action scenes as "well done, but ultimately frivolous" and also said, "there aren't even any particularly good character moments". Animé Café's Japanese reviewer Akio Nagatomi negatively received the episode, since it portrays governments as "simple-minded idiots", but also praised the subplots involving Misato's double face and the conspiracy that leads to the Jet Alone malfunction, the animation, and some "neat" angle shots, like the drop-shipping of the Eva from the bomber. He concluded, "Not a great episode, though the political background has me a little intrigued". According to Multiverity Comics' Matthew Garcia, "A Human Work" is not among Evangelion's best episodes, but it does manage to come together in the third act, in large part thanks to Misato.

Film School Rejects' Max Covill said "A Human Work" does not advance the series' plot "in any meaningful way", but praised the scene involving Misato and Ritsuko. He described it as "an exciting episode" that provides additional background on important supporting characters. Animation Planet magazine's John Beam positively reviewed "A Human Work" and "Asuka Strikes!", and praised the show for its "outstanding characterizations, animations, and dramatic presentation". SyFy Wire's Daniel Dockery ranked the scenes of the Jet Alone activation and Misato inside it as one of the best "non-depressing moments" in the show, describing Misato as the most underrated Neon Genesis Evangelion character and the second scene as a "tense" moment. Comic Book Resources' Devin Meenan also noted that, despite the episode seems inconsequential, "A Human Work" develops Shinji and Misato's relationship. Yahoo website similarly wrote that, despite being close to a filler episode, "A Human Work" contains a good deal of world-building detail, including the first proper explanation for the Second Impact, and it "lets Misato shine as a character".

In the second issue of the Gen:Lock webseries, a robot that is supposedly superior to gen:Lock named The Shogunate appears. Noting that a character named Anno appears in the issue, Bubble Blabber's reviewer David Kaldor regarded The Shogunate as a possible reference to the Jet Alone. The episode also inspired official merchandise, including a line of official T-shirts.

== See also ==
- Homo faber – Humankind as creator of artificial things
