= Mount Minami-heito =

Mountain in Queen Maud Land, Antarctica

Highest point
- Elevation: 480 m (1,570 ft)
- Coordinates: 69°17′S 39°48′E

Naming
- Etymology: The name "Minami-heito-zan" (south flat top mountain) was given by JARE Headquarters in 1973.

Geography
- Location: Queen Maud Land, Antarctica
- Parent range: Langhovde Hills

Mount Minami-heito (69°17′S 39°48′E) is a mountain, 480 metres (1,570 ft) high, surmounting the southeastern extremity of the Langhovde Hills, on the coast of Queen Maud Land, Antarctica. It was mapped from surveys and air photos by the Japanese Antarctic Research Expedition (JARE), 1957–62. The name "Minami-heito-zan" (south flat top mountain) was given by JARE Headquarters in 1973 and is in association with the name of Mount Heitō just northward.
