= Rei II =

- Neon Genesis Evangelion episode
- Rei Ayanami with the Moon before the beginning of Yashima Operation.
- Episode no.: Episode 6
- Directed by: Hiroyuki Ishido
- Written by: Hideaki Anno, Akio Satsukawa
- Original air date: November 8, 1995
- Running time: 22 minutes

Episode chronology
| ← Previous "Rei I" | Next → "A Human Work" |

"Rei II", also known by the Japanese title "Showdown in Tokyo-3", (Note: Japanese: 決戦、第三新東京市, Hepburn: Kessen, Daisan Shin Tokyo-shi) is the sixth episode of the anime Neon Genesis Evangelion, which was created by animation studio Gainax. "Rei II" was written by Hideaki Anno and Akio Satsukawa and directed by Hiroyuki Ishido. The series is set fifteen years after a worldwide cataclysm named Second Impact, and is mostly set in the futuristic, fortified fictional city of Tokyo-3. The episode's protagonist is teenage boy Shinji Ikari, who is recruited by his father Gendo to the organization Nerv to pilot a biomechanical mecha named Evangelion against beings called Angels. In the episode, Shinji must annihilate the fifth Angel Ramiel, who is able to destroy every enemy in its vicinity with an accelerated particle cannon. A plan called Operation Yashima is worked out, which involves Shinji shooting Ramiel from a distance with a Positron Rifle.

Production of the sixth episode took place simultaneously with the fifth, "Rei I", before the third, "A Transfer", and the fourth, "Hedgehog's Dilemma". The final scene, in which female pilot Rei Ayanami smiles at Shinji, has been described by staff and critics as the end of Evangelion's grand narrative. "Rei II" first aired on TV Tokyo on November 8, 1995, and scored a 7.7% audience share on Japanese TV. The episode was positively received by critics, who praised the interpretation of the Japanese voice actors, the deepening of the relationship between Shinji and Rei, and the realism of Operation Yashima. The Operation entered Japanese popular culture, being referenced on other shows. Merchandise based on the episode was also released.

== Plot ==
Shinji Ikari, the pilot of the giant mecha Evangelion, is attacked and damaged by Ramiel, the fifth of a series of enemies known as Angels. His Evangelion Unit-01 is recovered, and Shinji is rescued and hospitalized. The Angel then settles over the headquarters of the special agency Nerv and begins to drill the land to reach it, destroying every enemy that approaches with a particle cannon. While Shinji is recovering, Nerv's Major, Misato Katsuragi, comes up with a plan named Operation Yashima: to destroy Ramiel with a positron beam rifle, fired from outside Ramiel's attack zone. For the plan, the rifle must be able to withstand a high amount of electric energy, and it is determined that it needs power from the whole of Japan.

While the countdown for the shooting is starting, Ramiel starts to charge to attack the Evangelion and shoots toward it, simultaneously with the Evangelion's rifle's shot, resulting in the collision of the two beams and the shots miss. Ramiel charges up for a second attack, which it can fire at Shinji before he can prepare his positron rifle for a second shot. Rei Ayanami in Evangelion Unit-00 steps in and shields Unit-01 from Ramiel's beam, but both the shield and Unit-00 sustain severe damage in the process. Shinji fires his second shot, which pierces the Angel and kills it, stopping the drill. Shinji ejects Unit-00's cockpit and opens the hatch. Rei is unharmed and unfazed. Shinji cries, and Rei says she doesn't know what to feel; Shinji advises her to smile, and Rei smiles.

== Production ==
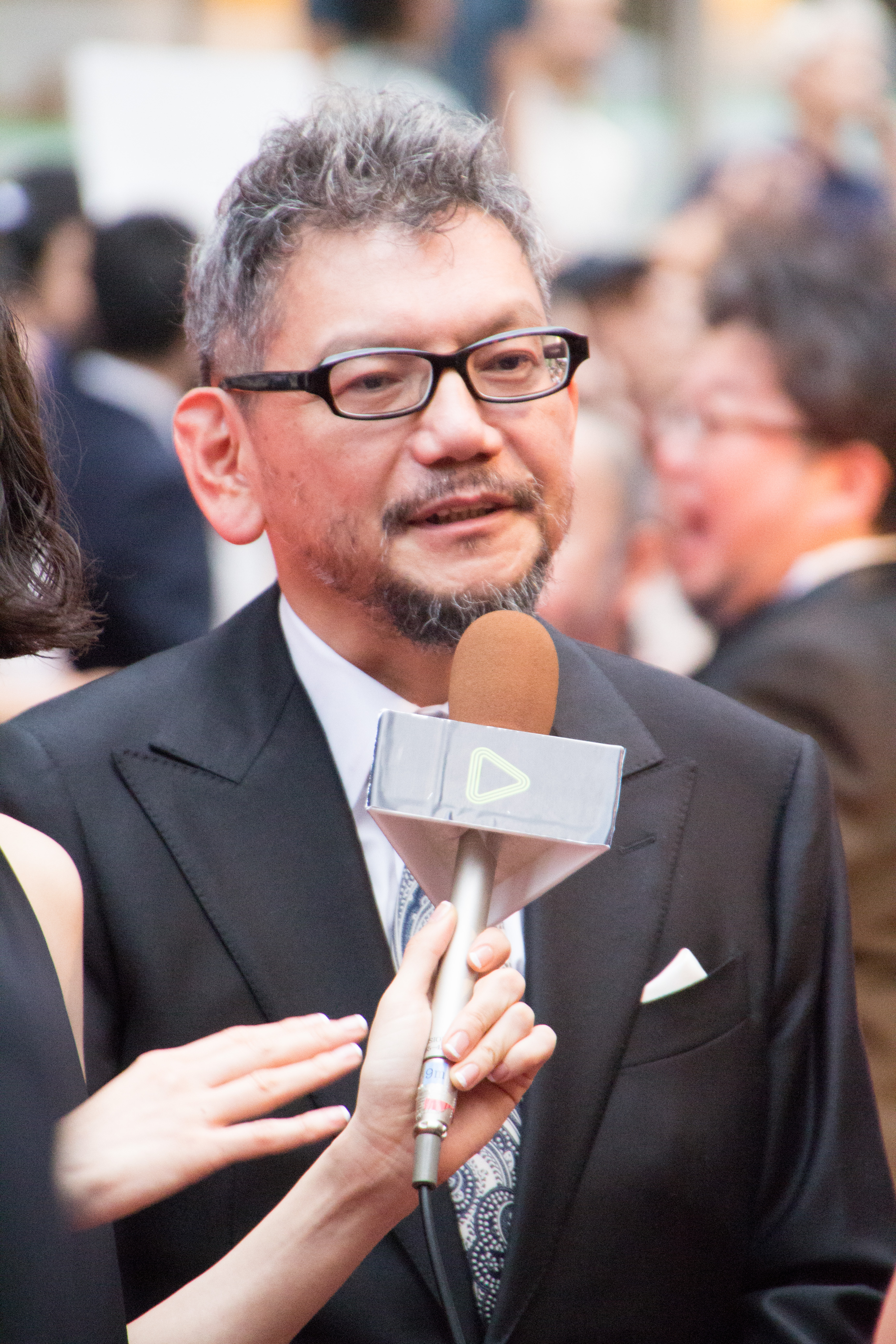
Neon Genesis Evangelion director Hideaki Anno

In 1993 Gainax produced a presentation document of Neon Genesis Evangelion named New Century Evangelion (tentative name) Proposal (新世紀エヴァンゲリオン (仮) 企画書, Shinseiki Evangelion (kari) kikakusho), containing a first draft of the planned episodes. The Proposal document was then published in 1994. In the first draft, the basic plot for the sixth episode was already planned, and the Japanese title "Showdown in Tokyo-3" was decided. "The Eva's revenge" was also planned to take place in the installment. Neon Genesis Evangelion's director Hideaki Anno and Akio Satsukawa wrote "Rei II", while Masayuki drew the storyboards. Hiroyuki Ishido served as director, Nobuhiro Hosoi as chief animator, and Rei Yumeno as assistant character designer. Megumi Hayashibara, Rei's voice actress, performed the voice of an anonymous woman making time announcements during the process; Tetsuya Iwanaga and Tomokazu Seki voiced unnamed Nerv operators, while Yūko Miyamura voiced a female announcer. A version of Bart Howard's "Fly Me to the Moon" named "Rei #6" sung by Hayashibara was also used for the ending theme of the episode.

Anno felt stuck after writing the script for the first episode, "Angel Attack", which took half a year to complete, and he wrote "Rei I" and "Rei II" before the third and fourth episodes. In the staff's original plans, after the battle against Angel Shamshel in the third episode "A Transfer", Shinji would become friends with his classmates Toji Suzuhara and Kensuke Aida in the episode finale, receiving a call from them. As production progressed, however, staff members said they thought there was a need to depict Shinji's relationships with the people around him after the third episode. As they were writing the scripts and the screenplay, the staff also felt that it would be logically implausible to have Shinji pilot Eva-01 again without first considering the effects of the boy's traumatic experience, so the fourth episode, "Hedgehog's Dilemma", was added to the plan. For production reasons, the post-recording dubbing followed the same order. In the episode's original script draft, Gainax had not yet decided on either the name Operation Yashima or the scene in which Shinji pries open Eva-00's cockpit by hand to rescue Rei. The staff also planned a scene following Rei's smile in which Gendo would watch Rei smiling at Shinji on a monitor before giving her a cold look.

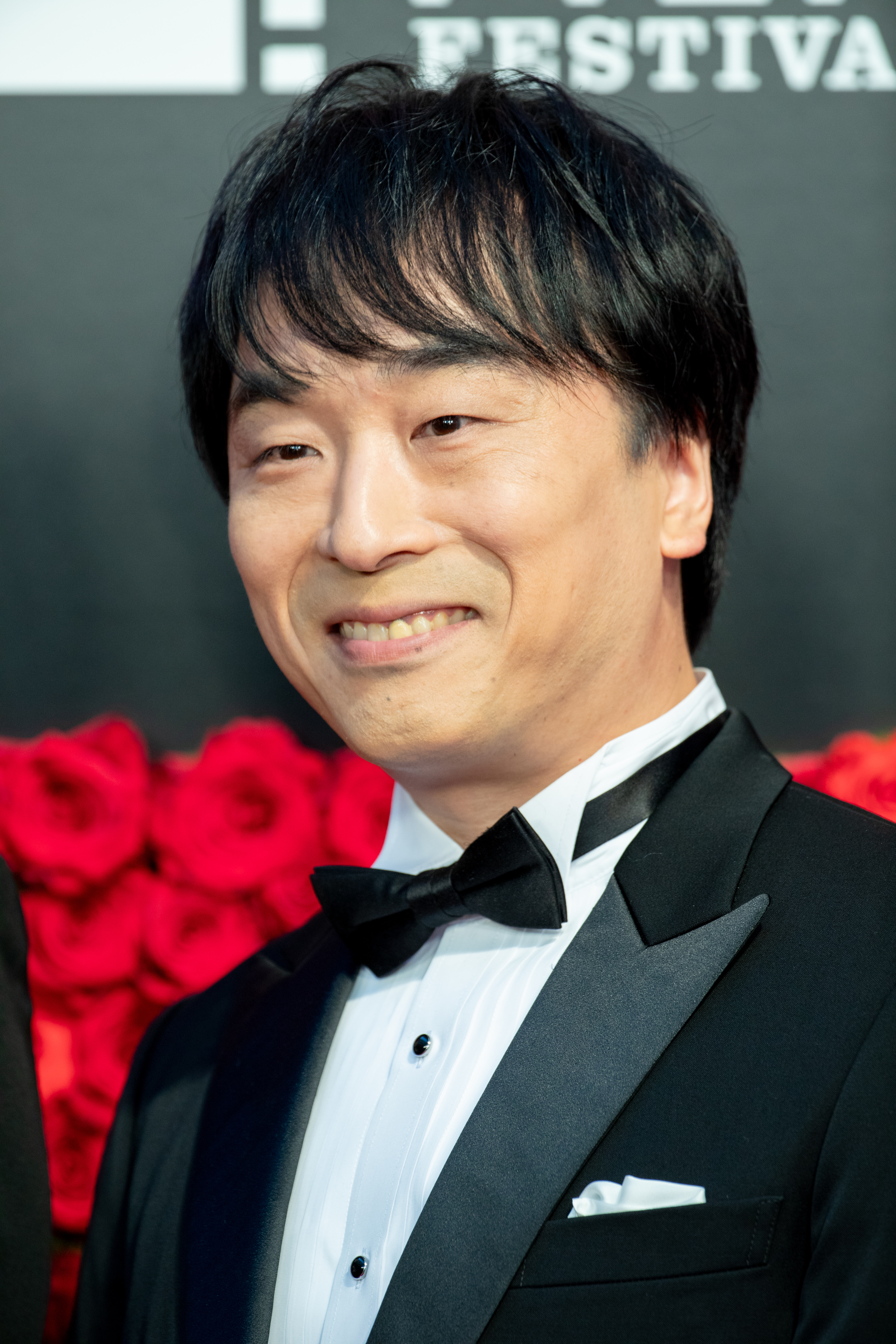
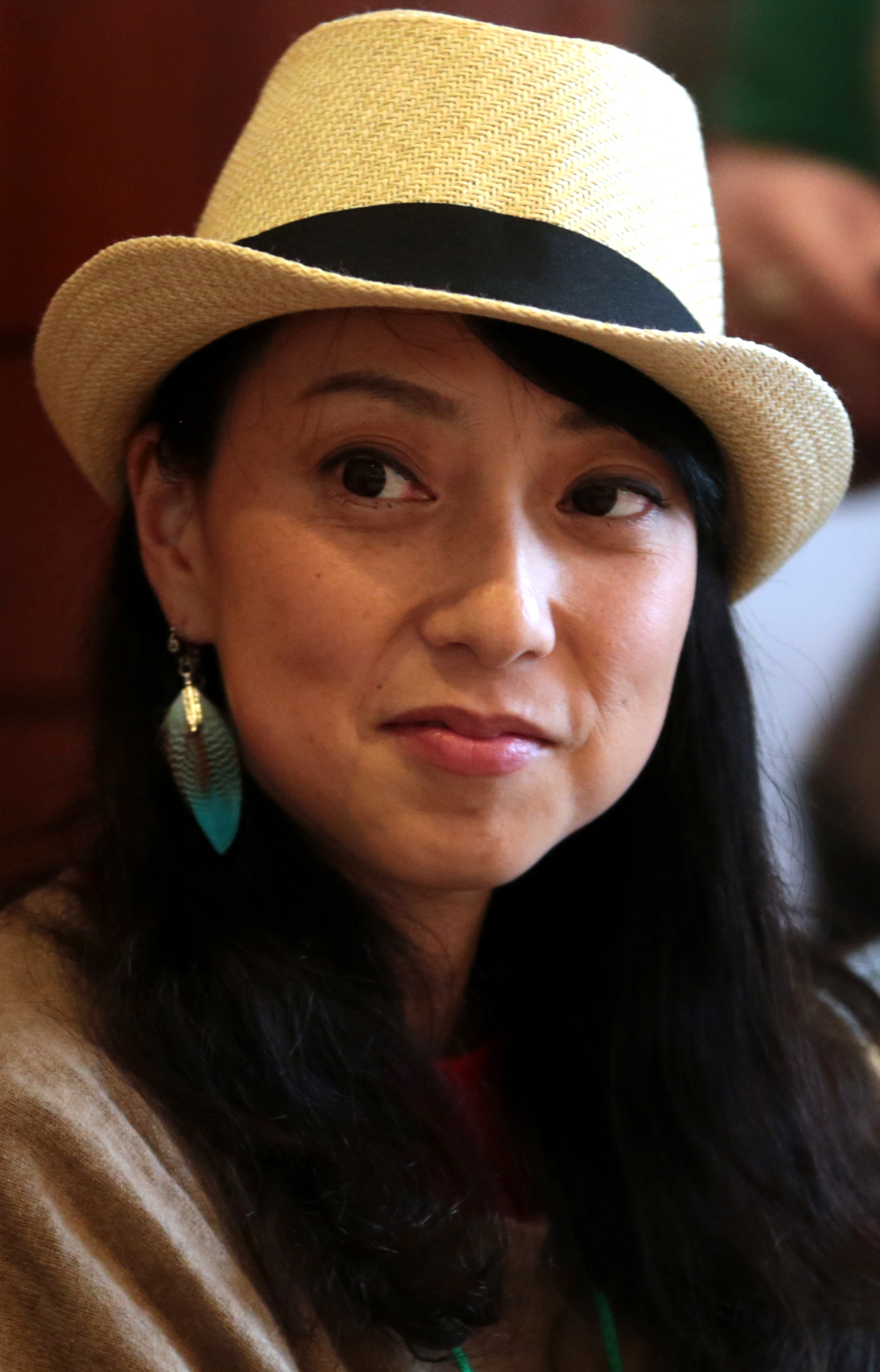
Tomokazu Seki and Yūko Miyamura, the original voice actors of the characters Toji Suzuhara and Asuka Langley Soryu in the show, voiced announcements audible in the background during Operation Yashima.

Academic José Andrés Santiago Iglesias noted that, during the scene in which Misato asks Gendo Ikari to approve Operation Yashima, the conversation between them lasts more than twenty seconds, but it consists entirely of two static shots; Iglesias mentioned this as an example of Neon Genesis Evangelion's extensive use of limited animation, in which "the scene is animated by a variation on shot-reverse-shot and cross-dialogue techniques". The episode marked the first time two Evangelion units were portrayed at the same time, so they were intentionally represented with few movements, with the Eva-00 using only a shield and the Eva-01 motionless while shooting Ramiel, to save animation resources. Ramiel's design, made by Anno himself, was also conceived to save money. While Sachiel, the Angel from the first and second episodes, has a humanoid shape, Ramiel has a geometric abstract shape, because the staff did not have enough resources for an anthropomorphic enemy. Moreover, according to series assistant director Kazuya Tsurumaki, "everything after the storyboard was ordered by another company", and Gainax had no control over it. Yashima Operation was delegated to Vega Entertainment instead.

In "Rei II", captions were used to create a documentary feel, a technique Anno previously used in Gunbuster. The installment also depicts real existing places during the preparations for Operation Yashima, such as Mount Futago, Makurazaki, Betsukai, Ube, and Mitaka Ward of Tokyo, the birthplace of Anno and the place of the headquarters of Gainax, respectively. Real-world brands were featured in the Operation Yashima preparation scenes, such as the Sega Saturn consoles and Shimorak milk. A map of Japan is also framed during the operation. According to Gualtiero Cannarsi, who curated the Italian adaptation of the series, since Second Impact raised the sea level in the Evangelion universe the map has slight differences from reality, as smaller islands are difficult to trace on the map, while the main islands of Honshū, Hokkaidō, Shikoku, and Kyūshū have different shapes. Anno encountered difficulties while writing for Rei, not feeling "particularly interested" or relating to her, but he thought of her as a representation of his unconscious mind and shaped the character with the phrase "You won't die, I will protect you". He also inserted a scene where Rei smiles at Shinji at the end of the episode, but he later regretted it, since Shinji and Rei manage to communicate with each other and establish emotional contact in the episode; according to Anno, the character of Rei thus reaches its conclusion smiling.

== Cultural references ==
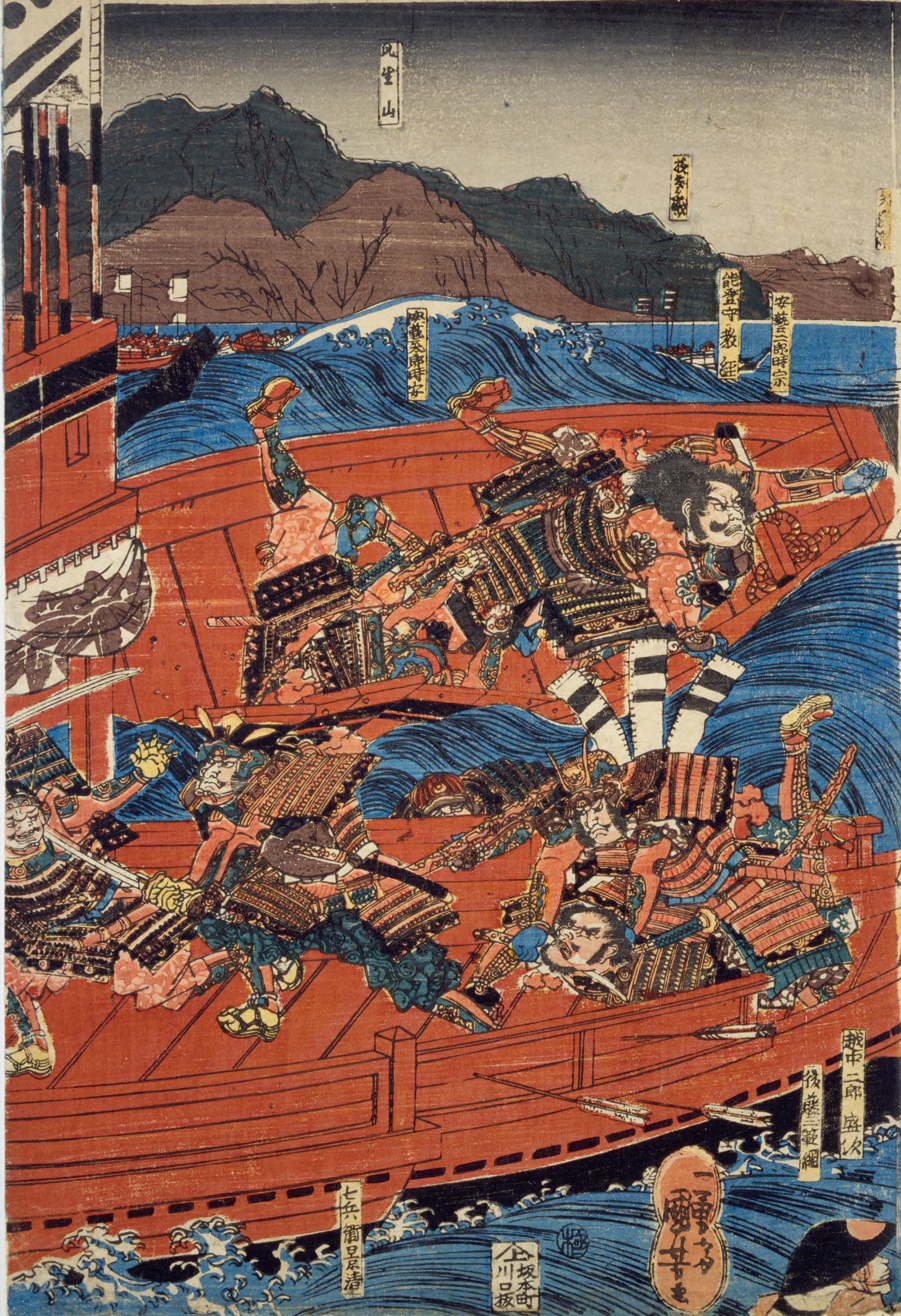
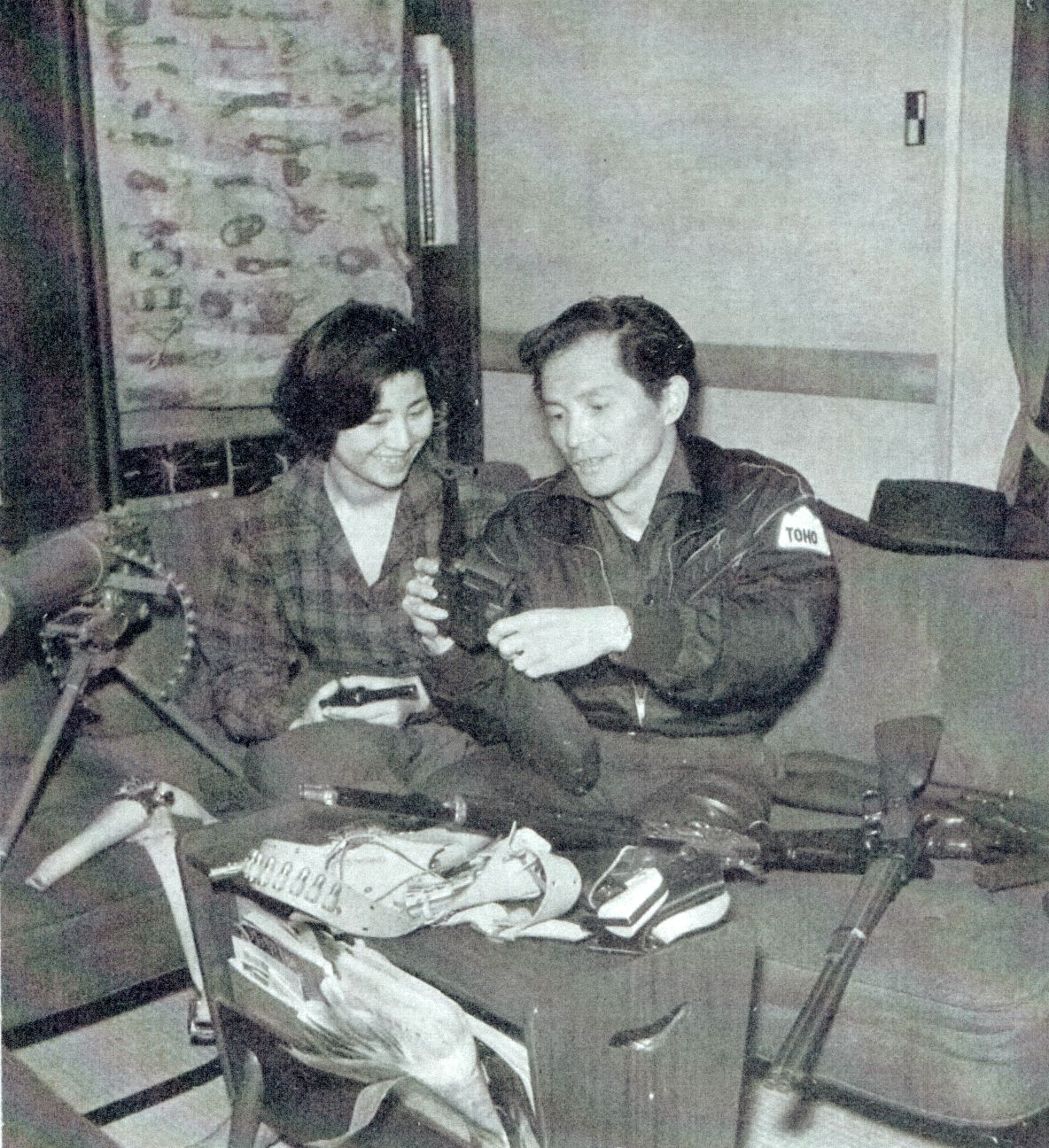
For the name of Operation Yashima, the staff took inspiration from the Battle of Yashima in 1185. Characters throughout the episodes also make use of the ticker tape, a gimmick which can also be found in the works of director Kihachi Okamoto.

According to Yūichirō Oguro, an editor of some Japanese home video editions of Evangelion, the Japanese title "Showdown in Tokyo-3" is a possible reference to the sixth episode of Return of Ultraman, "Showdown! Monsters vs. MAT". Like "Rei II", "Showdown! Monsters vs. MAT" contains a large-scale operation. Oguro noted that ticker tape is also used during the episode, similarly to Anno's previous works Gunbuster and Nadia: The Secret of Blue Water. He compared the use of ticker tape to the works of Japanese director Kihachi Okamoto. Critics also speculated that Ramiel's design was influenced by an enemy that first appeared in Mirai Keisatsu Urashiman anime series and some abstract geometric elements visible in the final abstract scenes from Stanley Kubrick's movie 2001: A Space Odyssey (1968).

The name of Operation Yashima originates from the Battle of Yashima, fought in 1185, during the Genpei War. According to a legend, the samurai warrior Nasu no Yoichi, riding his horse, shot an arrow through the water and hit the red fan of his enemy Tamamushi, resolving the battle in favor of the Minamoto clan. Ramiel is similarly centered and beaten in Neon Genesis Evangelion by a precise shot fired from a position located across the waters of Lake Ashi, Mount Futago. The operation's name also derives from yashima (八島), which can be translated as "eight islands", an ancient epithet of Japan, a reference to the Positron Rifle's electrical energy, taken from the entire Japanese archipelago. The naming is the result of a specific request from the series' director, Hideaki Anno, who asked to include something related to the name Yashima during the production.

In "Rei II" scientific concepts are used as well. During Operation Yashima, for example, Eva-00 uses an SSTO as a shield, while Eva-01 uses the Positron Sniper Rifle as a firearm, which draws its power from positron particles, generating a bright beam of photons. The Positron Rifle is actually a self-propelled positron gun developed by the Strategic Self-Defence Forces and later requisitioned by Nerv for Eva units in the series. Angel Ramiel has a nuclear reactor in its body, fighting with a charged particle beam. The expression "phase transition space" is mentioned. The book Evangelion Glossary (エヴァンゲリオン用語事典, Evangerion Yougo Jiten) by Yahata Shoten linked the expression to the phase change and the cosmological phase transition. The Magi System, a biological supercomputer composed of three computers that rule Nerv and Tokyo-3, is also mentioned for the first time in the episode. The Magi System is a democratic and rational system similar to the concept of artificial intelligence. Its name originates from the Biblical Magi mentioned in the Gospel of Matthew, traditionally named Balthasar, Gaspar, and Melchior. Their names first appeared in an eighth-century religious chronicle named Excerpta Latina Barbari. According to the official Neon Genesis Evangelion film books, like the three astrologers from whom it takes its name, the supercomputer is composed of three independent calculators that to solve any kind of problem consult each other and make a decision by majority. Writers Víctor Sellés de Lucas and Manuel Hernández-Pérez similarly wrote that, as later Christian tradition identified Magi as astrologers and scholars, the Magi System "operates as a council of the wise and sometimes even as an oracle of sorts".

== Themes ==
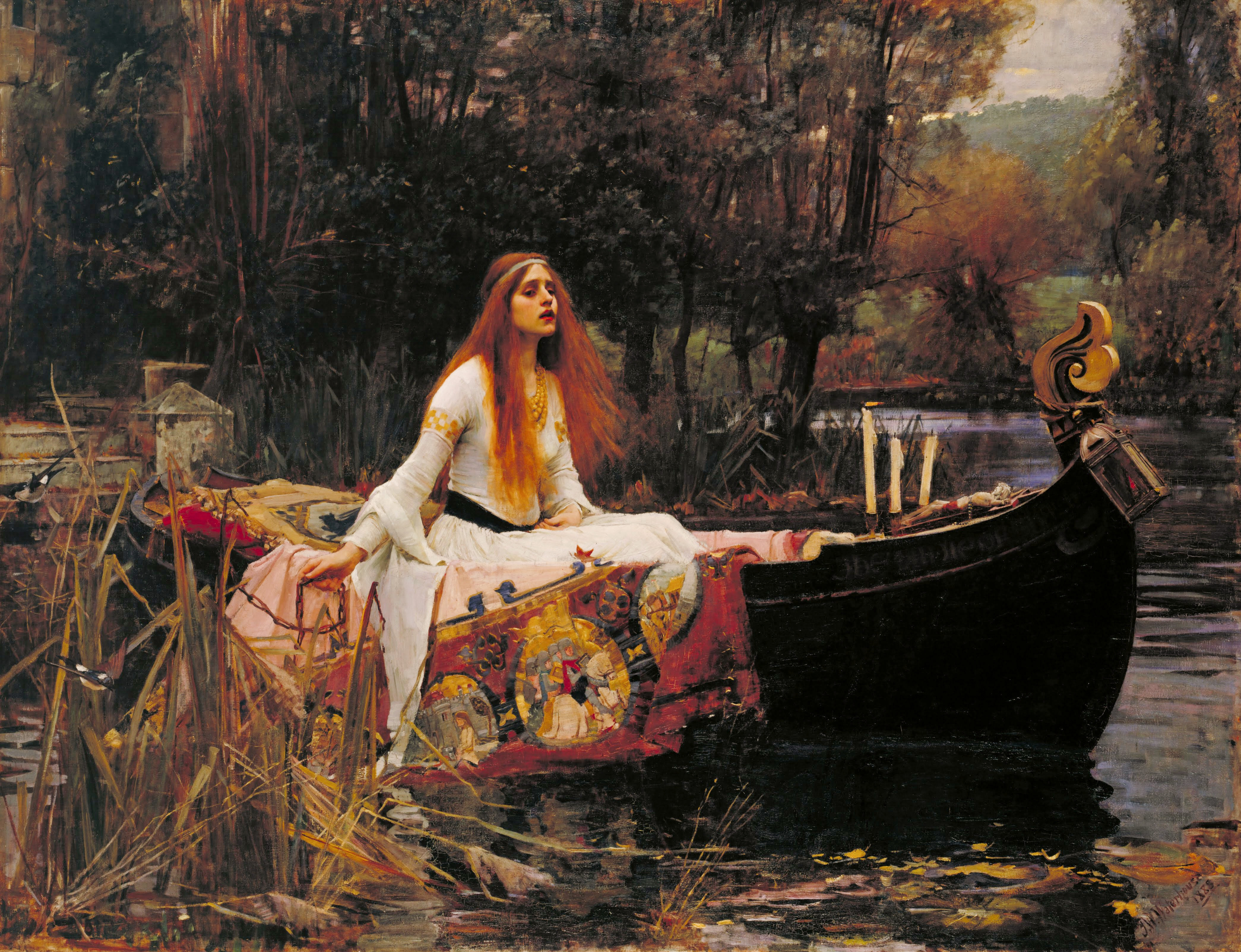
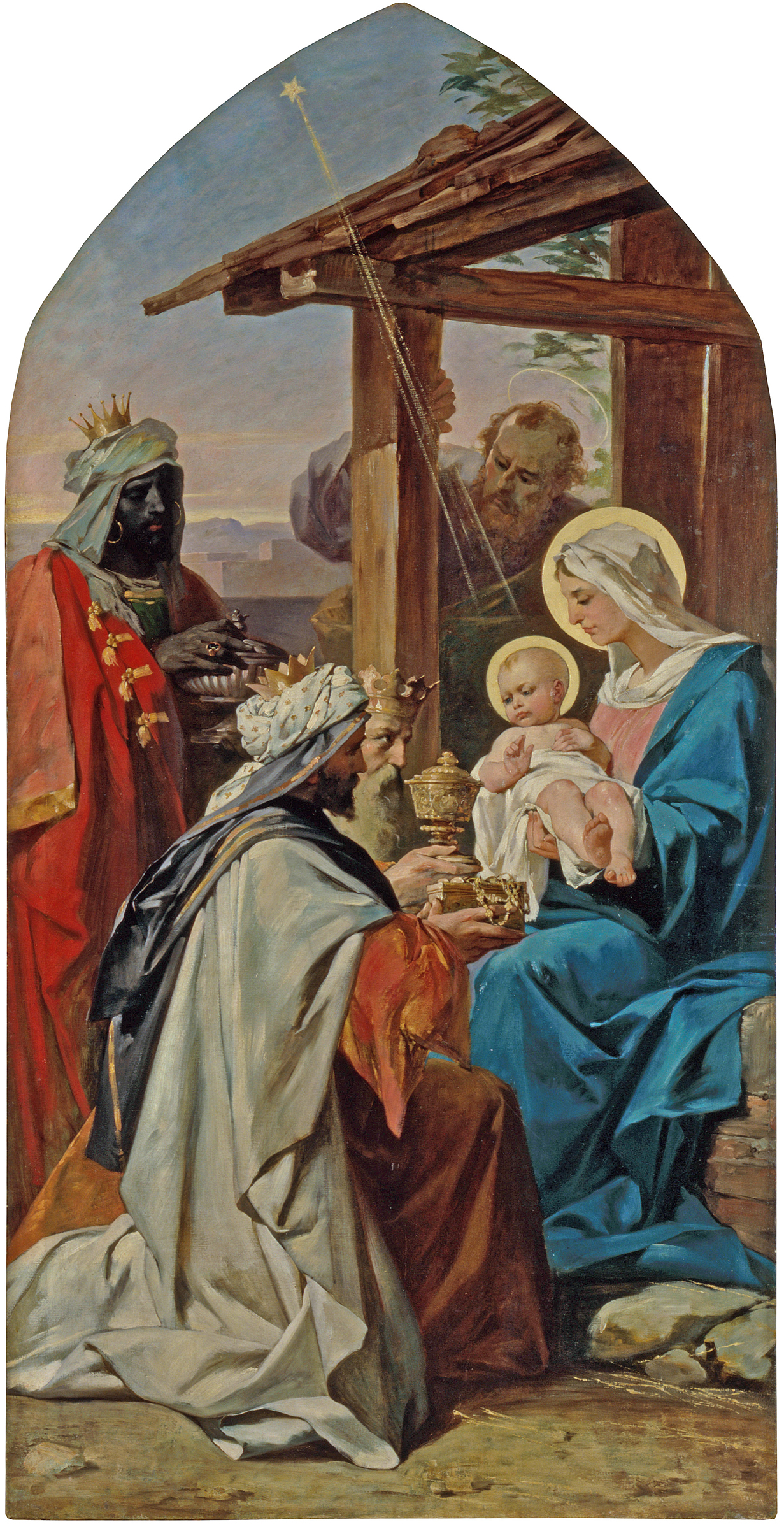
Rei's attitude has been compared to the fragile and chaste women portrayed in fin de siècle art, while her image with the Moon in the background has led critics to link her to the Christian figure of the Virgin Mary. Biblical Magi are also referenced in the episode.

Like the previous episode, "Rei II" depicts the inner world of Rei Ayanami, the focus of the episode. Neon Genesis Evangelion's assistant director Kazuya Tsurumaki pointed out how "distant, awkward communication" can be initially observed between Shinji and Rei in the first episodes, describing Evangelion as a story about communication. In "Rei I", Shinji, while beginning to come to terms with his role as an Evangelion pilot,, discovers to his surprise that his cold father Gendo smiles and shows affection towards Rei. He changes his whole perspective after this and decides to communicate with Rei. Rei, however, rejects Shinji's communication attempts with a cold attitude. At the end of the episode, Shinji saves her in a similar way to how his father Gendo did in the previous episode. Shinji bursts into tears, and Rei says she doesn't know what to do at times like that; Shinji advises her to smile. Rei overlays Shinji's and Gendo's faces and smiles, and it is not clear if she is able to understand Shinji's feelings in the scene. For critic Manabu Tsuribe, the show reaches its climax at the smile scene, and "as a story of 'growth and independence of a boy'—like a Bildungsroman—ended there once. Evangelion as a story has stopped there". According to Screen Rant writer Zach Zamora, "from the perspective of someone new to the series, this moment could be read as Shinji's first steps toward filling the stereotypical hero role of the franchise". Kazuya Tsurumaki also described the sixth episode as a key moment in the characters' development and said it could just as easily have served as the series finale. Assistant director Masayuki gave a similar interpretation.

According to scholar Dennis Redmond, "Rei II" illustrates the Japanese national power grid via a satellite shot of Japan from outer space; he also compared the social and natural landscapes of Evangelion to that of postwar Japan. Evangelion Chronicle magazine noted how the tactical realism of Operation Yashima was a rarity for anime at the time. The magazine linked the realism of the strategy to the Gulf War, the images of which had a high resonance in the Japanese and world media; following the conflict from the 1990s onwards, there was an increased focus on the war realism of the fighting in TV shows. For scholar David Bordonaba-Plous, the strategy reflects the ambivalent psychology of Misato Katsuragi and her hybrid approach to difficult situations, since it is mediated by both theoretical and empirical knowledge. According to writer Álvaro Arbonés, unlike the previous episodes, characterized by unconventional narration and experimentalism, in "Rei II" Anno resumes a classic and linear narrative structure. Arbonés also argued that up until the fourth episode, the entire story was filtered through Shinji's point of view; from "Rei I" onward, however, the other characters' perspectives are explored as well. Gualtiero Cannarsi similarly noted how "Rei II" has a more pressing and brutal pace than the previous episode. Over the course of the story, Misato demonstrates that she has developed a strong emotional attachment towards Shinji, worrying about him. Shinji, on the other hand, shows that he has developed a form of dependence towards Rei. According to Cannarsi, before the battle against Ramiel begins, Shinji complains to Rei about his problems, throwing tantrums like a small child in an attempt to receive emotional support from Rei. Shinji, however, remains surprised by Rei's reaction, who demonstrates indifference instead towards his protests. He also realizes how much he cares about Rei during "Rei II".

According to Evangelion Chronicle, the episode draws clear parallels between Rei and Gendo on the one hand and Shinji and Misato on the other. At the beginning of the episode, Misato worries about a pilot in danger and comes to his aid, mirroring Gendo's actions during the Eva-00 activation test at the beginning of the previous episode; by contrast, Gendo never appears when Shinji finds himself in danger, further emphasizing Misato's protective nature. In the scene before the beginning of the Yashima Operation, Shinji asks Rei the reason that pushes her to want to pilot Evangelion 00; Rei replies saying that she has nothing else and she finds her "bond" with other people in this. She does reveal that it's through piloting her Evangelion that she feels connected with other human beings. For sociologist Satomi Ishikawa, this shows that she is committed to the struggle against the Angels "as if it were the only reason why she exists". As noted by scholar Zachary Vereb, Rei's decision to fight doesn't reflect a duty to humanity, since she hasn't thought carefully about it; Rei's decision is made for her, as she doesn't know who she is or what she wants. According to Vereb, Rei is a "very dissociated character" with no autonomous decisions, and she pilots Eva-00 lacking identity and autonomy. Dennis Redmond noted that Rei is silhouetted against a close-up of the full Moon before the Yashima Operation. Writer Yumiko Yano noted that the Moon is a celestial body associated with passivity and femininity and observed an unattainable aura in Rei, comparing her to the Virgin Mary. Yano also associated her figure with the fragile and chaste women portrayed in fin de siècle art, particularly popular among the works of Symbolist painters. According to reviewer Akio Nagatomi, Rei's attitude in the episode also reflects one of the traits of traditional Japanese society, the martyr complex, in which a person will do whatever it takes to accomplish a given task, regardless of personal consequences. Álvaro Arbonés noted Rei is able to glimpse her feelings and humanity in "Rei II", as she discovers that not only Gendo cares about her, but that, like Gendo, Shinji also wants to protect her and see her smile. According to him, Rei doesn't become human all at once, because Gendo saves her, but she must go step by step: she must open up to Gendo, then to Shinji, reflecting Shinji's gradual personal journey.

== Reception ==
Whenever Evangelion utilizes the idea of countdowns or final solutions, the drama amps up to another level. "Rei II" utilizes this idea to the fullest, making us believe that this is truly a do or die situation. This episode is heavy on action and drama making it one of the more exciting episodes in the series' run.

— Max Covill (Film School Rejects)

"Rei II" was first broadcast on November 8, 1995, and scored a 7.7% rating of audience share on Japanese TV, the highest up to that point. According to animator Jun'ichi Satō, after the episode's broadcast Neon Genesis Evangelion and Rei Ayanami enjoyed high sales in the Japanese market of fan-made comics, known as dōjinshi. In 1996, the episode ranked fourth among Animage's list of best anime episodes of the moment. In February 1996, Japanese Animedia magazine ranked Rei's smile scene among the most memorable anime moments of the month. The magazine also said, "Even those who aren't fans will be captivated by the scene". TV Asahi later published a ranking of the most significant scenes in the history of animation; the scene where "Rei Ayanami smiles at Shinji for the first time" managed to reach 14th position. Rei's smile also appeared in another ranking of the broadcaster, winning 45th place. Ramiel was particularly well received by fans, being considered one of Evangelion's best enemies, while Operation Yashima became one of the most popular fights in the series. In July 2020, Comic Book Resources reported an 8.3/10 rating on IMDb for the installment, ranking it ninth among the highest-rated Evangelion episodes.

Rei Ayanami's smile at the end of the episode was described by director Hideaki Anno as the end of the character and by critics as the end of Evangelion as a grand narrative. The scene attracted positive comments from anime reviewers.

"Rei II" received a positive reception from critics and reviewers, especially for Rei's smile scene. Anime magazine Newtype praised "Rei II", describing the scene where Rei greets Shinji before the battle against the Angel Ramiel as "impressive". The Artifice's Justin Wu also praised the scene of Rei's smile, describing it as a "powerful" and "iconic moment", since it is "the first time she has deliberately shown an emotion, and one of the handful of times she has done so throughout the whole series". Merumo described it as a "touching" moment. According to writer Dennis Redmond, Rei's smile is one of many "extraordinary moments" in the series where battles "artfully embellish, rather than overwhelm, the subtlest of character interaction". Comic Book Resources' Devin Meenan praised Rei's smile scene as "one of the most touching moments" of Neon Genesis Evangelion. Film School Rejects' Max Covill similarly described "Rei II" as "one of the more exciting episodes in the series' run", praising a shot depicting the dark silhouettes of Misato, Shinji, and Rei for the usage of negative space and hard lines.

Protoculture Addicts gave a positive review to the home video issue with "Rei I" and "Rei II". The Animé Café's Akio Nagatomi praised the parallels between "Rei I" and "Rei II" as "interesting", the acting of voice actresses Megumi Ogata as Shinji Ikari and Mitsuishi Kotono as Misato Katsuragi, and Rei's reaction towards Shinji: "Even though the outcome is entirely predictable, it's fairly well written". Comic Book Resources and Screen Rant listed the battle against Ramiel among the best Neon Genesis Evangelion fights; Screen Rant also listed "Rei II" among the best Neon Genesis Evangelion episodes. SyFy Wire's Daniel Dockery listed Operation Yashima as one of the "most awesome non-depressing" moments in the show. Animator Yūichirō Oguro eulogized the sense of sci-fi romance as Japan's lights go out and the archipelago goes completely dark. Dennis Redmond similarly lauded the shots of the sequence of Tokyo-3 going dark as "magnificent" and the "brilliant sequence of frames" shown during Shinji and Rei's conversation, while Multiversity Comics' Matthew Garcia positively commented on the use of traditional animation for the Operation Yashima. For Kotaku's editor Peter Tieryas the episode "epitomized what makes the series so mesmerising"; he also praised the tactical element to the battle and its realism.

=== Legacy ===
The episode inspired official merchandise, including a line of official T-shirts. In 1996, an Evangelion-inspired role-playing game entitled Neon Genesis Evangelion RPG Decisive Battle in Tokyo-3 (新世紀エヴァンゲリオンRPG 決戦!第3新東京市, Shin Seiki Evangerion RPG Kessen, Daisan shin Tokyo-shi) was released. Operation Yashima was later used for the movie Evangelion: 1.0 You Are (Not) Alone (2007) and a pachinko named CR Shinseiki Evangelion: Saigo no shisha (CR新世紀エヴァンゲリオン ～最後のシ者～, "CR Neon Genesis Evangelion: The Last Messenger"), released in Japan in April 2009. It also inspired official merchandise, including model railways, clothing, keychains, action figures, tenugui, notebooks, sculptures, food and watches.

After the 2011 Tōhoku earthquake and tsunami, Tokyo Electric Power Company invited Japanese people to conserve electricity, and an unofficial campaign began under the name "Operation Yashima" (Yashima Sakusen) on Twitter. The Twitter hashtag #yashimasakusen110312 went viral, while #84MA (pronounced Yashima) reached about 50,000 tweets in two days. According to The Anime Encyclopedia, with the real Yashima Operation Evangelion became part of the mass media; its writers Jonathan Clements and Helen McCarthy noted that the franchise was probably at the high point of its 21st-century popularity at the time, having reached a wide audience in Japan. In 2019, the Yashima Operation also inspired a "Nerv" disaster app after Typhoon Faxai hit the Kantō region. In 2020, an event dedicated to the Yashima Operation was announced in the city of Hakone, the area where the fictional city of Tokyo-3 is imaginatively located; new merchandise articles on the series were also announced. During the event, organized on two dates (March 28 and May 23), a live performance of "Cruel Angel's Thesis"'s singer Yōko Takahashi was planned, but the dates were canceled due to the COVID-19 pandemic. In 2021, the Governor of Tokyo Yuriko Koike asked the city to turn off lights after 8 pm to discourage going out at night and fight Coronavirus. The media associated her request with Operation Yashima, ushering in another Twitter trend.

The creators of the video game Genshin Impact drew inspiration from Ramiel's design for the conception of some life forms called Hypostasis. The website Final Fantasy Dream compared Sister Ray, a weapon that appeared in Final Fantasy VII, to the Positron Rifle used by Shinji during the Yashima Operation. British band Fightstar published a song named "Shinji Ikari", which contains the line "I grow old after one shot", which Japanese website Anibu described as a possible reference to "Rei II". The Nippon Professional Baseball team Hanshin Tigers used the OST "Decisive Battle" during the matches after Operation Yashima, a choice that attracted attention in the Japanese media. The same OST was used in the third episode of the Japanese TV series Rikokatsu. Rei's line "You won't die, because I'll protect you" is also parodied in a Nisemonogatari episode.
