= Kauf (musician) =

American electronic music group

- Genres: Electronic, alternative, indie pop, electronica
- Years active: 2011–present
- Labels: One Half Records, Cutters Records
- Members: Ronald Kaufman
- Website: www.kaufaudio.com

Ronald Kaufman, better known by the moniker Kauf, is an electronic/indie musician based in Los Angeles, United States. To date, Kauf has released an EP & a debut album. His track "When You're Out" & his remix of Tony Castles' "Heart In The Pipes" were both featured in the 2013 video game Grand Theft Auto V.

== Biography ==
Kauf first surfaced as a remix artist in 2011, eventually releasing his own music in 2013. After continuing to produce more remixes for a number of artists and musicians from 2014 onward, and steadily releasing singles of his own, he finally released his debut album in October, 2017.

The album was later remixed by many prominent musicians, including: Thomaas Banks of Psychemagik, Battle Tapes & Fort Romeau.

== Discography ==
=== Albums ===
- Regrowth, One Half Records (2017)

=== Extended plays ===
- As Much Again, Cutters Records (2013)

=== Remix albums ===
- Regrowth Remixed, One Half Records (2018)

=== Singles ===
- Lakes (2020)
- Moonscent (2020)
- Entropies (2020)
- Reimagined (2020)
- Time Pass (2020)

=== Collaborations ===
- Am I Crazy (featuring Overjoy) (2020)

=== As featured artist ===
- BAILE - Painting Out (2019)
- Lane 8 - How Often (2020)
- BAILE - Leave Me (2020)
- Jerro - Tunnel Vision (2020)
- Collé - Losing Time (2020)

=== Remixes ===
- Tony Castles - Heart In The Pipes (2011)
- Moons - Bloody Mouth (2014)
- Poliça - Chain My Name (2014)
- Labyrinth Ear - Lorna (2014)
- Public Service Broadcasting - Go! (2015)
- The Big Pink - Beautiful Criminal (2016)
- Grapell - Arrow (2016)
- David Douglas - Highway of Love (2017)
- DRAMA - Hopes Up (2018)
- Haulm - They Came Along (2018)
- STRFKR - Tape Machine (2018)
- Kauf - Through the Yard (with CLARA-NOVA) (2018)
- Kauf - Am I Crazy (featuring Overjoy) (2020)
