= Heitō Glacier =

Glacier in Antarctica

- Location of Queen Maud Land in Antarctica

- Location within Antarctica
- Location: Queen Maud Land
- Coordinates: 69°16′S 39°48′E
- Thickness: unknown
- Terminus: Langhovde Hills
- Status: unknown

Heitō Glacier (69°16′S 39°48′E) is a small glacier draining westward along the south side of Mount Heitō in the southern part of the Langhovde Hills, Queen Maud Land, Antarctica. It was mapped from surveys and air photos by the Japanese Antarctic Research Expedition (JARE), 1957–62, and was named Heitō-hyoga (flat-top glacier) for its proximity to Mount Heitō by JARE Headquarters in 1973.

== See also ==
- List of glaciers in the Antarctic
- Glaciology
