= Battle Tapes =

American electronic rock band

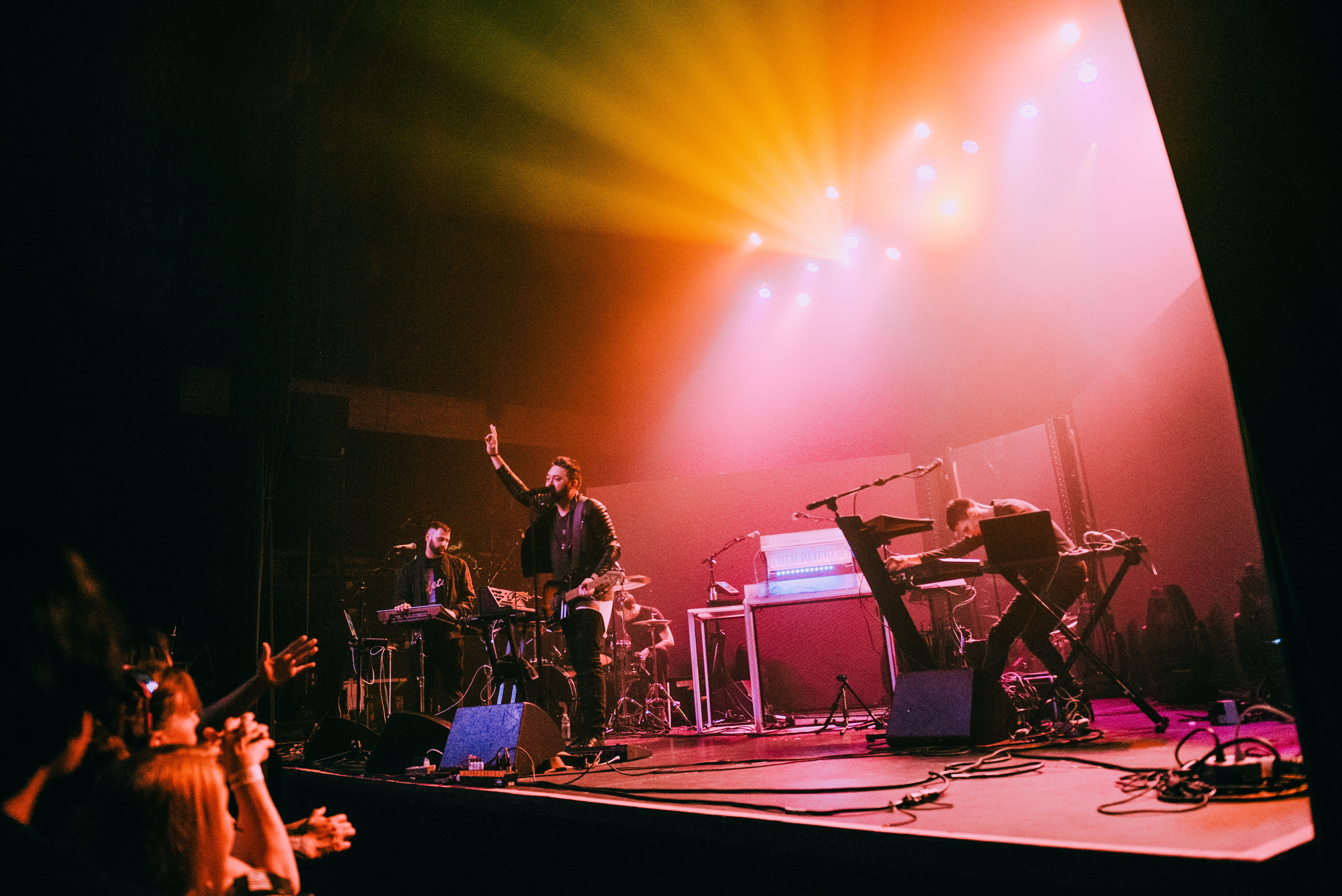
- Battle Tapes, April 2018

Background information
- Origin: Los Angeles, California, United States
- Genre: Electronic rock
- Years active: 2010–present
- Members: Josh Boardman; Riley Mackin; Josh D'Elia; Pete Kraynak
- Past members: Stephen Bannister
- Website: http://www.battletapesband.com

Battle Tapes is an American electronic rock band, based in Los Angeles, California, United States, formed in late 2010. The band consists of Josh Boardman (vocals, guitar, synthesizer), Riley Mackin (keyboards, programming, vocals), Josh D'Elia (bass guitar, backup vocals) and Pete Kraynak (drums, percussion). Battle Tapes is known for its live performances, fully sequenced lighting and visuals and integrating electro and indie influences into its music and image.

To date, Battle Tapes has released four EPs: Sleepwalker (2011), Sweatshop Boys (2012), Solid Gold (2016), and Form (2017). They released their first studio album Polygon on November 20, 2015. They have released several singles: Valkyrie (Radio Edit) (2015), No Good (2017), Weight of the World (2019), If Only (2022), In Too Deep (2022), One Night in Burbank (2023), and Brand New (2023). Their second studio album Texture was released on May 5, 2023.

Battle Tapes gained increased popularity in 2013, when their song "Feel the Same" from the Sweatshop Boys EP was featured in Rockstar Games' Grand Theft Auto V, on the in-game radio station Radio Mirror Park. The band also gained additional popularity in 2018, when several of their songs were featured in the Rooster Teeth web series Gen:Lock, with "Belgrade" used as its main theme.

Battle Tapes made their festival debut in 2014, performing at The Sunset Strip Music Festival in Los Angeles, as well as SXSW in Austin, Texas. In early 2015, Battle Tapes announced they would be playing at the BottleRock Napa Valley Festival in May later that year.

== Discography ==
=== Studio albums ===
Title	Details
Polygon	Released: November 20, 2015
Texture	Released: May 5, 2023

=== Extended plays (EP) ===
Title	Details
Sleepwalker	Released: May 12, 2011
Sweatshop Boys	Released: April 13, 2012
Solid Gold (feat. Party Nails)	Released: April 3, 2016
Form	Released: July 14, 2017

=== Singles ===
Title	Details
Valkyrie (Radio Edit)	Released: October 10, 2015
No Good	Released: April 21, 2017
Weight of the World	Released: February 22, 2019
If Only	Released: July 8, 2022
In Too Deep	Released: September 9, 2022
One Night in Burbank	Released: March 17, 2023
Brand New	Released: May 5, 2023

=== Remixes (by other artists) ===
Title	Artist	Album	Details
Sleepwalker	Slighter (As Slighter's Wide Awake Remix)	Sleepwalker EP	Released: May 12, 2011
Sleepwalker	The Radish	Sleepwalker EP	Released: May 12, 2011
Sleepwalker	Lordx	Sleepwalker EP	Released: May 12, 2011
Solid Gold	Story of the Running Wolf	Solid Gold EP	Released: April 3, 2016
Solid Gold	The Beta Machine	Solid Gold EP	Released: April 3, 2016
If Only	The Anix		Released: July 29, 2022
If Only	Snakes of Russia		Released: August 5, 2022
In Too Deep	Lenno		Released: October 7, 2022

=== Remixes (by Battle Tapes) ===
Some of these remixes were never officially released on any streaming platforms.

Title	Original Artist	Album	Details
Sleepwalker Pt. III	Battle Tapes (As Abstracted Camouflage Remix)	Sleepwalker EP	Released: May 12, 2011
LA Water	Helmet		Released: January 7, 2011
Balloon	Wendy & Lisa		Released: January 7, 2011
I Like Van Halen...	El Ten Eleven		Released: September 14, 2011
Palm Springs Reset	Julien-K	We're Here With You (Deluxe Edition)	Released: September 11, 2012
Time	Uh Huh Her	Uhh Remixed	Released: May 13, 2014
Sweatpants	Childish Gambino		Released: July 31, 2014
Solid Gold (Remix 1 & 2)	Battle Tapes	Solid Gold EP	Released: April 3, 2016
You Don't Get Me High Anymore	Phantogram		Released: May 4, 2017
Never Dance Again	Sunset Neon	Starlight (Remixes)	Released: May 10, 2018 (Single); Released: January 24, 2019 (Album)
100	Kauf	Regrowth Remixed	Released: August 31, 2018
Have You Ever (feat. Party Nails)	Urban Heat		Released: December 23, 2022
Pitchfork	Snakes of Russia	True Surrender Remixes	Released: August 16, 2024
Valkyrie (Rework)	Battle Tapes		Released: November 19, 2025
A Little Wicked	Valerie Broussard	A Little More Wicked	Released: September 25, 2026

== Skeleton Crüe ==
Josh Boardman and Riley Mackin often perform as a duo under the moniker "Skeleton Crüe" — a name derived from the stripped-down size of Battle Tapes, focusing more on a live DJ-style use of drum machines, samplers and synths, in addition to traditional DJ decks.

== In other media ==
- Teen Wolf (season 3, episode 4) - "Made"
- Grand Theft Auto V - "Feel the Same"
- Elementary (season 2, episode 4) - "Sleepwalker"
- National Geographic Channel (Ad Campaign) - "Sweatshop Boys"
- BBC One - Casualty (Series 32 finale promo) - "Feel the Same"
- Need for Speed (Trailer) - "Feel the Same"
- The Originals (season 1, episode 17) - "Feel the Same"
- NBC Sports (Formula 1/Monaco GP) - "Feel the Same"
- State of Affairs (season 1, episode 12) - "Feel the Same"
- Need for Speed (drift races) - "Valkyrie"
- Asphalt Xtreme - "Belgrade"
- Lucifer (season 1, episode 2) - "Valkyrie"
- Bones (season 9, episode 14) - "Sweatshop Boys"
- Now You See Me 2 - "Belgrade"
- Girls - "Solid Gold"
- Lethal Weapon - "Made"
- The Crew 2 - "Dreamboat" & "Mulholland"
- Asphalt 9: Legends - "Valkyrie"
- S.W.A.T. - (season 3, episode 14) - "Made"
- Gen:LOCK (Web series) - "Belgrade" (Main theme), "Syntax" (season 1, episode 2), "Alive" (season 1, episode 3), "Sweatshop Boys" (season 1, episode 4), "Last Resort & Spa" (season 1, episode 4), "Weight of the World" (season 1, episode 8)
- Xbox Elite Wireless Controller Series 2 (Announce Trailer) - "Feel the Same"
- The Blacklist (season 4, episode 21) - "Last Resort and Spa"
- Hyper Scape - "Feel the Same"
- Invincible (TV series) (episode 5) - "Alive"
- The Naked Director (season 2 trailer) - "In Too Deep"
- The Flash (2014 TV series) (season 6, episode 3) - "Made"
