= Fort Romeau =

- Born: Michael Greene; Chester, England
- Occupations: Record producer; DJ
- Years active: 2012–present
- Labels: 100% Silk; Cin Cin; Ghostly International; Live at Robert Johnson; Running Back
- Member of: C.Y.M.; The Violet Hour

Michael Greene, also known as Fort Romeau, is an English record producer and DJ. He released Kingdoms (2012), Insides (2015), and Beings of Light (2022).

Alongside Vampire Weekend's Chris Baio, Greene is also one half of the collaborative project C.Y.M. The duo released their debut album, C.Y.M., in October 2025.

== Biography ==
Born in Chester, Greene grew up in Oxfordshire and went on to study Music and Visual Art in Brighton. After graduating, he moved to London and joined electro-pop duo La Roux as part of their touring band.

In 2012, Greene left La Roux and released his debut studio album, Kingdoms, on US label 100% Silk. EPs have been released on the Running Back and Live at Robert Johnson labels, in addition to songs on compilations from Rush Hour, Cocoon, Correspondent, and Mule Musiq.

In 2013, Greene signed with Ghostly International and released his second studio album, Insides, in 2015, an eclectic mixture of house, kraut, ambient, and techno.

In 2015, Greene and Ali Tillett set up record label Cin Cin, putting out a diverse range of split EPs from new and established artists alike, including Nick Höppner, Ripperton, and Todd Osbourne.

Greene has also released an EP with Massimiliano Pagliara under the name the Violet Hour, on Cocktail D'Amore, and collaborated with Chris Baio of Vampire Weekend as C.Y.M.

In 2022, Greene released his third studio album, Beings of Light, through Ghostly International.

== Discography ==
=== Studio albums ===
- Kingdoms (2012, 100% Silk)
- Insides (2015, Ghostly International)
- Beings of Light (2022, Ghostly International)

=== Compilation albums ===
- Romantic Gestures Vol. 1 (2024, Cin Cin)

=== EPs ===
- Stay True (2013, Ghostly International)
- Fairlights (2015, Running Back)
- Frankfurt Versions (2015, Ghostly International)
- Untitled / Splicing (with Nick Höppner; 2015, Cin Cin)
- Purify / Korgs (with Bézier; 2016, Cin Cin)
- Heaven & Earth (2019, Permanent Vacation)

=== Singles ===
- "SW9" (2013, Ghostly International)
- "Jetée / Desire" (2013, Ghostly International)
- "Her Dream" (2014, Live at Robert Johnson)
- "Secrets & Lies" (2016, Live at Robert Johnson)
- "Reasons" (2017, self-released)

=== Compilations ===
- Musik for Autobahns 2 (2015, Rush Hour)
- Correspondant Compilation 05 (2017, Correspondent Music)
- Lifesaver Compilation (2017, Live at Robert Johnson)
- The Sound of Café Del Mar (2017, Café del Mar Music)
- Cocoon Compilation Q (2017, Cocoon)

=== Remixes ===
- "Deliverance", RY X
- "Something Good", Alt J
- "Through the Yard", Kauf
- "Time Eater", Gold Panda
- "Feeling's Gone", Beacon
- "Go Back" (featuring Damon Albarn), Tony Allen
- "Conversations", Woman's Hour
- "The Fall", Frankie Rosie
- "Free Your Mind", Cut Copy
- "Byby", Lauer
- "No Excuse", Jacques Greene
- "Community", Gold Panda
- "Need Your Love", The Temper Trap
- "Head", Pend Mason
- "Perspective", Adana Twins
