= Yukidori Valley =

Valley in Queen Maud Land, Antarctica

Coordinates: 69°14′30″S 39°46′00″E

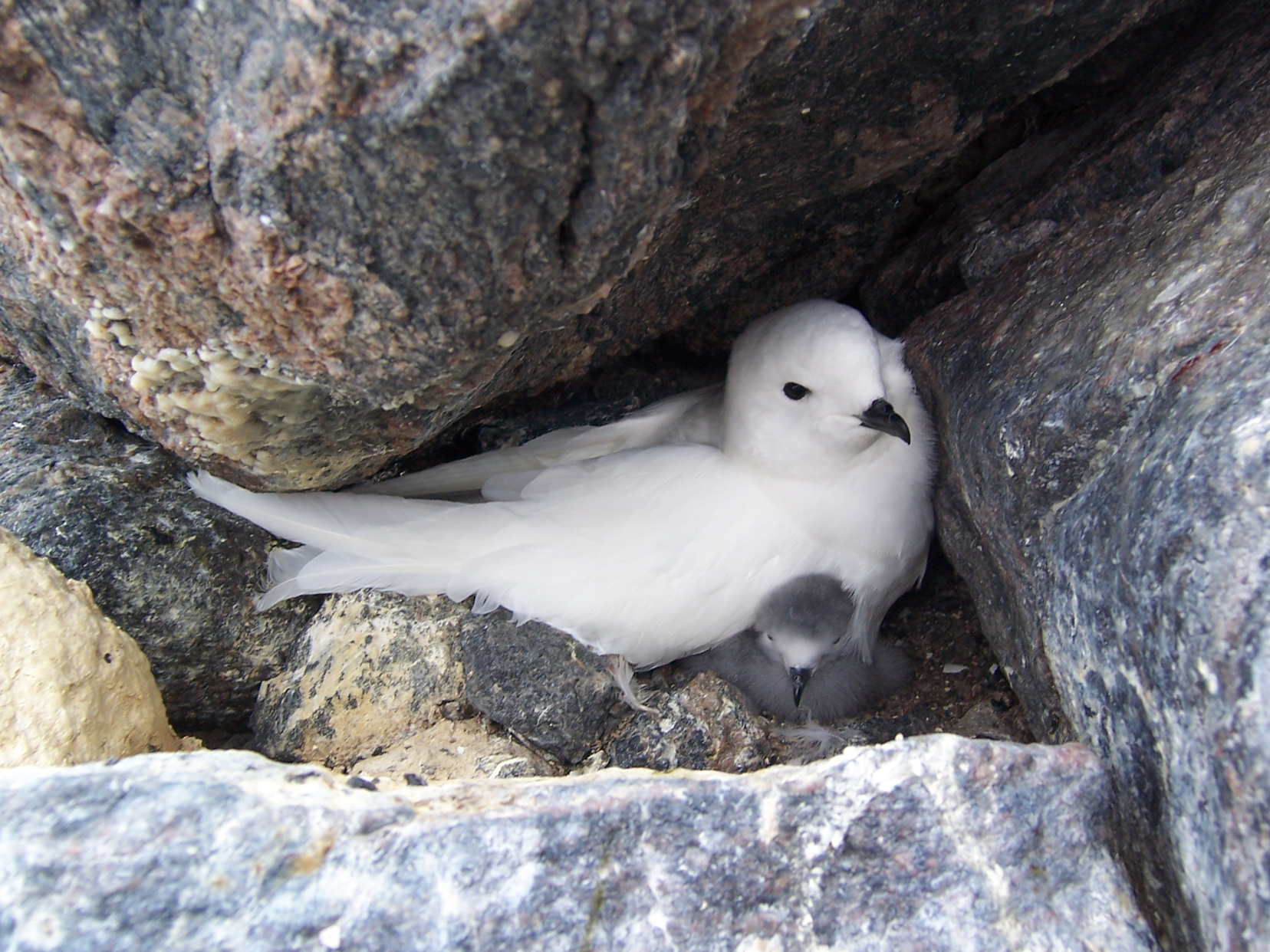
Snow petrels nest in the Yukidori Valley

Yukidori Valley lies in the middle of the Langhovde Hills, on the east coast of Lützow-Holm Bay, in Queen Maud Land of East Antarctica, about 20 km south of Japan's Showa Station. Yukidori is Japanese for “snow petrel”.

== Description ==
The valley is aligned east–west, 2.0-2.5 km long and 1.8 km wide. It contains two lakes, a melt stream flowing from the Antarctic ice cap through Lake Yukidori to the sea at its western end, and has a continental fellfield ecosystem. Plants include several species of mosses and lichens. Birds nesting at the site include several thousand snow petrels as well as a few south polar skuas. Four species of free-living mites are present as well as over 60 species of microalgae, including some that are endemic to the valley. The site is protected under the Antarctic Treaty System as Antarctic Specially Protected Area (ASPA) No.141. There is a Japanese research site there.
