= Insides (Fort Romeau album) =

Studio album by Fort Romeau
- Released: 31 March 2015
- Length: 53:22
- Label: Ghostly International
- Producer: Fort Romeau

Fort Romeau chronology
Kingdoms (2012)	Insides (2015)	Beings of Light (2022)

Insides is the second studio album by English DJ and record producer Michael Greene under the pseudonym Fort Romeau. It was released on 31 March 2015 through Ghostly International. It received generally favorable reviews from critics.

== Background ==
Michael Greene is an English DJ and record producer best known as Fort Romeau. Insides is his second studio album, following Kingdoms (2012). He stated, "I really wanted to move away from sampling as the principal methodology and concentrate on composition not only in the traditional sense of melody, harmony and rhythm but also really considering the textural and concrete nature of the sounds." A music video was released for the song "Not a Word", which features New Jackson on vocals.

He later released Frankfurt Versions (2015), which contains remixes of the album's songs by Roman Flügel, Orson Wells, Massimiliano Pagliara, and Tuff City Kids.

== Critical reception ==
Professional ratings
Aggregate scores
Source	Rating
Metacritic	77/100
Review scores
Source	Rating
AllMusic	4/5 stars
Mixmag	4/5 stars
Pitchfork	7.5/10
PopMatters	7/10 stars
Resident Advisor	3.4/5

According to the review aggregator Metacritic, Insides received "generally favorable reviews" based on a weighted average score of 77 out of 100 from 7 critic scores.

Mark Pytlik of Pitchfork stated, "While there are barely any vocal samples to be found here, it's adorned with the kinds of textures and details that had been missing from the wide-eyed Kingdoms." Joseph Burnett of The Quietus commented that "Insides is, at heart, an album infused with the spirit of old-fashioned vintage house." He added, "The beats are insistent and infectious, the synth lines warm and the bass heavy." Heather Phares of AllMusic stated, "Spacy yet grounded, cosmic yet physical, Insides is a satisfying journey and Fort Romeau's finest music yet."

=== Accolades ===
Year-end lists for Insides
Publication	List	Rank	Ref.
DJ Mag	Top 10 Albums of 2015	4	
Mixmag	Top 50 Albums of 2015	30	

== Track listing ==
All tracks are written by Fort Romeau.

Insides track listing
No.	Title	Length
1.	"New Wave"	6:29
2.	"Folle"	6:09
3.	"All I Want"	8:18
4.	"Insides"	6:19
5.	"Not a Word"	6:03
6.	"IKB"	2:09
7.	"Lately"	10:33
8.	"Cloche"	7:18
Total length:		53:22

== Personnel ==
Credits adapted from liner notes.

- Fort Romeau – production, mixing, photography
- New Jackson – guest appearance (5)
- Shuta Shinoda – mixing
- Matt Colton – mastering
