= Mount Heitō =

Flat topped mountain in Antarctica

Mount Heitō (69°16′S 39°49′E) is a flat-topped mountain 495 metres (1,620 ft) high on the southeast end of the Langhovde Hills in Queen Maud Land, Antarctica. It was mapped from surveys and air photos taken by the Japanese Antarctic Research Expedition (JARE), 1957–62, and the name Heitō-zan (flat-top mountain) was approved by JARE Headquarters in 1972. Heitō Glacier is a small glacier draining westward along the south side of the mountain.
