= Langhovde Hills =

Hills in Antarctica

Coordinates: 69°14′S 39°44′E

The Langhovde Hills are an extensive area of bare rocky hills along the eastern shore of Lützow-Holm Bay, in Queen Maud Land, Antarctica. They are located just south of Hovde Bay. They were mapped by Norwegian cartographers from aerial photographs taken by the Lars Christensen Expedition (LCE) in 1936–37, and named descriptively Langhovde ("long knoll"). Many other features were mapped from surveys and air photos by the Japanese Antarctic Research Expedition (JARE) of 1957–62, and subsequently named by JARE Headquarters.

== Nearby features ==
Hamna Bay ("harbor bay") is a sheltered bay named by LCE that indents the coast on the western side of the Langhovde Hills. Hanma Icefall descends into the bay at its south end. Just northwest of Hamna Bay are a pair of coves called the Dokkene Coves ("the docks"). Further north of Hamna, just south of Mount Futago, is Aogōri Bay ("blue ice bay"), named by JARE.

A rocky, U-shaped peninsula extends seaward in finger-like fashion from the west side of the hills. Its southern extremity is called Cape Nakayubi ("middle finger point"), and its western extremity is Cape Koyubi ("little finger point"). Both features were named by JARE, which also named nearby Oyayuni Point ("thumb point") on Oyayubi Island in association with the two.

Yukidori Valley, an Antarctic Specially Protected Area, lies in the middle of the Langhovde Hills. It is a nesting site for a large number of snow petrels; Yukidori is Japanese for snow petrel.

North of this fingerlike peninsula is Fukuro Cove, a 1-nautical-mile (2 km) wide cove encompassing Koke Strand, a beach area featuring a community of mosses measuring 15 by 30 metres (50 by 100 ft). Both were mapped and named by JARE, Fukuro-ura meaning "pouch cove" and Koke-daira meaning "moss strand".

Mount Chōtō, a 350 metres (1,150 ft) mountain, is situated at the north end of the Hills. 0.5 nautical miles (1 km) west of Mount Chōtō, Mizukuguri Cove indents the western shore of the Langhovde Hills. Hovde Bay ("knoll bay") and Langhovde-kita Point mark the north end of the Hills. The point was first surveyed by JARE personnel, and named Langhovde-kita-misaki ("Langhovde north point") because of its location. Langhovde Glacier flows north from the Hills into Hovde Bay.

=== Mountains ===
Named mountains in the Langhovde Hills include:

- Mount Chōtō
- Mount Futago
- Mount Heitō
- Mount Kammuri
- Mount Minami-heito
