= Mount Futago =

Mountain in Antarctica

Mount Futago (69°12′S 39°44′E) is a small mountain with two peaks, the northern one being 240 metres (790 ft) and the southern one 245 metres (800 ft) high, in the northern part of the Langhovde Hills, Queen Maud Land, Antarctica. It was mapped from surveys and air photos by the Japanese Antarctic Research Expedition (JARE), 1957–62. The name Futago-yama (Hutago Yama), meaning "twin mountain," was given by JARE Headquarters in 1972.
