= Overjoy =

- Origin: Jalisco, Mexico and New York City, New York
- Genres: Fringe-pop, psychedelic, psychotropic, experimental, post punk
- Years active: 1996 - present
- Labels: Wisdom Tree, Field Notes, Sweat It Out Music, Night Film, Club Sweat (Aus), Warner Music Australia
- Members: Daniel Atilano, Alexis Moraites, Mettybeats, Lex Famous
- Past members: Dj Hoff, Chris Hoff
- Website: https://www.youtube.com/overjoyofficial

Overjoy is a Paris, France and Los Angeles, California–based band, consisting of singer-songwriter-producer Lex Famous (Alexis Moraites) and beatmaker and multi-instrumentalist Mettybeats (Daniel Atilano)

== Career ==
The outfit of longtime friends unveiled their debut 'Breakfast EP' last year via Sweat It Out. Hailed by Thump for its "feel-good vibrations," the two-track release displayed Overjoy's range in sound design by mixing drums, synths and guitars into their electronic productions. Overjoy's live performances incorporate Vintage Synthesizers, drum machines, Midi-controllers, and electric guitar and vocals by singer-songwriter Lex Famous (Alexis Moraites). Prior to their 2015 debut EP, Overjoy's singles had received worldwide radio attention seeing regular plays from tastemaker stations Triple J, KCRW, and Berlin's Nightflight.

The summer of 2016 saw Overjoy self-releasing their three-track sophomore EP 'Another' with accompanying music videos for each track. In 2017, Overjoy released back to back new singles in "Dragonfly" and "Women", as well as debuting their new live show at Goldenvoice's summer festival Splash House in Palm Springs, Ca. 2018 has the band releases two more new singles in the 1st quarter, "Same" and "Nobody Dances".

In 2018, "Same" went on to receive a coveted slot aboard Apple Music's The Lounge Playlist, this and Spotify helped propel the duo's streams to over five million worldwide, hitting some 110 countries across the world partly because of their partnership with Warner Music Australia via Sweat It Out, based in Sydney, a very important label in the worldwide electronic dance music market - helping already launch the careers of RUFUS DU SOL, Yolanda Be Cool, etc.

2018 saw only one live show in producer Mettybeats hometown of Los Angeles. The band played for a sold out crowd at Hwood Group's The Pepperment Club in West Hollywood, two days after Dave Chappell and Drake headlined the venue. The night turned out to be extra special as a surprise opening set by Bill Withers set the mood for the evening headlined by Overjoy performing fully live with all original members - and co-headlined by Thee Mike B and the Lisbona Sisters.

Additionally, a radio premiere on LA's Morning Becomes Eclectic, hosted by Jason Bentley helped secure the deal for the band in their hometown. Over 100 more spins on 89.9 KCRW in Santa Monica followed helping propel the band even further into the lexicon and on the tongues of music lovers and DJs internationally. Editorial features in Flaunt Magazine and Vice's Noisey also followed.

2019 saw the release of "Sey U Want Me Back" - the band's first release as a duo. It received a primetime slot on West LA's cutting edge dance station FREAKS ONLY FM hosted by DJ and presenter Travis Holcombe, as did the preceding single, "Nobody Dances" both released through InGROOVES' distribution home to labels such as Stones Throw.

In 2020, the duo played at Okeechobee Festival in Okeechobee, Florida. It was a homecoming for singer Lex Famous, and they were on the lineup with Australian friends and label mates Rufus Du Sol and Crooked Colors. The duo played a laid play DJ set. Also on the bill were Mumford & Sons, Vampire Weekend, Ghostland Observatory, GUNNA, Durante, The Phamtoms, Blood Orange, Bob Moses, Moonboots, and Soul Clap.

== Discography ==
Studio EPs

- Breakfast (Sweat It Out Music · 2015)
- Another (Field Notes · 2016)

Singles

- "Monstrous" (Club Sweat · 2014)
- "Stop" (Club Sweat · 2014)
- "Chase The Devil" (Sweat it Out Music · 2014)
- "Like A Wave" (Field Notes · 2015)
- "Dragonfly" (Field Notes · 2017)
- "Women" (Field Notes · 2017)
- "Same" (Field Notes · 2018)
- "Nobody Dances" (Field Notes · 2018)
