= Gen:Lock =

American animated web series

- Title card from a January 2018 teaser video
- Genre: Science fiction; Mecha; Action
- Created by: Gray Haddock
- Voices of: Michael B. Jordan; Dakota Fanning; Golshifteh Farahani; Maisie Williams; Kōichi Yamadera; Asia Kate Dillon; Blaine Gibson; Gray Haddock; Miles Luna; Chad James; Monica Rial; David Tennant
- Opening theme: "Belgrade" performed by Battle Tapes (S1)
- Composers: David Levy (S1); Starr Parodi (S2)
- Country of origin: United States
- No. of seasons: 2
- No. of episodes: 16

Production
- Executive producers: Burnie Burns (S1); Matt Hullum (S1); Gray G. Haddock (S1); Michael B. Jordan; Alana Mayo; Ryan P. Hall (S2); Jordan Levin (S2)
- Running time: 24–32 minutes
- Production companies: Rooster Teeth Studios; Outlier Society Productions

Original release
- Network: Rooster Teeth
- Release: January 26 – March 9, 2019
- Network: HBO Max
- Release: November 4 – December 23, 2021

Gen:Lock (stylized as gen:LOCK) is an American animated science fiction television series created by Gray Haddock and produced by Rooster Teeth. It is set in a dystopian future Earth where an international coalition known as The Polity fights a hostile, autocratic invading force known as The Union. The show follows the gen:LOCK program and its members, who participate in the development and testing of an experimental technology which allows for individuals with unique mental make ups to have their minds uploaded to giant suits of mecha armor called "Holons".

== Cast and characters ==
=== Main cast ===
==== gen:LOCK team ====
- Michael B. Jordan as Julian Chase, a Vanguard pilot and "All-American guy" from Brooklyn. After losing much of his body in the Battle of New York at the start of the war, Julian is recruited into the gen:LOCK program and becomes the first successful Holon pilot. Because his physical body is confined to a preservation tank, he mostly interacts with others through holographic projections or his Holon. As the most experienced pilot, Julian helps Weller form the rest of the team and assumes a leadership role. Julian pilots a Holon with teal markings which is later equipped with thrusters, wings, and propellers mounted on its back, allowing for long-range flight. It is later upgraded with a sleeker and more aerodynamic design. In addition to a rifle for offense, it can launch two large rockets attached to the wings, and missile batteries in both of its forearms. Julian's call sign is "Chaser".
- Maisie Williams as Cameron 'Cammie' MacCloud, a Scottish hacker and the youngest gen:LOCK recruit at 17 years old. Cameron uses a Holon with green markings with a set of flaps on her head that resemble rabbit ears and equipped with two drones that provide near perfect 360 degree awareness of her surroundings and aim assistance. It is equipped with two handguns, and can automatically dispense and position two handgun magazines to its back for quick reloading. Cammie later upgrades her Holon to look like a rabbit with hind-legs and ears that function like satellite dishes, allowing for long-range sensory capabilities. It is the shortest in comparison to the other Holons, but is shown to be the most agile. Cammie's Holon can deploy five drones that are equipped with an antenna system and machine gun turrets. Smaller drones that allow for remote hacking can be deployed. It is equipped with a new set of dual pistols and disk-shaped remote explosive devices. Williams drew comparisons between Cammie and her Game of Thrones character Arya Stark, noting Cammie's naivety is comparable to Arya's at the start of Thrones: she jokingly remarked that Cammie would win in a fight between the two. Cammie's callsign is "Trixx".
- Kōichi Yamadera as Kazu Iida, a transfer from the Japanese military, where he was demoted from the rank of Sergeant to kitchen duty on grounds of insubordination. Kazu uses a Holon with red markings, equipped with dual katana-like swords, and benefits from additional armor in comparison to the other Holons. It is later outfitted with the most armor and is visibly the bulkiest in comparison to the other Holons. The shoulder armor is capable of unfolding to offer more protection to the upper body. Its dual swords have been replaced with a single hooked greatsword with a telescopic handle and blade for ease of storage, along with a compact shotgun to better complement his close-quarter fighting style. Cammie based Kazu's upgraded Holon on a fictional manga he read called RoboShogun. Kazu exclusively speaks Japanese throughout the series, however AR contact lenses with automatic translation, and similar translation software in the Holons allow the team to communicate without issue. Kazu's callsign is "Shogun".
- Golshifteh Farahani as Yasamin 'Yaz' Madrani, an Iranian fighter pilot who, after accidentally getting her family captured and possibly killed by the Union, defected to the Polity. Wary of her intentions, the Polity held her in the Mesa Detention Center until Weller requested she be released to join the gen:LOCK program after Chase, but before the rest of the team. Yaz pilots a Holon with yellow markings equipped with wrist-mounted beam weapons and two submachine guns, later upgraded to a sleeker design with thrusters and a pair of collapsible wings, allowing the short-range flight capability. It is equipped with a pair of new submachine guns and beam weapons that can be fired from her eyes and wrists. Yaz's callsign is "Huma".
- Asia Kate Dillon as Val/entina Romanyszyn, a former Russian covert agent disillusioned by years of fighting a losing war against the Union in Eastern Europe. Initially intent on abandoning the war to live a life of leisure, they are convinced to join gen:LOCK in order to continue helping people. Val/entina is genderfluid, going by the name "Val" when male-presenting and "Valentina" when female-presenting. Val/entina uses a Holon with purple markings and an energy-based sniper rifle for combat. Their Holon is later upgraded with a lighter armor than the others, possessing a retractable cloak that allows for virtual invisibility, and a wrist-mounted grappling hook strong enough to support the Holon's weight. It is equipped with a new sniper rifle and a single-edged short sword for close-quarter combat. Val/entina's callsign is "Wraith". Actress Tatiana Maslany was approached for the role due to her experience playing a trans character on Orphan Black, but turned the role down and insisted the producers cast an actual gender non-conforming actor in the role, which led the team to Dillon.

==== Other main characters ====
- David Tennant as Dr. Rufus Weller, a scientist from the Polity's Experimental Science Unit and creator of the gen:LOCK program.
  - Tennant also voices Caliban a.k.a. 'Cal', Weller's personal AI assistant, whose mind is an early copy of Weller's.
- Dakota Fanning as Miranda Worth, a Strider pilot and Chase's girlfriend prior to the war, conflicted by his return after he was presumed dead for four years. Originally light hearted and cheerful, she becomes battle hardened, battle-weary and scarred in the years after losing Chase. Her callsign is "Tempest".
- Monica Rial as Col. Raquel Marin, the leader of the Vanguard (the Polity's military).
- Blaine Gibson as Robert Sinclair, a Vanguard Specialist selected by Weller for the gen:Lock program. Sinclair was presumed dead after a Union imposter (also voiced by Gibson) attempted to steal a Holon using his identity, but a post-credits scene in Season 1 reveals he survived his attempted abduction and is trying to escape Union territory. In Season 2, it is revealed that Sinclair is the leader of a resistance movement, the Proletariat, and defected from the Polity after discovering their dark secrets and disagreeing with their methods.
- Gray Haddock as Lieutenant Leon August (Season 1), the leader of Miranda's strider unit. Though gen:LOCK compatible, he is too old to safely upload to a Holon without causing brain damage, and thus settles for training the rest of the team. After surviving the Union's attack on the Anvil, Leon returns linked to Sinclair's supposed Holon along with the Polity to help the heroes defeat Nemesis, but at the cost of sustaining brain damage from incompatibility and subsequently going under a coma, eventually dying from his injuries six months later.
- Miles Luna as Miguel 'Migas' Garza, a mecha mechanic and one of Chase's closest friends who bonds with the gen:LOCK team.
- G.K. Bowes as Driana 'Dri' Chase, Julian's sister and aspiring pop idol. Assumed dead in the Battle of New York, she is shown to be alive in "Training Daze".
- Chad James as Jodie Brennan, a strider pilot who has an unspecified relationship with Miranda after Chase's presumed death.
- Michael B. Jordan as Nemesis (Season 1), a mecha controlled by the original mind of Julian Chase that was captured by the Union and was subjected to extreme mental torment due to far exceeding his Uptime and is bent on killing what he sees as his copy. His Holon has four arms with clawed fingertips and is later upgraded with heavier armor, making him appear much bulkier, and is able to control Union Nanotech for offense, defense, and limited self-repair. He also has spider-like legs attached to his back including 4 mechanical tentacles and three thrusters giving him flight capability.
- Angus Sampson as Brother Tate (Season 2), the figurehead of the Union.

=== Minor characters ===
- Lindsay Jones as Simone 'Razzle' Rasmussen (Season 1), a fighter pilot and Julian's former squadmate in the 'Silver Falcons' unit. She was killed in action during the battle against the Union in New York City.
- Shari Belafonte as Roberta Chase, Julian's mother.
- Lara Toner Haddock as Patricia Bartlet-Young, President of the Polity.
- Lawrence Sonntag as ABLE, the Anvil's AI unit and Colonel Raquel Marin's assistant.
- SungWon Cho as Heng Li 'Henry' Wu, a scientist who is kidnapped by the Union and then rescued by the gen:LOCK team. He works for RTASA, which becomes gen:LOCK's new base of operations. SungWon Cho also voices Chris, who is Robert Sinclair's boyfriend.
- Anisha Nagarajan as Dr. Fatima Jha, a scientist working at RTASA and Dr. Weller's ex-wife.
- Matt Hullum (season 1) and Kiff VandenHeuvel (season 2) as Marc Holcroft, the principal investor in the ESU and RTASA, and one of the early collaborators on the gen:LOCK project. In reality, he's a selfish, callous, manipulative sociopath who plays both sides of the Polity and Union for his own ends.

=== Comic characters ===
- General Genji Anno, the prideful leader of the Polity forces in Japan. He has an antagonistic relationship with his former subordinate Kazu due to their contrasting personalities.
- Toshiro Iida, Kazu's father
- Zariku Iida, Kazu's mother
- Sycorax, a treacherous entity (two women and a wyvern) from the game Siege bent on taking over the world. They were once affiliated with Dr. Weller as part of the gen:LOCK project, but were presumed dead when their minds were corrupted and bodies disintegrated in front of him.
- Kayden Cartwright, creator of Siege
- Commander Carlyle, the leader of an invading Union force sent to Osaka. During the Union's and Sycorax's attack, he appears on the screens denouncing the Polity and the people's efforts, declaring destruction and control of Japan.

== Production and release ==
The concept for Gen:LOCK originated in 2017 as a cautionary tale about cultural warfare. It was announced with a brief teaser at RTX Austin 2018. A trailer was shown at New York Comic Con 2018, where it was described as, "grounded science-fiction" in the tradition of mecha anime such as Gundam and Tom Clancy novels but with a look and feel reminiscent of RWBY.

Gray Haddock cited several anime titles as inspirations, including Ghost in the Shell, Gundam, Aldnoah Zero, Kiznaiver, and the writing of Gen Urobuchi.

In May 2018, it was announced that Michael B. Jordan would voice lead character Julian Chase, the news of which accelerated the signings of other voice talents. Gen:Lock is Rooster Teeth Animation's first series that allowed SAG-AFTRA members like Jordan, Dakota Fanning, and David Tennant to be involved. Jordan also serves as executive producer through his production company, Outlier Society Productions. In July 2018, Evan Narcisse joined the writing staff of Gen:LOCK.

For the first four months, the team animated the series without the actors' voices recorded. Haddock performed every voice for the first few episodes himself, hoping his direction would match later.

Initially advertised for release in 2018, the show's final release date of January 26, 2019 was announced at New York Comic Con. It released on Rooster Teeth's FIRST platform. Following a mysterious tweet from Rooster Teeth's Twitter account on December 21, the first episode of the series was broadcast in a surprise screening on the company's live streaming service the next day. On January 9, it was revealed that along with the Volume 6 finale of RWBY, the first two episodes would premiere on the 26th, and that only the first episode would be available for free and all subsequent episodes would be exclusive to Rooster Teeth FIRST members. The remaining six episodes released on a weekly basis.

The first season premiered on TV and aired from August 3, 2019, to September 21, 2019, on Adult Swim's Toonami programming block, with episodes edited down to approximately 23 minutes to fit into a standard time slot. During the period, Gen:LOCK was either the second most viewed Toonami show after Dragon Ball Super, or third after Dr. Stone. Its best performance was Episode 6, which ranked at ninth among all shows on September 7.

At New York Comic Con 2018, Rooster Teeth announced a partnership with DC Comics to publish RWBY and Gen:LOCK comics starting in 2019. The Gen:Lock comic is written by Collin Kelly and Jackson Lanzing, while drawn by Carlo Barbieri.

On October 24, 2019, it was announced that the show had been renewed for a second season set to be released on HBO Max for its first 90 days before it is released on Rooster Teeth for FIRST members. This was confirmed in 2020 by Forbes.

On October 22, 2021, it was revealed that the show's second season would premiere on HBO Max on November 4, and on Rooster Teeth FIRST on March 23, 2022. As of April 1, 2022, all episodes are available on Rooster Teeth FIRST. Animation was handled by Vancouver-based studio Bardel Entertainment.

== Episodes ==
=== Series overview ===
Season	Episodes	Originally released		
Season	Episodes	First released	Last released	Network
Specials	4	January 20, 2018	November 26, 2018	Rooster Teeth
1	8	January 26, 2019	March 9, 2019	Rooster Teeth
2	8	November 4, 2021	December 23, 2021	HBO Max

=== Character reveal teasers ===
Prior to release, Rooster Teeth released four "Character Reveal Teasers." These teasers, set during episode one's four-year time-skip, were framed from the perspective of Dr. Rufus Weller (David Tennant) and his continued phone conversations with Colonel Raquel Marin (Monica Rial), discussing the new recruits for the gen:LOCK program.

No.	Title	Length	Original release date
P1	"Character Reveal Teaser 1"	1:40	January 20, 2018 (final version reuploaded November 23, 2018)
Dr. Weller runs an experimental field trial operation using test subject Julian Chase. Colonel Marin expresses her concerns about the project and is discouraged to learn that Dr. Weller only found six matches. Dr. Weller reassures her that they are just getting started. Note: This teaser was originally released after the credits of the Volume 5 finale of RWBY, prior to the casting of David Tennant so voice actor Ian Russell played the role of Dr. Weller in the first release of the teaser. The piece was redone with David Tennant's voice after he was cast for the role.
P2	"Character Reveal Teaser 2"	1:55	August 9, 2018
While observing another field test, Dr. Weller receives another call from Colonel Marin demanding to know why she has a transfer request from the Mesa Detainment Center. She reports that the Vanguard is strictly running defense against the Union and that they are only slowing them down. Dr. Weller announces he's found another pilot for the program: Yasamin Madrani, an incarcerated Iranian combat pilot with significant military training. Dr. Weller requests that she be released into his custody from the Mesa, prompting Marin to hang up on him.
P3	"Character Reveal Teaser 3"	2:02	September 15, 2018
Colonel Marin admits she is impressed by Yasamin's work with Chase. Dr. Weller expresses misgivings about the new armor sets for the program but is ignored. He then reveals the next two recruits: Cammie MacCloud, a talented Scottish hacker, and Kazu Iida, a former tank driver who was demoted to cook for insubordination. Colonel Marin angrily refuses to approve Dr. Weller's transfer requests, despite his protests that they are "one in a million." Marin reminds him that they would not have to rely on such subpar candidates if they could improve "gen:LOCK compatibility" and orders Dr. Weller to keep looking.
P4	"Character Reveal Teaser 4"	2:36	November 26, 2018
Colonel Marin contacts Dr. Weller to report that the Union is trying to bring down the whole comms network to find him, and that they need to evacuate him and his work to a safe location. Instead, Dr. Weller reports two more candidates: Ukrainian special ops soldier Valentina Romanyszyn and Vanguard ranger Robert Sinclair. Despite the fact that the integrity of the network is close to being compromised, Dr. Weller refuses to evacuate until Colonel Marin approves the rest of the recruits for transfer. Marin reluctantly complies and orders him to meet her at the Anvil, along with the new recruits. Just as she hangs up, Weller receives a notification that the call was intercepted.

=== Season 1 (2019) ===
No. overall	No. in season	Title	Directed by	Written by	Length	Original release date
1	1	"The Pilot"	Gray G. Haddock	Gray G. Haddock	32:07	January 26, 2019 (premiered December 22, 2018)
In 2068, after Vanguard pilot Julian Chase holographically introduces his family to his girlfriend and fellow soldier Miranda Worth, the Union begins its attack on New York, leading both to be dispatched with the rest of the Vanguard forces. Despite their efforts, New York is lost to the Union, and Chase is seemingly killed in a crash. Four years later, a battle-hardened and still grieving Miranda is ordered by Colonel Raquel Marin to meet Dr. Rufus Weller and Yasamin Madrani from the Polity's Experimental Science Unit, who are moving their headquarters into the Anvil. Miranda, along with Chase's former squadmates Unit Leader Leon August and tank pilot Jodie Brennan, are dispatched to pick up some people on the underground railroad but face a Union ambush. Just when Miranda is about to give up hope, she hears Chase's voice over the radio and witnesses two humanoid mechs enter the battle and single-handedly drive back the Union forces. At the debriefing session, the suspicious pilots demand to know who the mechs were. Marin explains the ambush muddled their plans on how to reveal the truth of the Experimental Science Unit, and an apparently still-alive Chase proceeds to materialize in front of the crowd.
2	2	"There's Always Tomorrow"	Gray G. Haddock	Gray G. Haddock	26:16	January 26, 2019
Chase, Dr. Weller, and Colonel Marin explain the situation to the shocked soldiers: at the ESU Dr. Weller developed new mech technology called "Holons," controlled by a human mind digitized into a computer interface. The system requires very specific candidates in order to achieve what is referred to as "gen:LOCK," with Chase and Madrani being the first two identified. Chase was recovered alive by the ESU and can control his mechs remotely as though they are his own body, and can interact with others via an augmented reality projection he can materialize anywhere nearby. Miguel 'Migas' Garza, one of Chase's friends, visits him in his Holon tank, learning the full extent of Chase's injuries: he lost all of his limbs save for his left arm, and has to be constantly connected to a life support system. He cannot have his limbs regenerated due to the Union's nanotechnology that attacked him, which ironically also kept him alive: until they can develop the technology to remove them, he has to stay confined to the tank. The next day, the other four gen:LOCK candidates arrive: Cammie MacCloud, Kazu Iida, Valentina Romanyszyn, and Robert Sinclair. Chase attempts to talk to Miranda, who angrily rebuffs him for keeping her in the dark for the past four years. Before the recruits can use the holons, Sinclair is revealed to be a Union imposter who replaced the real Sinclair. He kills the guards sent to contain him and takes Dr. Weller hostage. He demands that Weller upload him into one of the mechs or he will release the nano-tech on the base. Dr. Weller complies, but because the imposter Sinclair is not gen:LOCK compatible he is immediately killed while trying to use the Holon unit.
3	3	"Second Birthday"	Gray G. Haddock	Gray G. Haddock	25:05	February 2, 2019
The recruits are reluctant to continue participating in the gen:LOCK program after witnessing what happened to the imposter Sinclair, further insisting that they were misled as to what the program was for: Valentina, in particular, had retired from active combat and was told the program was a science experiment. Dr. Weller convinces them to at least try the Holon units, and they manage to be uploaded. Afterwards they go to the training ground, where a capture the flag is played opposite Leon, Jodie, and Miranda piloting tanks. None of the recruits fare very well, but Chase shows off the full capabilities of the Holon units by winning easily. A fleet of carrier vehicles carrying injured refugees from the front lines arrives right by where the recruits are training, much to their horror and Dr. Weller's secret strategy. Dr. Weller explains that he created gen:LOCK as a potential solution to the culture war, hopefully bridging divisions between sides and helping them come to an understanding, but the military weaponized it. He tells the recruits that even so, perhaps the six of them can usher in a new way of fighting the war if they all work together to support the military's efforts, be it in battle or through rescue missions. The recruits all agree to continue with the program.
4	4	"Training Daze"	Gray G. Haddock	Gray G. Haddock & Kerry Shawcross	24:19	February 9, 2019
Training for the gen:LOCK program continues, while also revealing that Leon is compatible, but was kept out of the program for his own safety, as he is above the safe age range for upload. Though the recruits show progress, they have a difficult time forming a bond as a team. Chase talks to Miranda, apologizing for not reaching out to her, explaining he knew with his situation that there was a chance he would die on her again before they could be reunited, and she hesitantly raises the possibility of them starting over. Migas lets Cammie know she can overhaul the endoskeleton of the Holon units for a better center of gravity and hints that he's working on some other design modifications. Exhausted from training, the group takes a break in the Ether, a virtual reality hub for recreation. Before they can do anything, however, the Ether starts to glitch. Unbeknownst to Chase, his sister Driana (who he assumed was lost in New York) is also in the Ether, and she spots him just before it shuts down. The Holons are dispatched to Dallas's Data Center for the Ether, which the Union is trying to take down. They manage to defeat several of the Union's tanks, and the grunts are able to secure the data center, but the group is confronted by a giant Union mech - that Dr. Weller and Colonel Marin seem familiar with - that ambushes Cammie and severely damages her Holon, leaving her unable to fight but still alive. The rest of the gen:LOCK team manage to force the mech to retreat and Yaz helps Cammie by mind-sharing with her Holon unit.
5	5	"The Best Defense"	Gray G. Haddock	Gray G. Haddock	23:54	February 16, 2019
The team continues training, despite Cammie's trauma and eventual frustration leading her to have a psychotic episode during a sparring match with Kazu. The team tries to cheer her up, assuring they will support her in their next fight. Colonel Marin briefs the gen:LOCK team and the Vanguard pilots about a mission to a Union manufacturing base in Atlanta, despite Dr. Weller's concerns about dispatching them so quickly. The team is given additional upgrades by Dr. Weller (a sword for Kazu, a new rifle for Valentina, wrist-mounted lasers for Yasamin, and targeting drones for Cammie), while Migas reveals to Chase he upgraded his Holon to include wings for aerial combat, to Chase's delight. The mission is briefly complicated by the arrival of some Polity scientists taken hostage by the Union. The gen:LOCK team successfully rescues the scientists and destroys the base, but their exit is blocked by the return of the Union mech, which strangely recognizes Miranda and speaks in Chase's voice before targeting him specifically. After a vicious fight, the mech escapes, leaving Chase confused.
6	6	"The Only Me I Know"	Gray G. Haddock	Gray G. Haddock	25:33	February 23, 2019
The Vanguard is left reeling by the encounter with the Union mech, who to their knowledge is another Chase. Chase tries to talk to Miranda, who is unable to accept the idea that he might not be "her" Chase. Upon returning to the Anvil, Chase confronts Dr. Weller about the mech: Weller admits that the mech is another instance of Chase's brain, his "Nemesis." Contrary to what he had been told, the program had been making back-ups of his mind since the start of the program, uploading copies into one while the other would be deployed into the field. The Union became aware of the gen:LOCK program and ambushed Chase on one of his missions, capturing him and his Holon unit. With no other option, the ESU downloaded the backup into Chase's real body and ended the practice of copying pilots for the rest of the program. Soon after Chase learns all of this, the Union launches an attack on the Anvil spearheaded by the same giant Behemoth mech that attacked New York alongside the Nemesis Chase, who angrily demands that they "kill the copy" and that the Union promised they could return him to his body. The Vanguard's Chase quickly attacks the Nemesis, signaling the start of the battle. The Holon units are dispatched alongside the tank pilots to fight the Union. The Union's droids breach the Anvil in a bid for the gen:LOCK pilots, forcing Kazu, Yaz, Cammie, and Valentina to return to the base so they can escape on a transport with Dr. Weller's android unit Caliban, who is ordered to use the Omega Protocol. In order to buy them more time, Weller sacrifices himself by blowing up the lab with several Union soldiers inside of it. The gen:LOCK units manage to successfully escape on a transport with the help of Migas, and the Anvil is able to down the Behemoth. Unfortunately, this results in the release of a massive nanotech cloud that quickly overtakes the battlefield and the entire base with most of the Vanguard's personnel inside. As Chase loses contact the control center and the ground forces, he goes after the rest of his team.
7	7	"It Never Rains..."	Gray G. Haddock	Story by : Gray G. Haddock; Written by : Gray G. Haddock & Jason Weight	24:32	March 2, 2019
On the run from the Union, the gen:LOCK team deals with the aftermath of the loss of the Anvil and presumably the entire Vanguard. Chase gets into his Holon and patrols, only to hear Nemesis mocking him for no longer being a real human. Union drones soon ambush the group, forcing them to flee. Cammie realizes Nemesis is tracking them because he's still connected to the GL network, and so they cannot use their Holons for the time being. As they contemplate their next move, Caliban initiates the Omega Protocol and starts speaking in Dr. Weller's voice: he delivers a message from Weller, who reveals Caliban is one of the earliest gen:LOCK experiments, possessing an early copy of his neural pattern and everything Dr. Weller knew for gen:LOCK. Caliban then reveals the gen:LOCK program's next destination was the Rogue Technology Aeronautics and Space Administration (RTASA) administration facility for further research and development. Upon arriving at RTASA, one of the scientists rescued in Atlanta, Dr. Henry Wu, introduces the crew to Dr. Fatima Jha, Dr. Weller's ex-wife and one of the earlier collaborators on gen:LOCK, who in turn brings in Marc Holcroft, one of the principal investors in the ESU and RTASA. Holcroft agrees to allow them to stay at RTASA and fix their Holons in exchange for the capture or destruction of Nemesis's Holon. Cammie leads the repairs, and upgrades the armor to give the Holons unique appearances, weapons, and abilities: Yaz is given wings similar to Chase's, Val/entina's is designed to resemble them, Kazu's is based on his favorite manga RoboShogun, and Cammie's is designed to look like a rabbit. Chase upgrades his holographic appearance with the gen:LOCK uniform, accepting the group as his new team.
8	8	"Identity Crisis"	Gray G. Haddock	Story by : Gray G. Haddock; Written by : Gray G. Haddock, Evan Narcisse & Jason Weight	31:57	March 9, 2019
While preparing for their next skirmish, the gen:LOCK team receives a transmission from Migas, who reveals the Anvil and everyone inside is safe: the late Dr. Weller had figured out Union sympathizers were given a chip that could broadcast a signal to nanotech so that it would not affect them and manufactured a copy for the Vanguard that was put into effect when the Behemoth's nanotech attacked. He then reports that the Union is making another move in Chicago, and needs the gen:LOCK team's help. The team touches down at a pier in the South Side to draw Nemesis to them: after taking out some Union forces they are horrified to realize Nemesis has been upgraded with flight capabilities and nanotech that can repair any damage. The team uses mindshare to get an edge on Nemesis, but when this does not completely work they decide to all mindshare at once. When the team is forced to perform the periodic download back to their bodies, Chase chooses to stay in his Holon to buy them time, even if the excessive "uptime" will leave him unable to return to his body. Nemesis and Chase continue their fight, but when Nemesis realizes how important the team is to Chase he heads to where their real bodies are in front of the Museum of Science and Industry. Before he can attack them, however, he is ambushed by Miranda and Jodie in their tanks, and Leon using the Holon intended for Sinclair, despite it being unsafe for him to do so. Chase realizes without the limits of uptime he can mod himself and overclock his Holon without any consequences, and continues his fight with Nemesis until the others are able to upload back into their Holons. The entire gen:LOCK team engages in mindshare, using their combined skills to disable Nemesis's nanotech and damage him beyond repair. Before Chase destroys him for good, Nemesis hints that he was a mere copy of the real Chase's brain, and that the Union made many more. With the battle over Leon tries to download back into his body, however as it was unsafe for him to upload in the first place, the download malfunctions, leaving him in a coma that they cannot confirm he will ever get out of. Colonel Marin congratulates the team on helping them win the battle and offers them a chance to return to the Anvil. Chase has a talk with Miranda, who sadly remarks that the people they were four years ago died in the Battle of New York, but tells Chase not to be a stranger and that perhaps someday they can try things again. The gen:LOCK team decides to move their base of operations to RTASA, with Migas serving as their chief engineer and liaison to the Vanguard, and Leon moving there to aid in his recovery. In a post-credits scene, the real Robert Sinclair is revealed to be alive. His actions and appearance indicate that he seemingly escaped his captors and is now trying to find his way out while disguised as one of the Union soldiers patrolling an unknown Union-controlled city during curfew.

=== Season 2 (2021) ===
No. overall	No. in season	Title	Directed by	Written by	Length	Original release date
9	1	"When the Leaves Began to Turn"	Emi Yonemura	Daniel Dominguez	27:03	November 4, 2021
Using an army of Nemesii, the Union overtook most of the continental United States, and keep on approaching the Polity's headquarters in Los Angeles. Once they manage to attack the Polity, an army of Holons drive them away, leading the gen:LOCK crew to wonder who was piloting them. After Cammie hacks into Caliban and enters it with Chase, the memories of Doctor Weller inside reveal to them that 20 days prior to the Battle of New York, the Polity had struck first.
10	2	"The First Strike"	George Gipson	Maasai Singleton	25:03	November 11, 2021
In a flashback to 2068, Roberta and Driana Chase are saved from the attack on New York because the mother had a Union card and proceed to take shelter in a church. Once Driana witnesses a priest perform a ritual where six zealots are sacrificed by nanotechnology, which is the Union's "Omnifaith" promising a virtual paradise for the disintegrated, she revolts against the Union and leaves. At the same time, at the Union capital Babylon, Yaz argues with her parents who want to perform the nanotech "Ascension" on themselves, and joins an anti-Union resistance. Right as Yaz's group approach the sacred Kabaa to bomb it, Polity jets arrive to do so. The following day, Union leader Brother Tate gives an announcement concerning the recent attack on the Kabaa, calling out the resistance and showing Yaz's parents going through the ascension. The hideout of Yaz's group is raided, with her escaping but falling onto the Euphrates after being shot. Two years later, Chase's mind that was hijacked by the Union has a digital reunion with his mother. Brother Tate arrives, explains about the Omnifaith and how the Ascension could help him overcome his glitching and pain and get a physical body back. Chase is fearful, but Roberta claims he could then live forever, pain free, and sacrifices herself to the nanotech, convincing her son to go through the Ascension. But the result of the process is the creation of Nemesis.
11	3	"Buried Pain Grows Poison Trees"	Shaun O'Neil	Evan Narcisse	25:42	November 18, 2021
12	4	"Together. Together."	Shaun O'Neil	Kristle Peluso	25:13	November 25, 2021
13	5	"The Grand Guignol"	Emi Yonemura	Maasai Singleton	26:10	December 2, 2021
14	6	"The Third Way"	George Gipson	Gavin Hignight	24:58	December 9, 2021
15	7	"Twilight"	Shaun O'Neil	Evan Narcisse and Kristle Peluso	24:16	December 16, 2021
16	8	"Touch What's in Front of You"	Emi Yonemura	Daniel Dominguez	31:00	December 23, 2021

== Reception ==
=== Season 1 ===
Reviews for season 1 of Gen:LOCK were largely positive. Critics praised the series as a clear step forward for the company behind Red vs. Blue and RWBY, highlighting the animation quality and the performances of the lead cast, as well as sharp dialogue by writers Gray Haddock and Evan Narcisse. The series' use of action and spectacle, while praised for its quality, was criticized as taking precedence over storytelling, with Comic Book Resources' Reuben Baron noting it made the series feel unfocused. Writing for Inverse, Eric Francisco observed that at least for the first five episodes the series lacked a clear antagonist which made the stakes of the story difficult to perceive, but overall praised the series as a much more mature outing for Rooster Teeth than RWBY. Austen Goslin from Polygon observed that the series was at its strongest when the characters were the focus and that the fight sequences, though well-choreographed, took time away from those interactions. However, Goslin conceded that the series was a strong addition to the mecha genre.

Mike Toole of Anime News Network offered a more mixed opinion after Season 1's conclusion. Toole praised the show's casting and use of classic science fiction tropes, but noted that despite enough material to keep audiences engaged the first season lacked a truly compelling conflict to drive the story. Toole expressed that a second season would require a story that matched the ambition of the series' characters and core concept in order for it to become a truly great show. "Until then, gen:LOCK feels just a little bit like a prototype."

Fan reaction to Gen:LOCK prior to release was largely skeptical: potential viewers found the initial trailers underwhelming due to a lack of information on what the series was about, and many expressed fatigue with the show's marketing in the months leading up to release. Some mecha anime fans found the concepts unoriginal, with an opinion piece published on Forbes a few days before the premiere claiming that the designs were generic and encouraging viewers to watch something else. The reception was much more positive following release, with several of the more skeptical fans admitting the first episode was all it took to win them over.

Gen:LOCK was nominated for best animated series at 9th Streamy Awards.

=== Season 2 ===
Mark Millen of CBR reviewed the first episode of the show's second season, saying it keeps the spirit of the series intact, even with a different writing crew, and further described the show as a "distinctive animated experience" which has "mental illness, trauma recovery, technological intimacy and identity" at its center. Cassandra Feltus of Black Girl Nerds said that fans would enjoy the second season. She praised the characters for having distinct personalities, who then have to deal with their trauma. Feltus also raised the argument that the series is an introduction to the world of anime due to its inspirations like Ghost in the Shell. Feltus praised the show's design calling the second season "as entertaining and compelling as its first" and was amazed by the action sequences.

== Related media ==
A tie-in comic book series was originally announced by DC Comics on July 5, 2019, to be launched digitally in September 2019. Described as "Season 1.5", the series deals with the team heading to Japan to breakup a Union blockade. The series was published digitally for 14 chapters, which were eventually collected in trade paperback form. In advance of the trade paperback's release, a series of 7 single-issue print comics had been planned. Issue 7 was reportedly cancelled by the publisher;

On October 6, 2020, a novel based on the series called "gen:Lock: Storm Warning" was released, written by Melissa Scott.

In July 2021, Paladins had a Gen:Lock-themed battle pass, including five skins based on characters from the show.
