= Mount Chōtō =

Mountain in Queen Maud Land, Antarctica

Mount Chōtō (69°12′S 39°40′E) is a mountain, 350 metres (1,150 ft) high, surmounting the northern end of the Langhovde Hills on the coast of Queen Maud Land, Antarctica. It was mapped by Norwegian cartographers from air photos taken by the Lars Christensen Expedition, 1936–37. It was surveyed by the Japanese Antarctic Research Expedition, 1957–62, and named "Chōtō-san" (mount long head) in association with the name Langhovde Hills.
