= Gendo Ikari =

Fictional character from Neon Genesis Evangelion

- Neon Genesis Evangelion character
- First appearance: Neon Genesis Evangelion chapter 1: "Angel Attack" (1994)
- Created by: Hideaki Anno; Yoshiyuki Sadamoto
- Voiced by: Japanese: Fumihiko Tachiki; English: Tristan MacAvery (ADV Films / Manga dub); John Swasey (ADV: Director's Cut and Rebuild); Ray Chase (Netflix dub)

In-universe information
- Full name: Gendo Ikari (born Gendo Rokubungi)
- Gender: Male
- Spouse: Yui Ikari
- Significant others: Ritsuko Akagi; Naoko Akagi
- Children: Shinji Ikari (son); Rei Ayanami
- Nationality: Japanese

Gendo Ikari (Japanese: 碇 ゲンドウ, Hepburn: Ikari Gendō) (Note: While all of the English versions romanize his given name as Gendo, Gainax's website romanizes it Gendoh, and some fansites romanize his name as "Gendou", which accords with the traditional romanization of the Japanese katakana.) is a fictional character from the Neon Genesis Evangelion franchise, created by animation studio Gainax. In the original anime series with the same name, Gendo is the supreme commander of the special agency Nerv, which is dedicated to the study and annihilation of Angels, a series of mysterious enemies of humans. Gendo is grief-stricken by the sudden death of his wife Yui, and abandons his son Shinji Ikari to devote himself to a plan named the Human Instrumentality Project. Years later, Gendo asks Shinji to pilot a giant mecha named Evangelion; his pragmatic, cold, and calculating attitude leads him to use any means to achieve his personal goals. He also appears in the franchise's animated feature films and related media, video games, the original net animation Petit Eva: Evangelion@School, the Rebuild of Evangelion films, and the manga adaptation by Yoshiyuki Sadamoto.

The character, who was originally conceived as a modern version of Victor Frankenstein, is inspired by the personal experiences of the series' production staff, reflecting the absent, emotionally detached Japanese father figure. Critics have suggested that Gendo's characterization drew in part on Neon Genesis Evangelion director Hideaki Anno's father; the director also took inspiration from psychoanalytic concepts, especially the Freudian Oedipus complex, for his development.

Critics have negatively received Gendo, describing him as one of the meanest characters and one of the nastiest parents in Japanese animation history. Reviewers criticized his unscrupulous, abusive ways, while others were more appreciative of his role in spin-offs and the manga adaptation of the series. Reviewers appreciated Gendo's role in the theatrical saga Rebuild of Evangelion, and particularly in the film Evangelion: 3.0+1.0 Thrice Upon a Time (2021), and commented positively on his character development. Gendo's typical pose with hands clasped at mouth level has become popular, and has been homaged in other anime and manga. Merchandise featuring the character has also been released.

== Conception ==
Hideaki Anno, the Neon Genesis Evangelion anime series director and main screenwriter, took Gendo's name from a character in a failed Gainax studio project, an anime that was planned before Evangelion but was never produced. For his bachelor name, he chose the word rokubungi (六文儀; lit. "sextant"); for his married name, he chose Ikari (碇; lit. "anchor"), to connect to the names of other characters in Neon Genesis Evangelion, inspired by nautical jargon and ships of the Imperial Japanese Navy. The character was designed by Yoshiyuki Sadamoto, mangaka of the comic version of the series. Gainax was influenced by the British television series UFO and modeled his relationship with Kozo Fuyutsuki on that between Commander Ed Straker and Colonel Alec Freeman from the classic series.

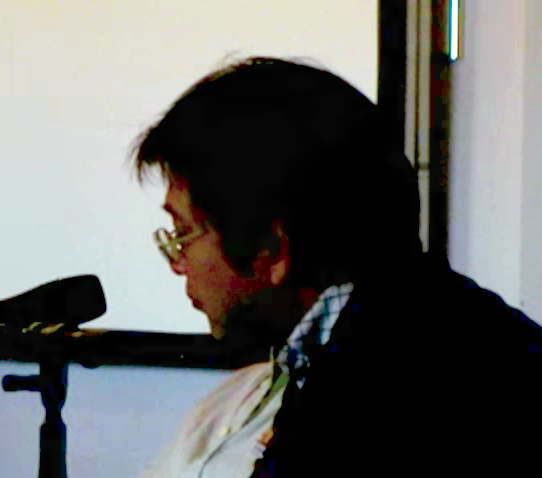
"Since I have also become a family man, I recognize myself in the figure of Gendo. I understand his feelings, such as his fear of not being able to get close to his son" —Yoshiyuki Sadamoto, Neon Genesis Evangelion character designer

The show's production staff chose interpersonal communication, specifically intergenerational communication, as a central theme of the series to reflect on the lack of communication and relational difficulties of the modern world. For the psychology of the character, the protagonist's father who is unable to emotionally communicate with his son, the director took inspiration from his personality, just like all the other characters in the series. The special agency Nerv, in particular, was conceived as a metaphor for Gainax studio; Anno also described Gendo as a representation of his shadow, the dark, unconscious side of an individual's psyche. The director stated he did not conceive Gendo as a concrete father with a blood tie to his son but as a representation of society, adding, "I don't think I projected that much [into him]".

Some fans have suggested that Gendo was partly inspired by Hideaki Anno's relationship with his father. Anno's father injured his left leg with a power saw in a youthful accident, which forced him to wear a prosthesis for the rest of his life. According to Anno himself, his father became emotionally unstable as a result of the accident, so he grew up in a tense family environment, marked by physical and emotional punishment from his father. According to Kazuya Tsurumaki, assistant director of the series:

A lot of families in Japan a generation ago—and perhaps even now—had fathers that were workaholics and never home. They were out of their children's lives. My own father was like that, and I hardly ever got to associate with him until quite recently. I'm the same sort of person as Hideaki Anno. That probably influences the type of anime I create.

In the early design stages of Neon Genesis Evangelion, Gainax decided to portray Gendo as a "mysterious person in behavior and words", a staunch defender of the Instrumentality Project, expressive, tumultuous, akin to a twenty-first-century Dr. Victor Frankenstein. Over time, he would become obsessed with research, justifying any means to achieve his goal to the point of transforming his own body and becoming a digitized human being. His goal, however, would be benevolent, in the belief he could realize a utopian dream capable of bringing true equality among people. In the first episode of the series, Gendo would have called Shinji to fight against an Angel named Raziel, and in the fourth episode, titled "Fourteen years, the first day" (14歳、 始まりの日, 14-sai, hajimari no hi), he would have ignored his son on his birthday, but these ideas were discarded during the show's production. Gainax originally intended that Gendo would not have participated in a survey expedition to Antarctica, as in the final scenario; the original draft had him involved in a mysterious accident that would cause the Dead Sea to evaporate, as revealed in the twentieth episode of the show. In the finale, Gendo's true goals and the true purpose of the Instrumentality Project would be revealed; the ruins of a place called Arqa (アルカ, Aruka), which is never mentioned in the final version, would be revealed. The conclusion originally planned by the staff also included a scene in which Gendo, separating from his son Shinji, would have said "Live!" (生きろ, Ikiro), similarly to the ending of the previous Gainax studio work, Nadia: The Secret of Blue Water.

Further scenarios were suggested during production by animator and screenwriter Mitsuo Iso. In Iso's scenarios, Gendo, after failing to complete Yui's Instrumentality experiment, would isolate a single cell in a failed attempt to clone his wife. Three years later, Gendo would find a baby girl instead, Rei. Iso also proposed that only Gendo would initially be able to touch Rei without being repelled by a force field. In another draft of what would become the twenty-first episode, Gendo would meet Asuka's father. Fuyutsuki would reveal Gendo's secrets to the opposition party, but Ikari would then show Fuyutsuki Arqa and organize a coup d'état with him. In the second half of the series, Commander Ikari would depart Japan, and in his absence, the Japan Strategic Self-Defense Forces would invade Nerv. In one scene, Gendo would have called Rei "Yui", but Rei would have responded by claiming she wasn't his wife, with Gendo weeping on her abdomen. In another draft, Gendo is shot and falls into Lake Ashinoko; in the finale, he would have commanded Eva-06 in a psychological confrontation with Shinji. He then would have merged with Arqa and the Tree of Life along with the twelve final Angels, in a situation similar to the tale of Jack and the Beanstalk. In another Iso's draft Gendo would also have only one eye and found tiles onto which the Arqani would have transcribed their personalities. With a "tortured conscience", Ikari then would have joined his wife in stone form. The commander would have made a pact with Arqa and the Twelve Angels to transform Rei into Yui, in an atmosphere similar to Dororo, metaphorically tasting the forbidden fruit as in the myth of the lost paradise. In Iso's ideas, Gendo alone knew that killing Rei would stop the twelve Angels. Shinji and Gendo would also have been involved in a nuclear explosion. Shinji, after learning of Gendo's death, would have lost his purpose. In another draft, moreover, it would have been the boy the one to kill Gendo.

=== Voice ===
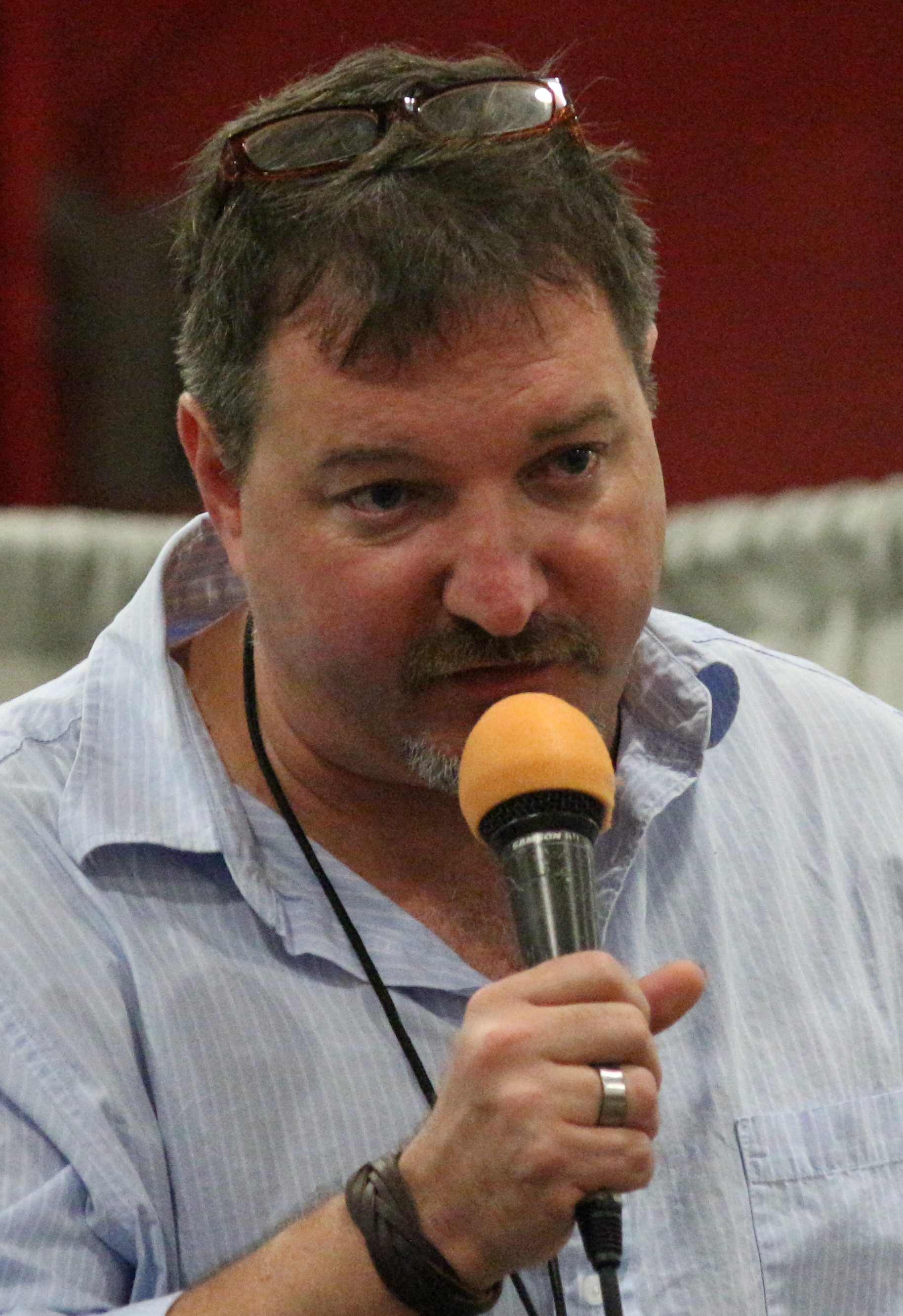
John Swasey voiced Gendo in the director's cut scenes of the original series as well in the Rebuild of Evangelion movies.

Fumihiko Tachiki voiced Gendo in the original series, in the later films, spin-offs, video games and the Rebuild of Evangelion saga. Tachiki found it difficult to empathize with or understand Evangelion and Gendo, and wondered "whether I hated or loved Gendo". Tachiki was confused during the recordings; he failed to frame Gendo's laconic phrases and intentions, and was forced to ask how to recite his lines and interpret a particular phrase. He stated, "Honestly, when I first started the television series, I'd only just been exposed to the story. It turned out to be tough; I really agonized about how to make the character come across. I can't say it was a pleasant experience". During recording sessions for the original series and the 1997 feature films, he received support from the staff, and Hideaki Anno and the sound director coached and directed him.

Tachiki encountered similar difficulties for the Rebuild of Evangelion saga, and in particular for the third installment, Evangelion: 3.0 You Can (Not) Redo (2012), which was dubbed almost twenty years after the original series. However, Tachiki, while disconcerted by the futuristic setting and plot changes, was helped by his accumulated experience and greater maturity, due to which he acted more frankly and serenely than in the classic series. For the last installment of the saga, Evangelion: 3.0+1.0 Thrice Upon a Time (2021), Tachiki remained surprised by the script, having to go over his lines several times while looking at the still-incomplete drawings of the film. The first voice-recording sessions focused on his dialogue with Fututsuki, with a colleague older than him, which allowed him to relax more during the recording phase. Despite the changes in Gendo's characterization, the staff did not ask Tachiki to dub him emotionally but naturally, without passion and particular tension. Even in the case of Thrice Upon a Time, he had difficulties, given the change of direction. Tachiki's throat hurt while he was recording a complicated scene in which he shouts Yui's name and had to raise his voice; the production asked him to convey all his emotions and feelings at that moment.

In the North American A.D. Vision version of the series and the 1997 films, Gendo is voiced by Tristan MacAvery, except for additional parts in the director's cut and Rebuild, in which he is played by John Swasey. MacAvery had difficulties when dubbing the last two episodes, which are entirely set in Shinji's inner world; "I had no idea what was going on [in the last two episodes]. I had to figure how I should read the part, flat or philosophical". MacAvery and the other actors said there was nothing wrong with the English translation since the Japanese original was "incomprehensible". Ray Chase voiced Gendo in the Netflix dub, while Swasey reprised his role for the Amazon Prime Video Rebuild dub. Ray Chase described voicing Gendo as a unique experience, recalling that the Evangelion production staff closely supervised the English voice acting. According to Chase, the staff repeatedly re-recorded every line until it met their expectations, ensuring that the English performance reflected the creators' intentions.

== Appearances ==
=== Neon Genesis Evangelion ===
Gendo Ikari, originally named Gendo Rokubungi, is presented at the beginning of the series as a cold man head of the special agency Nerv, deputy to the annihilation of the Angels. His parents are never named in the series, and no details are given about his childhood and adolescence. His past is explored in the twenty-first episode of the series, "He was aware that he was still a child". In 1999, when he is thirty-two years old, Gendo is arrested and designates Professor Kozo Fuyutsuki, a lecturer at Kyoto University, as his guarantor. After being exonerated at the hands of the professor, Gendo becomes romantically involved with Yui Ikari, a brilliant researcher and student of Fuyutsuki. The professor does not approve of Gendo's actions, suspecting ulterior motives on his part. Yui is linked to a secret organization named Seele, and rumors say Gendo's only interest is to get close to Seele and exploit Yui's talent. To secretly carry out Seele's plans, Gendo participates in a research group known as the Katsuragi expedition, which leaves for Antarctica to conduct experiments regarding a mechanism known as the S² engine. On September 12, 2000, Gendo leaves Antarctica with other members of the group, including a man named Lorenz Keel, head of Seele. The next day, in an apparent coincidence, a gigantic natural disaster known as the Second Impact occurs. After marrying Yui, Gendo changes his surname to Ikari and, along with other members of Seele and Professor Fuyutsuki, participates in a United Nations-organized expedition to investigate the Second Impact. A little later, Seele assigns Gendo the role of director of the Laboratory for Artificial Evolution, with the task of directing a secret plan known as Project E.

In 2003, Professor Fuyutsuki collects information about the Second Impact and arrives at the Artificial Evolution Laboratory, threatening the director to make public the truth. Gendo takes him to a bunker below the Laboratory, the headquarters of an organization known as Gehirn, and invites him to collaborate "to build the new history of mankind". After careful consideration, Fuyutsuki accepts the offer. The following year, Gendo attends an experiment to activate an Eva called Unit 01; due to an accident, Yui disappears, and Gendo decides to leave his son Shinji to a guardian. A week after his wife's disappearance, Gendo tells Fuyutsuki about the Human Instrumentality Project, which he describes as "the path to godhood that none have ever succeeded in before". From that moment his goal changes and becomes that of reaching his deceased wife again. In 2010 the Gehirn is disbanded and replaced with the special agency Nerv.

In 2015, after years of silence, Gendo summons Shinji to the city of Tokyo-3 to let him pilot the Eva-01 and face the Angels. He keeps a cold attitude towards his son. Following the battle against the sixth Angel Gaghiel, a man named Ryoji Kaji gives Gendo a small, embryo-like object that is identified as the first Angel Adam in the eighth episode of the series, "Asuka Strikes!". Gendo later implants the embryo in the palm of his right hand. Meanwhile, discrepancies arise between the commander and the Seele, both of which are intent on starting the Human Instrumentality Project. Gendo, unlike the Seele, decides to cause a "forbidden union" between Adam, implanted in his body, and the second Angel Lilith, whose soul is kept inside a girl named Rei Ayanami. After the defeat of the last Angel, Gendo attempts to reunite with Yui, betraying Seele. To implement the plan, he enters the deepest section of the headquarters, Terminal Dogma, with Rei and inserts his right hand into the girl's body so she can absorb Adam's embryo in the movie Neon Genesis Evangelion: The End of Evangelion (1997). Rei, however, betrays Gendo's expectations and joins the second Angel against his will, causing his plans to fail. During Instrumentality, Gendo meets the spirit of his wife and is devoured by a projection of the Eva-01.

=== Rebuild of Evangelion ===
Gendo returns as a primary character in Rebuild of Evangelion and appears in the first installment of the saga, Evangelion: 1.0 You Are (Not) Alone (2007). His character remains virtually identical to that in the anime, summoning Shinji to pilot Evangelion Unit-01. In the movie Evangelion: 2.0 You Can (Not) Advance (2009), the second installment of the Rebuild tetralogy, his relationship with his son appears better than that in the original anime and manga. In the film's opening sequences, Gendo and Shinji visit Yui's grave, despite communication difficulties, and later begin to more sincerely communicate their feelings and spend more time together, building a more affectionate relationship than their animated counterparts. Shinji, in particular, begins to connect with his parent through the nudging and encouragement of Misato Katsuragi and, to an even greater extent, Rei Ayanami, who tries to bring the two closer together by cooking them dinner. Anno originally thought of using a similar idea for the fourth episode of the television series, "Hedgehog's Dilemma", but the proposal was shelved during production. Later in the film, Gendo travels with Fuyutsuki to Seele's Tabgha lunar base, where work is underway on an Evangelion designated Mark.06.

Gendo as portrayed in Evangelion: 3.0+1.0 Thrice Upon a Time

In the following installment, Evangelion: 3.0 You Can (Not) Redo (2012), set fourteen years after the previous one, Gendo continues to pursue his Instrumentality as the commander of the Nerv, apparently reduced to Vice Commander Fuyutsuki and a boy named Kaworu Nagisa. The man also presents a more aged appearance than in the classic series. In the course of the film, Gendo comes into conflict with Wille, a company headed by Misato Katsuragi created to destroy the Nerv, and orders Shinji to pilot the Eva 13, maintaining the same aloof attitude as fourteen years earlier. Throughout the film, Gendo appears beside a briefcase containing an artifact known as the Key of Nebuchadnezzar and bids a final farewell to the members of Seele by manually shutting down the monoliths through which they appear during their meetings. Kaworu also refers to Gendo as the "King of the Lilin", that is, the ruler of humanity.

In the movie Evangelion: 3.0+1.0 Thrice Upon a Time (2021), Gendo, having injected the Key of Nebuchadnezzar into his body, transcends humanity and enters Eva-13 to initiate the Human Instrumentality Project, and accomplish deicide and the Additional Impact, fighting with Eva-01 and Shinji inside it. Unit 01 and Unit 13, defined by Gendo as units of "hope" and "despair" respectively, are tuned and synchronized with each other; Shinji loses the fight and argues with Gendo instead of using force. Gendo speaks to his son, revealing his lonely childhood in which he was fond of the piano and not very sociable until he met his future wife. For a long time, Gendo had a connection with Mari, and at the end of the trial, he resolves his suffering by embracing Shinji and asking him for forgiveness. Eva-01 and Eva-13 inflict themselves with spears, and Gendo and Yui sacrifice themselves to allow their son to continue living, reuniting for one last time.

According to scholar Nicolle Lamerichs, Gendo is "emotionally deepened" in the final Rebuild of Evangelion film. While the narrative initially emphasizes the emotional distance between him and Shinji, it later invites empathy for Gendo, ultimately providing a happy resolution for both characters. In the last two installments of Rebuild, Gendo wears different glasses that cover his eye sockets, an idea that came from Mahiro Maeda, who wanted to give the impression Gendo was falling into darkness. Maeda, considering the eyes as the mirror of an individual's mind, wanted Gendo to have no human perspective and projected Anno onto Gendo during production, wondering what Anno's childhood had been like. Megumi Hayashibara, Rei Ayanami's voice actress, said she sometimes recognized Anno in Gendo's character and sometimes in Shinji's. Anno himself stated he no longer felt as close to Shinji as he once did, identifying more with Gendo. At the beginning of production, assistant director Kazuya Tsurumaki instructed mecha designer Ikuto Yamashita to create a scenario in which Gendo and Shinji would clash for eternity, even after losing their bodies.

=== In other media ===
In a scene from the last episode of the animated series, a parallel universe is presented with a different story than the previous episodes; in the alternative reality, Gendo appears as a normal man who is reading a newspaper in a kitchen, and cohabits with Shinji and his wife Yui. According to his newspaper, Antarctica still exists and no accident occurred at the South Pole. A similar version of events occurs in the manga Shinji Ikari Raising Project. In the original net parody anime Petit Eva: Evangelion@School, Gendo is the principal at a school named Tokyo-3 Municipal academy "Nerv", attended by Shinji, Asuka, Rei, and the other Evangelion characters; he is also portrayed as a less-negative character and as a calm, strict father who act as though he has a crush on Ritsuko but still loves his wife, with whom he has a good relationship.

The manga version, which was written and illustrated by Yoshiyuki Sadamoto, introduces more differences in Gendo's characterization and development. Sadamoto tried to portray Gendo in a more balanced way compared to Hideaki Anno's Gendo; although putting him in a negative light, Sadamoto tried to better explain the reasons for Yui's attraction towards him, emphasizing his stubbornness and representing Fuyutsuki as a rebel. In the manga, Gendo leaves his son with his aunt and uncle, whereas in the animated series the identity of the guardian to whom he entrusts Shinji is not revealed. In the anime, Gendo has Adam's embryo implanted in the palm of his right hand, whereas in Sadamoto's version he swallows it, thus developing the ability to extend an AT Field, a directional force field characteristic of Angels and Evangelion. Unlike the original series, the confrontation with the Angel Bardiel culminates in the death of Toji Suzuhara. Gendo feels no remorse; his attitude arouses the ire of his son, who tries to punch him. He saves Shinji during an attack by the Japanese Self-Defense Forces, telling him he was jealous of him since birth because he suddenly became the center of his wife's attention and affection. Gendo also sees Yui as a divine figure who gave meaning to his life and brought him out of his emotional torpor. In the last chapters, he shoots Dr. Akagi, telling her "I loved you" and is in turn killed by the doctor. Before he dies, he sees Yui again during the Instrumentality, and remembers the moment when he first saw his son; Yui tells him that Shinji is the fruit of their love, and Gendo passes away.

== Characterization ==
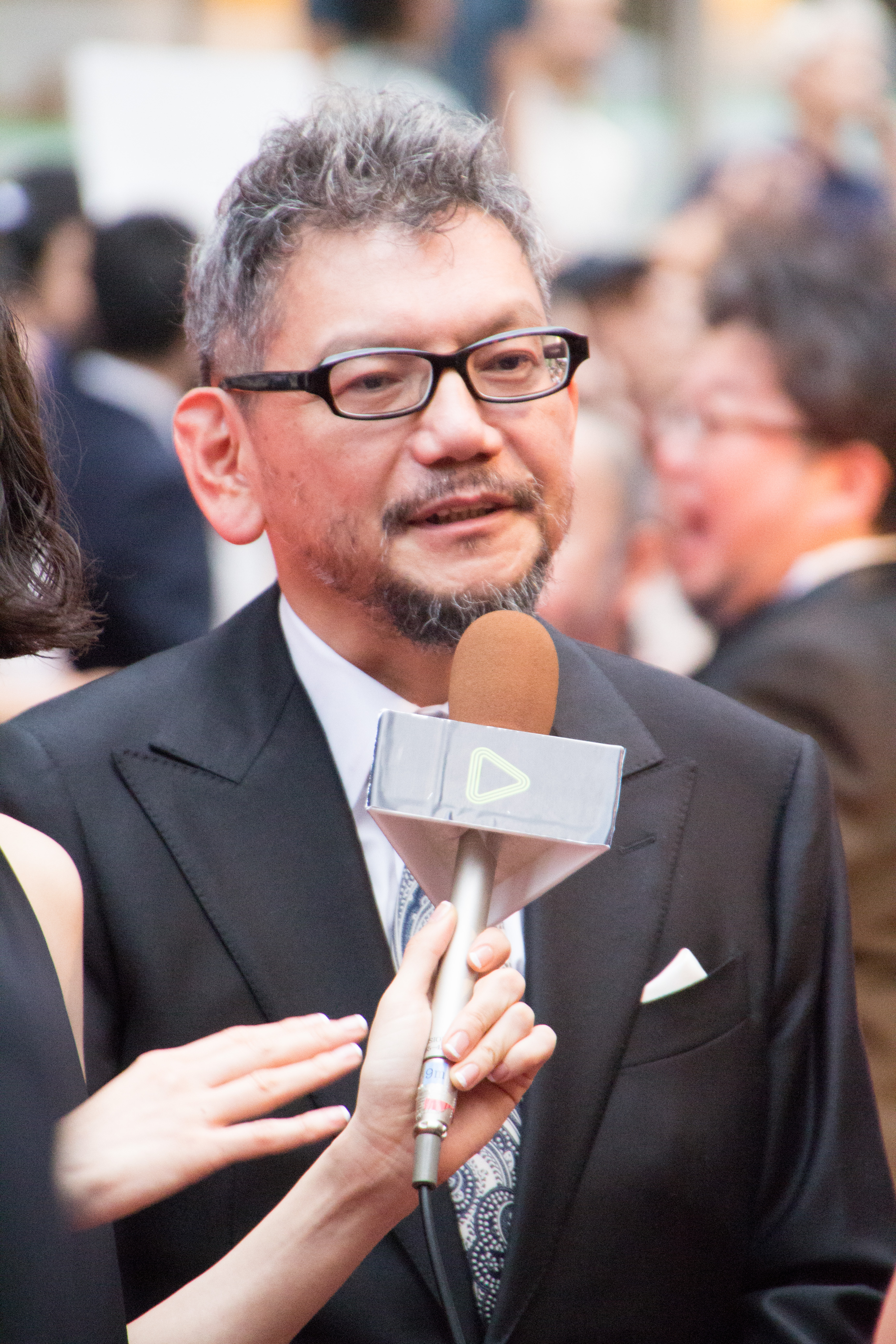
"Gendo is the type of person who can see and think about the welfare of an organization as a whole. In other words, he'd do anything to succeed. He takes drastic and extreme measures, by fair means or foul, or by hook or by crook, in order to accomplish his own purpose. In some ways he's mean, he hardly cares about Shinji" —Hideaki Anno

Gendo Ikari is a mysterious, emotionally closed, austere, determined, calculating, ruthless, and unscrupulous man. His innate pragmatism and his phlegmatic, selfish character, lead him to use any means to achieve his goals, even if it means hurting other people's feelings. The only people who seem to understand his thoughts are the vice-commander of the Nerv, Kozo Fuyutsuki, and Dr. Ritsuko Akagi, who shares his philosophy. Gendo flaunts a detached attitude with his subordinates, keeping calm and cool-headed in all circumstances and sticking to his plans. He is confident in his war strategies; to implement them he often takes the place of the United Nations as if he considered it his right, not hesitating to use Shinji and Ayanami. His Japanese voice actor Fumihiko Tachiki, however, stated, "[Gendo] is not just cold or immoral. I don't know how to articulate it, but I feel that he shows a strength that's unique to humans." To carry out his plans, Gendo uses his subordinate Ryoji Kaji and embarks on a secret affair with Dr. Naoko Akagi, a scientist and researcher, taking advantage of her scientific talents. He does not actually love the woman, since he considers Dr. Akagi a tool for Instrumentality and being able to meet Yui, whom he cannot forget. Naoko, realizing Gendo is exploiting her, commits suicide in 2010, after which he enters into a sexual relationship with her daughter, Ritsuko. Ritsuko also realizes Gendo is using her, saying that from the beginning the man never had any real expectations for her.

Gendo is indifferent to his son's life considering him a mere tool for his plans, but shows an attachment to Rei, to whom he is closer and more intimate. Gendo constantly devotes himself to the Instrumentality Project following his wife's sudden death, trying at all costs to meet her again. In the fifteenth episode of the series, he visits her symbolic tomb with his son, claiming "Yui made me know that something irreplaceable to me". On other occasions, he displays a more human side, and his relationship with Shinji appears to improve; during the battle against the Angel Matarael in "The Day Tokyo-3 Stood Still", he helps his men to manually operate the Evangelion units, while shortly after the defeat of the Angel Sahaquiel in the twelfth episode, he praises Shinji. Gendo disappoints his son's expectations during the battle against the Angel Bardiel in the episode "Ambivalence", in which he has the Evangelion 03 unit destroyed without remorse, wounding and mutilating its pilot, Toji Suzuhara, Shinji's friend. According to Evangelion Chronicle, an official encyclopedia about the series, Gendo's behavior can be interpreted as a "reverse manifestation of affection": not wanting to hurt his son, he turns away from him. A pamphlet for the film The End of Evangelion likens their relationship to Arthur Schopenhauer's porcupine's dilemma. Gendo's path has its climax during Instrumentality, in which he meets Yui again and asks his son's forgiveness just before dying. He is then devoured by Eva-01; according to Yūichirō Oguro, editor of extra materials from the home video editions of the series, the Eva-01 visible in the sequence may be an illusion and the scene may symbolize Gendo's success in becoming one with his wife.

=== Cultural references and themes ===
According to cultural critic Hiroki Azuma, Gendo's uniform is an homage to Leiji Matsumoto's series Space Battleship Yamato, while his pose with joined hands has been compared to that of Gargoyle, the antagonist of Nadia: The Secret of Blue Water. Gendo's motto, "The hands of the clock cannot turn back", is also similar to a phrase from an earlier Gainax work, "If the overflowed water could be poured out again" from GunBuster. Japanese critic Akio Nagatomi compared Gendo to Kōichirō Ōta, also called "Coach", and his son Shinji to Noriko from Gunbuster. Gendo has also been interpreted as a reflection of Shinji and as a representation of paternalism. Critics have interpreted the Nerv as a patriarchal society that is commanded by an austere, dictatorial man who gives unquestionable orders, far from his son. His austere demeanor has been interpreted as a symbol of repression and a reworking of the absent father archetype found in classic mecha anime. Noriko's father is likewise physically absent in Gunbuster. Writer Andrea Fontana compared the series' theme of Oedipal conflict between fathers and sons to other works by director Yoshiyuki Tomino, while Anime News Network's Jonny Lobo compared the conflict between Shinji and Gendo to the world presented by the OVA Megazone 23, in which parental figures are almost absent; according to him, however, Megazone protagonist Shogo Yahagi rebels against the government, the de facto enforcer of patriarchy, rather than an individual like Gendo. It is left to the viewer's sensibilities to decide whether the series supports or critiques the machista masculinity model, attempting to refute the intrinsic value of the patriarchal view.

According to Nicole Veneto from Anime Feminist, Gendo represents an implicit critique of the male otaku, as his inability to form genuine relationships leads him to treat Rei as little more than a doll through whom he can exercise his power. Writer Virginie Nebbia observed that the series' male figures, such as Gendo and Seele, escape from reality by seeking to bring about the end of the world, whereas its maternal figures remain connected to their children. Nebbia also argued that Gendo's affection for Rei is portrayed as unhealthy; she further noted that the theme of the absent father had already appeared in Dear Brother, an anime she considered particularly influential on Hideaki Anno. Gendo's egocentricity has been associated by Japanese psychiatrist Kōji Mizobe with a narcissistic personality disorder. Moreover, U.S. writer Susan J. Napier, noting Angels are "explicitly associated" with Gendo throughout the series, has interpreted the enemies as father figures. Hideaki Anno himself described Gendo as a metaphor for the "system" and the limits imposed by society; he intentionally depicted Gendo and the Angels as "amorphous" entities, since society and the concept of the enemy are undefined for him. Writer Mark MacWilliams also described the series as a portrait of childhood loneliness in a broken society where the father is constantly working, comparing this depiction to the Japanese family context and children growing up in the 1990s before the collapse of the speculative bubble.

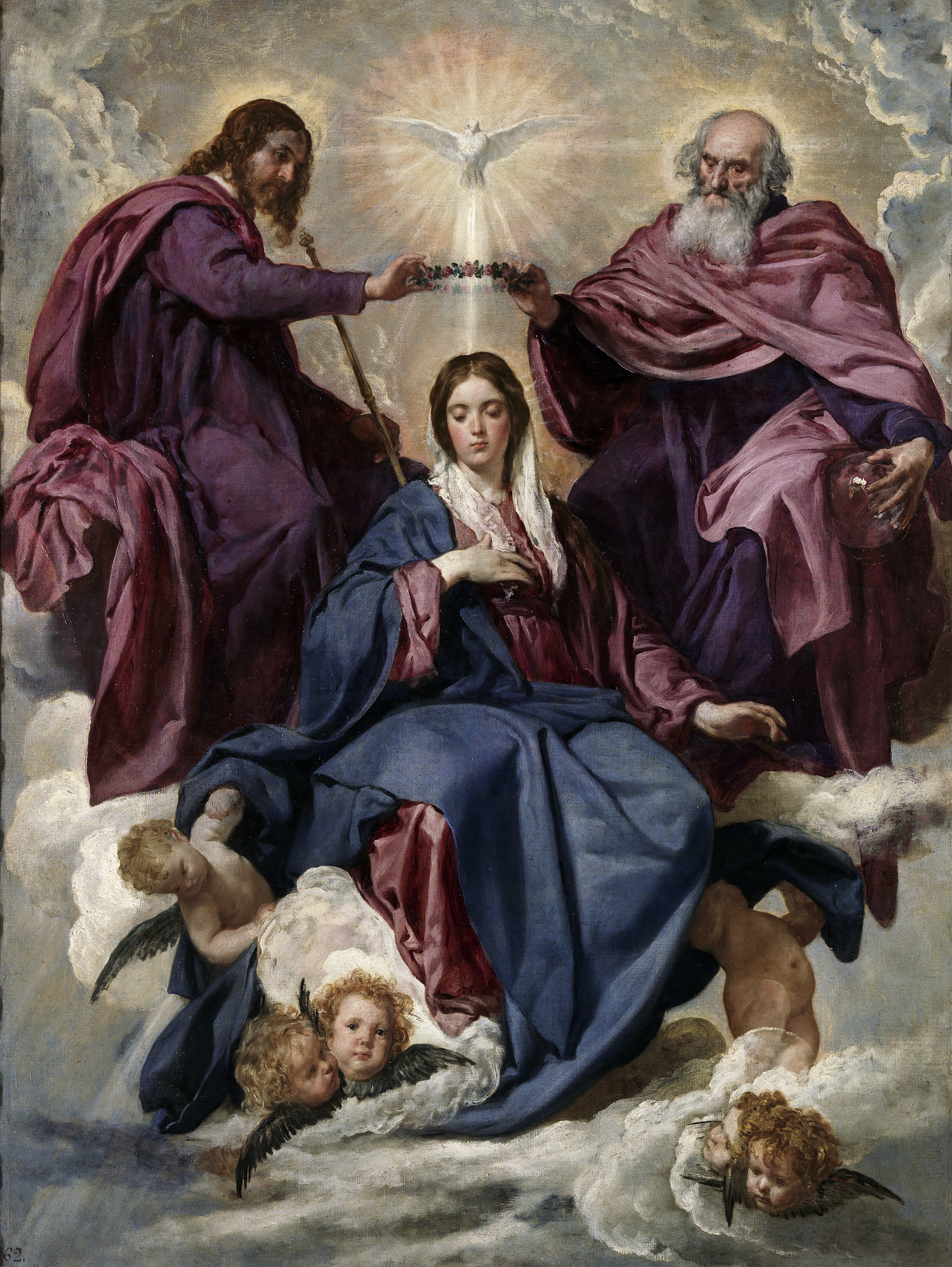
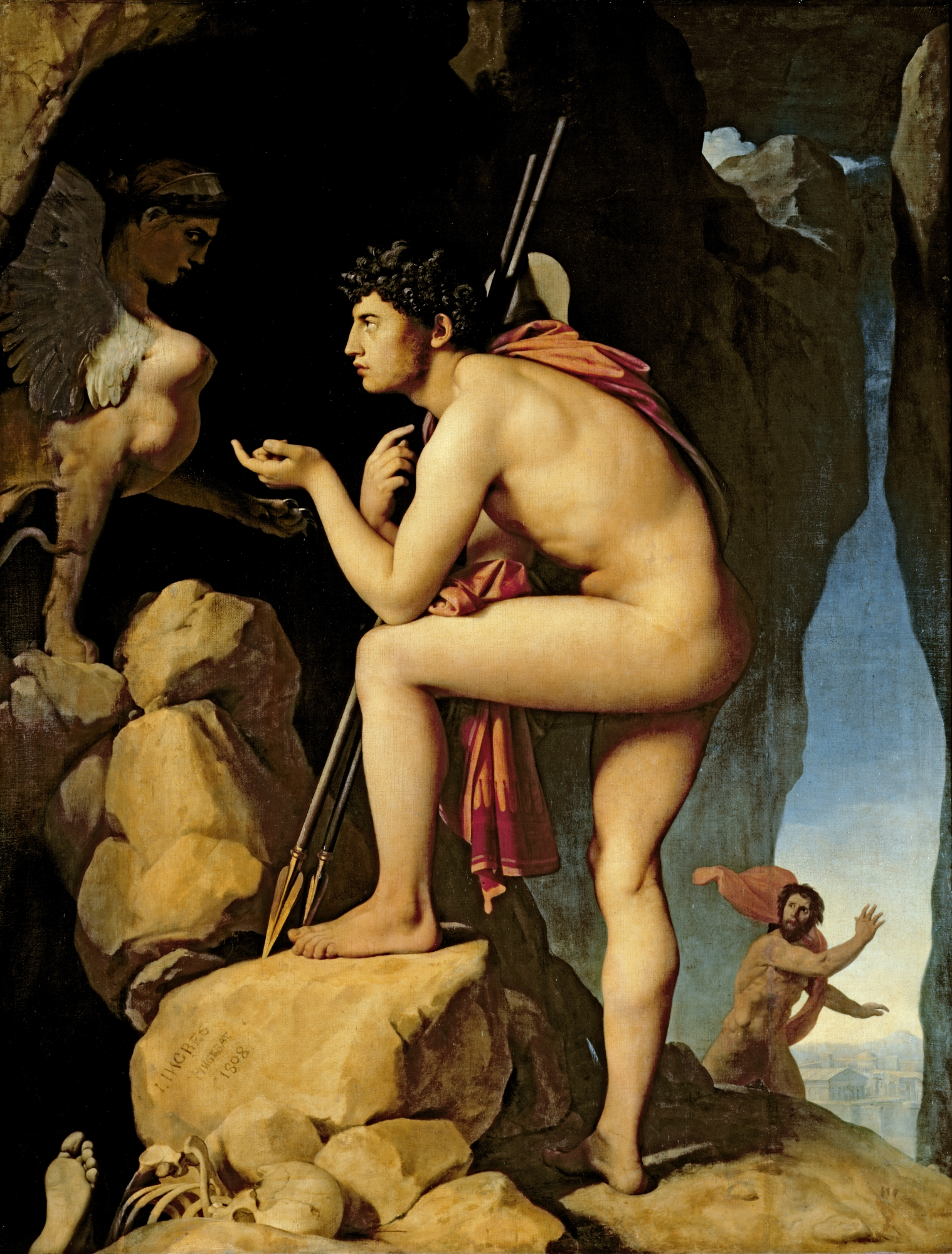
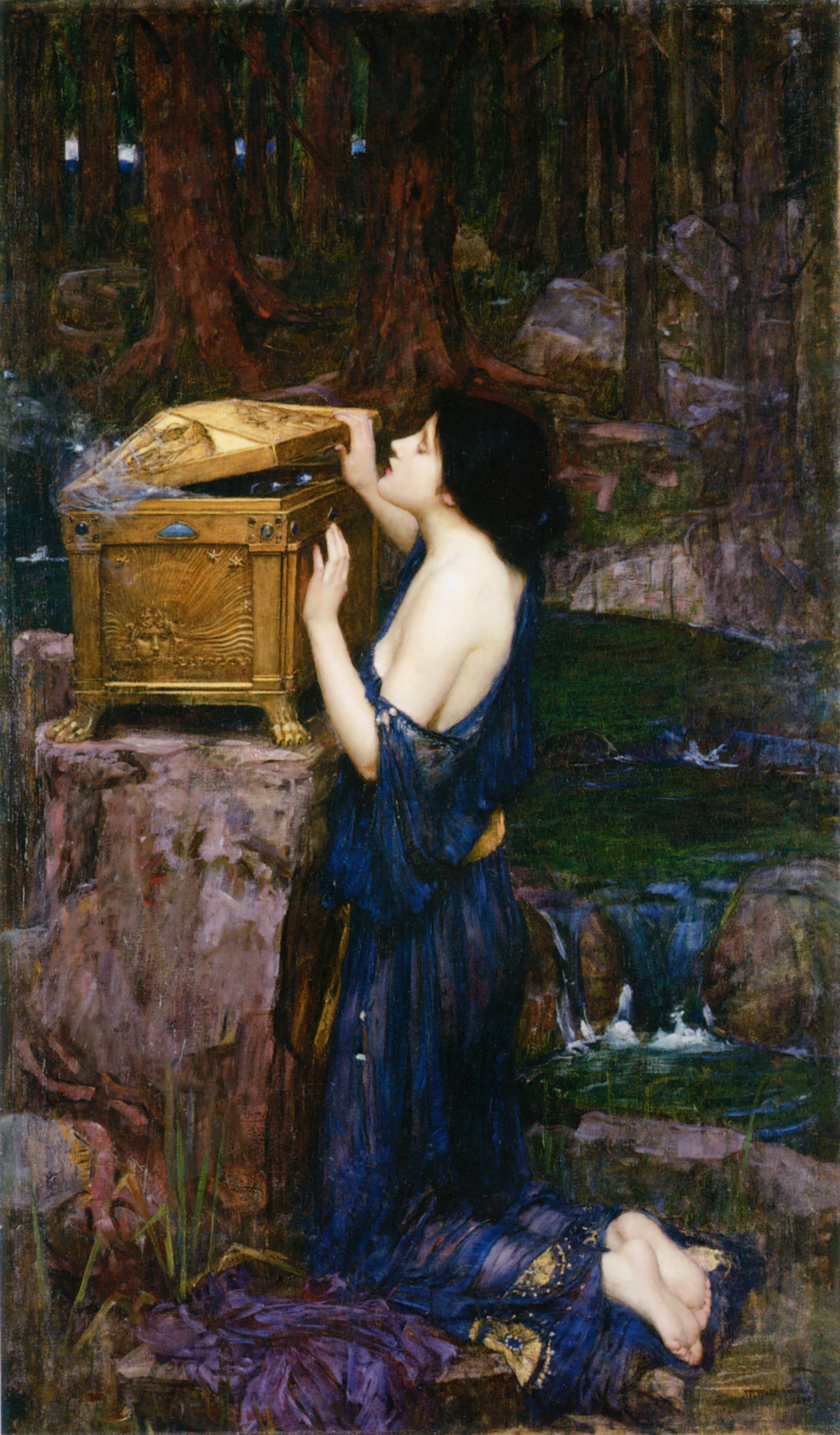
Gendo has been associated with religious and mythological figures and concepts, such as the God the Father of the Christian Trinity, the Oedipus legend, and the Pandora legend of Greek mythology.

In a draft of the twenty-fourth episode of the series, which was shelved during production, Kaworu Nagisa's character would compare Gendo to Paul, the protagonist of Erich Wolfgang Korngold's opera Die tote Stadt, a character who locks himself in his home after the death of his wife, building a "Temple of the Past" with her belongings; and later meets a young woman who looks similar to his late wife and falls in love with her. The Nerv base would be a "Temple of the Past" built by Gendo. In the director's-cut version of the episode, Seele also links Gendo's Instrumentality scenario to the myth of Pandora's box, which, as in the ancient Greek myth, Gendo metaphorically opens causing an uncontrollable catastrophe and releasing all of the world's evils, with only hope remaining at the bottom of the box. Scholar Alba G. Torrents compared Gendo's pursuit of Instrumentality to Jacques Lacan's psychoanalytic theory, according to which the complete fulfillment of one's desires corresponds to death. Torrents further argued that, as in Lacan's theory, the father enables the characters to become complete individuals.

Scholar Betty Stojnic argued Gendo's psychology exemplifies the figure of the disinterested or mentally unstable parent, "one of the most prominent character archetypes in Evangelion". The series also includes Gendo's dialogues about religion and the value of science, themes already present in other works by Hideaki Anno. Scholar Mariana Ortega compared Yui to a Madonna nursing Shinji and protecting him from Gendo, whom she associated with the Gnostic figure of the demiurge. For the Japanese critic Kotani Mari, Gendo assumes the connotations of the Supreme Being of Gnosticism, also named Monad. He has also been compared to Satan, Go Nagai's Devilman's antagonist; unlike Seele, who follows a plan based on faith in the Dead Sea Scrolls, Gendo wants to become a God himself, like a fallen angel who rebels against God. According to scholar Khegan M. DelPort, Gendo and Seele hold to the pessimistic view that "humanity needs to be overcome so that peace may return to the universe"; DelPort also compared Gendo's view to Existentialist philosopher Jean-Paul Sartre's statement, "Hell is other people".

According to the book Neon Genesis Evangelion: The Unofficial Guide, written by Kazuhisa Fujie and Martin Foster, a different spelling of the word Gendo (言動) can be translated as "conduct" and "words and behavior". This detail, together with the name of his son Shinji, which can be written with the kanji 神児 (shinji) and which Fujie and Foster translate as "child of God", and that of Rei Ayanami, which can be rendered as "spirit", "soul" (零, rei) in kanji, could be linked to the Christian Trinity and to the philosophical concept of "Logos", which in Evangelion seems to become an attribute of God the Father. In such a perspective, Rei represents the Holy Spirit, Shinji God the Son, and Gendo God the Father, referring to the first verses of the Gospel of John: "In the beginning was the Word, and the Word was with God, and the Word was God" (John 1:1). Writer Gerald Alva Miller described Gendo's Instrumentality as an attempt to "return to Edenic bliss". Scholar Yoshihiro Tanigawa similarly interpreted Gendo and Fuyutsuki's goal as a Buddhist nirvana, or an "oceanic bliss of eternal peace". Virginie Nebbia also compared Gendo and Fuyutsuki to Doba Ajiba and Gindoro Jinmu from Space Runaway Ideon.

Throughout the series, Gendo becomes the object of sexual desire for Dr. Naoko Akagi and at the same time for her daughter Ritsuko, in a modern retelling of the Electra complex. In the film The End of Evangelion, he shoots his former lover Ritsuko Akagi, telling her, "Dr. Akagi, actually...". The last part of the line was silently rendered, leaving it to the viewer to imagine the missing words; according to the interpretation of some fans, Gendo says "I need you" or "I needed you", in reference to "I need you", the title of the second half of the movie. Further reference to psychoanalysis is detectable in his relationship with Rei, a clone of his deceased wife, to whom Gendo is emotionally close while maintaining a tense relationship with his son. According to academic Medeline Ashby, Gendo "takes on the role of father, commander, employer, and possibly lover" for Rei. Neon Genesis Evangelion can therefore be seen as a reinterpretation of the Oedipus legend and as a story focused on the Oedipus complex postulated by Sigmund Freud. Betty Stojnic made similar observations, noting that Shinji struggles with his relationship with his father. According to Stojnic, however, Gendo ultimately alienates his son's affection through his own actions, turning their conflict into a self-fulfilling prophecy. Anno himself compared Evangelion to Ryū Murakami's novel Ai to gensō no fascism, whose protagonist Toji Suzuhara attempts to kill the Japanese prime minister, whom he finds similar to his father, and rapes his mother, who in the novel is Japan itself. Anno also described Neon Genesis Evangelion as a story in which the Oedipal rivalry between Gendo and his son is resolved in the last episode; the Eva represents a mother figure, while Gendo and the first Angel Adam represent the fathers of a "multi-layered Oedipus complex," in which Shinji "kills his father" and takes his mother away from him.

== Cultural impact ==
=== Popularity ===
After the conclusion of the series, Gendo emerged as the sixteenth-most-popular male character of the time in the 1996 Anime Grand Prix, a large survey conducted annually by the Japanese magazine Animage. The following year he rose to fourteenth place in the same poll, becoming the fourth-most-popular male character in Neon Genesis Evangelion. In February 1998, the magazine ranked him sixty-fifth among the hundred-most-popular anime characters. Gendo was also ranked in several surveys of the most-attractive anime characters in different categories, as well as in a Goo Ranking survey in which he was elected the third-most-hated father in Japanese animation. The character also appeared in rankings about Evangelion's most-beloved characters, usually in the top ten.

=== Critical reception ===
Gendo's character has elicited negative opinions from critics and animation fans. Wired magazine named him among the "worst relatives in television series", calling him "the most monstrous father ever". THEM Anime Reviews' Tim Jomes described him as a "creepy", frightening, "God complex"-plagued, and unpleasant man. Screen Rant and writers at Comic Book Resources listed him among the least-likable characters in the series, criticizing his abusive ways. Comic Book Resources' Jacob Buchalter similarly ranked Gendo as the second-worst character in shōnen anime. Zac Bertschy, a reviewer for Anime News Network, criticized the character's manipulative, self-centered attitude, calling him a "giant douchebag" and defended his son Shinji, whom he says has been unfairly criticized by fans for being cowardly or wimpy. Bertschy, however, praised his characterization, naming him among the most memorable antagonists in the history of Japanese animation: "Gendo Ikari is the worst dad ever imagined, and so it logically follows that he is also the most memorable villain. It's just science. I don't make the rules". Comic Book Resources' Michael Iacono similarly named Gendo, for his "diabolical brilliance, all-or-nothing attitude, and deeply flawed character traits", among the best antagonists in anime history.

Several reviewers have criticized his development. Anime News Network's Lynzee Loveridge described Gendo's betrayal and actions in the film The End of Evangelion as "shocking", listing them among eight betrayals that have shocked the audience. Anime scholar Nicolle Lamerichs similarly described him as "one of the most problematic characters in anime history". Sci Fi Weekly's Tasha Robinson was disappointed with the series finale, saying it does not fully explore Gendo's motivations and abilities. Anime News Network's Kenneth Lee also noted Shinji, willing to die during the fight against the Eva-03, has a similar determination to his father Gendo, saying, "it is rather frightening and interesting to see so many possible parallels between the characters", which "remain inconclusive", criticizing the series for leaving "a group of suppositions that will never be answered". Other reviewers were more appreciative of his role in spin-offs and the manga adaptation of the series. Kotaku's Richard Eisenbeis appreciated the developments and insights into Gendo's past introduced in Sadamoto's manga version, which he said are clearer and more interesting than the original series. This view is echoed by Carlos Santos from Anime News Network, who praised the changes in the spin-off comic The Shinji Ikari Raising Project which, according to Santos, with its comic moments and less dark-and-twisted backgrounds than the animated series, would offer a more serene and enjoyable image of Gendo as a "hapless, comedic father which is good for a few chuckles".

Gendo is not exactly popular in Japan. Many think that he is too stern with Shinji and that he generally exudes the aura of a hard, traditional, strict father. Gendo was meant to be a strong father who should have a positive influence on Shinji so that he could grow to be more confident and adult-like. Many modern fathers in Japan are "mollycoddled" which was another reason to make Ikari Gendo into a strong father.

— Neon Genesis Evangelion assistant director Kazuya Tsurumaki

Gendo's role in Rebuild of Evangelion also drew criticism and praise. Anime News Network's Justin Sevakis praised the film's opening scene, in which he visits Yui's grave with Shinji, saying, "There's a warmness here, a feeling of great affection that wasn't so prevalent in the original [series]". Conversely, Comic Book Resources's Angelo Delos Trinos negatively received Gendo's role in Rebuild, deeming the character too powerful. Anime Reign magazine criticized Gendo's new role in Evangelion 3.0 as underdeveloped and shadowy. A diametrically opposite opinion was expressed by Nicole MacLean of THEM Anime Reviews; Browne stated she greatly appreciated the dynamism of the fight between Gendo's "egotistical genius" and his former Wille subordinates, which "suits this franchise perfectly".

Other reviewers have praised Gendo's role in the last installment of the saga, Evangelion: 3.0+1.0 Thrice Upon a Time, in which his motivations and psychology, and his relationship with Shinji are analyzed. Vulture wrote, "To longtime Eva fans, Gendo explaining himself feels monumental". According to Mechademia scholar Nicolle Lamerichs, Gendo's new characterization received a mixed response from fans. While some criticized the decision to invite sympathy for a character who had previously been portrayed as abusive and antagonistic, others welcomed his expanded characterization. Lamerichs nevertheless argued that the overall reception was positive, describing the reconciliation between Gendo and Shinji as "cathartic for fans as well" and adding that, "in a way, Evangelion had been building up to this moment for years". Anime News Network's Richard Eisenbeis wrote, "Thrice Upon a Time makes great strides in expanding and developing his character". Eisenbeis also described its focus on Gendo as "the most important element of the film ... Even if you still hate Gendo by the end of this exploration, it's hard not to empathize with him". Reviewers lauded the film for giving the character more depth, and the conflict with Shinji has a central part in the plot's development. According to IGN writer Devin Meenan, Rebuild brings a closure to the character "that the original lacked". Thrillist's Kambole Campbell described the emotional openness of Gendo and the other characters as "moving", while IndieWire lauded the fact that the father-son dynamic is a central part of the story, culminating in "some of the most emotionally raw moments Evangelion has ever put on screen".

=== Merchandise and legacy ===
Gendo has been used to produce merchandising items, such as sunglasses and eyeglasses, collectible models, shirts, and culinary products. Gendo has appeared in video games and spin-offs based on the original animated series, and in media unrelated to the Neon Genesis Evangelion franchise, such as in the Million Arthur video games, Monster Strike, and Puzzle & Dragons. The character was used for campaigns of the Japan Racing Association and for advertisements of the Schick razor company, a collaboration that attracted the attention of animation fans and was renewed years after the first advertising video. In 2011, he also inspired an attraction at the Japanese amusement park Fuji-Q Highland. In 2015, Gendo was used along with other characters from the series for features on the 500 Type Eva, a high-speed train dedicated to Evangelion.

Famous people have paid homage to Gendo by cosplaying as him, including Minoru Takashita, president of the AnimeJapan company, Takashi Kawamura, mayor of Nagoya, and economist Takkaki Mitsuhashi, who founded a Cosplay Party for the 2010 Japanese House of Councillors election. Gendo has also inspired the pose of a character that appears in the opening sequence of the video game Evil Factory, developed by Neople. According to Vice's Chia Contreras, Gendo's image and austere face have achieved notoriety and have reached non-animation-fan audiences, becoming "one of the most easily recognizable images of anime on the internet". On the web, Gendo is often associated with the phrase "Get in the fucking robot, Shinji", which has also gone viral. The phrase has become an internet meme and has been used for merchandise items dedicated to the series. Screen Rant's Adam Beach noted Ragyō Kiryūin's office in Kill la Kill is similar to Gendo's. Bleeding Cool similarly interpreted a line by Quentin Quire from an X-Men comic as a reference to the "Get in the robot" meme. Holland Novak from Eureka Seven has also been compared with Gendo. Fans have renamed his characteristic pose, with his hands joined at face height, the "Gendo pose", which has been copied, homaged, and parodied in other animated series, such as Taizo Haisegawa in Gintama, which is also voiced by Fumihiko Tachiki, Voltron: Legendary Defender, by Stella in Rose Guns Days, by Nifuji Hirotaka in Wotakoi: Love Is Hard for Otaku, and by Hayato in an official crossover episode between Evangelion and Shinkansen Henkei Robo Shinkalion.

== Bibliography ==
- 別冊JUNE (in Japanese). Magazine Magazine. September 1996.
- Sanenari, Oizumi (1997). Anno Hideaki Sukidzo Evangerion (in Japanese). Ōta Shuppan. ISBN 4-87233-315-2.
- Takekuma, Kentaro (1997). Anno Hideaki Parano Evangerion (in Japanese). Ōta Shuppan. ISBN 4-87233-316-0.
- Fujie, Kazuhisa; Foster, Martin (2004). Neon Genesis Evangelion: The Unofficial Guide. United States: DH Publishing, Inc. ISBN 0-9745961-4-0.
- Poggio, Alessandra (2008). Neon Genesis Evangelion Encyclopedia (in Italian). Dynit.
- Porori, Syunsou (2009). The Essential Evangelion Chronicle: Side A (in French). Glénat Editions. ISBN 978-2-7234-7120-6.
- Porori, Syunsou (2010). The Essential Evangelion Chronicle: Side B (in French). Glénat Editions. ISBN 978-2-7234-7121-3.
- Yamashita, Ikuto (2010). Neon Genesis Evangelion Anima Visual Book (in Japanese). ASCII Media Works. ISBN 978-4-04-868526-9.
- Miller, Gerald Alva Jr. (2012). Exploring the Limits of the Human Through Science Fiction. Palgrave Macmillan. ISBN 978-1-137-26285-1.
- Torrents, Alba G. (2013). "La relación con lo materno en el cuerpo robótico en Neon Genesis Evangelion". Debats: Revista de cultura, poder i societat (in Spanish) (119). Institució Alfons el Magnànim.
- Marine, Alexandre (2021). Neon Genesis Evangelion: Le renouveau de l'animation japonaise (in French). Pix'n love Editions. ISBN 978-2-37188-093-1.
- Stojnic, Betty (2021). "Boy With Machine: A Deleuzo-Guattarian Critique of Neon Genesis Evangelion". Journal of Anime and Manga Studies. 2. Archived from the original on April 22, 2026.
- Cotton, Christian; Winters, Andrew M., eds. (2022). Neon Genesis Evangelion and Philosophy. Carus Books. ISBN 978-1-63770-004-4.
- Tsukamoto, Satoshi (2022). "The Enigmatic Power of Neon Genesis Evangelion" (PDF). 文明. 21 (48). Aichi University.
- Lamerichs, Nicolle (2022). "The Emotional Realism of Anime: Rewriting Characters and Affective Reception in Evangelion 3.0+1.0: Thrice Upon a Time". Mechademia. 15 (1). Minneapolis: University of Minnesota Press: 81–102. eISSN 2152-6648. ISSN 1934-2489. JSTOR 48853842. LCCN 2006215646. OCLC 1376034838. S2CID 254824343. Gale A732431709.
- Nebbia, Virginie (2023). La Saga Evangelion: L'oeuvre d'une vie (in French). Third Editions. ISBN 978-2-3778-4430-2. Archived from the original on October 25, 2023.
- Iso, Mitsuo (2023). 磯光雄 ANIMATION WORKS preproduction [Iso Mitsuo ANIMATION WORKS preproduction] (in Japanese) (1st ed.). Tokyo, Japan: Style. ISBN 978-4-80-213353-1.
