= Neon Genesis Evangelion: Shinji Ikari Raising Project =

Life simulation computer game

- Box art of Neon Genesis Evangelion: Shinji Ikari Raising Project

新世紀エヴァンゲリオン 碇シンジ育成計画 (Shin Seiki Evangerion: Ikari Shinji Ikusei Keikaku)
- Genre: Romantic comedy
- Video game
- Publisher: Gainax
- Genre: Life simulation game, Raising simulation
- Platform: Windows 2000/ME/XP
- Released: 24 September 2004
- Manga
- Written by: Osamu Takahashi
- Published by: Kadokawa Shoten
- English publisher: NA: Dark Horse Comics
- Magazine: Shōnen Ace
- Original run: March 2006 – May 2016
- Volumes: 18

Neon Genesis Evangelion: Shinji Ikari Raising Project (新世紀エヴァンゲリオン 碇シンジ育成計画, Shin Seiki Evangerion: Ikari Shinji Ikusei Keikaku) is a life simulation computer game based on the anime series, Neon Genesis Evangelion. The player assumes control of both Shinji Ikari and Misato Katsuragi, the protagonists of the aforementioned anime series, to "raise" Shinji. This is done through making him complete a number of different tasks. Shinji Ikari Raising Project is the second and final entry in the Raising Project series of Evangelion games, preceded by Neon Genesis Evangelion: Ayanami Raising Project in 2001. Both games bear a strong similarity to publisher Gainax's Princess Maker series. The game was released officially in Japanese and Korean, and has received fan translations into English and Russian. The game was written by Nobuaki Takerube, and its artwork was drawn by Kengo Yonekura and Dream Japan Co., Ltd.

A manga series of the same name, by Takahashi Osamu, was serialized in Shōnen Ace and published by Kadokawa between March 2005 and May 2016. It totaled 18 volumes in length.

Both the game and manga introduce three new female Nerv technicians: Kaede Agano (阿賀野 カエデ, Agano Kaede) (voiced by Ai Shimizu), Satsuki Ooi (大井 サツキ, Ōi Satsuki) (voiced by Maria Yamamoto), and Aoi Mogami (最上 アオイ, Mogami Aoi) (voiced by Yui Horie).

== Plot ==
The game features three main story routes, known as Thanatos, Pathos and Campus, respectively. Each route goes for a different amount of "episodes", which can last between two and eight weeks of in-game time and focus on a specific segment of the story. Which route the player ends up on is primarily determined by the hidden Independence parameter.

The Thanatos route loosely adapts the story of the original show and spans 26 episodes. The first seven episodes of this route are compulsory in every playthrough. Like the original series, this route sees main character, Shinji, summoned to NERV by his estranged father, Gendo Ikari, and tasked with piloting an Evangelion unit. He is placed under the care of Misato Katsuragi, who functions as his guardian and parental figure. He and the other pilots, Rei Ayanami and later, Asuka Langley Soryu, must fight alien-like beings called Angels in order to prevent a disaster called the "Third Impact" from occurring. While it cuts out and changes certain things from the original series, the Thanatos route does not diverge from Neon Genesis Evangelion's plot in a substantial way. It adapts up to a brief version of "The Beast That Shouted "I" At The Heart of the World", and most endings it can culminate in resemble the final scene of The End of Evangelion

After episode 7, the player will have the ability to move to and from the Thanatos and Pathos routes, a version of events which follows basically the same plot outline but in a more comedic fashion. This route sees Shinji and the other characters doing a number of recreational activities to progress in the story, such as selling ice-cream, camping and synchronized swimming. This route also sees both Toji Suzuhara and Kensuke Aida becoming Eva pilots. It culminates in the Third Impact being prevented, as well as a number of additional, optional endings determined by the player's stats.

Starting in episode 21, the third route, Campus, which loosely adapts the alternate, slice-of-life-esque world presented in episode 26 of the original series, may be unlocked by the player. This route sees Shinji attending class in a universe with no Evas or Angels, living a normal life as a teenage boy, where the staff at NERV are now his teachers and the original Evangelion series is a fictional work written by him and Kaworu Nagisa in class. Mana Kirishima, the secondary protagonist of previous Evangelion video game Girlfriend of Steel, is also now one of the students of class 2-A, and his mother, Yui Ikari, is alive and away on international work. This path culminates in one of two ways: either the player chooses to have Shinji end the Evangelion story with 'a happy ending in the new world', and the path will continue until episode 26 and give the player one of several Campus-specific ending combinations, or they will choose to end it by returning to the original world, and the path will terminate on episode 24 and return to the Pathos route instead.

All three main routes can be identified by the player by looking at the dialogue box shown in each episode. The Thanatos route's dialogue box has a dark grey border with the words 'Neon Genesis Evangelion' embedded above the character portrait. The Pathos route's dialogue box is a lighter grey with two green stripes on either side of the character portrait. The Campus route's dialogue box is purple with a gold trim around the edges. After episode 21, the player is locked into the route they are on, except in the case of Campus, which allows the player to decide between it and the Pathos route on episode 24.

The game also features an additional route, Kaworu Nagisa Education Project, which is unlocked when the player finishes a single playthrough of the main game. This route spans a single episode and sees the player take control of both Kaworu and Ritsuko Akagi in the place of Shinji and Misato. Ritsuko is tasked by Seele with educating Kaworu, their goal being for Kaworu to seduce Shinji, to distract him and allow them to use Unit-01 as the helm of the Human Instrumentality Project. This route can culminate in four endings.

== Gameplay ==
Every Sunday, the player, as Misato, will be asked to set 12 scheduled activities for Shinji to complete over the course of the following week, one in the morning and one in the afternoon of each day until Saturday. The player may pick from a set of 12 standard activities and 18 extra activities that rotate depending on where they are in the story. Picking certain activities will impact Shinji's parameters, which in turn influence the story the player sees unfold. Some episodes also contain a battle against an Angel, in which Shinji and the other Evangelion pilots must fight off the enemy.

=== Parameters ===
- Knowledge (学力): The higher this is, the less likely Shinji will fail tests. It also aides in shooting accuracy in battle (in combination with synchronization rate). It can be increased by attending Intelligence Enhancement classes.
- Physical strength (体力): The higher this is, the less likely Shinji will become sick. It also increases the strength of attacks, as well as the Eva's defense, in battle (in combination with sensitivity and synchronization rate).
- Morality (道徳): The higher this is, the more likely Shinji will listen to Misato during battle. Asuka also has this stat and may disobey Misato's orders depending on how high it is, but her schedule cannot be impacted by the player.
- Sensitivity (感受性): The higher this is, the higher the Eva's defense during battle will be (in combination with physical strength and synchronization rate).
- Sex Appeal (色気): The higher this is, the more attracted the women in the game will be to Shinji. It may also trigger some weekly events (i.e. an event where Misato confronts Shinji over hiding pornography magazines in his room) if this stat is greater than morality.
- Synchronization rate (シンクロ率): The higher this is, the greater shooting accuracy (in combination with intelligence) and greater defense (in combination with physical strength and sensitivity) an Eva will have. A higher synchronization rate also means that Eva Unit-01 will go berserk after taking less damage in battle.
- Stress (ストレス): The higher this is, the more likely Shinji will get sick. It functions primarily in relation to the physical strength stat; if stress is lower than strength, Shinji will stay healthy.
- Work Progress (仕事進捗): Misato's progress into developing new weapons, based on how frequently the player selects the "NERV Official Work" option from the Sunday menu.
- Money (所持金): On the first Sunday of any given month, Misato will receive either 10,000 yen, or 7,000 yen if the city was damaged in the previous battle.
- Independence (自立度): A hidden parameter, but also one of the most important; the amount Shinji has will affect which game path you obtain. It starts out at 500 points and can be increased and decreased through various activities and events.
- Affection (好意): A number of hidden parameters (for Misato, Asuka, Rei, Mana, Satsuki, Aoi, Kaede, Kaji and Shinji's Friends); These stats are related mostly to romance events, or determine which endings Shinji may get.

==== Relationships ====
- Misato Katsuragi: Misato's affection is influenced by the extra choices available on Sunday. It also increases every time Shinji attends Battle Training classes, given that he is alone. A high affection parameter for Misato can result in a romance ending.
- Asuka Langley Soryu: Asuka's affection will increase every time she and Shinji attend a scheduled activity together. It can also be raised by Cleaning on Sundays. A high affection parameter for Asuka can result in a romance ending.
- Rei Ayanami: Rei's affection will increase every time she and Shinji attend a scheduled activity together. A high affection parameter for Rei can result in a romance ending.
- Mana Kirishima: Mana is unlocked through Shinji joining the Music Club at the start of the game. Mana's affection will be increased every time Shinji attends her club. A high affection parameter for Mana can result in a romance ending.
- Satsuki Ooi: Satsuki's affection will increase every time Shinji attends the Sensitivity Enhancement Program or Culture School, given that he is alone. A high affection parameter for Satsuki can result in a romance ending.
- Kaede Agano: Kaede's affection will increase every time Shinji attends the Mental Enhancement Program or Volunteer Work, given that he is alone. A high affection parameter for Kaede can result in a romance ending.
- Aoi Mogami: Aoi's affection will increase points every time Shinji attends the Intelligence Enhancement Program or Cram School, given that he is alone. A high affection parameter for Aoi can result in a romance ending.
- Kaworu Nagisa: Kaworu does not have an affection parameter. Instead, attending a scheduled activity together will decrease everyone else's affection parameters. If the affection parameters of both the women and Shinji's friends are below a certain amount at the end of the game, this can result in a romance ending with Kaworu.
- Kaji Ryoji: After Kaji arrives in the story, his affection will increase every time Shinji attends the Fitness Enhancement Program or Sports Club, given that he is alone. If his affection is higher than a certain amount, extra dialogue from Kaji will be present in Pathos Episode 26.
- Friends: 'Friends' refers to all of Shinji's classmates, but mostly Toji Suzuhara and Kensuke Aida. Their affection will increase if Shinji attends School, given that he is alone, Free Time with Toji and Kensuke or the Basketball and AV Clubs. High affection with friends can result in a number of different endings, namely the World Without Shinji endings.
- Shinji Ikari (Kaworu route): In the Kaworu Nagisa Education Project route, Shinji is the only character with an affection parameter. How high his affection stat is will affect the ending the player obtains.

=== Battles ===
Angel battles occur in most episodes. These battles will generally conclude one of two ways: in the first, Shinji and any other pilots involved will defeat the angel using their weaponry, and in the second, Unit-01 will go berserk after taking too much damage and the angel will be destroyed that way instead. New and more powerful weapons for battle can be obtained using the NERV Official Work feature in the Sunday menu. The battle menu contains several options:

- Wait (待機): On Misato's menu. Puts the N2 mines on stand-by until the next round.
- Armed Building (武装ビル): On Misato's menu. Fires N2 mines from the armed buildings, attacking the angel.
- Attack (攻撃): On the Eva menu. The Eva will attack the angel with or without a weapon.
- Close in (肉薄): On the Eva menu. The Eva will drop its equipment and attack the angel directly. (Only available when holding an item.)
- Defend (防御): On the Eva menu. Magnifies the Eva's defense.
- Concentrate (集中): On the Eva menu. Magnifies the Eva's concentration ratio. (Available only when holding an item).
- Wait (待機): On the Eva menu. The Eva will wait for an incoming attack from the angel and counter it.

=== Endings ===
Each route in the game has its own set of endings.

All routes have endings determined by Shinji's affection parameters, with the owner of the highest affection (or Kaworu, if the others are all low) being the focus of the ending. Some endings also see Shinji taking on a career path and are determined by his other parameters, primarily physical strength, sex appeal and morality; these are found in both the Pathos and Campus routes, and come in combination with a relationship ending.

==== Thanatos route endings ====
- Adam and Eve (アダムとイヴ): Shinji and the woman with the highest affection parameter have a conversation on a beach next to a red sea.
- The Sea of LCL (LCLの海): Kaworu walks around a beach, speaking to an absent Shinji, who has chosen to stay in instrumentality.
- A World Without Shinji (シンジの居ない世界): Episode 21 of Campus route plays out without Shinji, who has chosen to stay in instrumentality. Also occurs in the Pathos route.

==== Pathos route affection endings ====
- Keeping Company (-と付き合う): Shinji dates the woman with the highest affection parameter. Also occurs in the Campus route.
- Content Person (イイヒト): Shinji is doing fine by himself, without a partner. Also occurs in the Campus route.
- A World Without Shinji (シンジの居ない世界): Episode 21 of Campus route plays out without Shinji, who has chosen to stay in instrumentality. Also occurs in the Thanatos route.

==== Campus route affection endings ====
- Joined in Marriage (-と結ばれる): Shinji marries the woman with the highest affection parameter.
- Living with Kaworu (カヲルと同棲): Shinji and Kaworu enter a domestic relationship.
- Keeping Company (-と付き合う): Shinji dates the woman with the highest affection parameter. Also occurs in the Pathos route.
- Content Person (イイヒト): Shinji is doing fine by himself, without a partner. Also occurs in the Pathos route.

==== Pathos and Campus route career endings ====
- Cellist (チェロ奏者): Shinji becomes a professional cellist. Three different versions of this ending can occur, depending on the player's stats.
- Rock Band (ロックバンド): Shinji forms a rock band. Three different versions of this ending can occur.
- Stage Director (舞台演出家): Shinji becomes a stage play director. Three different versions of this ending can occur.
- Painter (画家): Shinji becomes a professional painter. Three different versions of this ending can occur.
- Manga Artist (漫画家): Shinji works with Kensuke to become a professional manga artist. Three different versions of this ending can occur.
- Novelist (小説家): Shinji becomes a professional fiction author. Three different versions of this ending can occur.
- Action Hero (アクションヒーロー): Shinji becomes an action movie hero called Blademan. Three different versions of this ending can occur.
- Basketball Player (バスケ選手): Shinji becomes a professional basketball player. Three different versions of this ending can occur.
- Youth Overseas Cooperation Volunteer (青年海外協力隊): Shinji becomes a volunteer, helping out in a foreign country.
- Middle School Teacher (中学教師): Shinji becomes a teacher at a middle school.
- College Student (大学生): Shinji attends college with Rei, Asuka and Mana.
- Stuck In School (浪人生): Shinji is stuck in college, repeatedly failing the same year.

==== Kaworu Nagisa Education Project endings ====
- Ending 1: Kaworu and Shinji run away together, while Seele prepare to begin the Human Instrumentality Project.
- Ending 2: Kaworu betrays Seele, instead deciding to tell Shinji about their plans, as well as the truth of his identity.
- Ending 3: Kaworu sacrifices himself after Shinji tells him he cannot leave NERV to be with him.
- Ending 4: Kaworu sacrifices himself after Shinji fails to meet with him.

== Manga ==
The Neon Genesis Evangelion: Shinji Ikari Raising Project manga is loosely based on the game's Campus route. The manga diverges from the original Neon Genesis Evangelion and shares several plot divergences with Neon Genesis Evangelion: Angelic Days.

Asuka, Shinji and Rei on the cover of Volume 1

- Shinji and Asuka, who share a rather unbalanced relationship in the original series, are childhood friends. In the manga, Shinji and Asuka first met when they were both 4. Both Shinji and Asuka are much more stable, and Asuka is particularly possessive of him. She has begun to develop romantic feelings towards Shinji at some point just before the manga begins, and sees Rei as her primary romantic competition, though she also sees Kaworu as a threat due to what she sees as his very overt attempts to flirt with Shinji. As such, she finds Rei to be her only ally in keeping Kaworu, and later, Mana from getting too close to Shinji.
- Yui Ikari, Shinji's mother, is still alive and working at Nerv along with her husband Gendo. She is the head scientist in the place of Ritsuko Akagi.
- Gendo and Shinji's relationship is less negative and has a more competitive nature; the two usually attempt to outdo the other.
- Rei is introduced as a distant relative of Shinji's from Yui's side of the family. She is also another interest for Shinji, much to the irritation of Asuka, and the two find themselves competing for his affections. Though this rarely takes the form of any kind of direct physical competition, and Shinji himself often finds the entire situation confusing and stressful. Like Asuka, Rei considers Kaworu an interloper to her relationship with Shinji and will often team with her to make sure that Kaworu does not get too far in what she and Asuka see as attempts to flirt with Shinji.
- Misato Katsuragi is the homeroom teacher for Shinji and Asuka's class and Ritsuko Akagi is the school's nurse, although both still have some connection with Nerv.
- Kyoko Zeppelin Soryu, Asuka's mother, is still alive and working at Nerv like Yui. She is portrayed as an airhead and has a very simplistic way of talking.
- Kaworu Nagisa is a transfer student and undercover Seele agent being ordered to disturb Shinji's relationships with Asuka and Rei. He also has some sort of connection to Ritsuko, who supports him in his mission, but quickly disappears from the plot.
- Mana Kirishima is a transfer student and undercover agent sent by Gendo and Yui that quickly takes an interest in Shinji, also trying to counterbalance his relationship with Asuka and Rei.
