= Neon Genesis Evangelion: Girlfriend of Steel =

1997 video game

- Developer: Gainax Network Systems
- Publishers: Gainax; Sega (Sega Saturn); CyberFront (PSP)
- Platforms: PlayStation, PlayStation 2, PSP, Sega Saturn, Microsoft Windows (PC), Macintosh
- Release: Windows: JP: 1997; JP: April 2006 (Special Edition); Macintosh: JP: 1997; Sega Saturn: JP: March 26, 1998; PlayStation: JP: April 16, 1998; PlayStation 2: JP: April 2006 (Special Edition); PlayStation Portable: JP: April 9, 2009 (Special Edition)
- Genre: Visual novel
- Mode: Single player

Neon Genesis Evangelion: Girlfriend of Steel (新世紀エヴァンゲリオン鋼鉄のガールフレンド, Shinseiki Evangerion: Kōtetsu no Gārufurendo) is a video game based on the Gainax anime/manga series Neon Genesis Evangelion, released officially only in Japan for the PlayStation, Sega Saturn, PlayStation 2, PSP, Windows (PC), and Macintosh. Neon Genesis Evangelion: Girlfriend of Steel 2nd, first released in 2005, is not a narrative sequel and does not feature the original character Mana Kirishima. She reappears in other spin-offs, such as Neon Genesis Evangelion: Shinji Ikari Raising Project.

== Gameplay ==
Neon Genesis Evangelion: Girlfriend of Steel is a single-player adventure game that follows Shinji Ikari through an original story set within the continuity of the Neon Genesis Evangelion television series. Gameplay primarily focuses on progressing through the narrative, with animated scenes, character dialogue and voice acting.

The player interacts with characters and environments through a simplified menu-based interface, with commands for looking, talking and moving between locations. Contemporary Japanese previews emphasised the game's straightforward controls and focus on storytelling rather than complex gameplay mechanics.

== Development ==
Girlfriend of Steel was developed by Gainax as an original side story to Neon Genesis Evangelion, taking place around episodes 8–13 of the television series. The game was written and directed by Ritsurō Hashimoto, with Yoshiyuki Sadamoto credited for original character design and Ikuto Yamashita for mechanical design.

Following its initial computer release in 1997, a Sega Saturn conversion was announced in early 1998. The Saturn edition was published by Sega in Japan on 26 March 1998, on two CD-ROMs, with a retail price of ¥6,800 before tax.

== Releases ==
The original version was released by Gainax for Microsoft Windows PCs in 1997. Subsequently, the Macintosh version was released in response to requests from Mac users. In April 2006, a special edition was released for the PS2 and the PC as part of Evangelion's ten-year anniversary, with additional scenes focusing on the TRIDENT pilots' lives. On April 9, 2009, a version for the PlayStation Portable was released. The PSP edition received a full English language fan translation in 2023.

== Story ==
Fourteen-year-old Mana Kirishima (voiced by Megumi Hayashibara) is transferred to Shinji Ikari's school, and almost immediately they begin to establish a special relationship. This provokes much jealousy in Asuka, who also suspects that Mana is a spy who is trying to get information from Shinji about NERV and the Evas. Rei Ayanami is present but plays a rather background role in the story, though she seems to agree with the suspicions of Asuka. Gradually, a relationship between Mana and Shinji unfolds and they end up going on a date. It turns out, however, that Mana is one of three test pilots for the TRIDENT (alternatively named the "Country Crawler") units, a new competitor to the Evangelions, similar to Jet Alone; thus the name Girlfriend of Steel. Eventually, the TRIDENT goes berserk and the Evas have to destroy it.

The interactivity in most of the game is limited to walking around areas until the next plot event is triggered. However, the one true branch occurs at the end of the game, where the player may choose to focus on Mana, Asuka or Kaji. This choice determines which of the game's three endings are shown, with a fourth added in the PS2 and PSP releases.

In the Mana ending, Mana is discovered not to have been killed in the battle. Shinji rescues her and brings her back to his apartment. She showers, emerges wearing only a towel, and teasingly asks Shinji if he would like her to remove it (which she eventually does). In discussion with Misato, however, it is agreed that Mana has to leave Tokyo-3, and she says a teary goodbye to Shinji who has won her heart.

In the Asuka ending, Asuka helps Shinji to get over Mana and the two children grow closer as a result. This ending contains romantic images of Asuka and Shinji together, including a moving scene where Asuka hugs Shinji emotionally.

The third ending with Kaji does not focus on any one character as much as the other endings do. Mana is also discovered not to be killed, and says goodbye, with Shinji replying "I'll be waiting for you".

In the fourth ending, seeking shelter from the rain, Shinji tries to forget his problems, and Mana, with a drink. He eventually falls in the trash outside and is found by Mana. After drying his clothes, the two spend the night together and express their feelings for one another. Mana eventually ends up with NERV, after a lot of paperwork, so she can be with Shinji. Asuka has moved on with her life and the final shot is Shinji and Mana holding hands as Mana says 'thank you'.

The ending song is Yokan (予感, "Premonition"), sung by Yoko Takahashi.

== Reception ==
Reception

Review score
Publication	Score
Dengeki PlayStation	65/100, 80/100

Girlfriend of Steel won the 1997 "Best Interactive Software" Animation Kobe award. The PlayStation Portable version of the game sold 4,603 copies the week of its release.

The Sega Saturn version received a combined score of 23 out of 30 from three reviewers in the 3 April 1998 issue of Sega Saturn Magazine. The reviewers awarded it individual scores of 7, 8 and 8 out of 10. They praised its faithful conversion from the original computer release and its animated storytelling, although the game's limited interactivity was noted.

In a retrospective ranking of Sega Saturn games based on reader evaluations, published in 2000, Girlfriend of Steel placed 317th out of 945 titles, with an average rating of 8.237 out of 10.
