= Misato Katsuragi =

Fictional character from Neon Genesis Evangelion

- Neon Genesis Evangelion character
- First appearance: Neon Genesis Evangelion chapter 1: "Angel Attack" (1994)
- Created by: Gainax; Hideaki Anno; Yoshiyuki Sadamoto
- Voiced by: Japanese: Kotono Mitsuishi; English: Allison Keith (ADV Films dub, Rebuild); Carrie Keranen (Netflix dub)

In-universe information
- Gender: Female
- Titles: Captain; Major; Lieutenant colonel
- Significant other: Ryoji Kaji
- Relatives: Pen Pen (pet); Shinji Ikari (ward); Asuka Langley Soryu (ward)
- Nationality: Japanese

Misato Katsuragi (Japanese: 葛城 ミサト, Hepburn: Katsuragi Misato) is a fictional character from the Neon Genesis Evangelion media franchise, created by animation studio Gainax. In the eponymous anime television series, Misato is head of the operations department of the special agency Nerv, and is in charge of directing and devising war strategies needed to defeat mysterious beings named Angels. Due to childhood emotional traumas, she developed a frivolous, exuberant character and a disordered lifestyle. The character also appears in the franchise's animated feature films and related media, including video games, the original net animation Petit Eva: Evangelion@School, the Rebuild of Evangelion films, and the manga adaptation by Yoshiyuki Sadamoto.

For the creation of the character, Neon Genesis Evangelion director Hideaki Anno took inspiration from his personality. Misato is also inspired by several real-life figures and other anime characters, including Usagi Tsukino from Pretty Guardian Sailor Moon. Critics have drawn parallels between Misato's characterization and concepts of philosophers and psychologists such as Carl Gustav Jung, Arthur Schopenhauer, and Søren Kierkegaard; Misato's feelings for her father have been linked to Jung's Electra complex, her personal philosophy to Schopenhauer's hedgehog dilemma, and her psychology to Kierkegaard's concept of existential despair as presented in The Sickness unto Death.

Misato has been widely popular with audiences and has appeared at the top of popularity polls. Some critics have contrasted her histrionic personality and sexual overtones with her 14-year-old subordinate and Evangelion protagonist Shinji Ikari; others have appreciated her spontaneity, tenacity, and endearment. She has also inspired merchandise and other subsequent anime characters.

== Conception ==
The franchise's creator Hideaki Anno initially proposed to include a female protagonist in Neon Genesis Evangelion, a young woman similar to Asuka Langley Soryu accompanied by a female soldier in a "big sister" role similar to Kōichirō Ōta's character from Anno's previous work GunBuster. At the request of Yoshiyuki Sadamoto, the series' character designer, the initial scenario was changed and Shinji Ikari, a male character, became the protagonist; ideas for the "older sister" character went into what would become Misato. As with other Neon Genesis Evangelion characters, the character's name was inspired by a Japanese Imperial Navy ship, the aircraft carrier Katsuragi, and Misato Izumi, a female character from Minako Narita's manga Aitsu. To outline her personality, Anno took inspiration from Usagi Tsukino, the 14-year-old protagonist of the series Pretty Guardian Sailor Moon, thinking of Misato as an adult version of Usagi. Sadamoto also drew Misato taking his cue from Usagi's character design and picking up her hair. The characters' aesthetic similarities were emphasized by the choice of Kotono Mitsuishi, the original performer of Usagi, as Misato's voice actress.

Early designs for Misato by mangaka Yoshiyuki Sadamoto, first published in 1993

For her facial features, the staff took inspiration from Fujiko Mine from the anime Lupin III and Japanese writer Aya Sugimoto. Sadamoto tried to give Misato a "girl next door" role; she was originally thought of as a fashion-conscious woman who constantly changes her clothing and is apparently unsuited to military life; she was also conceived as emotional, stubborn and frivolous, and able, if forced by events, to sleep with all of the men at Nerv. The artist, inspired by the clothes worn by racers, decided to portray her with motorcyclist dresses. As a motoring enthusiast, he also poured his passion into the character, depicting her as an admirer of sports cars. It was his idea to equip her with a modified Renault Alpine A310, which Ikuto Yamashita designed, as a nod to the first episode of Lupin III, in which a Renault Alpine A110 appears. In the seventh episode, it was decided to have Misato drive a red Ferrari 328 GTS, while in the Rebuild of Evangelion series she drives a Mazda Cosmo Sport 110.

During the production of the series, Anno read romance novels written by women so he could better understand their feelings and make Misato's characterization more realistic. He also relied on his personality, as well as with all characters in the series. The staff also relied on Anno to create the room and the character's handwriting. Anno himself stated during the production of the series: "I don't know what will happen to Shinji, Misato or Rei. I don't know where life will take them. Because I don't know where life is taking the staff of the production." In some proposals put forward by animator and screenwriter Mitsuo Iso, Misato and Ritsuko would have become pregnant as part of a plan to address the severe birthrate decline in the Evangelion world following Second Impact. In the finale, Misato, in Gendo's absence, would have attempted to rebuild Nerv during a difficult time. Together with Shinji, she would have deciphered the final code of Arqa, an ancient ruin located deep within Nerv's headquarters, and then escaped with Shinji.

Several character-centered fan service scenes were added in the early episodes, particularly exploiting the "Gainax bounce", a jerking of the female characters' breasts which had been used in Daicon IV and other previous Gainax works. At the end of almost all post-credit previews of the episodes, the authors also inserted Misato's voice shouting "Service, service!" or equivalent expressions, promising more fan service to the otaku audience. This was removed from the second half of the series, which has more adult and violent content than the first half. In the same episodes, Anno included some sex scenes, breaking a taboo in Japanese television, although Evangelion was broadcast on TV Tokyo in a protected time slot, with the idea of wanting to show the audience, and more particularly children, that sex and violence are an integral part of human life. In the twentieth episode, "Weaving a Story 2: oral stage", Anno introduced an implied sequence with a long off-screen shot of Misato uttering verses of pleasure and arguing while having sex with her lover, Ryōji Kaji. The character's words were left up to Mitsuishi's sensibilities; the script had only Anno's direction that read, "Mitsuishi, I look forward to working with you". For the series finale, he decided instead to have Misato die in an armed confrontation and inserted a scene in which her bloody corpse is glimpsed for a few seconds; due to time constraints, the main plot of the series was abandoned, and the episode script was quickly rewritten. The corpse scene was revived in 1997 for the film Neon Genesis Evangelion: The End of Evangelion, a remake of the classic series finale. Anno, while facing criticism, defended himself by saying he wanted to show younger viewers that the world contains frightening realities, arguing that contemporary society and television tend to shield children from them. He argued that children's programs should contain a certain amount of "poison", enabling young viewers to become "immune" to the hardships of life. He also contrasted this with his own childhood, recalling that he grew up surrounded by reminders of death and by adults marked by the experience of war.

=== Voice actors ===
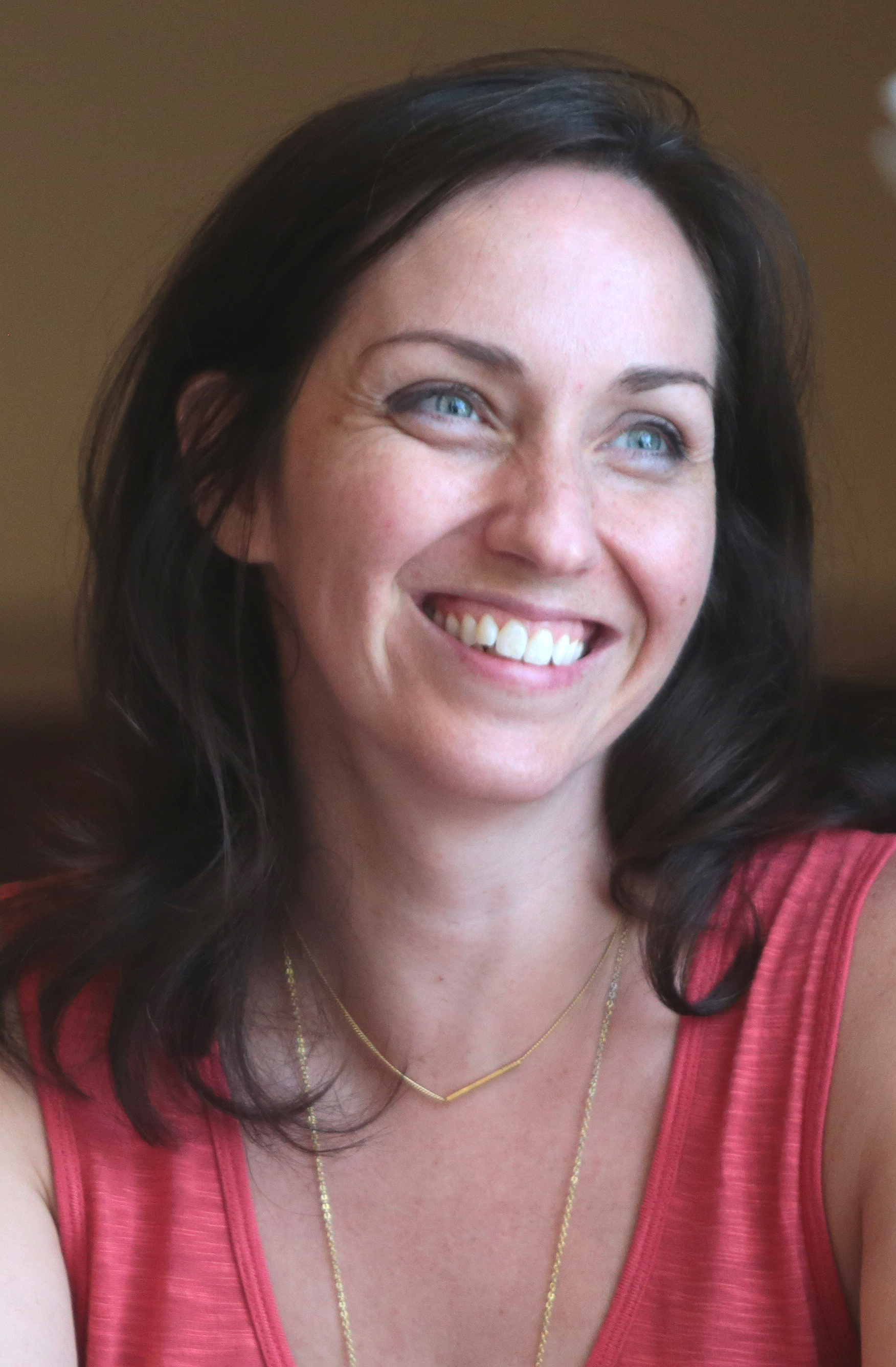
Carrie Keranen voiced Misato in the Netflix dub.

In Japanese dubbing, Misato is played by Japanese voice actress Kotono Mitsuishi. Like other Neon Genesis Evangelion voice actors, Hideaki Anno chose Mitsuishi because of her Misato-like personality during a dinner. To draw parallels between them, the writers decided to match the birthdays and blood types of the character and her voice actress. Mitsuishi found the role both pleasing and difficult, because Misato cannot easily talk about her feelings. According to Mitsuishi, "During scenes where her feelings exploded or she poured out her heart, I also became a bit over-emotional ... My hands shook and it took all my might to keep the script I was holding from rustling and making noise". She cried while reading the script of the penultimate episode. For the character's last scene in The End of Evangelion, in which Misato says goodbye to Shinji by leading him into an elevator, Mitsuishi received approval as early as the first cut.

Mitsuishi reprised the role for the video game Neon Genesis Evangelion: Girlfriend of Steel 2nd and the film tetralogy Rebuild of Evangelion, produced ten years after the conclusion of the classic series. During the recording of the first chapter Evangelion: 1.0 You Are (Not) Alone (2007), Mitsuishi was asked to strain her voice to sound younger due to the time elapsed between the works. For the third chapter in the saga Evangelion: 3.0 You Can (Not) Redo (2012), which is set fourteen years after the first, Hideaki Anno asked her to act naturally and to be as cold as possible. Working on You Can (Not) Redo, Mitsuishi asked the production what had happened to Misato, but no one gave her an explanation; she assumed something terrible had happened to the character and read her own lines as though everything was Shinji's fault. In the concluding chapter of the saga Evangelion: 3.0+1.0 Thrice Upon a Time (2021), Anno used theatrical techniques to ensure even in Misato's case the camera did not point at her face in particularly heavy scenes so Mituishi's interpretation would not be affected by her lip-reading. As Mitsuishi prepared for the character's last scene, she cried so much at the sight of the script she could not continue.

In the English adaptation of the series and Rebuild of Evangelion she is voiced by Allison Keith, while for the international Netflix release of the series she is dubbed by Carrie Keranen.

== Appearances ==
=== Neon Genesis Evangelion ===
At the beginning of the anime, Misato is the Captain of the Tactical Operations Department of the special agency Nerv. Under her command, most of the important decisions in the battles between the Evangelion mechas and the enemies known as Angels are made, and she takes responsibility for the outcomes. Her past is explored in the twelfth and twenty-first episodes of the series. At the age of thirteen, Misato followed her father Dr. Katsuragi on a scientific research expedition to the South Pole. On September 13, 2000, a natural disaster known as Second Impact occurs in Antarctica; all members of the expedition, including Dr. Katsuragi, die in the accident. Misato, the only survivor, is rescued by her parent in an escape pod. Shortly before his death, her father gives her a pendant in the shape of a Greek cross. The event causes Misato emotional trauma, which causes her to fall into a state of psychogenic aphasia. To prevent an information leak on the Second Impact, she is detained in a research ship for at least two years.

Five years after the catastrophe, Misato heals and enrolls in the university in the city of Tokyo-2, where she meets the student Ritsuko Akagi. In the same period, she meets Ryoji Kaji, with whom she forms a romantic relationship that lasts two years. In 2009, after finishing her university studies, Misato joins the German division of a research center called Gehirn and meets Asuka Langley Soryu, a pilot assigned to command the Eva-02. She is later transferred to the Nerv special agency and returns to Japan, where she is promoted to the rank of Captain. In 2015, she picks up Shinji Ikari, a pilot assigned to command the Eva-01, escorting him to the Nerv headquarters in the city of Tokyo-3 in the first episode, "Angel Attack". After a short time, the woman becomes his legal guardian, hosting him in her apartment with her pet penguin Pen-Pen.

During a trip on the United Nations naval fleet, Misato meets Kaji and Asuka again. Shortly after, she takes Asuka into custody, and thanks to her contribution other Angels are destroyed. Meanwhile, Misato encounters Kaji at work and tries to avoid him with a contradictory attitude, but they eventually become closer with time and form a romantic relationship again. After other war operations and the destruction of more enemies, Misato is promoted from Captain to Major. As events progress, however, Misato becomes suspicious of Ryoji, whom she discovers is a spy for the Japanese government. Misato discovers a giant anthropomorphic being, which Kaji identifies as the first Angel, Adam, which is responsible for the Second Impact, is being kept in the Nerv headquarters. Misato, shaken by the discovery, begins to doubt the real intentions of the Nerv and those of her friend Ritsuko Akagi, director of the technical department of the organization. Sometime later, Kaji dies, and Misato begins to persistently search for the truth about Second Impact and a plan known as the Human Instrumentality Project. With the help of her subordinate Makoto Hyuga, she gathers secret information about the intentions of the Human Instrumentality Project.

In the movie The End of Evangelion, she realizes that Seele, the organization that secretly runs Nerv, aims to execute the Human Instrumentality Project to force a human evolution and collectivize all of humanity into a single consciousness via a cataclysmic event called the Third Impact. Shortly after, Seele orders the Japanese Strategic Self-Defense Forces to attack Nerv headquarters and execute all personnel, including Shinji, Rei, and Asuka. During the attack, Misato tries to get Shinji to safety and persuade him to go to the battlefield, but she is mortally wounded and dies before the start of the Human Instrumentality.

=== Rebuild of Evangelion ===
Further differences in the story and characterization of Misato appear in the Rebuild of Evangelion film tetralogy. During production, Anno wanted to assign her the role of co-protagonist of the Rebuild alongside Shinji, changing her personality. The feature film Evangelion: 1.0 You Are (Not) Alone (2007) almost exactly follows the first six episodes of Neon Genesis Evangelion; Misato, as in the fourth episode of the classic series "Hedgehog's Dilemma", after the battle against the Angel Shamshel, scolds Shinji during a private conversation but when she leaves Shinji she slaps herself. In Rebuild, Misato is aware of the presence of the second Angel Lilith in the Nerv headquarters, and reveals its existence to Shinji just before the battle against Ramiel. Before Operation Yashima, Shinji asks Misato why he was chosen as a pilot. Misato, holding his hand, replies that there is no particular reason and that gives him a valid reason to continue piloting and fighting for the salvation of mankind. During the operation against the Angel Ramiel she also urges Commander Ikari to trust his son and allow him to continue fighting.

In the second installment of the saga, Evangelion: 2.0 You Can (Not) Advance (2009), Misato appears less cautious and less reserved than in the original version; during the feature film, she pushes Shinji to get closer to his father Gendo and begins to emotionally talk with Asuka. At the end of the movie, during the battle against the tenth Angel, Misato encourages Shinji to save Rei Ayanami from danger, even though she is aware of the risks. In Evangelion: 3.0 You Can (Not) Redo (2012), set fourteen years after the previous one, Misato plays the role of head of an organization named Wille, which was created to destroy the Nerv, as well as captain of a flying ship called AAA Wunder. She maintains a cold attitude towards Shinji to keep him from getting close to his father again and from piloting an Evangelion unit. In the final feature film of the saga, Evangelion: 3.0+1.0 Thrice Upon a Time (2021), Misato travels with the crew of AAA Wunder to Antarctica, the epicenter of the Second Impact, to attempt to neutralize a unit called Eva-13. Here, Shinji asks Misato to pilot the Eva-01 to stop the antagonist, Commander Ikari; a member of the Wille Sakura Suzuhara tries to shoot Shinji, but Misato covers him. Misato reconciles with her subordinate and remains alone on board AAA Wunder, sacrificing herself to stop Gendo's plans. In the course of the story, it is also revealed that her partner Kaji died to stop the Third Impact and in the interval between 2.0 and 3.0, she gave birth to their son, also named Kaji, who grows up without knowing his mother by her own will.

=== Other media ===
In a scene in the last episode of the animated series, a parallel universe with a different backstory than all previous episodes is presented; in the alternative reality, Misato is a teacher of Asuka's and Shinji's class. Second Impact did not occur so she also does not appear to have undergone a childhood trauma or been to the South Pole. A similar version is presented in some spin-offs of Neon Genesis Evangelion, such as Neon Genesis Evangelion: Angelic Days and Neon Genesis Evangelion: Shinji Ikari Raising Project, which are set in the alternative reality of the last episode; Neon Genesis Evangelion: Campus Apocalypse and the ONA Petit Eva: Evangelion@School, a parody of the original animated series. In Petit Eva, Misato teaches Japanese literature and lives alone rather than being Shinji's roommate.

In addition to video games based on the original animated series, Misato is also used in media outside the Neon Genesis Evangelion franchise, such as the video games Monster Strike, Super Robot Wars, Tales of Zestiria, Puzzle & Dragons, Keri hime sweets, Summons Board, Pazudora, Puyopuyo!! Quest, The Battle Cats, and in an episode of the anime Shinkansen Henkei Robo Shinkalion.

== Characterization and themes ==
=== Personality and relationships ===
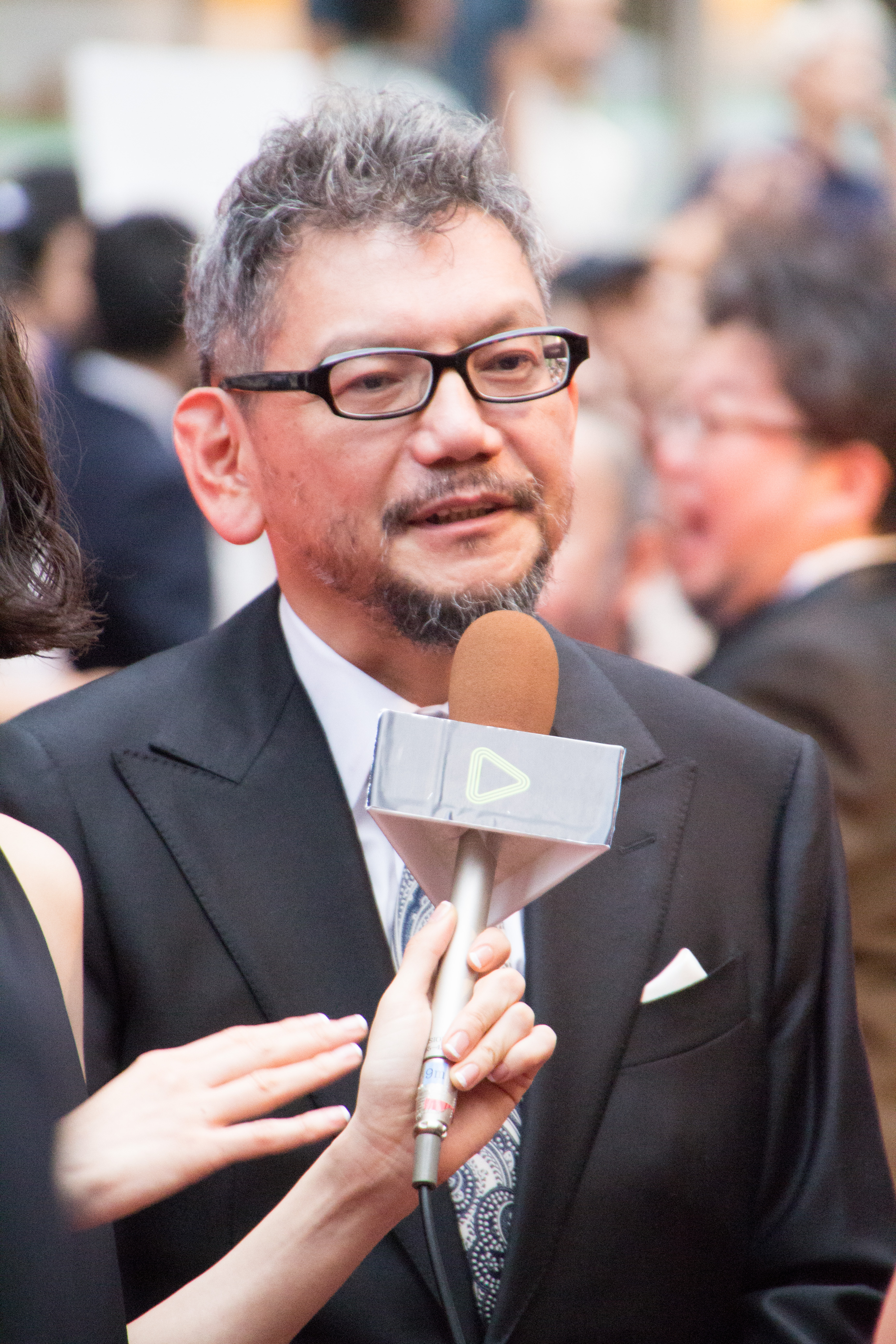
Series creator Hideaki Anno

Misato wears several social masks and has a dual personality; one as a lively, superficial young woman and the other as a resolute, stubborn, professional woman. She presents herself with a cheerful, optimistic, exuberant, and frivolous character. In her private life, Misato is sloppy and untidy; her apartment is always chaotic and disorganized, and is full of beer cans and car magazines. At work, however, she shows seriousness, demonstrating emotional coldness. Her affectionate personality sometimes makes her prioritize human feelings over her duty as a Nerv employee, and her job position arouses internal conflict and leads her to make difficult choices. Despite her open, spontaneous character, Misato hides her true feelings; voice actress Mitsuishi described her as an insecure, lonely woman who tries to hide "the loneliness and darkness deep within her heart". Hideaki Anno wanted to portray Misato as an eternal teenager who, despite childhood traumas and a difficult experience, begins a process of inner analysis through which she builds her own psychologically acceptable reality, in which the fears of the past coexist with everyday life. Moreover, according to Anno himself, Misato's psychology would lead mentally infantile people to identify with her.

Misato adopts an older-sister-like attitude toward the male protagonist of the series, Shinji, trying to deal with his problems in a frank and serene way. When Shinji arrives at Nerv's headquarters, Misato immediately sees his potential as a pilot, a selfish consideration that later causes her a strong sense of guilt. At the beginning of their relationship she tries to show herself as casual and carefree, in an attempt to convey to him a certain maternal attitude and human warmth. This rough attitude initially irritates Shinji. After the initial embarrassment, however, Shinji understands Misato's true motives, as she shows him her helpless, rough side because she trusts him and considers him a member of her family. Hideaki Anno described Misato as a twenty-nine-year-old woman who "lives life so lightly as to barely allow the possibility of a human touch". According to Anno, she protects herself by maintaining only superficial relationships and by running away from emotional intimacy. He also drew a parallel between Misato and Shinji, arguing that both are "extremely afraid of being hurt" and therefore lack the positive attitude traditionally associated with adventure heroes. Nevertheless, Anno concluded that, despite these shortcomings, "they are the heroes of this story".

According to Kazuya Tsurumaki, assistant director of Neon Genesis Evangelion, in early episodes Misato and Shinji talk while maintaining a detached, laconic attitude without looking at each other; Misato speaks to Shinji without entering his room "like they [are] looking through a slightly opened door, but not connecting". Yūichirō Oguro, co-editor of home video editions of the series, noted how in Evangelion the characters tend to avoid making eye contact in the early episodes, including Misato and Ritsuko, while in the second episode Shinji and Misato make direct eye contact several times. With time, they become emotionally closer. In the twelfth episode, Misato tells Shinji about the bitter relationship she had with her father and her reasons for joining Nerv, identifying with Shinji and his relationship with his father Gendo. A relationship of mutual esteem grows between Misato and Shinji, and she develops an attachment to him. Misato's relationship with Shinji has been compared to that between a mother and her son; an older sister and a younger brother; an adult and a child; a superior and a subordinate; and between two lovers.

Several critics have noted that Misato and Shinji's relationship simultaneously combines maternal and sexual elements at the same time. The Guardian's Anne Billson noted that Misato frequently thrusts her bosom or bottom at Shinji, but "these glimpses are from Shinji's point of view". Shinji Higuchi, a staff member of the series, described their relationship as "a temporary relationship that could fade away at any time". In an interview, Hideaki Anno said he was unsure whether Kaji is the person Misato loves the most; Misato, in his opinion, could not be happy staying with Kaji and "could fall in love with Shinji". In a scene in the twenty-third episode, "Rei III", Misato enters Shinji's bedroom after the death of his classmate Rei Ayanami. Misato tries to touch his hand and comfort him, but he shrugs off her touch; the filmbooks of the series suggest that she may be about to offer him sex in the scene to comfort him and compensate for her loneliness. Evangelion Chronicle, an official encyclopedia about the series, argues that Shinji rejects Misato because she merely tries to use him as a distraction and that he "is sensitive to this kind of deception". Gainax's staff, by contrast, reported that Hideaki Anno reacted angrily when he learned that audiences had interpreted the scene in a sexual way. According to an official pamphlet of The End of Evangelion, Misato is in many ways Shinji's "first woman". In the film The End of Evangelion, Misato and Shinji say goodbye for the last time; Misato kisses Shinji on the lips and gives him her cross-shaped pendant. Oguro noted that the penultimate episode of the series analyzes Misato and the reasons for her lively, action-oriented behavior are revealed, while in The End of Evangelion she again becomes the focus of the action but dies in an attempt to save Shinji and with an opposite portrayal to that of the classic series finale. For Oguro, as for Anno, Misato would be accustomed to superficial interpersonal relationships, but according to Oguro in the finale she may have tried for the first time "to get involved with others".

=== Cultural references and psychoanalysis ===
Like other characters in Neon Genesis Evangelion, Misato has a difficult past, a complicated relationship with her separated parents, relationship difficulties, and emotional trauma. Her suffering and torments are rooted in her relationship with her father Dr. Katsuragi, who neglected his wife's needs and those of his daughter but sacrificed himself to save Misato's life. The disappearance of her father caused her psychic trauma, leading her to become mute for several years and to act in an unhealthy manner towards other men. While trying not to live in her father's shadow, Misato finds herself following his life path; once she overcomes her aphasia, Misato enters the Nerv trying to destroy the Angels, which she accuses of having killed her father, to take her personal revenge and dispel what she calls her father's "curse". She also uses sex to feel loved and valued. Critics have associated character traits of Shinji and Misato with borderline personality disorder; Misato is impulsive, sexually promiscuous, and is frightened of being abandoned, much like a person with the mood disorder. Misato is also the focus of some epistemological reflections already present in earlier Gainax works. In the seventh and twelfth episodes, Misato is optimistic about the potential of humans, emphasizing the limits of science and probabilistic predictions. Her philosophical position is summarized in one of her mottoes; "The value of a miracle becomes real only after the miracle has been performed" which, in addition to rejecting a fatalistic and resigned attitude, refers to her personal experience, having been miraculously saved by her father at the South Pole. Equivalent expressions can be found in the sixth episode of Gunbuster and in the twenty-first episode of Nadia: The Secret of Blue Water, both of which Anno directed. She relies on human intuition and both theoretical and empirical knowledge to carry out her plans, as exemplified in the seventh episode. For this reason, writer David Fajardo-Chica described her as the series' heroine. For writer Dennis Redmond, Misato is based on Nadia Arwol from Nadia: The Secret of Blue Water while Akio Nagatomi of The Animé Café compared her to Kazumi Amano from Gunbuster. The theme of conflict with paternal figures is also present in Anno's previous works.

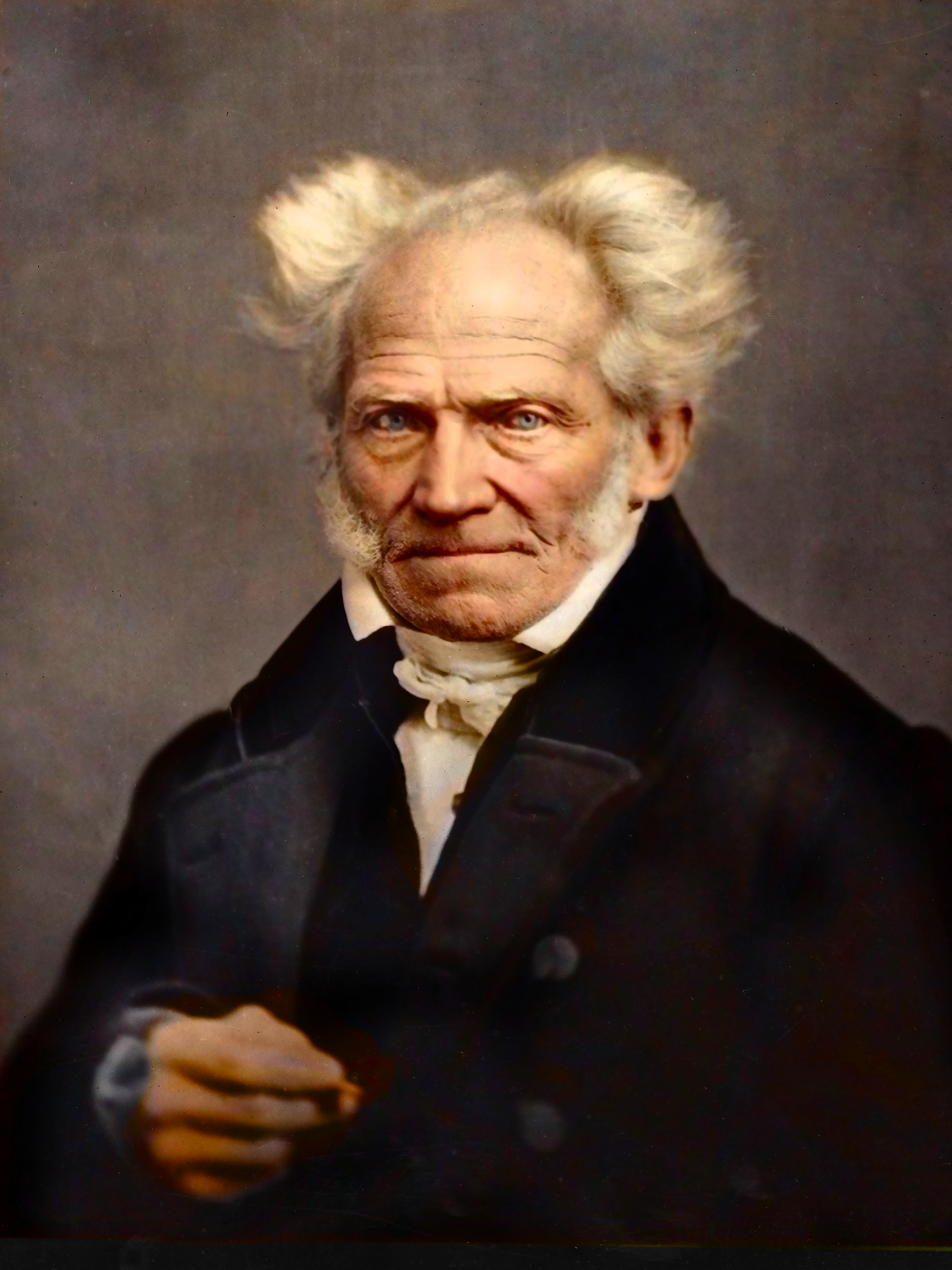
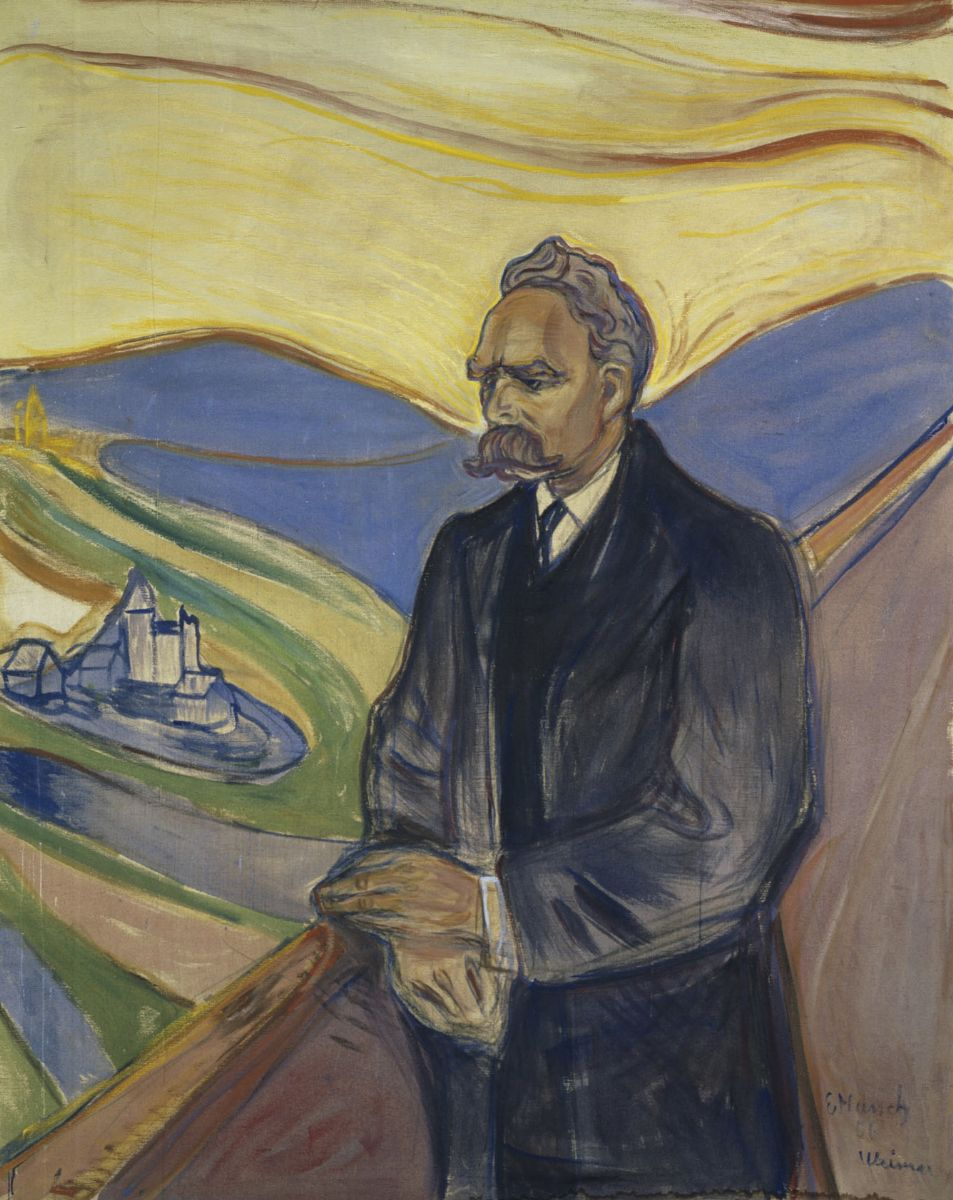
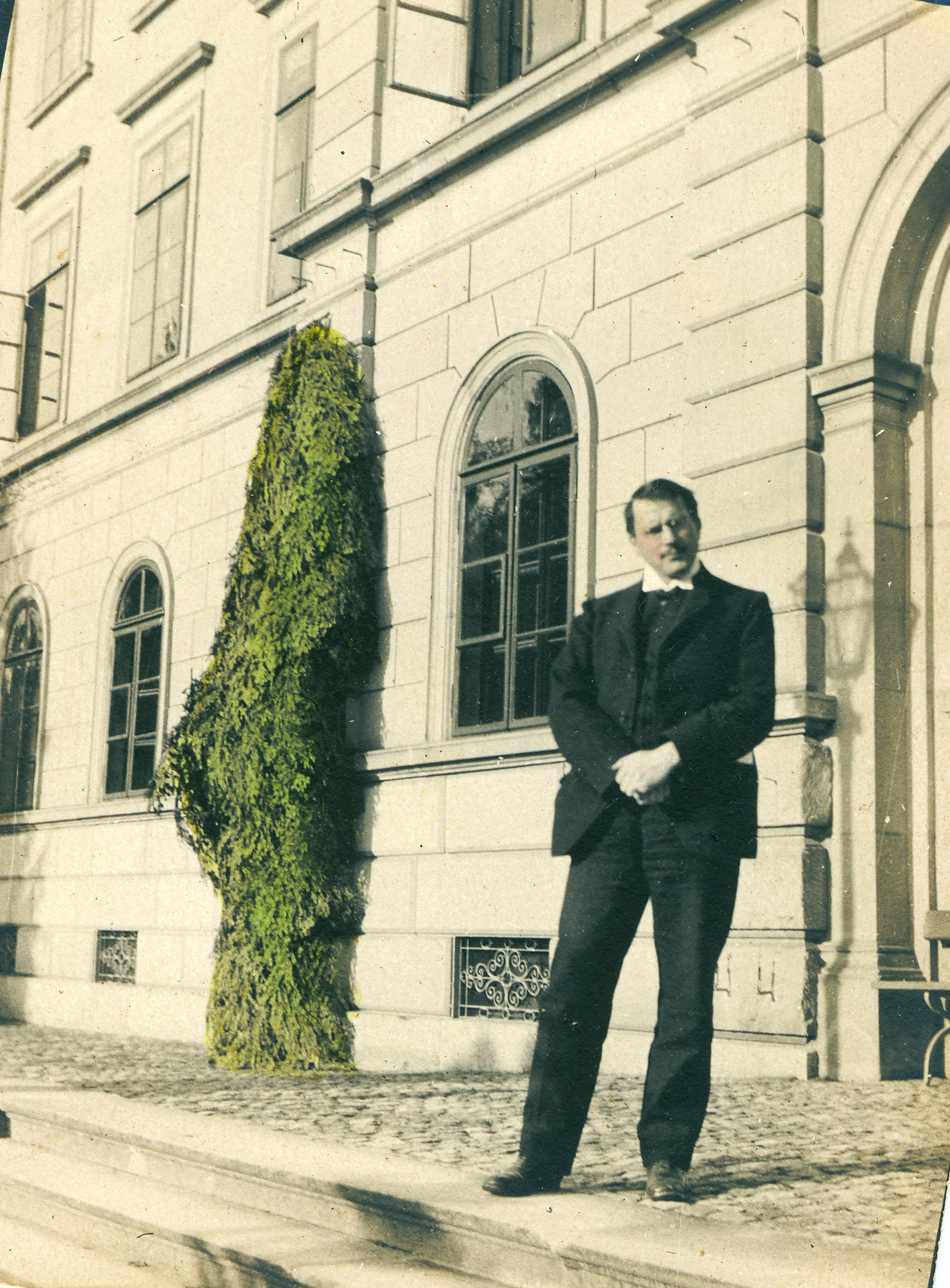
In analyzing Misato, critics have used concepts formulated by Arthur Schopenhauer, Friedrich Nietzsche and Carl Gustav Jung.

Misato's attitude has been attributed to an Electra complex, a psychological concept formulated by Carl Gustav Jung; she unconsciously looks for her father in the figure of Kaji to fill the void caused by the disappearance of her parent. After being in a relationship for two years, noticing the unconscious motives behind her attitudes and intimidated by the similarity between the two men, she decides to leave Kaji with an excuse. Virginie Nebbia compared Misato's paternal attraction toward Kaji to Sigmund Freud's Oedipus complex. She also noted that similar father-centered themes recur in Hideaki Anno's earlier works. In Gunbuster, for example, Noriko continues to look up to her physically absent father, while Nadia in The Secret of Blue Water has a conflicted relationship with her father, Captain Nemo.

In the third episode of the series, Misato discusses Arthur Schopenhauer's hedgehog's dilemma with her friend Ritsuko Akagi, highlighting her views on human relationships and communication, according to which growing up is a constant attempt to get closer and further away from each other. She and Shinji hurt each other like Schopenhauer's hedgehogs but continue to need each other to avoid suffocating in loneliness. Both characters are gripped by torments, fears and social difficulties. Misato, herself a victim of the dilemma, is unable to openly express her feelings and during the fourth episode she rejects Shinji. In the final sequence of the episode, however, the two characters seem to become closer without hurting each other, overcoming Schopenhauer's dilemma. In the twenty-fifth episode, Misato issues a long inner monologue, during which her internal conflicts and repressed memories resurface. During her childhood, she tried to be, in her own words, a "good girl" and to help her mother, who was also neglected by her father, but once she became an adult she felt disgusted at her servile behavior. This led her to want to "get dirty" through her close sexual relationship with Kaji, the only person to whom she seems to genuinely show herself. Although she rejects Human Instrumentality, through which the souls of all human beings would unite into one complete being, she yearns for "peace", seeking refuge in the figure of Kaji.

Anthony Gramuglia of Anime Feminist, analyzing Misato's characterization and lifestyle, made a parallelism with the Japanese Lost Generation and Millennials, who after the bursting of the Japanese asset price bubble had difficulty finding housing and tend to be underpaid for the amount of work they do. Anime Feminist writer Jeremy Tauber also observed that Misato lives in a cramped, cluttered apartment with cheap ramen and beer cans, arguing that "with all of its technological fantasia, the world of Evangelion is a lost, barren, impoverished landscape". Italian researcher Fabio Bartoli noted a dichotomy between the characters of Misato and Ritsuko, associating Misato with the Nietzschean Dionysian spirit, to the sephirah Cochkmah and to the father—her parental figure of reference—and Ritsuko with the Apollonian spirit, to Binah and the mother, to whom she seems to be more attached. According to Jake Potter, Misato is a perfect example of Existentialist philosopher Søren Kierkegaard's definition of despair in The Sickness Unto Death, since her true suffering arises not from Kaji's death or the conflict and loss surrounding her father, but from the fact that "her self is broken". According to the book Neon Genesis Evangelion: The Unofficial Guide, Misato's name contains the Japanese word ミサ (misa), which can be translated as "mass", a possible reference to her dark clothing and the cross-shaped pendant she wears around her neck. Virginie Nebbia observed that Misato and the other female characters in Evangelion are portrayed realistically as vibrant individuals, in contrast to male figures such as Seele, who long for death. She attributed this contrast to Hideaki Anno's personal fondness for shōjo manga, comics primarily aimed at a female audience. Critics have nevertheless noted that the series frequently sexualizes Misato and places her at the center of fan service aimed at the young male otaku audience, particularly in the early episodes.

== Cultural impact ==
=== Popularity ===
Cosplay of Misato in 2023

The character of Misato has been ranked in several popularity polls, in different categories, placing among the most popular Neon Genesis Evangelion characters. After the conclusion of the series, Misato ranked eighth among the most-popular female characters of the moment in the 1996 Anime Grand Prix, a large annual survey conducted by the Japanese magazine Animage. In the next two Anime Grand Prix, she stayed in the top twenty; in 1997 she remained in eighth place, while in 1998 she dropped to thirteenth. Misato also remained in the magazine's monthly rankings throughout 1997, consistently placing among the thirty most-popular characters. In 1998, the magazine placed her twenty-seventh among the most-popular anime characters. Moreover, according to Animerica magazine, Misato's popularity led her to become the most-popular female character in the series in the United States, surpassing Rei Ayanami and Asuka.

=== Critical reception ===
Critics have been generally positive about Misato's character. Anime reviewers praised the characterisation and psychology of the character. According to writer Kazuhisa Fujie, she is "the most elaborately described character in Evangelion". Japanese website Niconico ranked her first among animated characters that are most suited to the role of big sister, appreciating both her messy, affectionate, homely attitude and her military skills. Crunchyroll's Kara Dennison called her an extremely "under-appreciated" character. The website Urban Cinefile described her as a "daring, decisive, innovative" character. The websites Screen Rant and Comic Book Resources ranked Misato among the best characters in the series. According to Ritwik Mitra of Screen Rant; "One of the important women in Shinji's life and a great character in her own right, Misato is ... one of the more intriguing characters in the entire show, and a treat to watch during some of the more impactful moments in Neon Genesis Evangelion".

Other reviewers expressed criticism for her characterization. Anime News Network reviewer Kenneth Lee found her characterization ineffective, writing about the lack of convincing explanations about Misato's emergence from her years of aphasia. Comic Book Resources's Theo Kogod criticized her decision to take Asuka and Shinji into custody. Further criticism was aimed at some scenes in the twentieth episode, in which Misato has sexual intercourse with Kaji, and some of her sexually implied approaches to fourteen-year-old Shinji. Emily Auten of Nerdmuch.com and Brittany Vincenti of Geek.com, on the other hand, expressed positive opinions of her relationship with Kaji. Comic Book Resources' Ajay Aravind noted the kiss between Shinji and Misato as one of the scenes that changed Japanese animation; his colleague Devin Meenan described it as "one of the most beautiful" scenes of The End of Evangelion. For 25 Years Later's Alex Boruff, the relationship between Shinji and Misato is Evangelion's most important, and it "doesn't fit into any conventional archetypes of relationships"; according to Boruff, "part of what makes their dynamic so fascinating is the ambiguity of it".

Misato's role in the Rebuild of Evangelion saga also drew criticism and praise from reviewers. For Comic Book Resources's Angelos Delos Trinos, her characterization in Rebuild is minimal when compared "to her depth and nuance" in the classic series. Anime Reign magazine also expressed a negative opinion, deeming her role underexplored and shadowy. The website Japanator expresses a contrary opinion, saying it is "fascinating to see Misato unchained from the shackles of Nerv", emphasizing the consistency of the changes and finding them relevant to the spirit of Rebuild of Evangelion. The reception of Misato's role in the last installment of the saga Evangelion: 3.0+1.0 Thrice Upon a Time (2021) was more positive. For IGN's Hanrique Padula, Misato and the show's other characters would, in the film, gain facets never seen before, reaching points never reached in the original series. Comic Book Resources' Reuben Baron also welcomed the revelations presented in the feature film, saying, "3.0+1.01 also fills in enough details about Misato's experiences during the time skip [in 3.0] to give her a more convincing emotional arc".

=== Legacy and merchandise ===
Misato's character has been used for merchandising items, such as toys, collectible models, action figures, alcohol, eyewear, gun holsters and clothing items. In June 2009, Bandai Namco Entertainment and Cellius released a program called "The Misato Katsuragi News Project", in which the character Misato announced the most important news of the day via a voice simulator. The program remained active until June of the following year. Misato was also used in advertising campaigns for the Japan Racing Association and features on the 500 Type Eva, a high-speed train dedicated to Neon Genesis Evangelion.

Misato is parodied in the manga Jujutsu Kaisen, which has a reference to the photograph she gives Shinji in the first episode of the series. Actress Natsuki Kato has paid homage to Misato by cosplaying her; in 2015, she dressed as Misato during an official announcement by the Hakuto team of a space mission to send a miniature replica of Longinus' spear to the Moon. Hiroyasu Ishida, director of Penguin Highway, cited Misato as one of the influences for Aoyama's older sister, the feature film's protagonist. According to Kazuya Tsurumaki, Sadamoto may have initially thought of Misato for the conception of FLCL's Haruko Haruhara. Attack on Titan author Hajime Isayama drew Mikasa Ackerman's name from the warship of the same name, thinking of Misato's surname or those of Ritsuko or Yuki Nagato from The Melancholy of Haruhi Suzumiya, all of which came from warships, with the idea that similar names would bring success to the characters.

Critics have found similarities to Misato in later female anime characters, including Talho Yūki from Eureka Seven by her way of drinking beer and Haruka Shitow from RahXephon for her maternal attitude toward the series' protagonist, Kamina. Anime News Network' Gabriella Ekens compared Misato to Chain Sumeragi from Blood Blockade Battlefront, as both sensual, career women with comic moments; she also noticed that Kazuki Kuwanomi from Plastic Memories is "often framed in ways that resemble Misato". Her colleague Jason Green similarly traced Misato's influence on the characterization of Yoko Littner from Gurren Lagann, particularly in the use of "Gainax bounce" fan service.
