= List of Neon Genesis Evangelion films =

Neon Genesis Evangelion (新世紀エヴァンゲリオン, Shin Seiki Evangerion) is a Japanese multi-media anime franchise created by Japanese animator and filmmaker Hideaki Anno in 1994. Since 1997, there have been 7 theatrical films based on the franchise including the original trilogy produced by Gainax, directly following the original TV series, and later the Rebuild of Evangelion, a four-movie series made as a retelling of the Neon Genesis Evangelion series, made by Anno's own studio, Khara.

== Films ==
English Title	Japanese Title	Original release date	Director(s)	Writers(s)	Production Companies	Distributed By
Neon Genesis Evangelion Theatrical Edition
Neon Genesis Evangelion: Death & Rebirth	新世紀エヴァンゲリオン 劇場版 シト新生; Shin Seiki Evangerion Gekijō-ban Shi to Shinsei	March 15, 1997	Hideaki Anno; Masayuki; Kazuya Tsurumaki	Hideaki Anno; Akio Satsukawa	Gainax; Tatsunoko Production ("Death"); Production I.G. ("Rebirth")	Toei Company
The End of Evangelion	新世紀エヴァンゲリオン劇場版 Air/まごころを、君に; Shin Seiki Evangerion Gekijō-ban Eā/Magokoro wo, Kimi ni	July 19, 1997	Hideaki Anno ("Sincerely Yours"); Kazuya Tsurumaki ("Air")	Hideaki Anno	Gainax; Production I.G.	Toei Company
Rebuild of Evangelion
Evangelion: 1.0 You Are (Not) Alone	ヱヴァンゲリヲン新劇場版: 序 Evangerion Shin Gekijō-ban: Jo	September 1, 2007	Hideaki Anno; Masayuki; Kazuya Tsurumaki	Hideaki Anno	Studio Khara	The KlockWorx
Evangelion: 2.0 You Can (Not) Advance	ヱヴァンゲリヲン新劇場版: 破 Evangerion Shin Gekijō-ban: Ha	June 27, 2009	Hideaki Anno; Masayuki; Kazuya Tsurumaki	Hideaki Anno	Studio Khara	The KlockWorx
Evangelion: 3.0 You Can (Not) Redo	ヱヴァンゲリヲン新劇場版: Q Evangerion Shin Gekijō-ban: Kyū	November 17, 2012	Hideaki Anno; Mahiro Maeda; Kazuya Tsurumaki; Masayuki	Hideaki Anno	Studio Khara	Toei Company
Evangelion: 3.0+1.0 Thrice Upon a Time	シン・エヴァンゲリオン劇場版: 𝄂 Shin Evangerion Gekijō-ban: 𝄂	March 8, 2021	Hideaki Anno; Kazuya Tsurumaki; Katsuichi Nakayama; Mahiro Maeda	Hideaki Anno	Studio Khara	Toho; Toei Company

== Neon Genesis Evangelion Theatrical Edition ==
The Theatrical Edition films of Neon Genesis Evangelion consist of summary versions of episodes 1 to 24, and has two installments that create a different ending from the original Neon Genesis Evangelion.

The film duology consists of "Death" from Episode 1 to 24, and Episode 25 "Air" ("Rebirth" is only the first half of this), Episode 26 "Sincerity, Kimi ni".

=== Neon Genesis Evangelion: Death & Rebirth ===
Neon Genesis Evangelion: Death & Rebirth, is a 1997 Japanese animated science fiction psychological drama film and the first installment of the Neon Genesis Evangelion feature film project and consists of two parts. The project, whose overarching title translates literally to New Century Gospel: The Movie, was released in response to the success of the TV series and a strong demand by fans for an alternate ending. Its components have since been re-edited and re-released several times.

The first section, Evangelion:Death, is a recap, editing together scenes from the first 24 episodes of Neon Genesis Evangelion in the form of a clip show, along with additional animation created after the show's original broadcast. This includes scenes from the original show re-drawn shot-for-shot, entirely new shots augmenting existing sequences, and linking segments based around the premise of the four main characters playing Pachelbel's Canon as a string quartet.

In 2004, ADV films released Neon Genesis Evangelion - Director's Cut: Genesis Reborn for episodes 24-26 which included experimental animation similar to End of Evangelion. In 2005, Some of the additional shots and re-drawn animation would later be re-edited into the extended, 'Home Video Versions' of episodes 21–24 included on the Japanese VHS/Laserdisc and American and European Platinum Collection releases of the TV series.

Death(True)^{2}

Evangelion: Death (True)^{2} screened on the Japanese satellite TV channel WOWOW; this second cut of Evangelion:Death was re-edited by Masayuki, who held multiple creative roles throughout the franchise's production, removing some of the extra footage new to the feature. This was released on home video for the first time as part of the Archives of Evangelion DVD box set on August 26, 2015.

The second section, Evangelion: Rebirth, consists of approximately 24 minutes of entirely new animation that would eventually form the first third of the alternate ending film The End of Evangelion, released four months later as the second stage in the Neon Genesis Evangelion: Death & Rebirth project. Serving as a preview while End was still in production, Rebirth only covers the initial preparations of the Human Instrumentality Project and the invasion of the Geofront by the JSSDF, ending with the arrival of the Mass Production Evas. Because of its unfinished state, there are differences between Rebirth and the portion of the finished The End of Evangelion it covers. These differences include editing, shots that were later re-drawn entirely, and soundtrack cues that were replaced or further edited. The section ends with credits accompanied by the song "Soul's Refrain" by Yoko Takahashi.

Death and Rebirth were co-produced by Kadokawa Shoten, Gainax, TV Tokyo, Sega, and Toei Company.

Reception

The film opened in second place at the Japanese box office, just behind the opening of 101 Dalmatians. Between March and October 1997, Death and Rebirth earned a distributor rental income of ¥1.1 billion. The feature had a total gross of ¥1.87 billion.

Chris Beveridge from Mania gave it an overall "A−" score. Robert Nelson of T.H.E.M. Anime Reviews gave it a 3 out of 5. Adam Arnold from Animefringe gave the film an overall score of 72%.

Home media

On July 30, 2002, Manga Entertainment released Death and Rebirth on VHS and DVD in both dub and sub under the title Neon Genesis Evangelion: Death & Rebirth.

On July 26, 2005, Manga Entertainment released Death & Rebirth and The End of Evangelion together in the United States as a two-disc set.

The English production made similar creative changes in dubbing as had been made to The End of Evangelion. One notable change was the alteration of the sound effect between the scene featuring Kaji to one of Shinji informing Asuka of his death. According to the DVD commentary, English ADR director Amanda Winn-Lee, also the voice of Rei in the dub, felt the sound was not a proper "gunshot" and replaced it with a more overt effect. However, the Japanese screenplay mentions that the sound effect is not a gunshot at all, but rather the sound of a slap (the following scene implies Asuka has slapped Shinji).

=== The End of Evangelion ===
The End of Evangelion is a 1997 Japanese anime science fiction film written by Hideaki Anno, directed by Anno and Kazuya Tsurumaki, and animated by Gainax and Production I.G. It serves as an alternate ending to the original series, in quite a similar way to the first movies.

The story follows teenagers Shinji Ikari, Rei Ayanami and Asuka Langley Soryu, who pilot mechas called Evangelion to defeat enemies who threaten humanity named Angels. Shinji is subjected to the Human Instrumentality Project, a process in which human souls are merged into a single divine entity. The film features the voice actors of the original series, including Megumi Ogata as Shinji, Yuko Miyamura as Asuka, and Megumi Hayashibara as Rei.

Production

Shortly before The End of Evangelion's release, Anno and Gainax released Neon Genesis Evangelion: Death and Rebirth. Like Death & Rebirth, the creators conceived The End of Evangelion as a duology comprising "Episode 25: Love Is Destructive" and "Episode 26: I Need You", remakes of the last two episodes of the original television series. In 1998, the overlapping films were edited together and reissued as Revival of Evangelion.

Reception

The End of Evangelion was a box-office success, grossing ¥2.47 billion. It was honoured at the Awards of the Japanese Academy, the Animation Kobe, and the 1997 Animage Anime Grand Prix, and was praised for its violence, direction, editing, emotional power, and script, though some reviewers criticized its oblique religious symbolism and abstraction.

The End of Evangelion was released in Japanese theaters on July 19, 1997. Pre-sales began on May 17; customers with unused tickets for Death and Rebirth were permitted to use them for the movie. Viewers were given copies of the official poster. A preview was held on July 17 at Yomiuri Hall Cinema. In 1998, the feature films Death & Rebirth (1997) and The End of Evangelion (1997), partially overlapping, were merged by removing the part in common and re-released as Revival of Evangelion, which was released in theaters on March 7, attracting 300,000 people. In 2006, The End of Evangelion was screened as part of the Tokyo International Film Festival in Akihabara. In 2014, the Revival of Evangelion version was screened at Toho Cinemas in Nihonbashi during the 27th edition of the same festival.

Home media

On August 28 and 29, 2015, to celebrate the release of the Blu-ray box set of the series, the film was played along with the first episode of Neon Genesis Evangelion ("Angel Attack") at Toho Cinema in Shinjuku, Tokyo. On December 4, 2020, it was announced a new run for Revival of Evangelion in special screenings across Japan between January 8 and 22, 2021.

Legacy

In 1997 Japan, Neon Genesis Evangelion was at the center of national debates and became a social phenomenon. It thus attracted to theaters a large number of people intrigued by the controversy surrounding the original ending. The film version also drew the attention of journalists, as well as people who were not normally interested in animation. The End of Evangelion's audience exceeded that of Death and Rebirth, drawing 400,000 viewers in the first three days. The film earned about ¥1.5 billion in Japanese distributor rentals (equivalent to about US$12 million at the time), becoming the fourth-highest-grossing Japanese feature film of 1997. Hayao Miyazaki's Princess Mononoke, also featuring mature and violent themes, was theatrically released at the same time as The End of Evangelion; Japanese media were attracted by the contrast between the two films' posters, one of which said "Live!" and The End of Evangelion which reported the line "Wouldn't it be nice if everyone would just die?"

Like the original series, which includes cultural references to philosophy and psychology, a great deal of information was added in The End of Evangelion, in a style called "pedantic" in official materials. Anno inserted terms to create atmosphere and make it seem as though there is something deeper behind it so, in his own words, he could sound "intelligent". Throughout the film, religious elements of Judaism and Christianity are mentioned, such as the number of the Beast from the sea 666, the tree of life, the Tree of the Sephiroth, the Catholic stigmata, the universal flood, Noah's Ark, the Genesis creation narrative, and the Book of Revelation.

==== Revival of Evangelion ====
The final stage of the New Century Gospel: The Movie project, a theatrical revival with the romanized title Revival of Evangelion was released on March 8, 1998, consisting of Death (True)² (a third, further edit of Death(True), with a few removed shots crucial to the plot edited back in) followed by a four-minute intermission and then the finished The End of Evangelion. In 2015, Revival was released on the Japanese Renewal of Evangelion Blu-ray box set along with End and the original theatrical cuts of Death and Rebirth. Death (True)² is also the version most widely released in the West, having been opted by Netflix and GKIDS for its distribution service and Blu-ray box set respectively. Death (True)² and End are separated in these Western releases, removing the intermission, but some campaigns have nevertheless collated the two under the banner Neon Genesis Evangelion: The Feature Film. The feature had a total gross of ¥2.47 billion.

== Rebuild of Evangelion ==
Rebuild of Evangelion, known in Japan and on Amazon Prime Video as Evangelion: New Theatrical Edition (ヱヴァンゲリヲン新劇場版, Evangerion Shin Gekijō-ban), is a Japanese animated film series and a retelling of the original Neon Genesis Evangelion anime television series, produced by Studio Khara. Hideaki Anno served as the writer and general manager of the project, with Kazuya Tsurumaki and Masayuki directing the films themselves. Yoshiyuki Sadamoto, Ikuto Yamashita and Shirō Sagisu returned to provide character designs, mechanical designs and music respectively.

The film tetralogy uses digital ink and paint, some computer-generated imagery, and provides new scenes, settings and characters, with a completely new conclusion in the fourth and final film. Another stated intention of the series is for it to be more accessible to non-fans than the original TV series and films were. It was made to present an alternate retelling of episodes 1–19 of the TV series (including new scenes, settings, and characters) and a completely new conclusion to the story. The first film Evangelion: 1.0 You Are (Not) Alone was released in Japan on September 1, 2007, with Evangelion: 2.0 You Can (Not) Advance and Evangelion: 3.0 You Can (Not) Redo released on June 27, 2009, and November 17, 2012, respectively. The final film, Evangelion: 3.0+1.0 Thrice Upon a Time, was released on March 8, 2021.

=== Evangelion: 1.0 You Are (Not) Alone ===
Evangelion: 1.0 You Are (Not) Alone. is a 2007 Japanese animated science fiction action film, written and chiefly directed by Hideaki Anno. It is the first installment of the tetralogy. The story, which is set in the futuristic city of Tokyo-3 fifteen years after a planetary catastrophe known as the Second Impact, focuses on Shinji Ikari, a boy who is recruited by the special agency Nerv to pilot a giant mecha known as an Eva unit and fight, along with fellow pilot Rei Ayanami, against a mysterious species named Angels. The film features the same cast of voice actors from the original series and previous movies, including Megumi Ogata as Shinji Ikari, Megumi Hayashibara as Rei Ayanami, and Kotono Mitsuishi as Misato Katsuragi. Hideaki Anno was joined in the direction by Kazuya Tsurumaki and Masayuki, both of whom were assistant directors of the original series. The storyboards were handled by Shinji Higuchi and Tomoki Kyoda.

The film, which retraces the plot of the first six episodes of the series, enjoyed a positive reception in Japan, grossing about two billion yen and generating considerable revenue for the home video market. Abroad, Evangelion: 1.0 received a more polarized reception, although generally positive; critics described it as too derivative of the classic series and claimed that it cut important details, while others praised its direction, soundtrack, and plot, with particular attention to its use of CGI graphics. The feature film also won accolades, receiving awards at, among others, the Animation Kobe and Tokyo International Anime Fair.

Hideaki Anno was assisted in the direction of You Are (Not) Alone by Masayuki and Kazuya Tsurumaki, who were assistant directors on Neon Genesis Evangelion. At the beginning of production, Anno asked Tsurumaki what he would like to do after finishing Diebuster between working on an Evangelion-related project, or on a new project about a famous anime. While confused by the question, he instinctively answered Evangelion. If Tsurumaki had refused, Anno was prepared to offer the role of assistant director to someone else, but Tsurumaki eventually accepted, albeit with reservations. Tsurumaki had regrets about the sixth episode of Neon Genesis Evangelion, "Rei II", which after the storyboard "was ordered by another company, and Gainax had no control over it", and felt he could address the issues he had with the episode. Meanwhile, Ōtsuki contacted Masayuki in February 2006. Like with the theatrical release of 1997, Masayuki was originally working on just the layout and helping with animation; however, Khara quickly promoted him to assistant director, since Tsurumaki alone could not do all the work within the production schedule.

Newtype, a Japanese pop culture magazine, claimed that Evangelion 1.0 "was greeted with the highest praise and acclaim of 2007". Matthew Roe of Anime News Network reported that the film received considerable positive feedback from fans and critics, eventually becoming one of the most praised and highest-grossing Japanese animated films of that year. Japanese critics welcomed and reviewed the feature film positively, putting emphasis on its visuals. The website Cinemarche praised the city of Tokyo-3 and the Evangelion weapons depicted in CG, describing them as "powerful images that have never been experienced before".

=== Evangelion: 2.0 You Can (Not) Advance ===
Evangelion: 2.0 You Can (Not) Advance is a 2009 Japanese animated science fiction action film directed by Kazuya Tsurumaki and Masayuki, and written by Hideaki Anno. It is the second movie of the tetralogy. The film continues the story of Evangelion: 1.0 You Are (Not) Alone, with Shinji Ikari continuing his role as a pilot of one of the gigantic Evangelion as part of NERV's ongoing fight against the mysterious creatures known as Angels. While replicating many scenes and plot elements from the original series, the film also introduces new ones, including newly designed creatures and new characters, such as Mari Illustrious Makinami, and integrates newly available 3D CG technology. Its ending paves the way for the significant storyline departures from the original series in Evangelion: 3.0 You Can (Not) Redo.

In September 2006, it was confirmed the second film produced as part of the Rebuild of Evangelion series, with a release date tentatively set for January 2008 and a 90-minute running time. In November 2006, the December edition of the Japanese anime magazine Newtype confirmed the second film was written during post-production on the first film. Anno stated the introduction of new characters and Evangelion units would begin from the second film onwards. The release date was pushed back several times from the original announcement of January 2008: first, to a December 2008 release before an update on the official website on October 6, 2008, announced the official English title and an "early summer 2009" release date. A final postponement revealed that the film would be released on June 27, 2009. Evangelion 2.0 made its International/US premiere at the Hawaii International Film Festival on October 24, 2009. The film made its Canadian premiere at Waterloo Festival for Animated Cinema on November 21, 2009. On December 3, 2009, the film was released in Hong Kong and South Korea. In Australia, the film made its premiere at the Reel Anime Festival in September 2010. The film premiered in Ireland on March 20, 2010, as a part of the Irish Film Institute Anime Weekend. The film screened on July 10, 2010, as a part of the Fantasia Film Festival in Montreal. The film made its European premiere at Lucca Comics 2009 on November 1, 2009 and was screened at the Asia Filmfest in Munich on November 6, 2009. Despite former announcements, Evangelion: 2.0 You Can (Not) Advance was not screened at the Animotion festival in Bonn because of licensing problems. The film also competed in the Sitges Film Festival in Catalonia, Spain on October 4, 2009, in the Anima't category. In North America, Cinema Asia Releasing, Eleven Arts and Funimation announced that Evangelion: 2.0 You Can (Not) Advance would premiere in the United States in January 2011. It was originally planned to premiere in 70–100 theaters. However, Funimation released a statement in December 2010 confirming that it would be released in 22 theatres.

In its opening weekend in Japan, the film reached number-one at the box office with a revenue of ¥510 million. The film subsequently grossed ¥4 billion ($43 million) at the Japanese box office in 2009, making it the year's second highest-grossing anime film. A 2020 Japan re-release grossed $433,850, totaling $43,433,850 grossed in Japan. The film's North American box office take was over $130,000, an improvement over 1.0. The film grossed $858,409 overseas by 2011, and a further $47,103 in Australia and New Zealand in 2017, for an overseas total of $905,512, bringing the film's worldwide box office gross to $44,339,362

=== Evangelion: 3.0 You Can (Not) Redo ===
Evangelion: 3.0 You Can (Not) Redo is a 2012 Japanese animated science fiction action film written and chief directed by Hideaki Anno and the third of the four films released in the Rebuild series. It was produced and co-distributed by Anno's Studio Khara and released in Japanese theaters on November 17, 2012. It was followed by the final film in the series, Evangelion: 3.0+1.0 Thrice Upon a Time, in 2021.

14 years have passed since the end of the second film, Asuka and Mari are in charge of recovering the Tesseract in which Unit 01 is sealed, when they are intercepted by the self-defence system in charge of preventing anyone from recovering the Eva. Back inside Unit 01, Shinji realizes that a lot has changed, he is now considered a criminal, held captive by his former Nerv allies who now form the Wille organization, whose unofficial goal is to destroy Nerv and prevent further impacts. Unable to find Rei Ayanami, Shinji learns that she has disappeared before being rescued by a new Rei clone and the Evangelion Mark-09. Back at Nerv HQ, he is greeted by his father who orders him to pilot Unit 13 with a co-pilot: Kaworu Nagisa. During his wandering, Shinji learns the result of his actions, the truth about his mother and about Ayanami. This is the moment Kaworu chooses to present him with his plan to cancel the third impact, but which will ultimately lead to the catastrophe of the fourth impact.

The film was released in Korean theaters in April 2013. The Japanese Blu-ray and DVD were released on April 24, 2013. The film is licensed by Funimation (North America), Madman Entertainment (Australia) and Manga Entertainment (United Kingdom) for home release on Blu-ray and DVD. The US announcement was revealed once their Facebook page reached over 1 million likes and was later provided with a release date for February 2014. However, due to more demand on theatrical screenings the home release was delayed. After numerous months with lack of information regarding both the theatrical release and home release, a FUNimation post on Facebook assured fans that they were working closely with Studio Khara to ensure the English dub is closer to Khara's vision. As a result, both the Australian and United Kingdom releases (both originally given a March 2014 release date) were postponed until the situation was sorted. In December 2014, Funimation confirmed that they intended to release Evangelion 3.33 in the near future and that Khara was creating the English-language subtitle track for the Western release of the film.

The film was released in Japan on November 17, 2012. It earned Japan's second-highest weekend box office of 2012 with ¥1,131,004,600 ($13,913,200). The film subsequently grossed ¥5,267,373,350 ($66,015,081) in Japan by the end of 2012. A 2020 Japan re-release grossed $433,850, totaling $66,448,931 grossed in Japan.

Overseas, the film grossed ₩441,165,211 ($402,945) in South Korea, $208,699 in Hong Kong and Thailand, $174,945 in the United States and Canada, and $47,103 in Australia and New Zealand, for an overseas total of $833,692. This brings the film's worldwide box office gross to $67,282,623.

=== Evangelion: 3.0+1.0 Thrice Upon a Time ===
Evangelion: 3.0+1.0 Thrice Upon a Time is a 2021 Japanese epic animated science fiction film co-directed, written and produced by Hideaki Anno. Produced by Studio Khara, it is the fourth and final film in the Rebuild film series. The film is also the third film in Anno's Shin Japan Heroes Universe, following Shin Godzilla (2016), with Shin Ultraman and Shin Kamen Rider following in 2022 and 2023 respectively.

After Shinji Ikari almost triggered the continuation of Third Impact and the world was only saved from it by the sacrifice of Kaworu Nagisa, he wanders through the devastated remains of Tokyo 3 together with the younger clone of Rei Ayanami and Asuka Langley Shikinami. Meanwhile, the battle between WILLE and NERV continues: while WILLE, under Misatos Katsuragi's leadership, gathers her forces and helps the remnants of humanity survive, Gendo Ikari works with NERV to complete the Human Instrumentality Project. The three pilots arrive at a village inhabited by humans, where they also meet Toji Suzuhara and Kensuke Aida. Unlike the EVA pilots, they have grown up since the plot of the previous movie. The three stay with them and Shinji is able to overcome his depression caused by the almost triggered Third Impact with the help of Rei Ayanami, but Rei herself cannot survive outside NERV and dies.

When given the opportunity, Shinji and Asuka go back aboard the AAA Wunder. His re-admission leads to conflict between the crew and Katsuragi, who is deemed to be too lenient towards him. They prepare for the final battle against NERV, where all preparations for the Forth Impact and Human Instrumentality have been completed. The Wunder attack NERV at the South Pole and are drawn into the Fourth Impact – just as Gendo Ikari had planned. Shinji follows him through the Gate of Guf into Minus Space, where his father's feelings and motivations are revealed to him, but he is also able to show Gendo that despite all his efforts to overcome his humanity, he still harbours human feelings and fears. By sacrificing her ship and herself, Misato is able to form a new Spear of Gaius. With her, Shinji can stop the Impact and resurrect humanity in a new creation.

Anno stated his desire to see 3.0+1.0 break the ¥10 billion mark, which he considered would be a landmark for robot anime. The film was released in Japan on March 8, 2021, earning ¥802,774,200 ($7,387,198) on its first day, outdoing its predecessor by 23.8% and breaking the IMAX opening day record in Japan. The film grossed ¥3,338,422,400 ($30,596,851) in its first week, ranking No. 1 in Japan in its opening week. In 21 days, the film sold 3,961,480 tickets and grossed ¥6,078,211,750 ($55,492,310) in Japan, outdoing 3.0's total earnings of ¥5.3 billion. In 30 days, it surpassed ¥7 billion ($63.77 million), completing four weeks as #1 in Japanese box offices. On May 8, it surpassed Shin Godzilla and became Anno's highest-grossing film at ¥8.28 billion ($75.72 million). With the 3.0+1.01 updated release on June 12, the film jumped back to top box office spot after spending a weekend out of the top 10 chart and on June 15, exactly the 100th day since release, achieving a 960.5% increase, reached ¥9 billion ($81.7 million). On July 13, it was announced that the film has exceeded ¥10 billion, becoming the first ever film distributed by Toei to hit this box office milestone and ending its theatrical run on July 21 pocketing ¥10.23 billion with an attendance number of 6.69 million people, finishing with almost double as its predecessor's ¥5.3 billion mark. Japanese Twitter archival site had its all-time highest view count on March 9. After the film's August streaming release, it broke Amazon Prime Video's all-time high day-one view amount since its launch in Japan. By December 2021, the movie became the highest-grossing movie of the year in Japan, accounting for over ¥10.2 billion (about US$89.5 million). The film has grossed a Japanese box office total of ¥10.28 billion ($93.67 million).
