= 20th Yokohama Film Festival =

1999 film festival in Yokohama, Japan

- Location: Kannai Hall, Yokohama, Kanagawa, Japan
- Founded: 1980
- Festival date: 7 February 1999

The 20th Yokohama Film Festival (第20回ヨコハマ映画祭) was held on 7 February 1999 in Kannai Hall, Yokohama, Kanagawa, Japan.

== Awards ==
- Best Film: Cure
- Best Actor:
  - Claude Maki – Orokamono: Kizu Darake no Tenshi
  - Kiichi Nakai – Love Letter, Begging for Love
- Best Actress: Mieko Harada – Begging for Love
- Best Supporting Actor: Ren Osugi – Cure, Hana-bi, Give It All, Orokamono: Kizu Darake no Tenshi, Inu Hashiru
- Best Supporting Actress: Yumi Yoshiyuki – Murder on D Street, Daikaijū Tōkyō ni arawaru
- Best Director:
  - Kiyoshi Kurosawa – Cure
  - Itsumichi Isomura – Give It All
- Best New Director: Hideaki Anno – Love & Pop
- Best Screenplay: Ryoichi Kimizuka – Bayside Shakedown: The Movie
- Best Cinematography: Yuichi Nagata – Give It All
- Best New Talent:
  - Rena Tanaka – Give It All
  - Kumiko Asō – Dr. Akagi
  - Asumi Miwa – Love & Pop
- Special Jury Prize:
  - Yoichi Maeda – For focusing on entertainment rather than "serious" movies.
  - Bayside Shakedown production team

== Best 10 ==
1. Cure
2. Give It All
3. Hana-bi
4. Orokamono: Kizu Darake no Tenshi
5. Begging for Love
6. Inu Hashiru
7. Love & Pop
8. Ring
9. Bayside Shakedown: The Movie
10. The Bird People in China

runner-up: Love Letter
runner-up: Kiriko no Fūkei
