= Masayuki (animator) =

Japanese animator

- 摩砂雪
- Born: Masayuki Yamaguchi; January 3, 1961 (age 65); Nagano, Japan
- Other names: Emishi Wase (夷 倭世); Masakazu (摩砂一); Sanaba Yoshitomo (沙那芭 美智)
- Education: Tokyo Designer Gakuin College
- Occupations: Animator; director; storyboard artist; screenwriter; cinematographer
- Years active: 1982–present
- Title: Executive advisor of Khara

Masayuki Yamaguchi (山口 正幸, Yamaguchi Masayuki; born January 3, 1961), more commonly known mononymously as Masayuki (摩砂雪), is a Japanese animator and director. He is best known for working on the anime series Neon Genesis Evangelion and co-directing the first three Rebuild of Evangelion films.

== Life and career ==
Masayuki Yamaguchi was born on January 3, 1961, in Nagano Prefecture, Japan. While in high school, he was inspired to enter the animation industry after seeing Hayao Miyazaki's 1978 anime series Future Boy Conan.

In 1982, Masayuki worked on "Key Animation" in several OVA and television anime, including: Acrobunch, Cream Lemon, Fist of the North Star, Cream Lemon Part 4: POP CHASER, Bavi Stock, Gunbuster, Doomed Megalopolis, and Neon Genesis Evangelion. He has also worked under the pseudonym Wase Emishi (夷(えみし) 倭(わ)世(せ), Emishi Wase) on some media, including: Macross Plus, Macross Plus: Movie Edition, and Re: Cutie Honey.

Masayuki is a close friend of the famed Neon Genesis Evangelion creator Hideaki Anno. Together, they have collaborated on many OVAs, films, and television programs, such as Gunbuster, Neon Genesis Evangelion, Neon Genesis Evangelion: Death & Rebirth, The End of Evangelion, GAMERA1999, Cutie Honey, Evangelion: 1.0 You Are (Not) Alone, Evangelion: 2.0 You Can (Not) Advance, Evangelion: 3.0 You Can (Not) Redo, Shin Godzilla, Evangelion: 3.0+1.0 Thrice Upon a Time, and Shin Ultraman. Masayuki's friendship with Anno has become very close, with the former spending half a year editing Anno's wedding video, which apparently had more than 1000 cuts.

== Filmography ==
=== Film ===
- Macross Plus: Movie Edition (1995) – Animation director [as Wase Emishi]
- Neon Genesis Evangelion: Death & Rebirth (1997) – Director [Evangelion:Death segment], animation director, design director, storyboard artist, and key animation [Evangelion:Death segment]
- The End of Evangelion (1997) – Storyboard artist, design director, key animation, and visual water artist
- GAMERA1999 (1999) – Director [with Hideaki Anno]
- Cutie Honey (2004) – Associate director and storyboard artist
- Evangelion: 1.0 You Are (Not) Alone (2007) – Director [with Kazuya Tsurumaki] and key animation
- Evangelion: 2.0 You Can (Not) Advance (2009) – Director [with Kazuya Tsurumaki], storyboard artist, and key animation
- Evangelion: 3.0 You Can (Not) Redo (2012) – Director [with Kazuya Tsurumaki and Mahiro Maeda] and storyboard artist
- Shin Godzilla (2016) – Storyboard artist, D Unit director [with Ikki Todoroki and Hideaki Anno], D Unit cinematographer [with Ikki Todoroki and Hideaki Anno], and D Unit recording [with Ikki Todoroki and Hideaki Anno]
- Evangelion: 3.0+1.0 Thrice Upon a Time (2021) – Draft storyboard artist, key animation, and screen assistant (for animated underwater scenes)
- Shin Ultraman (2022) – Assistant director, storyboard artist [with Akitoshi Yokoyama, Shinji Higuchi, Hideaki Anno, Ikki Todoroki, Kazuyoshi Katayama, and Linto Ueda] and cinematographer

=== Television ===
- Acrobunch (1982) – Key animation
- Fist of the North Star (1984-1987) – Key animation [episode 56]
- Neon Genesis Evangelion (1995-1996) – Assistant director, storyboard artist [8 episodes], key animation [5 episodes], episode director [episodes 19, 24 and 26], and design assistant [episode 19]

=== OVA ===
- Cream Lemon (1984-1987) – Key animation [episode 4]
- Cream Lemon Part 4: POP CHASER (1985) – Key animation
- Bavi Stock (1985-1986) – Key animation [episode 1]
- Gunbuster (1988-1989) – Opening animation and key animation [episodes 5 and 6]
- BAOH (1989) – Character designer and animation director
- Doomed Megalopolis (1991-1992) – Character designer, animation director [episodes 1, 2, and 4], key animation [episodes 3 and 4], storyboard artist [episodes 3 and 4], and screenwriter [episode 4]
- Macross Plus (1994-1995) – Animation director [episode 1; as Wase Emishi]
- Re: Cutie Honey (2004) – Animation director [episode 3; as Wase Emishi]
