= Asumi =

Asumi is a feminine Japanese given name and a surname. Notable people with the name include:

- Asumi Kugo (久後 あすみ, born 1990), Japanese badminton player
- Asumi Miwa (三輪 明日美, born 1982), Japanese actress
- Asumi Nakada (中田 あすみ, born 1988), Japanese voice actress and child model
- Asumi Ōmura (大村 明日美, born 1989), Japanese sprint canoeist
- Kana Asumi (阿澄 佳奈, born 1983), Japanese singer and voice actress
- Rio Asumi (明日海 りお, born 1985), Japanese actress
- Asumi Tsuzaki (born 1989), Japanese former water polo player
