= Kirari (singer) =

Japanese actress, singer, and songwriter (born 1980)

Kirari 希良梨
- Born: 豊元 希良梨 (Toyotomo Kirari); October 23, 1980 (age 45); Okinawa, Japan
- Genres: Anison; J-pop
- Occupations: Actress; dancer; singer-songwriter
- Instrument: Vocals
- Years active: 1997–present
- Labels: Victor Entertainment; Office 303
- Website: http://ameblo.jp/aksgod23/

Japanese name
- Kanji: 希良梨
- Hiragana: きらり
- Katakana: キラリ
Transcriptions
- Romanization: Kirari

Kirari Toyomoto (豊元 希良梨, Toyomoto Kirari; born October 23, 1980) is a Japanese actress, dancer and singer-songwriter.

== Career ==
In 1997 she debuted as an actress in the television drama Gift (ギフト). The next year she played the role of Chisa Noda in the Hideaki Anno film Love & Pop. Kirari wrote "Last Piece" as the end theme for the anime series Great Teacher Onizuka, and she played Nanako in the first live TV version of GTO. Her cover of Martika's Toy Soldiers reached number 18 on the Oricon charts in May 2000.

Shortly afterward she put her career on hold and withdrew from Japanese public life.

== Personal life ==
Fifteen years later she revealed that she had been ill with cervical cancer, and after recovery had moved to Taiwan, married her husband, and had a child.
