= Tom Booker =

American actor

- Born: Tulsa, Oklahoma, U.S.
- Occupations: director, screenwriter, actor
- Years active: 1991–present
- Website: www.theinstitutiontheater.com

Thomas Booker is an American actor, writer, director, and improvisational comedian. He is best known for his role as Keel Lorenz in Neon Genesis Evangelion: Death & Rebirth its sequel The End of Evangelion and the Amazon redub of Rebuild of Evangelion. He was the owner of The Institution Theater in Austin, Texas.

== Early life ==
Booker was born in Tulsa, Oklahoma where he graduated from Nathan Hale High School. As an undergraduate, he was "Top Dawg", University of Oklahoma's mascot. He moved to Chicago and, in 1986, began studying improvisation at The Second City Training Center before studying with legendary improv guru Del Close at ImprovOlympic.

== Career ==
Booker moved to Los Angeles in 1991 and formed Theater-A-Go-Go! with Laura Hall. In 1994 Booker made his television debut as Jinxo in the Babylon 5 episode, "Grail". He also began teaching improv and sketch writing at The Second City Training Center in Los Angeles. His movie debut came in a minor role in the 1995 film Jury Duty. In 2001, he had the voice role of Keel Lorenz in Neon Genesis Evangelion: Death & Rebirth and its sequel The End of Evangelion he later reprised the role in the Amazon redub of Rebuild of Evangelion. He had another minor role in the 1998 mockumentary The Thin Pink Line as a wet underwear contestant. Tom also co-wrote and co-directed (with producing partner Jon Kean) the feature film Kill the Man starring Luke Wilson, which premiered at the 1999 Sundance Film Festival. He also played the role of Biily Bob in the film.

== Filmography ==
Year	Title	Roles	Notes
1994	Babylon 5	Jinxo	Season 1, episode 15 (Grail)
1995	Jury Duty	Press Runner	Minor role
1997	Neon Genesis Evangelion: Death & Rebirth	Keel Lorenz (voice)	English dub
1997	The End of Evangelion	Keel Lorenz (voice)	English dub
1998	The Thin Pink Line	Wet Underwear Contestant	
1999	Kill the Man	Billy Bob	Co-writer and co-director
2001	Curb Your Enthusiasm	Limo Driver	Season 2, episode 10 (The Massage)
2002–2003	Primetime Glick	Various	
2004	Channel 101	France	TV movie
2004	My Big Fat Obnoxious Boss		Consultant – Episode "How Low Can You Go?"
2004	Faking It USA	Himself	Acting Coach – Episode "3 'R's to Protecting Stars"
2006	Gotta Get Off This Merry Go Round: Sex, Dolls and Showtunes	Himself	Video documentary
2009	ExTerminators	Trent Agovino	
2010	Jerry Bruckheimer's Chase	Insurance Manager	Pilot Episode
2011	Hot Dogs & Hand Grenades	Tom Arlene	TV movie
2011	Days of Delusion	Stuart	
2015	29 Light Years	Adam's Boss	
2016	Lazer Team	Doctor	Cameo
2017	Ripped	Caswell	
2021	Evangelion: 1.0 You Are (Not) Alone	Keel Lorenz (voice)	Prime Video English dub
2021	Evangelion: 2.0 You Can (Not) Advance	Keel Lorenz (voice)	Prime Video English dub
2021	Evangelion: 3.0 You Can (Not) Redo	Keel Lorenz (voice)	Prime Video English dub

=== Web ===
Year	Title	Roles	Notes
2010–present	Rooster Teeth Shorts	Various	
2014	iBlade	Archie	Part 2
2015–present	On the Spot	Himself	Recurring Guest
