= Evangelion: 3.0 You Can (Not) Redo =

2012 anime film

- Theatrical release poster

Japanese name
- Kanji: ヱヴァンゲリヲン新劇場版：Q
- Literal meaning: Evangelion New Theatrical Edition: Q
Transcriptions
- Revised Hepburn: Evangerion Shin Gekijō-ban: Kyū
- Directed by: Hideaki Anno; Mahiro Maeda; Kazuya Tsurumaki; Masayuki
- Screenplay by: Hideaki Anno
- Based on: Neon Genesis Evangelion by Hideaki Anno
- Starring: Megumi Ogata; Megumi Hayashibara; Yuko Miyamura; Maaya Sakamoto; Akira Ishida; Kotono Mitsuishi
- Cinematography: Toru Fukushi
- Edited by: Yeong Mi-Lee
- Music by: Shiro Sagisu
- Production company: Studio Khara
- Distributed by: T-Joy; Khara, Inc.
- Release date: November 17, 2012
- Running time: 96 minutes
- Country: Japan
- Language: Japanese
- Box office: $67 million

Evangelion: 3.0 You Can (Not) Redo (ヱヴァンゲリヲン新劇場版：Q, Evangerion Shin Gekijō-ban: Kyū; "Evangelion New Theatrical Edition: Q") is a 2012 Japanese animated science fiction action film written and chief directed by Hideaki Anno and the third of four films released in the Rebuild of Evangelion series, based on the original anime series Neon Genesis Evangelion.

It was produced by Anno's Studio Khara and released in Japanese theaters on November 17, 2012. It was followed by Evangelion: 3.0+1.0 Thrice Upon a Time in 2021. The film was re-released twice with improved visuals, with the new versions replacing the 3.0 in the original title by 3.33 and 3.333' respectively.

== Plot ==
Fourteen years after the worldwide cataclysm called the Third Impact, (Note: As depicted in the 2009 film Evangelion: 2.0 You Can (Not) Advance.) Asuka Langley Shikinami and Mari Illustrious Makinami, pilots of the Evangelion mecha, retrieve a container from Earth's orbit carrying Evangelion Unit 01 and its pilot Shinji Ikari. When Asuka grabs the container with her Evangelion unit, it releases attack drones. Unit 01 awakens and destroys the drones, then deactivates and descends back to Earth. Kaworu Nagisa watches and says he has been waiting for Shinji.

Salvaged from Unit 01, Shinji is fitted with an explosive choker and sent to Captain Misato Katsuragi, who now leads WILLE, an organization intent on destroying her previous employer NERV, the paramilitary organization that deploys the Evangelion units. As more drones attack, Misato launches the flying battleship Wunder, powered by Unit 01, to destroy them. She warns that Shinji will be killed if he pilots any Evangelion units because of the Third Impact, which has also kept the pilots from aging. The other occupant of Unit 01, Rei Ayanami, was never found.

An Evangelion unit, Mark.09, intercepts the Wunder. Hearing Rei's voice, Shinji escapes with the unit. Rei takes him to the ruined NERV headquarters. Gendo Ikari, Shinji's father and NERV's leader, informs him that he is to pilot a new Evangelion, Unit 13, with Kaworu. Shinji befriends Kaworu as they practice piano duets together, but discovers that Rei is unable to remember anything and only follows orders. Kaworu shows Shinji the ruins of Tokyo 3, explaining that Shinji's awakening of Unit 01 caused the Third Impact. He also reveals that Gendo plans to force humanity's evolution by triggering a mass extinction, removing humanity's individuality and reuniting with his deceased wife Yui Ayanami.

Gendo's assistant Kozo Fuyutsuki invites Shinji to play shogi and reveals that Yui is within Unit 01 as the control system. Rei is one of several clones of Shinji's mother; the Rei who rescued him is only the latest. Shinji is distraught by this. Kaworu removes Shinji's choker and wears it to gain his trust.

Shinji and Kaworu pilot Unit 13 on their mission to use the Spears of Cassius and Longinus, two ancient weapons, to undo the Third Impact; Rei follows in Mark.09. When Unit 13 reaches the body of the alien lifeform Lilith, Kaworu realizes that the spears are not what he expected. Kaworu, Asuka and Mari try stopping Shinji, but Shinji removes the spears. On Gendo's orders, Mark.09 decapitates Mark.06 to release the Twelfth Angel, which is absorbed by Unit 13.

The awakened Unit 13 rises into the sky, starting another cataclysm, the Fourth Impact. Kaworu reveals that as the First Angel, he is now "cast down" to the Thirteenth. Rei loses control of Mark.09, which boards Wunder on its own in an attempt to take control of the ship. Rei ejects from her unit and Asuka blows up her own unit to destroy Mark.09. To stop the Fourth Impact, Mari ejects Shinji's cockpit from Unit 13, while Kaworu stabs the unit with the spears and allows the choker to kill him, to Shinji's horror. Rescuing Shinji from the cockpit, Asuka lectures him on running away from his problems before dragging him through the remains of Tokyo-3, with Rei following.

== Voice cast ==
Character	Japanese	English	
Character	Japanese	Funimation/Okratron 5000 (2016)	Dubbing Brothers/Prime Video (2021)
Shinji Ikari	Megumi Ogata	Spike Spencer	Spike Spencer
Misato Katsuragi	Kotono Mitsuishi	Allison Keith	Allison Keith
Gendo Ikari	Fumihiko Tachiki	John Swasey	John Swasey
Asuka Langley Shikinami	Yūko Miyamura	Tiffany Grant	Tiffany Grant
Sakura Suzuhara^{[*]}	Miyuki Sawashiro	Felecia Angelle	Felecia Angelle
Kaworu Nagisa	Akira Ishida	Jerry Jewell	Daman Mills
Rei Ayanami (temporary name)	Megumi Hayashibara	Brina Palencia	Amanda Winn-Lee
Ritsuko Akagi	Yuriko Yamaguchi	Colleen Clinkenbeard	Mary Faber
Mari Illustrious Makinami	Maaya Sakamoto	Trina Nishimura	Deneen Melody
Kozo Fuyutsuki	Motomu Kiyokawa	Kent Williams	Michael Ross
Midori Kitakami^{[*]}	Mariya Ise	Tia Ballard	Bijou Vann
Shigeru Aoba	Takehito Koyasu	Phil Parsons	Jaxon Lee
Makoto Hyuga	Hiro Yuuki	Mike McFarland	Joe Fria
Maya Ibuki	Miki Nagasawa	Caitlin Glass	Amy Seeley
Keel Lorenz	Mugihito	Bill Jenkins	Tom Booker
Koji Takao^{[*]}	Akio Otsuka	Greg Dulcie	Jake Eberle
Hideki Tama^{[*]}	Anri Katsu	Aaron Roberts	Scott Golden
Sumire Nagara^{[*]}	Sayaka Ohara	Krishna Smitha	Rebeka Thomas

New character

== Marketing ==
The film's initial teaser trailer, shown after the end credits of Evangelion: 2.0 You Can (Not) Advance in the style of the "next episode" previews in the original TV series, described Shinji and Rei still remaining frozen within Unit-01, Tokyo-3 and the Geofront being abandoned, "NERV personnel [being] held in confinement," "Eva Mark-06 descend[ing] on Dogma," "the quickening Eva Unit-08 and its pilot," and the assembling of "the children chosen by fate." Scenes shown included the impaled Unit-01, Kaworu meeting with four shadowy figures, Gendo and Fuyutsuki in mountain climbing gear, Kaji yelling while pointing a pistol at an unknown person, a private conference between Mari and another unknown person, Mari confronting four Rei clones, and a restored Asuka wearing an eyepatch, despite none of these scenes appearing in the final film.

On August 26, 2011, a 15-second teaser trailer was shown after the Evangelion 2.0 You Can (Not) Advance television broadcast, featuring footage of Asuka piloting Unit-02 in space and a tentative release date in the fall of 2012. On January 1, 2012, the official website was updated to reveal the official English title, You Can (Not) Redo, and a tentative release date for the fourth and final film in 2013. The "EVA-EXTRA 08" live screening in Shinjuku revealed that the film would be released in Japan on November 17, 2012.

A 30-second trailer streamed on Nico Nico Douga on October 17, 2012, showing Shinji, Rei, Kaworu, Mari, and Asuka. A full trailer, the fifth promotional video for the film, was released on November 1, 2012, containing both footage from the August 26 Nico Nico Douga trailer as well as previously unseen footage. It also featured a new song by music composer Shirō Sagisu, titled "The Wrath of God, in All Its Fury". On November 14, a one-minute 48-second trailer was released privately on Hikaru Utada's YouTube channel. It features Hikaru Utada's new song, "Sakura Nagashi". On November 16, 2012, the first six minutes and thirty-eight seconds of the film were aired on Nippon Television to promote the film's release at midnight on November 17. An additional 17-second trailer was released on November 18, showing EVA Units 02 and 13, the airship Wunder, and the main cast of Evangelion thus far.

A new three-minute trailer was released on April 17 as the promotional video for the 3.0 video release, renamed Evangelion: 3.33 You Can (Not) Redo.

== Release ==
The film was released on November 17, 2012 in Japanese theatres by Toei Company. The film was also released in Korean theaters in April 2013. The Japanese Blu-ray and DVD were released on April 24, 2013.

The film was licensed by Funimation (North America), Madman Entertainment (Australia) and Manga Entertainment (United Kingdom) for home release on Blu-ray and DVD. The US announcement was revealed once their Facebook page reached over 1 million likes and was later provided with a release date for February 2014. However, due to more demand on theatrical screenings the home release was delayed. After numerous months with lack of information regarding both the theatrical release and home release, a FUNimation post on Facebook assured fans that they were working closely with Studio Khara to ensure the English dub is closer to Khara's vision. As a result, both the Australian and United Kingdom releases (both originally given a March 2014 release date) were postponed until the situation was sorted. In December 2014, Funimation confirmed that they intended to release Evangelion 3.33 in the near future and that Khara was creating the English-language subtitle track for the Western release of the film.

In July 2013, 3.0 was shown for the first time with official English subtitles at AVCon. Before the delay, Madman organized screenings of 3.0 as part of its Reel Anime film festival in select cinemas across Australia from September to October 2013. In the US, the film was screened as part of the Jpop Summit Festival 2013 in San Francisco on July 27, July 29 and August 4, 2013. It was also screened at Otakon 2013 in Baltimore, Maryland and at Anime Weekend Atlanta on September 28. The premiere of the English dub was screened at New York Comic Con on October 11, 2013, which was previously announced as a subbed screening.

=== Home media ===
After an announcement by Funimation at the New York Comic Con on October 10, 2015, the DVD/Blu-ray of 3.33 was released in North America on February 2, 2016. The film grossed $4.6 million in Blu-ray and DVD sales in the United States.

In 2021, Amazon Studios acquired the streaming rights to all of the Rebuild of Evangelion films. The 3.33 version of the film became available on the streaming service on August 13, 2021. It featured full re-dubbings of all Rebuild films, including several voice actors from the A.D. Vision and Manga Entertainment localizations of the original series and films, in place of the mostly new cast used in the Funimation adaptations of the Rebuild series and Netflix's adaptation of the series. Like Netflix's release, it also included a full re-translation by Khara's in-house translator, Dan Kanemitsu.

=== Re-release ===
On December 23, 2020, the film was announced for a limited run in Japanese theaters beginning January 8, 2021 under the title Evangelion: 3.333 You Can (Not) Redo. This version of the film was remastered in 4K and contains a variety of updated visuals meant to better align it with its sequel Evangelion: 3.0+1.0 Thrice Upon a Time. On June 12, 2021, the sequel received a re-release called 3.0+1.01, that included a prequel manga to the events of 3.0 called Evangelion 3.0 (-120 min.), written by co-director Kazuya Tsurumaki at Hideaki Anno's initiative. For its dual standard and UHD Blu-ray release on August 25, 2021, 3.333 received a making-of documentary supervised by Anno, entitled Evangelion:3.333 Breakdown. On the home media release of 3.0+1.0, another prequel, an original video animation called Evangelion: 3.0 (-46h) was released, dealing with other events preceding the manga itself, while the manga was also re-released in video format in full color and voiced by the original cast. The updated version for home media was titled Evangelion: 3.0+1.11 Thrice Upon a Time.

== Music ==
The theme song for the film, "Sakura Nagashi" (桜流し; lit. 'Flowing Cherry Blossoms'), was provided by Japanese-American singer-songwriter Hikaru Utada, who also wrote the themes for the previous two films. Utada, though at the time on hiatus, agreed to a standalone release. The song was created with help from English songwriter Paul Carter. A soundtrack album with the film's score by Shirō Sagisu titled Shiro SAGISU Music from "EVANGELION: 3.0" You Can Not Redo which contains the "full" music track from the film as well as several bonus tracks not included in the film was released on November 28, 2012. Another soundtrack disc containing the expanded score Evangelion: 3.0 You Can (Not) Redo Original Soundtrack was bundled in the home video version, released on April 24, 2013.

== Reception ==
=== Box office ===
The film was released in Japan on November 17, 2012. It earned Japan's second-highest weekend box office of 2012 with ¥1,131,004,600 ($13,913,200). The film subsequently grossed ¥5,267,373,350 ($66,015,081) in Japan by the end of 2012. A 2020 Japan re-release grossed $433,850, totaling $66,448,931 grossed in Japan.

Overseas, the film grossed ₩441,165,211 ($402,945) in South Korea, $208,699 in Hong Kong and Thailand, $174,945 in the United States and Canada, and $47,103 in Australia and New Zealand, for an overseas total of $833,692. This brings the film's worldwide box office gross to $67,282,623.

=== Critical response ===
American critical reception of Evangelion: 3.0 You Can (Not) Redo was considerably more negative than for the two previous installments. On Metacritic, the movie has an average score of 45 based on 4 reviews, indicating "mixed or average reviews".

David Chute of Variety calls it "a film that too often substitutes obfuscation for complexity". He goes on to say that Shinji's continuing struggle to come to terms with the world he has awoken into is "a dreary drag on the narrative", while lauding the film's visuals as its strongest asset.

In a short review for the Los Angeles Times, Inkoo Kang largely echoes these sentiments, also praising the visual style by declaring the first six minutes of the film to possibly be "the most beautiful depiction of war ever rendered on film". The story, on the other hand, is described as largely incoherent and "freeze-dried melodrama".

An analysis written by Ard Vijn for Screen Anarchy presents an assessment from the perspective of a fan of the original series, or an "EVA veteran". Notably, his review is largely in agreement with the other voices, though focusing more on a severe discontent with the perceivedly dissatisfactory evolution of the original characters—"People you knew have now changed, say three sentences, and leave"—with new characters being described as "cyphers at best". In continuation, he expresses his frustration with the lack of stakes, as he perceives the film's conclusion, another cataclysmic event, as emotionally ineffective since almost all of humanity and the world appear to have already been destroyed.

Conversely, Charles Solomon of IndieWire praised the film for being "as shocking and energizing as the slap a Zen master would administer to a student" and lauded the visuals from climactic Fourth Impact sequence as "extraordinary", while still acknowledging how it is "not easy to watch" and will confuse newcomers who have never watched the previous two films and the TV series.

In a mixed-to-positive review for the home video release, Zac Bertschy of Anime News Network criticized the film for being "poorly constructed", while also praising it for being "challenging and emotionally intense as the best stuff Evangelion has to offer" and deserves to be "experienced, criticized, admired, ripped apart and argued over like every other thought-provoking piece of artistic expression".

=== Awards and nominations ===
Year	Award	Category	Result
2013	17th Japan Media Arts Festival – Excellence Prize	Animation Awards	Won
2013	36th Japan Academy Award	Excellent Animation of the Year	Won
2013	36th Japan Academy Award	Best Animation of the Year	Nominated
2013	46th Sitges Catalan International Film Festival – Anima't Award	Best Animated Feature Film	Nominated

== Sequel ==
The fourth film in the Rebuild of Evangelion series, Evangelion: 3.0+1.0 Thrice Upon a Time, was previewed in a post-credits trailer. It shows EVA Unit 8+2, an apparent fusion of Unit-02 and Unit-08, seemingly fighting dark green copies of Mark.06. Misato's narration of the trailer suggests Shinji who "still lack[s] the will to live" finding a "place that teaches him hope", the implementation of the Human Instrumentality Project, and a final stand by WILLE and the Wunder (with the customary promise of fan service, "up to the end"). It was scheduled to be released on June 27, 2020 but was rescheduled to January 23, 2021 and again to March 8, 2021 due to the COVID-19 pandemic.
