= Daicon Film's Return of Ultraman =

1983 film by Hideaki Anno

- DVD cover
- Directed by: Hideaki Anno
- Written by: Toshio Okada
- Based on: Return of Ultraman by Tsuburaya Productions
- Produced by: Yasuhiro Takeda; Takeshi Sawamura
- Starring: Hideaki Anno; Norio Tamura; Yasuhiro Takeda
- Cinematography: Takami Akai
- Edited by: Takami Akai
- Production company: Daicon Film
- Distributed by: Tsuburaya Productions
- Release date: July 1, 2022 (Shinjuku Wald 9)
- Running time: 28 minutes
- Country: Japan
- Language: Japanese

Daicon Film's Return of Ultraman (DAICONFILM版 帰ってきたウルトラマン, DAICON FILM-ban Kaettekita Ultraman; lit. 'Daicon Film's version of Return of Ultraman') (Note: Also known as Return of Ultraman: MAT Arrow 1 Takeoff Order (帰ってきたウルトラマン マットアロー1号発進命令, Kaettekita Urutoraman Matto Arō 1-gō Hasshin Meirei).) is a 1983 Japanese superhero kaiju parody fan film directed by Hideaki Anno. The film is a sequel to two previous Ultraman fan films produced by Anno; in the latter of those two, Ultraman leaves Earth, and this film's title refers to Ultraman's return after the events of the previous film.

== Plot ==
One day, a meteorite called "Lambda-1" suddenly landed on the streets of Hiratsune City, instantly reducing the entire central area to rubble. At the base of the MAT (Monster Attack Team), a monster elimination team affiliated with the Earth Defense Organization, Captain Ibuki receives a report of the damage and explains to the members gathered in the command center.

That night, MAT created a computer simulation based on various collected data, recreating the meteorite's impact and the damage to Hiratsune City. The meteorite was determined to be 60 meters in diameter and 130 kg in mass. And soon after, three life forms emerged from the meteorite and began to move.

Captain Ibuki speculates that the meteorite is a capsule used to send a monster to Earth, and concludes that the series of destructive acts is leading to an alien invasion.

He ordered his team members to launch the Mat Gyro and Mat Arrow 1. As the team members are sent out, Captain Ibuki receives a message from the Earth Defense Force General Staff Headquarters through Nishi (the command room operator) stating that "everyone near the meteorite's impact point has been wiped out, with no survivors.

They explain that if the MAT base reaches "Level 4," it means that the use of thermonuclear weapons against both the meteorite and the monsters is unavoidable." Meanwhile, the three lifeforms hiding underground begin to wreak havoc in the urban areas of Hiratsune City.

Three Mat Gyro units arrive on the scene and begin their attack on the monsters. The Matt Gyro Force fought back bravely and temporarily succeeded in repelling the three life forms, but immediately afterwards, the three life forms combined to form the giant monster "Bug Jewel" (キルアン "Kiruan")

Upon receiving this report, Captain Ibuki orders the launch of Matt Arrow 1, which is equipped with a laser cannon unit to reinforce the Matt Gyro, and also orders the Matt Gyro Unit to attack with napalm bombs until Matt Arrow 1 arrives. Officer Hayakawa, who received orders from Captain Ibuki, still hesitates to attack the city where there are over 5,000 survivors. Still, the order to attack with napalm bombs is not rescinded, so the city of Hiratsune is turned into a sea of flames by the napalm bombs and rocket attacks.

The Matt Arrow 1 arrives and fires its laser cannon at the monster, but a barrier created by the monster blocks the beam. Officer Ibuki, aboard the Matt Arrow 1, attempts to escape the scene by detaching and jettisoning the laser cannon's battery pack unit, which has run out of energy, but his Matt Arrow 1 is shot down by the monster's attack.

Over 20 hours have passed since the meteorite fell, but still no effective means of attacking the monster has been found. After returning to the base, the troops were forced to wait for orders from the Earth Defense Force General Staff Headquarters.

At that moment, an order is received from the Earth Defense Force General Staff Headquarters: "At 8:00 a.m. today, attack the monster with thermonuclear weapons." After receiving orders, Captain Ibuki calmly transitions the MAT base to "Level 4" and orders the Mat Arrow 1 to be equipped with thermonuclear weapons, declaring that "I will personally carry out the attack." However, Officer Hayakawa tried to release the Level 4, saying, "There may still be over 5,000 survivors at the location where the monster is. What's more, Officer Ibuki, who was shot down, may also be alive. We can't just leave them to die!"

He pushed aside the other officers and desperately persisted with his captain. However, the captain scolds him, saying, "Avenge your comrades. Are you still an Earthling?" and he is placed under arrest and confined to his room. Officer Hayakawa then holds his transformation device, "the Ultra Eye", in his hand and stares at it, muttering with a regretful look on his face, "I'm an Earthling. And I'm Ultraman. Damn it!"

Then, just as the MAT Arrow 1, piloted by Captain Ibuki himself, took off from the MAT base, Officer Hayakawa put on the Ultra Eye and transformed into Ultraman, becoming gigantic, and destroying part of the MAT base.

Ultraman flew to the scene to catch Matt Arrow No. 1, forcibly removed the thermonuclear unit, and showed its location to Captain Ibuki. There, Officer Ibuki was found collapsed. Captain Ibuki rushed to his side and, although seriously injured, he regained consciousness. The battle between Ultraman and Bug Jewel was extremely fierce, with all of Ultraman's techniques being repelled by Bug Jewel's powerful barrier. As his Color Timer flashed, he counterattacked with an Ultra Gaze at close range, and using the Ultra Bracelet he had recovered, destroyed the Bug Jewel's barrier. With the barrier destroyed, Ultraman finishes the monster off with a Specium beam. Ultraman, holding the thermonuclear unit which was about to explode, flies into the sky and turns into light. As the MAT members who arrived to rescue them in the Mat Gyro rejoiced at the survival of Ibuki and his son, Officer Hayakawa appeared out of nowhere, and Captain Ibuki reflects on his mistake and shakes hands with Hayakawa Ken.

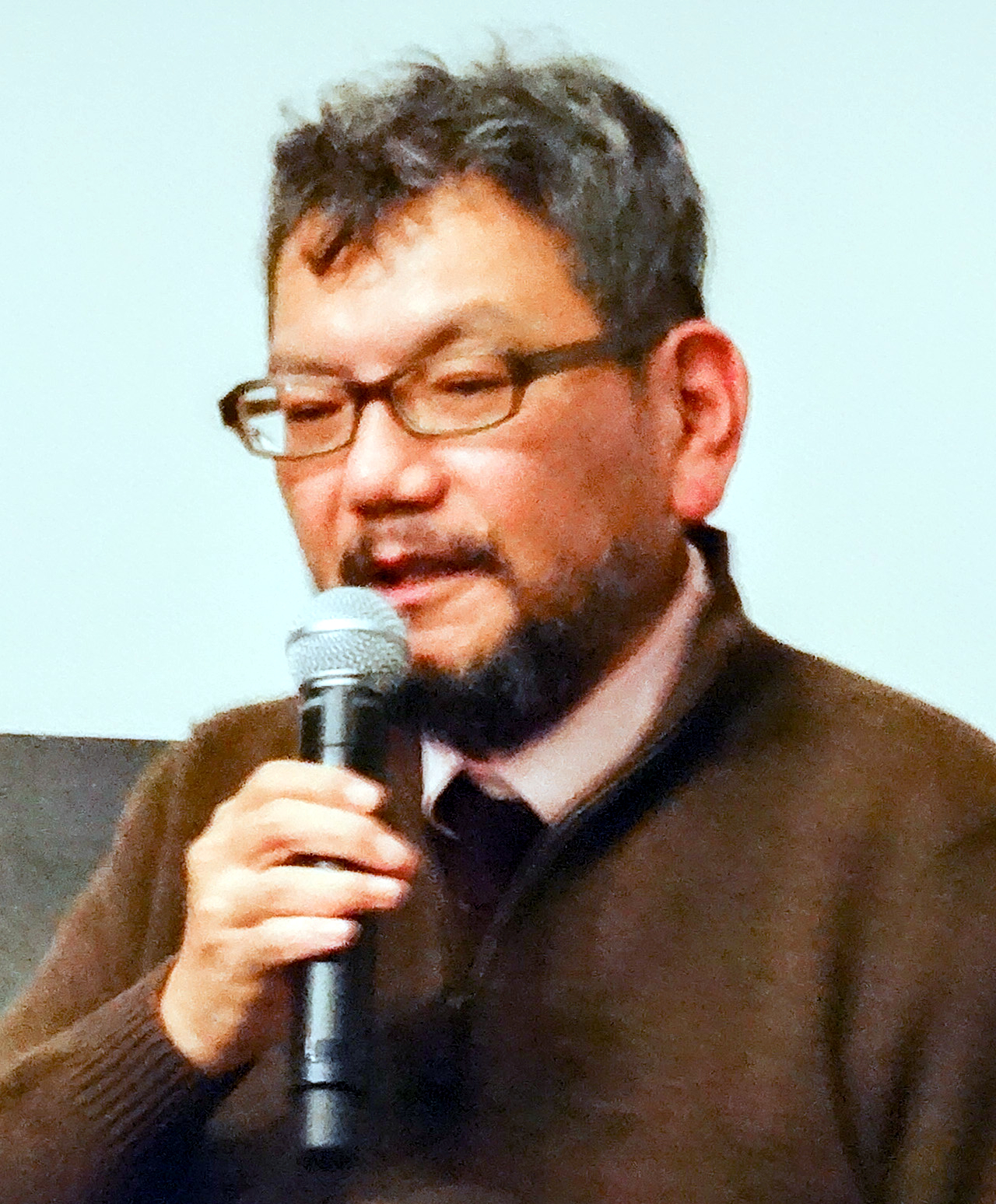
Hideaki Anno

== Cast ==
- Hideaki Anno as Ultraman (here, the character is referencing Ultraman Jack)
- Yasuhiro Takeda as Captain Ibuki
- Shiyuichi Hayashi as Hayakawa (MAT member)
- Takeshi Sawamura as Ibuki (MAT member)
- Takashi Gyôten as Yamaga (MAT member)
- Toshihiko Nishigaki as Imamura (MAT member)
- Yuki Nishi as Nishi (MAT member)
- Norio Tamura as Kiruan (Monster)
- Norifumi Kiyozumi as the narrator (voice)

== Characters ==
=== Ultraman ===
==== Return of Ultraman ====
He is essentially a parody of Ultraman Jack, the lead hero from Tsuburaya Productions' Return of Ultraman. His transformation scene into Ultraman is a combination of Ultra Seven's transformation pattern (transforming by wearing the Ultra Eye) and Ultraman Jack's transformation pattern (footage of their giant transformation rise scene). During the transformation, he destroys the MAT base building in the process of becoming giant and emerges.

After transforming, Hideaki Anno's face (who plays Ultraman) is still visible. He wears Anno's personal black-rimmed glasses, a windbreaker jacket with Ultraman Jack's body pattern spray-painted on it, jeans, sneakers, and work gloves. His transformation call is borrowed from the original Ultraman (Masao Nakasone).

- The color timer is a modified toothpick container lid, and the Ultra Bracelet is Anno's personal wristwatch.
- The original name of the parody character was "Ultraman Jack," but since there was no proper noun at the time, he is simply referred to as "Ultraman" in this work.

=== Earth Defense Agency Monster Attack Team MAT ===
- With the exception of Officers Hayakawa and Ibuki, the names of the captain and team members are written only by their surnames in the film, without any kanji. In the end credits, only Captain Ibuki and Officer Hayakawa are listed with their character names and performers' names (the other team members' character names are collectively referred to as "MAT members").

==== Captain Ibuki ====
The captain of MAT. His name is Gengorou. He is calm and collected.

Upon receiving an order from the Earth Defense Force General Staff to attack the monsters with thermonuclear weapons, he transitions the base to "Level 4" readiness and personally pilots the Mat Arrow 1, equipped with thermonuclear weapons, before setting off. He attempts to attack the Bug Jewel monster with his thermonuclear weapon, prepared to sacrifice the survivors of Hiratsune City, but Ultraman arrives and thwarts the thermonuclear attack. His Matt Arrow 1 (a different aircraft from his own) is shot down by the monster, and he rescues his son (Officer Ibuki), who miraculously survived at the monster's scene.

After the monster is defeated by Ultraman and the Matt Arrow 1's thermonuclear weapon unit is transported far beyond the atmosphere by Ultraman and explodes, he expresses regret for attempting to use the thermonuclear weapon and thanks Ultraman in front of the team members who have rushed to Hiratsune City.

- His name is a reference to Ryu Ibuki, the second captain of the MAT (Magazine of the Titans), who appeared in episode 22 of Tsuburaya Productions' "Return of Ultraman."

==== Ken Hayakawa (Ken Hayakawa) ====
A member of the MAT. Age 21. He pilots Mat Gyro Unit 3.

He uses the Ultra Eye (Anno's personal black-rimmed glasses) to transform into the aforementioned Ultraman (played by Anno). As Ultraman, he knows the true identity of the monster Bug Jewel.

- His character name is the same as the protagonist of the special effects TV drama "Kaiketsu Zubat," produced by Toei and Tokyo 12 Channel, as well as the protagonist of the "Kaiketsu no Tenki" series, a parody of the same work and independently produced by DAICON FILM, just like this work.

==== Officer Ibuki ====
A member of the MAT team. Captain Ibuki's son. His name is Shingo.

He deploys in Mat Arrow Unit 1 and attacks the monster Bug Jewel with a laser cannon unit, but the monster generates a barrier, making it ineffective, and he is shot down by the monster's attack. However, he miraculously survives and is rescued by his father from the scene of the monster's appearance.

==== Officer Yamaga ====
A member of the MAT team. Pilots Mat Gyro No. 1.

Before combining, the Bug Jewel monster's tentacles nearly capture the Mat Gyro he is piloting, putting him in a pinch, but thanks to covering fire from Officer Hayakawa and his fellow Officers' Mat Gyros, he barely escapes the crisis.

- The character's name [Hiroyuki Yamaga] is not directly related to Yamaga Hiroyuki. Also, because the actor has a young face, there was an anecdote at the time that he might be a young officer, until the scene at the beginning of the second part where he is seen smoking a cigarette inside the MAT base.

==== Officer Imamura ====
MAT officer. Pilots Mat Gyro No. 2.

He is the only male officer with a mustache.

==== Officer Nishi ====
MAT female officer. Her name is Yuki. She is the operator in the base's command room.

In the final scene, he and the other members of the team board the Mat Gyro and head to Hiratsune City to welcome Captain Ibuki and his son, and Team Member Hayakawa (Ultraman).

=== Monster ===
==== Multiplying Monster Bug Jewel ====
The strongest monster in the universe that Ultraman fought. Ultraman calls it "Kiluan."

Its true identity is an interstellar biological weapon that hid inside a meteorite called "Lambda 1" (a capsule disguised as a capsule used to send monsters from outer space to Earth) and attacked Hiratsune City on Earth. The meteorite's fall caused devastating damage to the city center of Hiratsune. It separated into three bodies and hid underground, gradually growing before combining into one giant monster.

She torments both MAT and Ultraman with light bullets she spits from her mouth and a barrier that deflects all attacks, but after receiving Ultraman's suicidal Ultra Gaze in her mouth, her overloaded barrier is destroyed by the Ultra Bracelet. Ultraman counterattacks, starting with a Meteor Kick, and then a spinning kick knocks her over, sending her flying. She is then hit by a Specium Ray, causing a massive explosion.

- Her name comes from "bug" (insect) and "jewel" (jewel). She was originally intended to resemble the Legion from "Gamera 2: Legion Attacks," but the design and concept were changed due to the difficulty of adapting it into a film.

=== Other ===
==== Elementary School Girl ====
A girl living in Hiratsune City appears in the opening credits (introduction) following the film's main titles. When the meteorite "Lambda 1" fell, he was on his way to elementary school in Hiratsune City, and it appears that he was killed by the falling meteorite along with many other Hiratsune citizens.

== Staff ==
- Hideaki Anno (Director)
- Toshio Okada (Writer)
- Takami Akai (Editor and Camera man)
- Takeshi Sawamura (Producer)
- Yasuhiro Takeda (Producer)
- Makoto Konishi (Sound Effect Artist)
- Naoki Haraguchi (Art)
- Shiyuichi Hayashi (Art)
- Akira Ibusuki (Art)
- Yasutaka Iwamoto (Art)
- Keiichi Kojima (Art)
- Satoru Kuwahara (Art)
- Kenji Nagato (Art)
- Kiyohide Taguchi (Art)
- Jun Tamaya (Art)
- Shôhei Toyama (Art)
- Hiroaki Utahara (Art)
- Tatsuya Yamamoto (Art)
- Toshihiro Yamashita (Art)
- Takami Akai (Special Effects Artist)
- Tarô Fukuda (Special Effects Artist)
- Jun Kita (Special Effects Artist)
- Kenichiro Mera (Special Effects Artist)
- Tôru Saegusa (Special Effects Artist)
- Naoki Shibahara (Special Effects Artist)
- Sueo Sugimoto (Special Effects Artist)
- Norio Tamura (Special Effects Artist)
- Kôji Tatsumi (Special Effects Artist)
- Takashi Atsumi (Computer Graphics Artist)
- Masami Uchida (Computer Graphics Artist)

== Production ==
=== Set and Miniature ===
==== Command room ====
The command room was built inside a reserve factory floor. All the part of the room was handmade from the floor to the ceiling, Using cardboard box and other material to build the frame of the room and painting over it. The computer screen is created by using transulunce paper with light behind them to create a glow effects.

"It was built in the summer with only one fan cooling the room. It was made without any break, day and night. It took a week to be made but was dismantled in only 2 hours"

After the room is complete it was also use by the cast for rehearsal.

==== Miniature ====
Miniatures were created using painted cardboard and small city props painted by hand. They were used in scenes like city scape where the monster and Ultraman fight, the outside shot of MAT base, and fighter planes' launching scene.

==== Ship cockpit ====
The ship cockpit is actually almost completely out of paper. The staff have to carry it very carefully to not break it while transporting or filming.

The wind effect on the outside of the cockpit was created by two staff members smoking cigarette and blowing the smoke into the back of a small fan that push the smoke into the scene.

=== Costume ===
The MAT uniform for Anno's version of ''The Return of Ultraman'' was designed by Anno.

As you can see, the design is like the ''Earth Federation Forces'' uniforms of the ''Ultra Guard'' and ''Mobile Suit Gundam'' divided into two by adding them together

It could be said that the design clearly shows what everyone, including Mr. Anno, loved at the time.[11]

Nowadays, there are many shops that are convenient for cosplay, such as costpas and yuzawaya. It was not there at all at that time. So what about the actual costume. I decided to have a regular clothing store sew it for me based on the design drawings that Mr. Anno had drawn soberly.[10]

This clothing store was introduced to the role of Imamura (the biggest member). That was the relationship between his family business. So, the representative, a member of Imamura, and the female representative, a member of Nishi, went there for basting.[12]

=== Filming ===
The monster scene is film at Yonago in Tottori prefecture, the foot of Mt. Daisen. The fist monster scene with fighter jets is film at night while the fight with Ultraman is film during the day time.

=== Special Effects ===
Explosion and smoke effect is film using practical effect on set by using smoke grenades and pyrotechnics.

The fighter jet digital screen, the monster's shield, and Ultraman beam attacks are done using computer generated effect done after filming.

== Release ==
The film was released on August 20, 1983, as a part of the Nihon SF Taikai convention called DAICON IV, in Osaka, Japan, held on August 20–21, 1983. Hideaki Anno attended a screening of the film in Tokyo, where he met his future friend and collaborator Shinji Higuchi for the first time. They would later collaborate on Shin Ultraman with Anno returning to the title role.

It was later scheduled for release on DVD on August 5, 2001, and sales ended on June 30, 2004, as it was a limited-time product.

After the success of Shin Ultraman, the film was shown at Shinjuku Wald 9 CINEMA on July 1, 2022. To celebrate Shin Ultraman's success and for the theater's 15th anniversary. And in the same year, an HD remastered version is available for streaming on Amazon Prime Video in Japan around November 18, 2022.

It was also uploaded on YouTube on May 9, 2012 (DAICON FILM - 帰ってきたウルトラマン マットアロー1号発進命令)

== Reception ==
The film was sold as a DVD on August 5, 2001, at 6,800 yen, in a limited-time sale until June 30, 2004.

To celebrate the release of Shin Godzilla, there was the release of a Blu-Ray box which included all of Hideo Anno's live action movies from 1998 to 2004, including this film as one of those movies.
