= Asumi Miwa =

Japanese actress

- Born: March 12, 1982 (age 44)
- Occupation: Actress
- Years active: 1996–present
- Height: 1.61 m (5 ft 3 1/2 in)
- Children: 3

Asumi Miwa (三輪 明日美, Miwa Asumi; born 12 March 1982) is a Japanese actress from Yokohama, Japan. She is the younger sister of actress Hitomi Miwa.

== Biography ==
Asumi Miwa was born as the second of three daughters in Yokohama, Kanagawa. She became interested in acting while in junior high school, when her older sister Hitomi started working as an extra on TV shows. She began taking acting lessons at an acting school and in 1996 starred in a commercial for the Urban Renaissance Agency. She made her acting debut in 1998 in the leading role of Hideaki Anno's Love & Pop. The movie's theme song "Ano Subarashii Ai wo Mou Ichido" was sung by Miwa and released as a single on December 22, 1997. For her performance in Love & Pop, she won the Best New Talent award at the 20th Yokohama Film Festival in 1999.

She has also worked as a motion capture actress. She provided the motion capture for the character Rebecca Chambers in the ending movie of the 2002 video game Resident Evil Zero. In the 2004 animated film Appleseed, she performed the motion capture for the character Deunan.

== Personal life ==
Miwa married a 42-year-old videographer and restaurant owner on May 5, 2003. She gave birth to their first child in November 2003. Their second daughter was born in November 2007 and their first son was born in November 2008.

Miwa's older sister is the actress Hitomi Miwa (三輪ひとみ). The two have appeared together in several movies. Her younger sister is former actress Megumi Miwa (三輪恵未), who was active as an actress for a short time in the early 2000s.

== Selected filmography ==
- Love & Pop (1998) - Hiromi Yoshii
- Ju-On: The Curse (2000) - Kanna Murakami
- Uzumaki (2000) - Shiho Ishikawa
- Boogiepop and Others (2000) - Naoko Kamikishiro
- Love Ghost (2001) - Suzue Tanaka
- Shadow of the Wraith (2001) - Nahoko Nakada
- Ping Pong (2002) - Muuko
- Sayonara, Kuro (2003) - Machiko Yokokawa
- Appleseed (2004) - Deunan (motion capture)
- The Great Yokai War (2005) - Rokurokubi
