= Love & Pop =

- Theatrical release poster
- Directed by: Hideaki Anno
- Screenplay by: Hideaki Anno; Akio Satsukawa
- Based on: Topaz II by Ryū Murakami
- Produced by: Toshimichi Otsuki
- Starring: Asumi Miwa; Kirari; Hirono Kudō; Yukie Nakama
- Cinematography: Takahide Shibanushi
- Edited by: Hiroshi Okuda
- Music by: Shinkichi Mitsumune
- Production company: Cine Bazar
- Distributed by: Toei Company
- Release date: January 9, 1998
- Running time: 110 minutes (theatrical version); 112 minutes (SR-Ban version)
- Country: Japan
- Language: Japanese
- Budget: ¥100 million
- Box office: US (2025 GKIDS Films Release) - $91,796

Love & Pop (ラブ&ポップ, Rabu ando Poppu) is a 1998 Japanese experimental coming-of-age film directed and co-written by Hideaki Anno, based on the novel Topaz II by Ryū Murakami. It was Anno's first live-action feature-length film.

The film was shot almost entirely on hand-held digital cameras and contains unorthodox camera work, including many different mounted camera positions, such as on a model train riding on tracks. The film also flips from widescreen to fullscreen, distorts (with effects such as a fisheye lens), confuses, and makes use of overlays stacked in layers to convey the character's emotions.

An English-language DVD was released in 2004 by Kino on Video. In 2025, GKIDS announced that they would hold movie screenings for a 2K restoration of the film in North America. The film was first screened at the IFC Center in New York City on February 21, 2025 and then at the American Cinematheque Los Feliz theater on February 23, 2025.

== Plot ==
Hiromi Yoshii is a high school girl living in Tokyo. She has three friends: Nao, who is interested in computers, Chieko, who is older and more mature, and Chisa, who plans to drop out of school to become a professional dancer. Hiromi feels that she lacks direction in comparison to her friends. All four routinely go out with older men in exchange for payment.

In Shibuya, Hiromi meets Nao and Chieko. Nao has borrowed a cellphone from a gay man, Kobayashi, to leave voice messages for a dating service to gather contacts from young men. The three girls leave voice messages with the phone, stating that they are interested in meeting men that day.

They meet with Chisa and go shopping for swimwear. Hiromi finds a topaz ring on sale. She cannot afford it, but plans to gather the money and buy it before the shop closes that day. The girls go to karaoke with an older man, who pays them in exchange for chewing grapes for him. The four split the money and part ways.

Hiromi receives a phone call from Kobayashi's boyfriend, Yoshio, who says that Kobayashi's kitten is sick, and he is leaving Kobayashi. Hiromi checks the messages she has received from interested men. She takes a taxi to meet one, Uehara, who pays her to pose as his girlfriend in a video rental store. In the adult video section, Uehara grabs Hiromi's hand and uses it to masturbate. Hiromi runs away; Uehara pays her anyway.

Hiromi receives a call from Kobayashi, and relays the information from Yoshio. She meets another man, who calls himself Captain EO and carries a Fuzzball stuffed toy. At a love hotel, they talk and Hiromi fixes the stuffed toy. When Hiromi takes a shower, Captain EO intrudes and berates her for choosing to go on a date with him. He admits that he had planned to assault Hiromi, rape her, and steal her money, and brandishes a Taser. He throws a few coins at her and leaves.

Hiromi meets Kobayashi to return the cell phone. He thanks her for saving his cat's life, but says that he and Yoshio have broken up. Hiromi repeats one of Captain EO's remarks, to which Kobayashi replies that whoever had said that must see great value in her. At home, Hiromi ruminates on her life and her failure to buy the ring and falls asleep. The girls walk in ankle-deep water in a drainage ditch.

== Cast ==
- Asumi Miwa - Hiromi Yoshii (吉井 裕美, Yoshii Hiromi)
- Kirari - Chisa Noda (野田 知佐, Noda Chisa)
- Hirono Kudō - Nao Yokoi (横井 奈緒, Yokoi Nao)
- Yukie Nakama - Chieko Takahashi (高橋 千恵子, Takahashi Chieko)
- Hitomi Miwa - Hiromi's older sister
- Mitsuru Hirata - Kagegawa
- Mitsuru Fukikoshi - Yoshimura
- Moro Morooka - Yazaki
- Tooru Tezuka - Uehara
- Ikkei Watanabe - Kobayashi
- Tadanobu Asano - Captain EO
- Kotono Mitsuishi - Radio DJ (voice)
- Akira Ishida - Yoshio (voice)
- Megumi Hayashibara - Telephone Dialing Voice
- Nana Okada - Hiromi's Mother
- Leo Morimoto - Hiromi's Father
- Naomi Kawase - Hiromi's narration (voice)
- Minoru Torihada - Man giving speech on the street

== Production ==
=== Background ===
When a friend recommended Ryū Murakami's Fascism of Love and Fantasy to Anno, he found it so fascinating that he read several of Murakami's works. The work he was most attached to was The World Five Minutes Later, but he also felt that it would be "unrealistic to adapt it into a film." He was also reading this work at the same time, and thought, "This worldview is realistic, and sponsors would be willing to provide funding," so he submitted a proposal directly to Murakami's side.

Anno commented on the film, "Hiromi, Chisa, Nao, and Chieko seem like they could be found anywhere, yet they're nowhere. I thought they were 'high school girls filled with an old man's dreams,' and found it fascinating."

"If you don't start or get the things you want or desire when you want them, they will eventually disappear from you. This film depicts the current state of high school girls through compensated dating, a way to 'get what you want' and 'seek connection with others.'"

When Murakami met Anno, Anno confided in him a clear production plan: "This work could be made into an animation, but it's not suited to that. It would be better as a live-action film." "I want to shoot it with a home digital video camera", "I want to do it in a late-night TV slot", and "I want to keep the budget low." Murakami immediately approved the film after hearing Anno's concept, which not only included his ideals of "I want to film this scene" and "I want that person to play the lead role", but also Anno's stance as a producer.

The production budget was 100 million yen.

While the final script was prepared in advance, the cast received daily script changes. Sometimes, the script itself did not even include instructions on how the filming would be done.

=== Filming ===
Each scene was shot using five video cameras simultaneously, totaling 160 hours of footage for a running time of 110 minutes. Edited offline using Avid Technology's state-of-the-art nonlinear editing system, it was the first Japanese film to be produced entirely digitally. The use of video cameras (MiniDV) was primarily due to the need for mobility on set, as the entire production was done on location in Shibuya. Regarding this production system, Anno commented, "When making a Japanese film on 35mm film, running three cameras simultaneously is a luxury and difficult to procure. With video cameras, tape was cheap, and I was able to borrow cameras from friends, so there were times when I was able to run six cameras simultaneously." As a result, a single scene could take up to 30 hours, with dozens of takes. Miwa recalled, "Lines that I couldn't remember at first ended up being memorized." The camera used was a Sony DCR-VX1000.
