= Neon Genesis Evangelion: Death & Rebirth =

1997 film directed by Hideaki Anno

- Theatrical release poster
- Directed by: Hideaki Anno; Masayuki; Kazuya Tsurumaki
- Written by: Hideaki Anno; Akio Satsukawa
- Produced by: Mitsuhisa Ishikawa
- Starring: Megumi Ogata; Megumi Hayashibara; Yūko Miyamura; Kotono Mitsuishi
- Cinematography: Hisao Shirai; Yōichi Kuroda
- Edited by: Sachiko Miki
- Music by: Shirō Sagisu
- Production companies: Gainax; Tatsunoko Production ("Death"); Production I.G. ("Rebirth")
- Distributed by: Toei
- Release date: March 15, 1997
- Running time: 72 minutes ("Death"); 28 minutes ("Rebirth"); 68 minutes ("Death [True]"); 68 minutes ("Death [True]²", excluding intermission); 160 minutes ("Revival")
- Country: Japan
- Language: Japanese
- Box office: ¥1.87 billion

Neon Genesis Evangelion: Death & Rebirth (新世紀エヴァンゲリオン 劇場版 シト新生, Shin Seiki Evangerion Gekijō-ban Shi to Shinsei), also romanized in Japan as Evangelion:Death and Evangelion:Rebirth, is a 1997 Japanese animated apocalyptic science fiction film. It is the first installment of the Neon Genesis Evangelion feature film project and consists of two parts. The project, whose overarching title translates literally to New Era Evangelion: The Movie, was released in response to the success of the TV series, and a strong demand by fans for an alternate ending. Its components have since been re-edited and re-released several times.

== Plot ==
=== Evangelion:Death ===
The first section, Evangelion:Death, is a 're-cap,' editing together scenes from the first 24 episodes of Neon Genesis Evangelion in the form of a clip show, along with some additional animation created after the show's original broadcast. This includes scenes from the original show re-drawn shot-for-shot, entirely new shots augmenting existing sequences, and linking segments based around the premise of the four main characters playing Pachelbel's Canon as a string quartet. Some of the additional shots and re-drawn animation would later be re-edited into the extended, 'Home Video Versions' of episodes 21-24 included on the Japanese VHS/Laserdisc, and American and European Platinum Collection releases of the TV series, commonly known in the west as the "Director's Cut" versions, though there is no clear substantiation of director Hideaki Anno's role in these. Death ends with credits accompanied by a double string quartet arrangement of Pachelbel's Canon.

Evangelion:Death(True) screened on the Japanese satellite TV channel WOWOW; this second cut of Evangelion:Death was re-edited by Masayuki, who held multiple creative roles throughout the franchise's production, removing some of the extra footage new to the feature. This was released on home video for the first time as part of the Archives of Evangelion DVD box set on August 26, 2015.

=== Evangelion:Rebirth ===
The second section, Evangelion:Rebirth, consists of approximately 24 minutes of entirely new animation that would eventually form the first third of the alternate ending film The End of Evangelion, released four months later as the second stage in the Neon Genesis Evangelion: Death & Rebirth project. Serving as a preview while End was still in production, Rebirth only covers the initial preparations of the Human Instrumentality Project and the invasion of the Geofront by the JSSDF, ending with the arrival of the Mass Production Evas. Because of its unfinished state, there are differences between Rebirth and the portion of the finished The End of Evangelion it covers. These differences include editing, shots that were later re-drawn entirely, and soundtrack cues that were replaced or further edited. The section ends with credits accompanied by the song "Soul's Refrain" by Yoko Takahashi.

== Voice cast ==
Character	Japanese	English	
Character	Japanese	Gaijin Productions/Manga (2002)	VSI/Netflix (2019)
Shinji Ikari	Megumi Ogata	Spike Spencer	Casey Mongillo
Misato Katsuragi	Kotono Mitsuishi	Allison Keith	Carrie Keranen
Rei Ayanami	Megumi Hayashibara	Amanda Winn-Lee	Ryan Bartley
Asuka Langley Soryu	Yūko Miyamura	Tiffany Grant	Stephanie McKeon
Kaworu Nagisa	Akira Ishida	Aaron Krohn	Clifford Chapin
Gendo Ikari	Fumihiko Tachiki	Tristan MacAvery	Ray Chase
Ryoji Kaji	Kōichi Yamadera	Aaron Krohn	Greg Chun
Ritsuko Akagi	Yuriko Yamaguchi	Sue Ulu	Erica Lindbeck
Kozo Fuyutsuki	Motomu Kiyokawa	Michael Ross	JP Karliak
Toji Suzuhara	Tomokazu Seki	Brett Weaver	Johnny Yong Bosch
Kensuke Aida	Tetsuya Iwanaga	Kurt Stoll	Ben Diskin
Makoto Hyuga	Hiro Yūki	Keith Burgess	Daniel MK Cohen
Shigeru Aoba	Takehito Koyasu	Jason C. Lee	Billy Kametz
Maya Ibuki	Miki Nagasawa	Amy Seeley	Christine Marie Cabanos
Keel Lorentz	Mugihito	Tom Booker	D.C. Douglas
Hikari Horaki	Junko Iwao	Kimberly Yates	Abby Trott
Pen Pen	Megumi Hayashibara	Amanda Winn-Lee	Cherami Leigh
Naoko Akagi	Mika Doi	Laura Chapman	
Yui Ikari	Megumi Hayashibara	Amanda Winn-Lee	
Kyoko Zeppelin Soryu	Maria Kawamura	Kimberly Yates	

== Production and release ==
Death and Rebirth were co-produced by Kadokawa Shoten, Gainax, TV Tokyo, Sega, and Toei.

The film opened in second place at the Japanese box office, just behind the opening of 101 Dalmatians. Between March and October 1997, Death and Rebirth earned a distributor rental income of ¥1.1 billion. The feature had a total gross of ¥1.87 billion.

On July 30, 2002, Manga Entertainment released Death and Rebirth on VHS and DVD in both dub and sub under the title Neon Genesis Evangelion: Death & Rebirth.

On July 26, 2005, Manga Entertainment released Death & Rebirth and The End of Evangelion together in the United States as a two-disc set.

The English production made similar creative changes in the dubbing of the film as had been made to The End of Evangelion.

== Revival of Evangelion ==
The final stage of the New Era Evangelion: The Movie project, a theatrical revival with the romanized title Revival of Evangelion was released on March 8, 1998, consisting of Death (True)² (a third, further edit of Death(True), with a few removed shots crucial to the plot edited back in) followed by a four-minute intermission and then the finished The End of Evangelion. Some home video releases of Revival from the mid-2000s were given the title Neon Genesis Evangelion: The Feature Film. In 2015, Revival was released on the Japanese Renewal of Evangelion Blu-ray box set along with End and the original theatrical cuts of Death and Rebirth. Death (True)² is also the version most widely released in the West, having been opted by Netflix and GKIDS for its distribution service and Blu-ray box set respectively. Death (True)² and End are separated in these releases, removing the intermission.

== Reception ==
Chris Beveridge from Mania gave it an overall "A−" score. Robert Nelson of T.H.E.M. Anime Reviews gave it a 3 out of 5. Japan Cinema gave the film a C+. Adam Arnold from Animefringe gave the film an overall score of 72%.

== See also ==
- The End of Evangelion
