= Re: Cutie Honey =

2004 original video animation

- Cover of Re: Cutie Honey DVD

Re:キューティーハニー (Re:Kyūtī Hanī)
- Created by: Go Nagai
- Original video animation
- Directed by: Hideaki Anno (chief); Hiroyuki Imaishi (1); Naoyuki Itō (2); Masayuki (3)
- Produced by: Hiromi Kitazaki; Toshiyuki Matsui; Hiroki Satō; Michio Kawabata
- Written by: Kazuki Nakashima
- Music by: Susumu Ueda
- Studio: Toei Animation (Note: Animation production assistance (アニメーション制作協力) for all episodes provided by Gainax.)
- Licensed by: NA: Discotek Media
- Released: July 24, 2004 – September 25, 2004
- Runtime: 45 minutes
- Episodes: 3

Re: Cutie Honey (Re:キューティーハニー, Ri Kyūtī Hanī) is a three-episode OVA (original video animation) series based on the 2004 tokusatsu (live-action) film Cutie Honey, both adaptations of the 1970s manga written and illustrated by Go Nagai. The series was produced by Toei Animation, directed by Hideaki Anno, and shown on the Animax satellite television network in 2004. The first episode aired on July 24, two months after the live-action film was released. DVD releases for each episode followed, with the first released on September 21. The series tells the same story as the film, but contains nudity and additional character development. On 2003, Anno also collaborated with Ito on the manga Cutie Honey a Go Go!

== Plot ==
A mysterious organization known as Panther Claw make their presence known by terrorizing Tokyo and giving the cops a run for their money. Police are further baffled by the appearance of a lone cosplaying vigilante who thwarts all of Panther Claw's evil schemes before disappearing. That vigilante is Honey Kisaragi, the result of the late Dr. Kisaragi's prize experiment. A master of disguise, Honey can instantly alter her physical appearance and outfits. But with a push of the heart-shaped button on her choker, she transforms herself into Cutie Honey, the scantily clad, sword-wielding warrior of love.

== Characters ==
=== Protagonists ===
Honey Kisaragi / Cutie Honey (如月 ハニー, Kisaragi Hanī)
Voiced by: Yui Horie (Japanese); Jessica Calvello (English)
Honey Kisaragi works as a temp at an office in Tokyo. She is also an android out to get revenge against Panther Claw for killing her father. Her weapons are a boomerang, a rapier, a lance, and her "I System" (Imaginary Induction System.)
Seiji Hayami (早見 青児, Hayami Seiji)
Voiced by: Hideo Ishikawa (Japanese); Wayne Grayson (English)
Seiji Hayami claims to be a journalist, but he seems to know a good deal about the technology that Cutie Honey utilizes, and seems to be studying her closely.
Natsuko Aki / "Nat" (秋 夏子, Aki Natsuko)
Voiced by: Junko Noda (Japanese); Natalie Van Sistine (English)
Inspector Natsuko Aki is in charge of bringing Panther Claw to justice. She has incredible aim with firearms and can be fearless even if it is raining bullets. Initially a harsh, no-nonsense person, she and Honey eventually grow close as Honey's courage and cheerfulness begin to break their personality gaps.
Kyōko Izumiya (泉谷 京子, Izumiya Kyōko)
Voiced by: Kazuko Sugiyama (Japanese); Pam Dougherty (English)
She is the janitor at Honey's work who's always bringing onigiri for her. She is later revealed to be more than just a simple janitor.

=== Panther Claw ===
Gold Claw (ゴールド・クロー, Gōrudo Kurō)
Voiced by: Noriko Uemura (Japanese); Alice Himora (English)
The Club of the Four Generals, Gold Claw is the first truly powerful foe that Honey faces. Heavily armed and armored, Honey needs to be resourceful to find a way to defeat her. Gold Claw has Destroyer Panther, Doctor Panther, and Scope Panther as goons. She is killed by Honey in the first episode.
Cobalt Claw (コバルト・クロー, Kobaruto Kurō)
Voiced by: Mami Kingetsu (Japanese); Tara Langella (English)
The Diamond of the Four Generals, Cobalt Claw has a pair of tentacles that extend out of her mask that can wrap around a foe and generate an incredible amount of electrical current. Cobalt relishes the opportunity to show off her strength to Sister Jill and defeating Cutie Honey. She is killed by Scarlet Claw in her plan to appease Sister Jill.
Scarlet Claw (スカーレット・クロー, Sukāretto Kurō)
Voiced by: Hiromi Konno (Japanese); Erica Schroeder (English)
The Heart of the Four Generals, Scarlet Claw is a pint-size villain with an umbrella that can vaporize a foe. Very manipulative, Scarlet Claw is able to turn the general populace against Honey. Scarlet's goons include Tank Panther, Bazooka Panther, and Sky Panther. She is killed by Honey's Lightning Lancer in the second episode.
Black Claw (ブラック・クロー, Burakku Kurō)
Voiced by: Yumi Touma (Japanese); Kayleigh McKee (English)
The Spade of The Four Generals, Black Claw's primary attack is with vocal sound waves that she amplifies with her microphone and staff. As much as she tries to comprehend, she cannot figure out what Sister Jill truly desires. A homage to Baron Ashura and Count Brocken, the classic Mazinger Z villains also created by Go Nagai.
Sister Jill (シスター・ジル, Shisutā Jiru)
Voiced by: Kazue Ikura (Japanese); Marissa Lenti (English)
Sister Jill is the leader of Panther Claw. The Four Generals of Panther Claw act to realize her wishes. Her preferred weapon is a whip which can summon shadow hands. Jill is served by The Four Generals of Panther Claw as well as a mysterious butler. In the last episode she possesses a demonic body that heavily resembles Demon Lord Dante, one of Go Nagai's earliest works. It is also revealed that she was the first attempt of Dr. Kisaragi to replicate Honey after her initial death through the use of nano-machines.

== Production ==
The series makes references to other anime such as Lupin III and Sailor Moon, and many references to Kill Bill. As with prior Cutie Honey series, the OVA also features cameos from some of Go Nagai's other works, including Akira Fudo of Devilman, Koji Kabuto and Boss from Mazinger Z, Duke Fried from Grendizer, and previous Cutie Honey regular Danbei.

Each of the episodes in the series had its own director in addition to Anno; a reviewer on the Gainax fansite Gainax Pages said that the episodes have such differing styles that "each episode director must have had considerable autonomy".

Re: Cutie Honey, like the 1970s manga, portrays Cutie Honey with dark-reddish eyes, not green eyes as in New Cutie Honey and Cutie Honey Flash; in Re: Cutie Honey she also wears an outfit that covers more of her cleavage than the other versions, but shows her midriff and other parts.

The opening theme, used for both the OVA and the live-action movie, is "Cutie Honey," whilst the ending theme is "Into your Heart", both performed by Koda Kumi.

== Media ==
=== Series ===
The Re: Cutie Honey Complete DVD, released on September 21, 2005, includes a CD drama starring the four voice actresses that have voiced Honey up to then: Eiko Masuyama (the '70s series), Michiko Neya (New Cutie Honey), Ai Nagano (Cutie Honey Flash), and Yui Horie (Re: Cutie Honey).

==== Episodes ====
1. Volume Heaven
2. Volume Earth
3. Volume Human
4. Volume Harmony (Drama CD)

== Reception ==
The OVA's visuals have generated mixed reactions; an Anime on DVD review praises the vibrancy of the digital ink and paint, saying it "brings Honey's world to life" compared to older Cutie Honey series. However, a review on the website Japan Hero criticizes the animation, calling it "distorted", "garish", "sub par and truly unsettling", except in "the fantastic title animation". Still, the series itself has been praised for its story and music, and has been called "creative, funny, and never repetitive". Erica Friedman of Okazu argued that the series strikes the "perfect balance between honestly good and enjoyably bad," adding that the anime does a "spectacular use of fanservice" as Na-chan tries to bring Cutie back to life, noting that in the series epilogue Na-chan and Honey "appear to be...a couple." She concluded it is a positive for those fans who would not mind their yuri with "a shaker or two of parody, perversion and pathos."
