= Cutie Honey (film) =

2004 Japanese film directed by Hideaki Anno

- Theatrical release poster
- Directed by: Hideaki Anno
- Screenplay by: Hideaki Anno; Rumi Takahashi
- Based on: Cutie Honey by Go Nagai
- Produced by: Morio Amagi; Motoo Kawabata; Tatsuya Kato; Morio Imagi; Tzadik Penimi
- Starring: Eriko Sato; Mikako Ichikawa; Jun Murakami; Mitsuhiro Oikawa; Hairi Katagiri; Shie Kohinata; Mayumi Shintani; Eisuke Sasai; Toru Tezuka; Ryō Kase; Ryo Iwamatsu; Suzuki Matsuo; Kyusaku Shimada; Ryuhei Matsuda; Masaki Kyomoto; Hideko Yoshida
- Cinematography: Kosuke Matsushima
- Edited by: Hiroshi Okuda
- Music by: Mikio Endō
- Production company: TOWANI
- Distributed by: Warner Bros. Pictures
- Release date: May 29, 2004
- Running time: 93 minutes
- Country: Japan
- Language: Japanese
- Box office: $4.3 million

Cutie Honey (Japanese: キューティーハニー, Hepburn: Kyūtī Hanī) is a 2004 Japanese superhero film directed and co-written by Hideaki Anno, adapted from the manga series Cutie Honey created by Go Nagai. The film stars the Japanese model Eriko Sato as the crimefighting android Cutie Honey and retells the story of her battle to defend humanity and avenge her father against Panther Claw.

Cutie Honey was followed two months later by an OVA series, Re: Cutie Honey, based on the film. In North America, the film was released direct-to-DVD on April 17, 2007, by Bandai Entertainment. Previously, the 1994 New Cutie Honey OVA was the only incarnation of Cutie Honey to have been commercially released in the United States.

== Plot ==
Honey Kisaragi is a cheerful woman living in Tokyo. Following a fatal accident a year prior, Honey's father, Professor Kisaragi, revived her by transferring her mind into an android body using nanotechnology called the I-System. Honey is a skilled swordsman, fighter, and master of disguise, going by the alter ego of Cutie Honey. She maintains a day job as an office temp, but her tardiness and airheaded personality irritate her colleagues.

Professor Kisaragi was murdered by Panther Claw, a terrorist organization, led by the tree-like Sister Jill, who seeks to use the I-System to perfect and sustain her beauty. Sister Jill is aided by a loyal butler, and her generals Gold Claw, Cobalt Claw, Scarlet Claw, and Black Claw. Kisaragi's colleague, Dr. Ryo Utsugi, becomes Honey's caretaker, whom she affectionately calls her uncle.

Utsugi is taken captive by Gold Claw, who is confronted by the police, led by the tightly wound Natsuko Aki. Cutie Honey intervenes, rescuing Utsugi and defeats Gold Claw, but their battle destroys the Tokyo Bay Aqua-Line. Natsuko attempts to arrest Honey, but she flees. Dr. Utsugi is captured by Panther Claw. Natsuko is pressured by her superiors to solve Panther Claw's crimes, particularly the disappearance of women across Japan, unaware Jill is using them to maintain her life force.

Honey and Natsuko meet the suave Seiji Hayami, a journalist and NSA agent, who informs them of Panther Claw's plans. Natsuko confronts Honey at work for further information, but they are attacked by Cobalt Claw in an elevator. An enraged Honey pushes her powers into overdrive, burning Cobalt to death. Natsuko lets Cutie stay the night at her home, but asks her to leave the next day. Cutie falls into depression, whilst Natsuko is suspended by her superiors. Honey, Natsuko, and Seiji spend a night getting drunk and singing karaoke. In the morning, Jill's butler invites the trio to the hidden Jill Tower, offering Honey the chance to rescue Utsugi is exchange for merging with Jill.

Sister Jill executes Gold Claw for her past failures, then raises her fortress beneath Tokyo Tower. Honey and Natsuko separately move to rescue Utsugi. Honey is confronted by Scarlet Claw, whom she defeats, but Black Claw executes Scarlet Claw for retreating. Honey battles Black Claw, killing him with her Honey Boomerang, but is drained of her energy in the fight. Natsuko confronts the butler, who promises to free Utsugi if she takes his place to bait Honey. Seiji frees the captured women by using an anti-nanotechnology device.

Honey confronts Jill and her butler, agreeing to merge with Jill in order to free Natsuko and Utsugi. Natsuko fires Seiji's gun at Honey's choker, activating her transformation. Honey and Jill find themselves in a shared state of consciousness, where they experience Honey's cherished memories with her father. Encouraged by Honey to embrace love, Jill transforms into a small flower, which her butler lovingly protects. Jill Tower collapses once Honey and her friends escape. Honey, Natsuko, and Seiji decide to open a private investigation firm.

== Cast ==
- Eriko Sato as Honey Kisaragi / Cutie Honey, a lively and carefree android who doubles as a crimefighter
- Mikako Ichikawa as Natsuko Aki, an uptight police inspector
- Jun Murakami as Seiji Hayami, a charming journalist and NSA agent
- Hairi Katagiri as Gold Claw, the egotistical first general of Panther Claw
- Shie Kohinata as Cobalt Claw, the contortionist-like second general of Panther Claw
  - Kohinata also portrays Honey's colleague Rinko Terada
- Mayumi Shintani as Scarlet Claw, the playful but cowardly third general of Panther Claw
- Mitsuhiro Oikawa as Black Claw, the theatrical fourth general of Panther Claw
- Eisuke Sasai as Sister Jill, the ancient leader of Panther Claw
- Masaki Kyomoto as Dr. Ryo Utsugi, a scientist who is Honey's honorary uncle
- Ryo Iwamatsu as Goko, Natsuko's subordinate
- Ryo Kase as Todoroki, Natsuko's subordinate
- Suzuki Matsuo as Honey's office manager

Cutie Honey creator Go Nagai makes a cameo as a bystander whose car is crushed by Cutie Honey, whilst film director Hideaki Anno appears as an office worker.

== Reception ==
Ilya Garger of Time said that Cutie Honey was more like the "tamer" 1970s anime version than the original manga, with campy "over-the-top" acting and "unpolished" CGI effects. Garger added that "much of the film seems devoted to giving people a chance to ogle Eriko Sato in an array of fetching costumes—and in all fairness, she does an excellent job of being oglable". A Variety review agreed with those points: it called the movie "an embarrassment of kitsches" with "camp pleasures and candy-coated, comic-book giddiness" that has "more humor and a lot less perversion" than the manga, and praised Sato as "a highly marketable plus as the sexy superhero who shouts 'Honey, flash!'", but said its CGI and matte effects were "crude".

On Allmovie, Jason Gibner wrote that the film's "scenes where Honey lounges around in nothing but a white bra and panties for extended periods of time" give "a feeling of unpleasant and unexpected sleaziness", despite being aimed at children with villains similar to those from Power Rangers /Super Sentai and the childish heroine Honey. While Gibner said that Sato's role as Honey is "hard not to enjoy", he considered the film an unsatisfying "noisy thing" with an incoherent story.

At the Japanese box office, the film grossed approximately ¥480 million (around US$4.3 million). Its underperformance was cited as one of the factors contributing to the financial collapse of Towani, a production company involved in the project. Over time, Cutie Honey has gained a cult following, particularly among fans of camp cinema and tokusatsu productions.
