= Hideaki Anno =

Japanese animator, filmmaker, producer, and seiyū (born 1960)

- 庵野秀明
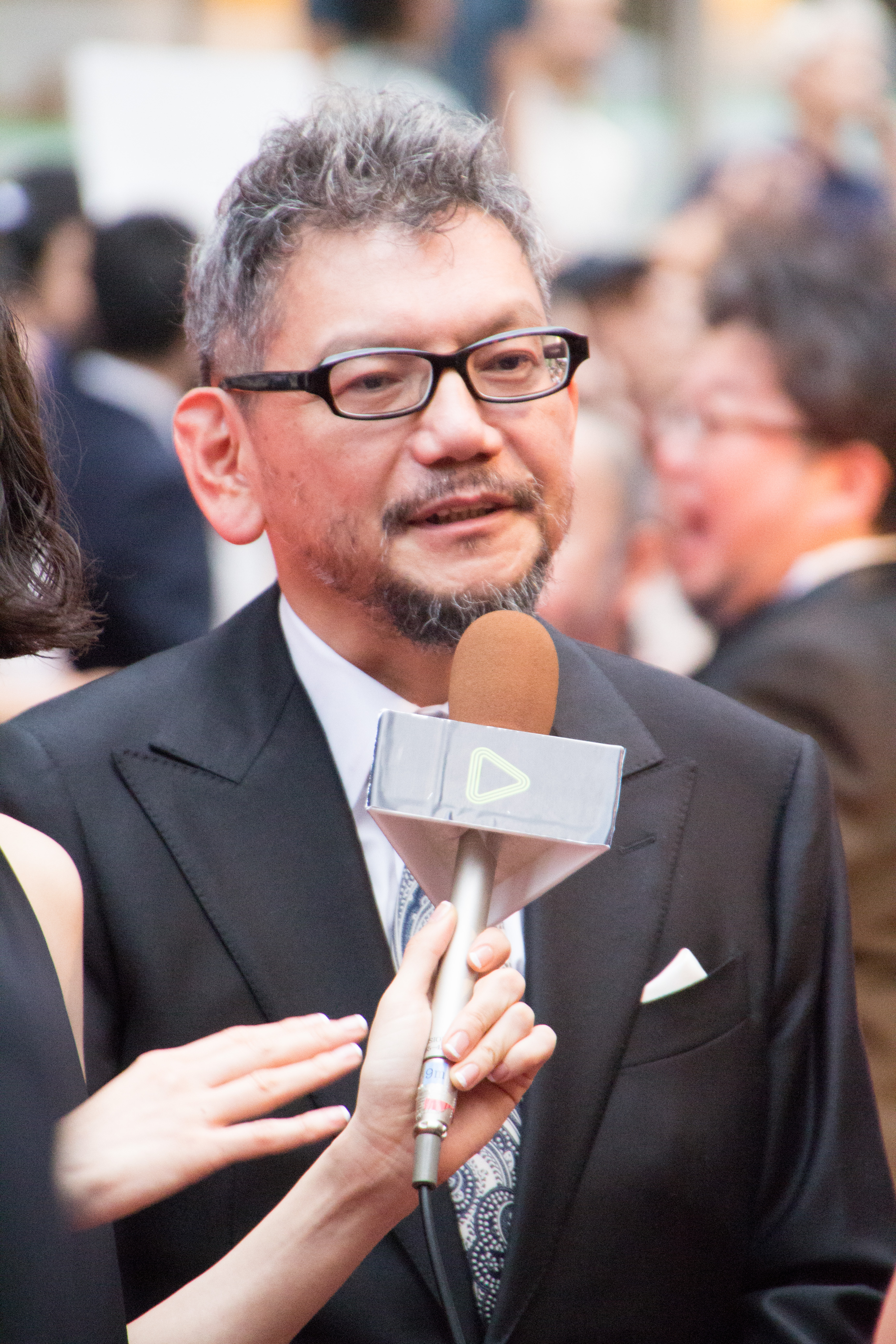
- Anno at the premiere of Shin Godzilla in July 2016
- Born: May 22, 1960 (age 66); Ube, Yamaguchi, Japan
- Occupations: Animator; director; screenwriter; producer; actor
- Years active: 1981–present
- Notable work: Daicon III and IV Opening Animations (1981-1983); Gunbuster (OVA 1988–1989); Nadia: The Secret of Blue Water (TV 1990–1991); Neon Genesis Evangelion (TV 1995–1996); The End of Evangelion (1997); Rebuild of Evangelion (2007–2021); Kare Kano (TV 1998–1999); Shin Godzilla (2016); Shin Ultraman (2022); Shin Kamen Rider (2023)
- Spouse: Moyoko Anno (m. 2002)
- Website: khara.co.jp/hideakianno/

Hideaki Anno (Japanese: 庵野 秀明, Hepburn: Anno Hideaki; born May 22, 1960) is a Japanese animator, filmmaker, and actor. His most celebrated creation, the Evangelion franchise, has had a significant influence on the anime television industry and Japanese popular culture. Anno's style is defined by his postmodernist approach and the extensive portrayal of characters' thoughts and emotions.

Anno began his career while attending Osaka University of Arts as an animator for the anime series The Super Dimension Fortress Macross (1982–1983), and produced the Daicon III and IV Opening Animations. He did not gain recognition until the release of his work on Hayao Miyazaki's 1984 film Nausicaä of the Valley of the Wind. Anno went on to become one of the co-founders of Gainax in December 1984. He worked as an animation director for their first feature-length film, Royal Space Force: The Wings of Honnêamise (1987), and ultimately became Gainax's premiere anime director, leading the majority of the studio's projects, including Gunbuster (1988) and Nadia: The Secret of Blue Water (1990–1991).

Anno's next project was the anime television series Neon Genesis Evangelion (1995–1996). Timing constraints at Gainax also forced Anno to replace the planned ending of Evangelion with two episodes set in the main characters' minds. In 1997, Gainax launched a project to re-adapt Evangelion's scrapped ending into a feature-length film. Budgeting issues left the film unfinished, and the completed 27 minutes of animation were included as the second act of Evangelion: Death and Rebirth. Eventually, the project culminated in The End of Evangelion, a two-act film that served as a finale to Neon Genesis Evangelion. Anno wrote and directed the Rebuild of Evangelion film series from 2007 to 2021, written to be more accessible to non-fans than the original anime series and films were.

Anno's other directorial works include Daicon Film's Return of Ultraman (1983), Gunbuster (1988), Kare Kano (1998), Love & Pop (1998), Shiki-Jitsu (2000), Cutie Honey (2004), Re: Cutie Honey (2004), and Shin Godzilla (2016), with the latter film marking the beginning of the Shin trilogy of tokusatsu franchise reboots, followed by Shin Ultraman (2022) and Shin Kamen Rider (2023). Several of Anno's anime have won the Animage Anime Grand Prix award, including Nadia: The Secret of Blue Water in 1990, Neon Genesis Evangelion in 1995 and 1996, and The End of Evangelion in 1997.

== Biography ==
=== Childhood and early education ===
The son of Fumiko and Takuya Anno, Anno was born in Ube, Yamaguchi; he attended Wakō Kindergarten, Unoshima Municipal Elementary School, Fujiyama Municipal Junior High School, and Yamaguchi Prefectural Ube High School where he was noted for his interest in artwork and making short films for Japanese Cultural Festivals.

=== Early work ===
Anno began his career while attending Osaka University of Arts as an animator for the anime series The Super Dimension Fortress Macross (1982–1983). Wrapped up in producing the DAICON III and IV Opening Animations with his fellow students, and busy making self-financed films, Anno stopped paying his tuition, eventually getting expelled from Osaka University of Arts. He did not gain recognition until the release of his work on Hayao Miyazaki's 1984 film Nausicaä of the Valley of the Wind. Running short on animators, the film's production studio posted an ad in the famous Japanese animation magazine Animage, announcing that they were in desperate need of more animators. Anno, in his early twenties at the time, read the ad and headed down to the film's studio, where he met with Miyazaki and showed him some of his drawings. Impressed with his ability, Miyazaki hired him to draw some of the most complicated scenes near the end of the movie, and valued his work highly.

Anno went on to become one of the co-founders of Gainax in December 1984. He worked as an animation director for their first feature-length film, Royal Space Force: The Wings of Honnêamise (1987), and ultimately became Gainax's premiere anime director, leading the majority of the studio's projects, including Gunbuster (1988) and Nadia: The Secret of Blue Water (1990–1991). However, Anno fell into a four-year depression following Nadia – the series was handed down to him from NHK from an original concept by Hayao Miyazaki (upon which Castle in the Sky also is partly based) and he was given little creative control. In 1994, the minor planet 9081 Hideakianno was named after him by his old friend Akimasa Nakamura.

=== Neon Genesis Evangelion ===
Anno's next project was the anime television series Neon Genesis Evangelion (1995–1996). The series is set in a post-apocalyptic futurist version of Tokyo and follows humanity's struggle to survive against an onslaught of giant monsters known as Angels. He considers Evangelion a continuation of Nausicaä, done in his own way. Anno's history of clinical depression was the main source for the emphasis on the psychological aspects of its characters, as he wrote down on paper several of the trials and tribulations of his condition. For this and other reasons (although perhaps by design as well), Evangelion's plot became more introspective as the series progressed, despite being broadcast in a children's television timeslot. Anno felt that people should be exposed to the realities of life at as young an age as possible, and by the end of the series all attempts at traditional narrative logic were abandoned, as the final two episodes use an abstract atmosphere to explore the human psyche.

The show did not garner high ratings in Japan at its initial time slot, but after being moved to a later, more adult-oriented venue, it gained considerable popularity. Timing constraints at Gainax also forced Anno to replace the planned ending of Evangelion with two episodes set in the main characters' minds. In 1997, Gainax launched a project to re-adapt Evangelion's scrapped ending into a feature-length film. Budgeting issues left the film unfinished, and the completed 27 minutes of animation were included as the second act of Evangelion: Death and Rebirth. Eventually, the project culminated in The End of Evangelion, a three-act film that served as a finale to Neon Genesis Evangelion. In September 1999, Anno appeared on the NHK TV-documentary "Welcome Back for an Extracurricular Lesson, Senpai!", answering some Evangelion-related questions, including the origin of the name Evangelion, and teaching children about animation production.

=== Subsequent work ===
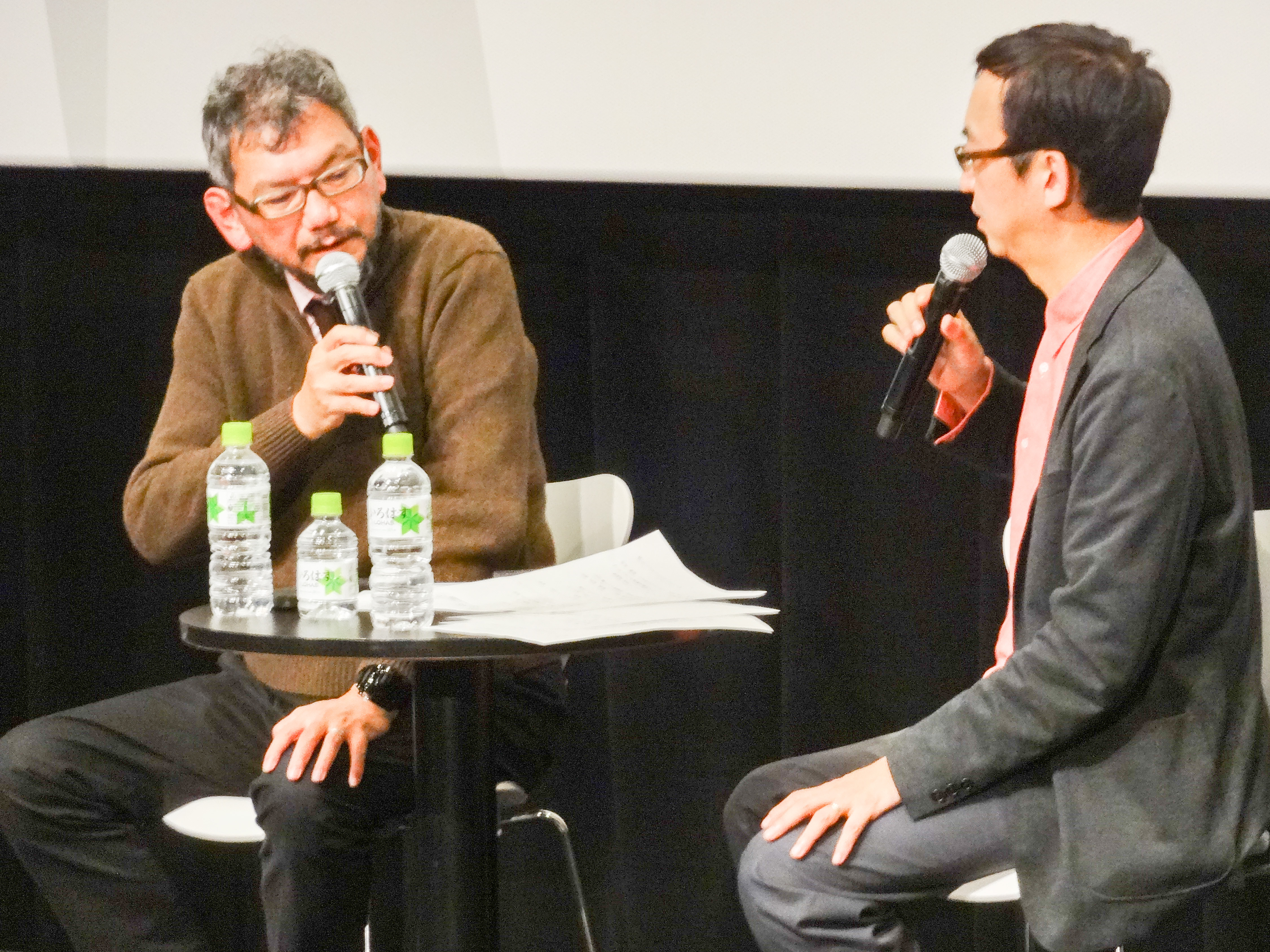
Anno with Ryūsuke Hikawa (October 30, 2014)

After Evangelion, Anno directed the 1998 anime series Kareshi Kanojo no Jijō (Kare Kano for short, also known in English as His and Her Circumstances), the first Gainax television series to be directly adapted from previously written material. During the production of Kare Kano, Anno became frustrated with the restrictions placed on the show by TV Tokyo after the Pokémon seizure incident and has rarely directed television anime since then. The director has also made forays into live-action films, beginning with Love & Pop (1998), a cinéma vérité-style film about enjo kosai ("compensated dating", a form of teenage prostitution) in Japan, of which a major portion was shot on miniature digital cameras with constantly shifting aspect ratios. He won Best New Director Award at 1998 Yokohama Film Festival for the film. Asumi Miwa who played the lead role won Best New Talent award. He and his friend Masayuki also directed the documentary "GAMERA1999" which documented the production of Gamera 3: Revenge of Iris. His second live-action film, Shiki-Jitsu (2000) ("Ritual Day" or "Ceremonial Day"), is the story of a burnt-out former animation director (played by popular indie director Shunji Iwai) who falls in love with a woman disconnected from reality. Though an experimental work like Love & Pop, this film was shot using the more traditional 2.35:1 aspect ratio and has a generally more polished presentation, eschewing the cinéma vérité grittiness of Anno's first live-action film. This movie earned him Best Artistic Contribution Award at Tokyo International Film Festival and very positive reviews.

Anno's third live-action film was Cutie Honey, based on Go Nagai's 1973 manga and anime series. Released in the summer of 2004, this lighthearted fantasy/superhero film was a stark contrast to his earlier, more realist live-action works. Later in 2004, Anno supervised but did not direct the three-part OVA, Re: Cutie Honey, which was respectively directed by Hiroyuki Imaishi (part 1), Takamichi Itō (part 2), and Masayuki (part 3). Released in 2005 was the movie Funky Forest (ナイスの森, Nice no Mori) which features Anno as part of the cast.

On August 1, 2006, Hideaki Anno's official website was updated with job listings for key animators and production staff at a company he founded, Studio Khara. In September 2006, Anno's departure from Gainax was reported in the October edition of the Japanese animation magazine Newtype. On September 9, 2006, Gainax's official website confirmed that Rebuild of Evangelion was in the works. The first three movies would be an alternate retelling of the TV series (including many new scenes, settings, backgrounds, characters), and the fourth movie would be a completely new conclusion to the story. Kazuya Tsurumaki and Masayuki would direct the movies while Yoshiyuki Sadamoto would provide character designs and Ikuto Yamashita would provide mechanical designs. Shinji Higuchi would provide storyboards for the first movie. The first was launched in Summer 2007, and the second and third were planned to be launched in 2008, however, the second installment was released by itself on June 27, 2009. The third movie was to be released simultaneously with the fourth; instead, the third movie was released on November 17, 2012, and the release date for the fourth movie in Japan was announced to be June 27, 2020. On February 17, 2007, Anno published an official statement on the Japanese Yahoo Portal for the films regarding his personal involvement and goals in their production. In October 2007, Hideaki Anno resigned from Gainax. In 2011 Anno co-produced the Koinobori Pictures movie Kantoku Shikkaku ("Failed Director"), directed by Katsuyuki Hirano featuring Yumika Hayashi.

In 2012, Anno was the curator of an exhibit entitled Tokusatsu- Special Effects Museum-Craftsmanship of Showa and Heisei Eras Seen Through Miniatures, held at the Museum of Contemporary Art Tokyo, featuring actual props and suits from many of Japan's tokusatsu films and TV shows. Anno also produced a short live-action film for the exhibit, entitled A Giant Warrior Descends on Tokyo, featuring the Giant Warrior-God from Studio Ghibli's animated film Nausicaä of the Valley of the Wind. He has gone on to work with Hayao Miyazaki and Studio Ghibli on several short films which have been shown at the Ghibli Museum. He also voiced the main character Jiro Horikoshi in Miyazaki's 2013 feature film The Wind Rises. He also designed the Space Battleship Yamato 2199 sci-fi anime television series opening sequence. In 2014, Anno and Studio Khara launched Japan Animator Expo, a series of original net animations made by various directors. In March 2015, it was announced that Anno would team up with close friend and Gainax cofounder Shinji Higuchi to write and codirect Shin Godzilla, the 2016 reboot of Toho's Godzilla franchise.

Anno wrote and directed Evangelion: 3.0+1.0 Thrice Upon a Time (2021), launched in March 2021, after being rescheduled twice due to the COVID-19 pandemic. He stated that Shinji's story was completed, but mentioned that he had more ideas set in Evangelion's world.

== Depictions ==
Anno has appeared in manga twice, both created by personal acquaintances. His wife, Moyoco Anno, wrote Insufficient Direction, a chronicle of their courtship and marriage and depicting Anno's "true face" as "the founder of the otaku cult". In 2007, a college-age version of him appeared alongside other Gainax founders Hiroyuki Yamaga, Takami Akai, and Toshio Okada in the Kazuhiko Shimamoto manga Aoi Honō. Anno attended Osaka University of Arts with Shimamoto. Aoi Honō was adapted into a live-action television drama in 2014, where Anno was played by actor Ken Yasuda. The 2014 animated series Shirobako has a cameo appearance by a character named "Mitsuaki Kanno", a caricature of Anno.

== Personal life ==
On March 26, 2002, Anno married Moyoco Anno, a manga artist. He is an agnostic and has stated that he has found Japanese spiritualism to be closest to his personal beliefs. Anno is also a vegetarian.

== Filmography ==
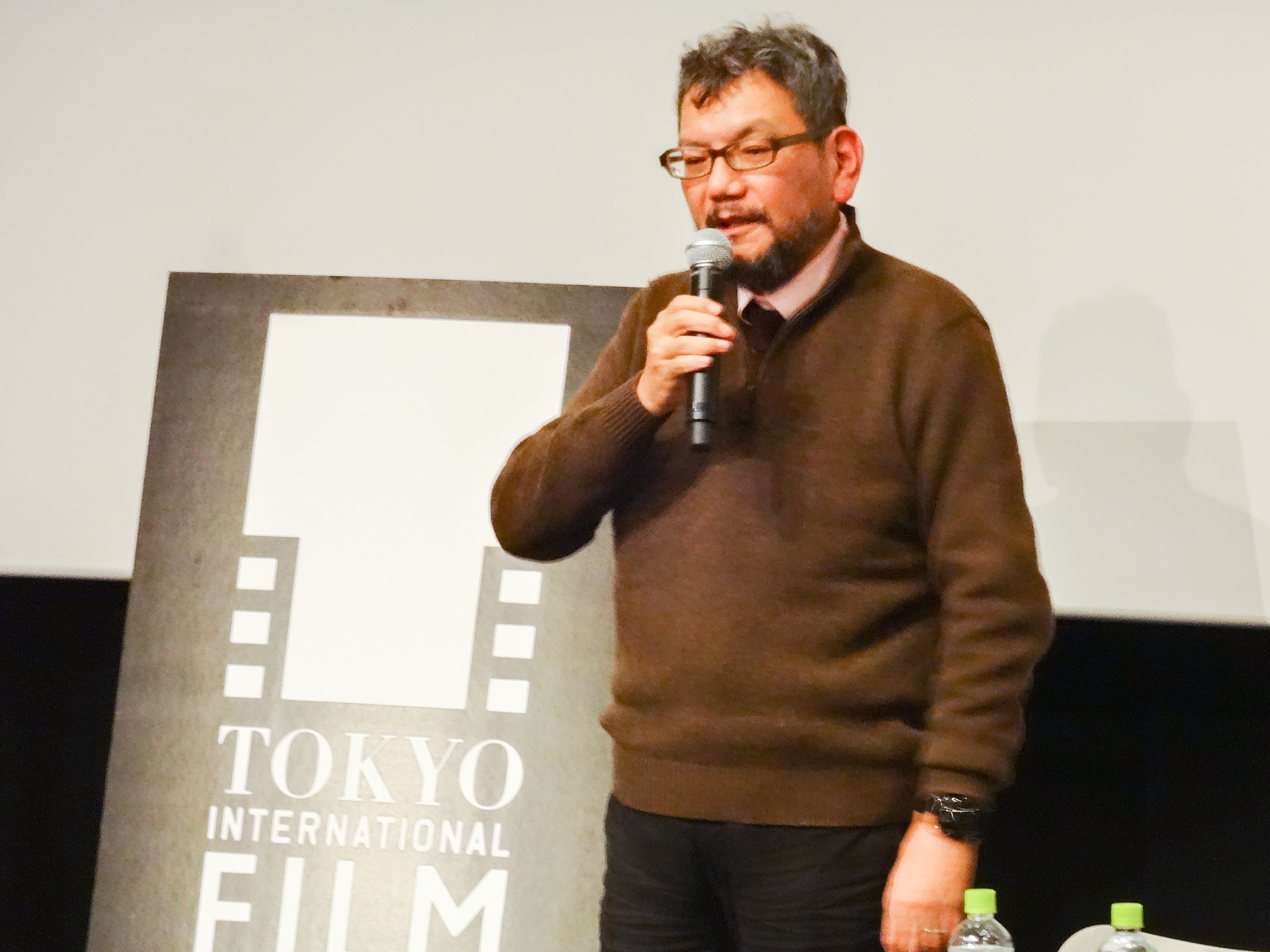
Anno participated in "The World of Hideaki Anno", Tokyo International Film Festival on October 30, 2014.

=== Films ===
Year	Title	Director	Writer	Producer	Animator	Storyboard artist	Notes
1985	The Complete Thunderbirds	Yes	Yes	No	No	No	Also editor.
1991	Nadia: The Secret of Blue Water-Nautilus Story I	Yes	Yes	No	Yes	Yes	Co-directed with Shinji Higuchi.
1991	Nadia: The Secret of Blue Water-Nautilus Story II	Yes	Yes	No	Yes	Yes	Co-directed with Shinji Higuchi.
1991	Nadia: The Secret of Blue Water-Nautilus Story III	Yes	Yes	No	Yes	Yes	Co-directed with Shinji Higuchi.
1997	Neon Genesis Evangelion: Death & Rebirth	Yes	Yes	No	Yes	Yes	Co-directed with Masayuki & Kazuya Tsurumaki
1997	The End of Evangelion	Yes	Yes	No	Yes	Yes	Co-directed with Kazuya Tsurumaki; Also lyrics writer "Komm, Susser Todd"
1998	Love & Pop	Yes	Yes	No	No	No	
1999	GAMERA1999	Yes	Yes	No	No	No	Documentary; Co-directed with Masayuki
2000	Shiki-Jitsu	Yes	Yes	No	No	No	
2004	Cutie Honey	Yes	Yes	No	No	No	
2006	Gunbuster: The Movie	Yes	Yes	Yes	Yes	Yes	
2006	Diebuster: The Movie	No	No	Yes	Yes	Yes	
2007	Evangelion: 1.0 You Are (Not) Alone	Yes	Yes	No	Yes	Yes	Co-directed with Masayuki & Kazuya Tsurumaki; Also design works
2009	Evangelion: 2.0 You Can (Not) Advance	Yes	Yes	Executive	Yes	Yes	Co-directed with Masayuki & Kazuya Tsurumaki; Also design works
2011	Kantoku Shikkaku	No	No	Yes	No	No	Documentary
2012	Evangelion: 3.0 You Can (Not) Redo	Yes	Yes	Executive	Yes	Yes	Co-directed with Mahiro Maeda, Kazuya Tsurumaki & Masayuki
2016	Shin Godzilla	Yes	Yes	No	No	Yes	Co-directed with Shinji Higuchi; Also co-editor
2021	Evangelion: 3.0+1.0 Thrice Upon a Time	Yes	Yes	Executive	Yes	Yes	Co-directed with Kazuya Tsurumaki, Katsuchi Nakayama & Mahiro Maeda
2022	Shin Ultraman	No	Yes	Yes	No	Yes	Also supervisor, co-editor, co-cinematographer, concept designer and logo designer
2023	Shin Kamen Rider	Yes	Yes	No	No	No	Also co-editor and costume designer
2025	Mobile Suit Gundam GQuuuuuuX: Beginning	No	Yes	No	Yes	Yes	

=== Short films ===
Year	Title	Director	Writer	Animator	Notes
1979	NAKAMUREDIER	Yes	No	No	Student film
1979	Proverb Dictionary: He Who Shots Often, Hits at Last!	Yes	Yes	Yes	Student film
1980	At the Bus Stop	Yes	Yes	Yes	Student film
1980	Tough Tire! SHADO Tire!	Yes	Yes	Yes	Student film
1983	Daicon Film's Return of Ultraman	Yes	No	No	
1995	Neon Genesis Evangelion: Genesis 0:0 – In the Beginning	Yes	Yes	Yes	Promotional short
2001	Ryusei-Kacho	Yes	Yes	No	
2002	Anime Tencho	Yes	No	Yes	
2002	The Invention of Destruction in the Imaginary Machines	Yes	Yes	No	
2003	The Girl and the Railway	Yes	Yes	No	Full Short film within his film Shiki-Jitsu
2003	Evangelion-Episode 26'Live Action Cut	Yes	Yes	No	Deleted live action scene from his film The End of Evangelion
2012	Giant God Warrior Appears in Tokyo	No	Yes	No	Also producer
2013	Peaceful Times (F02) Petit Film	Yes	No	Yes	
2019	Evangelion the Movie AVANT: 0706 Version	Yes	Yes	Yes	First 15 minutes of his film Evangelion: 3.0+1.0 Thrice Upon a Time; Also executive producer and storyboard artist
2023	Evangelion: 3.0 (-120min.)	Yes	No	No	

==== Producer only ====
Year	Title	Notes
2014	The Dragon Dentist	Executive producer
2014	Hill Climb Girl	Executive producer
2014	Carnage	Executive producer
2014	20min Walk from Nishi-Ogikubo Station, 2 Bedrooms, Living Room, Dining Room, Kitchen, 2mos Deposit, No Pets Allowed	Executive producer
2015	Yamadeloid	Producer
2015	Evangelion:Another Impact	Executive producer
2015	Sex and Violence with Machspeed	Executive producer
2015	Tsukikage no Tokio	Producer
2015	Neon Genesis: Impacts	Executive producer
2015	Cassette Girl	Executive producer
2016	Mobile Police Patlabor Reboot	Executive producer
2016	A Good Child's History Anime	Executive Producer; Also co-editor and photography
2023	Evangelion: 3.0 (-46)	Executive producer.

=== Television ===
Year	Title	Director	Writer	Animator	Storyboard	Notes
1988–1989	Gunbuster	Yes	Yes	Yes	Yes	
1990–1991	Nadia: The Secret of Blue Water	Yes	Yes	Yes	Yes	
1995–1996	Neon Genesis Evangelion	Yes	Yes	Yes	Yes	Also mechanical designer
1998–1999	Kare Kano (His and Her Circumstances)	Yes	Yes	Yes	Yes	
1999	Koume-chan ga Iku	Yes	Yes	No	No	TV Short Mini-series
2004	Re: Cutie Honey	Yes	No	Yes	Yes	TV movie
2025	Mobile Suit Gundam GQuuuuuuX	No	Yes	Yes	Yes	

== Animation / art work ==
=== Storyboards ===
- Mahoromatic: Automatic Maiden (2001)
- Magical Shopping Arcade Abenobashi (2002)
- Aim for the Top 2! Diebuster (2004–2006)
- Sugar Sugar Rune (2005–2006)
- Rebuild of Evangelion (2007–2021)
- Space Battleship Yamato 2199 (2012–2013)
- Mobile Suit Gundam GQuuuuuuX (2025)

=== Animator ===
- Daicon III and IV Opening Animations (1981, 1983)
- The Super Dimension Fortress Macross (1982–1983)
- Nausicaä of the Valley of the Wind (1984)
- The Super Dimension Fortress Macross: Do You Remember Love? (1984)
- Birth (1984)
- Cream Lemon (Episode 4) (1985–1987)
- Urusei Yatsura (Episode 133) (1984–1986)
- Urusei Yatsura 3: Remember My Love (1985)
- Royal Space Force: The Wings of Honnêamise (1987)
- Crystal Triangle (1987)
- Dangaioh (1987–1989)
- Battle Royal High School (1987)
- Metal Skin Panic MADOX-01 (1987)
- Grave of the Fireflies (1988)
- Baoh the Visitor (1989)
- Nadia: The Secret of Blue Water (1990–1991)
- Giant Robo: The Day the Earth Stood Still (1992–1998)
- Crimson Wolf (1993)
- Macross Plus (1994–1995)
- Macross Plus Movie Edition (1995)
- FLCL (2000–2001)
- Magical Shopping Arcade Abenobashi (2002)
- Aim for the Top 2! Diebuster (2004–2006)

=== Mechanical designer ===
- Daicon III and IV Opening Animations (1981, 1983) (Mecha designer and mechanical animator)
- Mobile Suit Gundam: Char's Counterattack (1988) (Mecha designer)
- Magical Shopping Arcade Abenobashi (2002) (Mechanical animator)

== Acting roles ==
Year	Title	Role
1983	Daicon Film's Return of Ultraman	Ultraman
1985	Yamata no Orochi no Gyakushū	TV reporter
1991	Otaku no Video	A Portrait of an Otaku interview (uncredited)
1998	Abunai deka forever the movie	–
2000–2001	FLCL	Voice of Miyu-Miyu (credited as "?")
2002	Frog River	Bar owner
2002	Magical Shopping Arcade Abenobashi	Cameo role in Episode 12 (uncredited)
2004	Cutie Honey	Office worker
2004	The Taste of Tea	Cameo, anime director
2004	Koi no Mon (Otakus in Love)	Cameo
2004	Funky Forest	Actor
2006	Nihon Chinbotsu	Yamashiro's Son-in-law
2006	The Catch Man	Actor
2007	Welcome to the Quiet Room (Quiet room ni yôkoso)	Doctor
2010	Death Kappa	Actor
2013	The Wind Rises	Voice of Jiro Horikoshi, main character
2013	The Kingdom of Dreams and Madness	Self (Documentary film)
2016	Shin Godzilla	Passerby (uncredited)
2020	Last Letter	Sojiro Kishibeno
2022	Shin Ultraman	Ultraman (motion capture; with Bin Furuya)
2023	Ichikei's Crow	Cameo
2026	Godzilla Minus Zero	Train passenger

== Other credits ==
- Royal Space Force: The Wings of Honnêamise (1987) (Special effects & production designer)
- Strings (2004) (Japanese version director)
- Ando-Roid (2013) (Story concept)
- The Dragon Dentist (2017) (Executive producer and sound director)
- Virtual-san Looking (2019) (Creative supervisor)

== Awards and honors ==
Year	Award	Category	Work	Result
1997	The 18th Nihon SF Taisho Award		Neon Genesis Evangelion	Won
1999	The 20th Yokohama Film Festival	Best New Director	Love & Pop	Won
2008	The 6th Tokyo Anime Award	Animation of the Year	Evangelion: 1.0 You Are (Not) Alone	Won
2008	The 6th Tokyo Anime Award	Best director	Evangelion: 1.0 You Are (Not) Alone	Won
2016	The 41st Hochi Film Award	Best Director	Shin Godzilla	Nominated
2017	The 71st Mainichi Film Awards	Best Director	Shin Godzilla	Nominated
2017	The 71st Mainichi Film Awards	Best Screenplay	Shin Godzilla	Nominated
2017	The 90th Kinema Junpo Awards	Best Screenplay	Shin Godzilla	Won
2017	The 38th Yokohama Film Festival	Special Grand Prize	Shin Godzilla	Won
2017	The 40th Japan Academy Prize	Director of the Year	Shin Godzilla	Won
2017	The 26th Tokyo Sports Film Award	Best Director	Shin Godzilla	Won

Year	Honor	Ref
2022	Medal with Purple Ribbon	
