= Kazuya Tsurumaki =

Japanese anime director

- 鶴巻 和哉
- Born: February 2, 1966 (age 60); Gosen, Niigata, Japan
- Occupations: Animator, anime creator, director
- Notable work: The End of Evangelion (1997); FLCL (2000); Diebuster (2004); Rebuild of Evangelion (2007-2021); I can Friday by day! (2015); The Dragon Dentist (2017); Mobile Suit Gundam GQuuuuuuX (2025)

Kazuya Tsurumaki (鶴巻 和哉 Tsurumaki Kazuya) is a Japanese anime director. He was born on February 2, 1966, in the city of Gosen, located in Niigata Prefecture.

He is the protégé of Hideaki Anno, and a longtime animator at Gainax. Tsurumaki's first project at Gainax was as an animation director for the 1990 television series Nadia: The Secret of Blue Water; Tsurumaki was also director of the humorous "omake" (extra) sequences that went along with the TV series, and producer of "Nadia Cinema Edition". In 1995, Tsurumaki served as an assistant director under Hideaki Anno in Gainax's landmark series Neon Genesis Evangelion, in which role he handled production, art director and setting assistant for some episodes. In 1997, he directed episode 25', the first half of the cinematic conclusion to the Evangelion series, The End of Evangelion. In 2000, Tsurumaki officially made his debut as a full-fledged director with the six-part OVA series, FLCL. In 2004 he directed the hit sequel to Gunbuster called Aim for the Top 2! or Diebuster. He was a director for the new four feature Evangelion film series, Rebuild of Evangelion. He directed the 2017 anime special The Dragon Dentist. He attended Otakon in 2001 and Anime Expo in 2016. He is series director for the airing Gundam series Mobile Suit Gundam GQuuuuuuX jointly produced by Bandai Namco Filmworks and Studio Khara, which produced the Rebuild of Evangelion film series.
