= Kaworu Nagisa =

Character from Neon Genesis Evangelion

- Neon Genesis Evangelion character
- First appearance: Neon Genesis Evangelion episode 24: "The Beginning and the End, or 'Knockin' on Heaven's Door'" (1996)
- Created by: Gainax
- Voiced by: Japanese: Akira Ishida; English: Kyle Sturdivant (ADV dub; Broadcast); Aaron Krohn (Manga dub of Death & Rebirth and The End of Evangelion); Greg Ayres (ADV dub; Director's Cut); Jerry Jewell (Rebuild series; Funimation dub); Clifford Chapin (Netflix dub); Daman Mills (Rebuild series; Prime Video dub)

In-universe information
- Aliases: Tabris
- Species: Angel
- Gender: Male
- Title: Fifth Child

Kaworu Nagisa (Japanese: 渚 カヲル, Hepburn: Nagisa Kaworu), real name Tabris (タブリス, Taburisu), is a fictional character from the Neon Genesis Evangelion franchise, created by animation studio Gainax. In the original television series, he is the pilot of a giant mecha named Evangelion Unit 02 for the special agency Nerv, as well as the seventeenth and final member of the Angels that threaten humanity and that Nerv is meant to fight. When he arrives at Nerv, he meets Eva-01 pilot Shinji Ikari, showing great affection towards him. After revealing his nature as an Angel to Shinji, he asks him to kill him to allow humanity to survive.

The character, originally conceived by Gainax as a cat controlling a boy, was supposed to appear in the series' twenty-second episode. After several changes, director Hideaki Anno and screenwriter Akio Satsukawa decided on him being the last Angel, and he was included in the twenty-fourth episode, "The Beginning and the End, or "Knockin' on Heaven's Door"". He later re-appears in subsequent works in the franchise, including the Rebuild of Evangelion films, video games, the original net animation Petit Eva: Evangelion@School, and the manga adaptation by Yoshiyuki Sadamoto. His role is notably significantly expanded in Evangelion: 3.0 You Can (Not) Redo, the third film of the Rebuild saga.

Although he only appears in a single episode of the original series, Kaworu significantly alters the narrative, in particular Shinji's character, and proved popular with audiences and animation enthusiasts, topping popularity polls. An ambiguous character by design, Kaworu's nature both narratively and thematically has been widely debated, and he polarized critics, with some disliking his ambiguity and the romantic undertones of his relationship with Shinji, while others praised his personality, finding him to be open, affectionate, and sociable. His prominent role in Evangelion 3.0 also attracted attention, with reviewers generally appreciating his relationship with Shinji. Merchandise based on Kaworu has been released, particularly action figures.

== Conception ==
Kaworu was originally conceived as a cat-like Angel who possesses a boy.

Akio Satsukawa, a screenwriter who contributed to writing for the series' twenty-fourth episode, "The Beginning and the End, or "Knockin' on Heaven's Door"", chose Kaworu's name. The production staff asked him to use something related to water or the sea. He opted for the surname Nagisa (Japanese for "shore") as a homage to Japanese director Nagisa Ōshima. The choice of a term related to the sea allowed him to connect to the names of other series' characters inspired by Imperial Japanese Navy ships and nami (波; lit. "wave") in the surname of Rei Ayanami. The name Kaworu was not written with the contemporary spelling カオル (Kaoru) with the katakana オ (o), but with the archaic character ヲ (wo). The kanji nagisa (渚) was chosen for its connection with the katakana shi (シ) and the kanji sha (者), a detail referring to the Japanese title of the episode: "The Final Messenger" (最後のシ者, Saigo no shisha). Satsukawa then created a pun with the phoneme shisha, which can mean "messenger" (使者) or "dead" (死者). Writer Alexandre Marine interpreted Kaworu's name as a possible reference to Kaoru Orihara, also known as Kaoru-no-kimi ("Prince Kaoru"), the androgynous girl from Dear Brother by Osamu Dezaki. Marine also connected the archaic spelling Kaworu with Kaoru (薫), a character from Murasaki Shikibu's The Tale of Genji. Critic Ryōta Fujitsu noted that Kaworu's name is gender-neutral, linking the choice to the androgynous portrayal of Satan in Devilman. The series' director Hideaki Anno reiterated in an interview that he instead associated the name with Kaworu's role as an ideal boy and an idealized version of Shinji, arguing that "there's no feminine sense whatsoever".

The staff had already planned to introduce Kaworu Nagisa during the earliest stages of development. Two years before the series began broadcasting, Gainax published a presentation about the series entitled New Century Evangelion (tentative name) Proposal (新世紀エヴァンゲリオン (仮) 企画書, Shinseiki Evangelion (kari) kikakusho). Kaworu was originally going to appear in the twenty-second episode of the series, "The Cat and the Transfer Student" (猫と転校生, Neko to tenkōsei), as a "bishōnen constantly accompanied by a cat". Nerv would have allowed the boy to enter its laboratories and, after a clash in which his fellow pilot Shinji Ikari found himself "in the dilemma of having to fight against an anthropomorphic enemy", "the greatest secret of the organization" would be revealed. In the first drafts, the Angel would have been a cat controlling a boy; however, this idea was abandoned, and elements of it were merged into Kaworu. In preliminary proposals, he had an organ characteristic of Angels named core and the ability to modify his appearance through metamorphosis. Sadamoto identified the Return of Ultraman episode "The Monster Tamer and the Boy" as a possible source of inspiration, since it features a lonely, ostracized boy named Ryō who shares a connection with a monster called Muruchi. The Angel was also originally intended to attend Tokyo-3 school alongside the other main characters, but Anno later discarded the idea as the story had by then moved beyond its original school-based premise. To avoid drawing complex scenes of the cat walking alongside him, the staff instead planned for Kaworu to carry it under his arm. Other proposals envisioned the Angel as the boy himself, while others portrayed it as a shapeshifter capable of assuming the form of either the boy or the cat, like a bakeneko, a shape-shifting cat yōkai from Japanese folklore. The staff ultimately abandoned the concept for practical reasons, since animating the cat would still have proved difficult. They also felt that the idea of a cat Angel manipulating a human puppet too closely resembled earlier works, like the movie The Day the Earth Stood Still (1951).

In the sixteenth episode, "Splitting of the Breast", the Angel Leliel comes into contact with Shinji Ikari. In the original screenplay, after experimenting with various human voices and languages, Leliel would ultimately have chosen Japanese to communicate with Shinji. Because Anno had already planned to introduce a human-looking enemy in the form of Kaworu, however, he revised the script so that Kaworu, rather than Leliel, became the first Angel to speak a human language. In the broadcast version, Kaworu speaks almost exclusively with Shinji and has only a brief exchange with Rei, as Anno felt there was no need for him to interact with the other characters. He later decided, however, to add a scene between Kaworu and Misato Katsuragi in the home video extended version. In an interview conducted before the release of the home video version, Anno said that he could not imagine what such a scene would even look like. Sadamoto recalled that Evangelion scripts were generally written with enough material for roughly two episodes before Anno condensed them, and believed that several scenes involving Kaworu were consequently discarded. Additional suggestions came from Mitsuo Iso, who previously wrote the thirteenth episode, "Lilliputian Hitcher". Iso's proposal introduced Eva-05, described as an Evangelion of roughly human size. Like the Kikakusho document, Iso's draft portrayed Kaworu as a cat Angel; in Iso's idea, Kaworu was able to attack through psychokinesis and a dynamo, the astrophysical mechanism by which a celestial body generates an electromagnetic field. The cat would have attacked Toji Suzuhara and Kensuke Aida before being pursued by a female Terminator and a male Terminator who fought using ninja-like techniques. Kaworu would then have spoken with Rei while standing atop a utility pole in a scene inspired by Kenji Miyazawa's Kaze no Matasaburo. The episode's overall surreal atmosphere would also have recalled Nazo no Tenkōsei (なぞの転校生; lit. 'Mysterious Transfer Student') by Taku Mayumura. Iso further proposed introducing rainbows as a religious symbol in the episode, reflecting their longstanding association with the covenant between God and humanity; the rainbow religious symbolism was ultimately incorporated into the fifth episode of the series, "Rei I".

Anno conceived him as an idealized version of Shinji, someone everyone would fall in love with. Like other characters in the series, Anno conceived Kaworu based on his own personality. He described Rei and Kaworu as part of his unconscious, and Kaworu specifically as his shadow—the dark and unconscious side of the psyche. According to him, "The plan was that the 'unconscious Shinji' would be Ayanami Rei, the Shinji who appears on the surface would be Ikari Shinji, and the 'ideal Shinji' would be Nagisa Kaworu". The series' staff also described Kaworu as an embodiment of Anno's "death wish". Character designer Yoshiyuki Sadamoto conceived him as "more elegant and more refined" than Shinji, and compared to him he would be "taller, thinner and with a smaller face". For the somatic features of his face, he decided to combine those of Rei, Shinji, and Asuka Langley Soryu, and took inspiration from the boys of the Japanese idol company Johnny's Jr., known for their youthful, androgynous facial features. Sadamoto himself had the opportunity to meet several members of Johnny's Jr. backstage. While designing him, Sadamoto envisioned him with a "younger" voice than in the final version. One of the drafts of the twenty-fourth episode described him as a blond-haired boy, but during production staff decided to change his hair colour to white. Following a personal request from the director, colorist Harumi Takaboshi made his eyes red to be analogous with Rei's and give him "a distinct impression". Although he was conceived to appear only in the final episodes, during the making of the opening theme the main staff decided to depict him with a sketch by Sadamoto; in the editing phase, the sketch was inserted before a frame depicting Rei Ayanami and the caption "Angels". Kaworu's role remained largely unchanged in the final version of the series since then. According to Sadamoto, however, Kaworu was not originally meant to be the last Angel. Instead, the staff simply envisioned that, after presenting Angels with widely different forms and abilities, one of them would eventually assume a human appearance.

=== Development ===
Hideaki Anno entrusted the screenplay for the episode to Akio Satsukawa. As with the rest of the series, Anno provided only a general outline of the plot, which Satsukawa then developed into a draft for Anno and the rest of the staff to review. In Satsukawa's early drafts, Kaworu served as the pilot of a new miniature Evangelion called αーTypeーEva000. His beauty immediately attracted Shinji's attention, prompting rumors among their classmates that the two were dating. In another scene from the draft, Kaworu would have played the piano. Satsukawa also envisioned Kaworu and Shinji swimming naked in a river at night, talking about one day playing the cello and piano together, and kissing each other on the lips. Although Satsukawa's screenplay contained strong homoerotic overtones, Anno did not discourage his colleague from pursuing the idea. Anno ultimately considered the drafts to have exceeded his tolerance level, however, and revised them while preserving their overall atmosphere. The Evangelion staff rejected several elements of the original screenplay. Satsukawa's original river scene carried much stronger erotic overtones than the final version and resembled scenes from films starring River Phoenix. Episode director Masayuki even threatened to leave the production after reading Satsukawa's homoerotic script. The series' producer also rejected the river scene, prompting Anno to replace it with the sequence in which Shinji and Kaworu relax together in Nerv's communal baths. According to Yoshiyuki Sadamoto, Anno developed Satsukawa's image of the two boys in the river in his own way, lending the scene in Nerv's public baths what he described as "a decadent" atmosphere.

In interviews, Anno said that he wrote the dialogue for the bath scene naturally, without reading yaoi works or drawing on personal experience, since he had never experienced anything similar himself. Similar bathing scenes recur throughout his works, including Gunbuster, Nadia: The Secret of Blue Water, and Evangelion itself. Anno himself compared bathing to a return to the maternal womb and linked the Nerv bath sequence to the spontaneous homosocial interactions common among boys in rural Japan, who often gather in public baths after school without physical contact. During the scene, Kaworu also holds Shinji's hand. According to Masayuki, Anno's original storyboard only had Kaworu lightly touch it, but the animators misinterpreted the instructions and made the gesture more intimate. Because of the episode's rushed production schedule, Masayuki chose not to correct the scene. Rumors also suggested that Anno modeled Kaworu after his friend Kunihiko Ikuhara, director of the Sailor Moon anime series. In an interview, Ikuhara denied the rumors, comparing Kaworu's cynical personality to Anno himself, while stating he was not involved in the creation of the character. He also said he had close correspondence with Anno, with whom he was on good terms since the early design stages of Neon Genesis Evangelion. During the production of Sailor Moon, the staff went on a trip to the spa, and Ikuhara chatted all night with Anno, who also worked as an animator for some of the series' episodes. When watching the episode, Ikuhara noticed how the situation with the bath was the same as the conversation he had with Anno.

=== Voice ===
Akira Ishida voices Kaworu Nagisa in his appearance in the original series, as well as the later films, spin-offs, video games, and the Rebuild of Evangelion saga. Before Evangelion, Ishida voiced several notable characters, including Fish Eye, a sexually ambiguous character from Sailor Moon. Ishida obtained the role without a dedicated audition, and the production gave him little explanation of Kaworu's character. Anno himself said that he gave Akira Ishida very little direction, asking only for a gentler tone. Ishida said that he struggled to understand Evangelion, he nevertheless found himself empathizing with Shinji in much the same way he had while reading No Longer Human by Osamu Dazai. Although he had to portray a character who speaks with "self-assured words", a "navigator for delving into the labyrinth of Evangelion", Ishida said that he nevertheless experienced a sense of anguish voicing his character, wondering about the meaning of Kaworu's character. After only a few takes, Ishida fully captured the character, impressing Anno despite having neither seen the series nor been able to watch the animation during the recording sessions. In another interview, Anno admitted that he stopped understanding Kaworu's character while making the episode, describing him as "a strange guy". Ishida's performance, however, led him to reassess the character, ultimately convincing him that the voice actor's interpretation surpassed the image he had originally envisioned.

Akira Ishida once again portrayed the calm and intelligent young man with Kaworu, a type of character he had frequently played before Evangelion. The home video version also brought the cast back to rerecord their scenes. In the conversation between Kaworu and Rei, for example, the revised version adopts a generally slower pace, while Ishida's performance gives Kaworu a slightly more theatrical delivery than the restrained television broadcast. Because some time had passed between the television broadcast and the extended version, Ishida found it difficult to reproduce the same vocal tone. The staff themselves pointed out the difference, leaving him anxious about how fans might react. Uncertain about Kaworu's role in the story, he approached the first recording with considerable nervousness for the broadcast version, choosing to perform the character naturally while conveying an air of mystery. By the time he rerecorded the role for the extended version, however, he felt much more at ease, later remarking that his performance in the original television broadcast had largely come about by chance. Ishida also recalled that he didn't consciously approach the public bath scene between Kaworu and Shinji as a yaoi sequence. Ishida nevertheless reprised the role shortly after the television broadcast for an audio drama named After the End and included on the album Neon Genesis Evangelion Addition (1996). On that occasion, he deliberately adopted what he described as a more yaoi-like vocal delivery, but the performance met with a negative response from fans, leading him to conclude that he had taken the wrong approach.

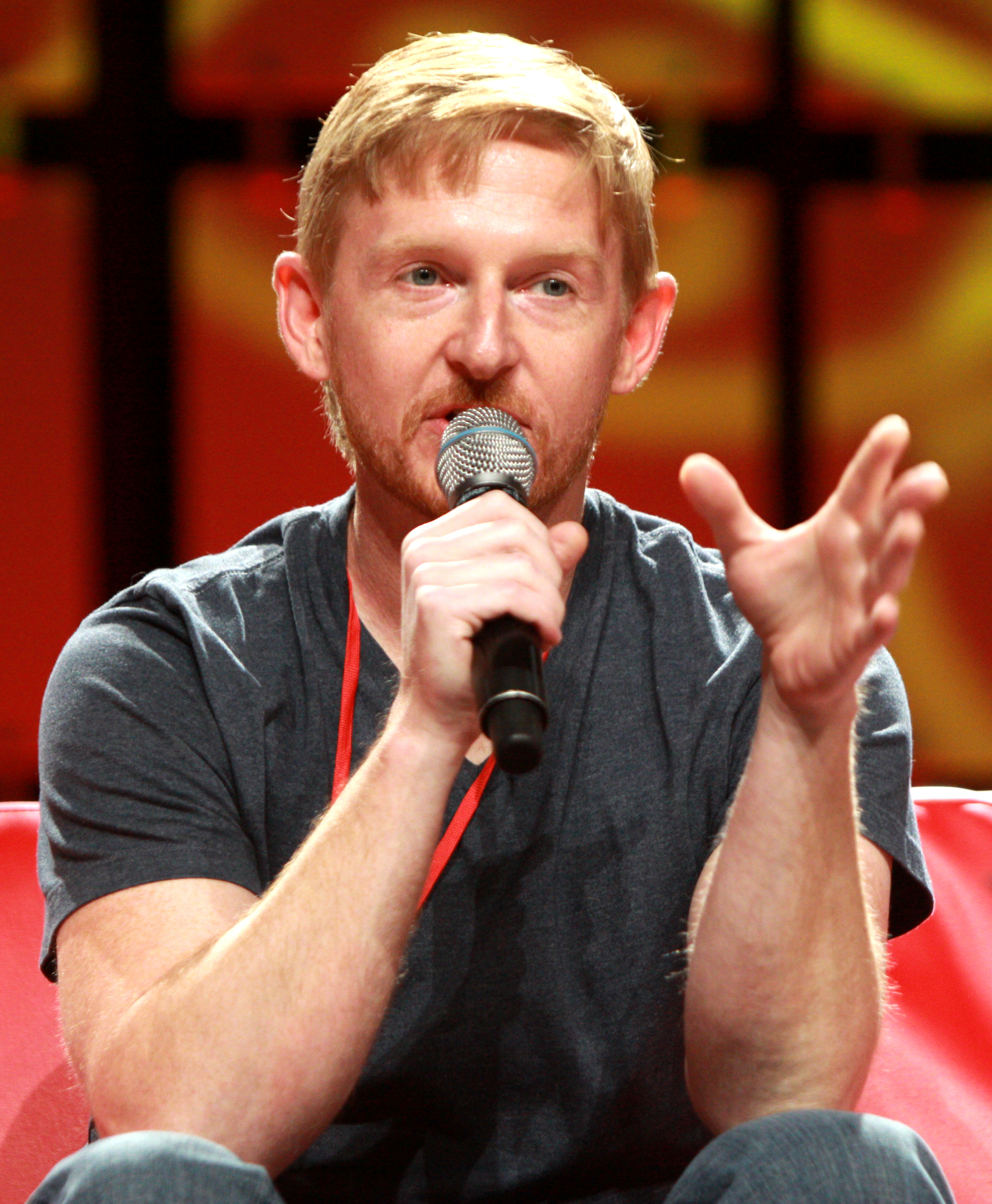
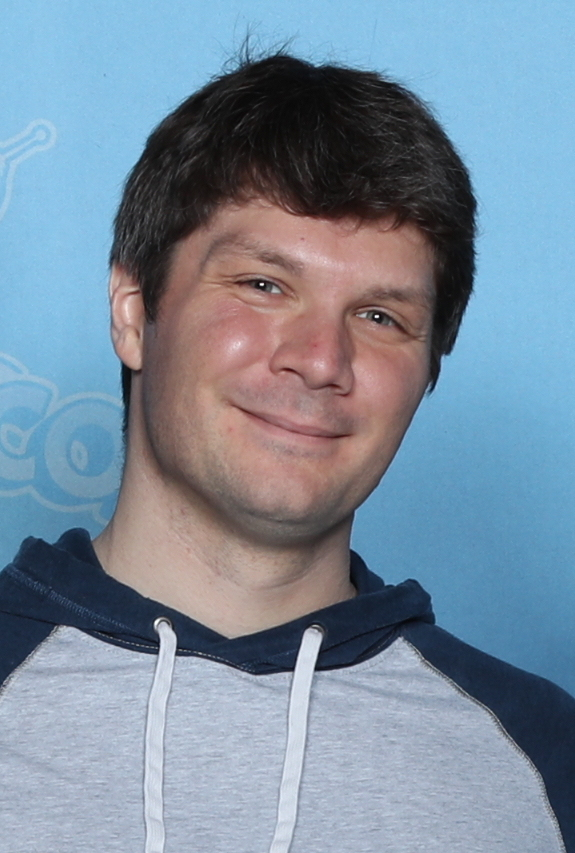
Jerry Jewell (left) and Clifford Chapin (right) voiced Kaworu for the Rebuild of Evangelion saga and the Netflix series' dub, respectively.

In 1997, when The End of Evangelion was released, Ishida said he found the role "very difficult", and felt "a lot of pressure" during the dubbing of the film version. His emotional tension grew exponentially when he learned that there would be two feature movies, but he was satisfied with his performance. During the recording of Evangelion: 1.0 You Are (Not) Alone (2007), the first chapter of the Rebuild of Evangelion cinematic tetralogy, Anno explained in detail the role played by Kaworu in the new theatrical version and his relationship with Shinji. During the dubbing sessions for Evangelion: 3.0 You Can (Not) Redo (2012) he felt tense, but with the director's support, he overcame his performance anxiety and reprised the role. For the final installment, Evangelion: 3.0+1.0 Thrice Upon a Time, Ishida similarly noted he had trouble saying the character's "complex" lines.

In English, he is voiced by Kyle Sturdivant in the original series; Greg Ayres in the director's cut version, Aaron Krohn in the 1997 film duology, Clifford Chapin in the Netflix' dub, Jerry Jewell in the first dub of Rebuild of Evangelion and Daman Mills in the Amazon Prime Video's dub.

==== Netflix's dub ====
In the Netflix dub, one of Kaworu's lines to Shinji was changed from A.D. Vision DVD's "I love you" to "I like you". Kaworu also describes Shinji as "worthy of love" in ADV Films' English dub, while Netflix's version translates the line as "worthy of grace". This was a controversial choice among some fans, who felt it altered their relationship and contributed to queer erasure. Anime scholar Jonathan Clements noted that ADV’s subtitles also used the term "like", making the censorship hypothesis unlikely. He further argued that "both terms carry a certain ambiguity". Dan Kanemitsu, studio Khara's in-house translator responsible for the updated Evangelion subtitles, production assistance, and other official Gainax and Khara translations, including the Rebuild of Evangelion films, explained in an interview that he consults the original creator when the meaning is unclear or ambiguous. He defended the importance of ambiguity, citing Anno's commentaries on Evangelion's ambiguity and open-endedness, his commitment to accuracy, and conveying the text's intended nuances across a cultural gap.

Shinji's voice actress, Megumi Ogata, agreed with Kanemitsu's translation for the Netflix release, saying she originally interpreted Kaworu's lines as "like", and that she is glad the new version is closer to the original Japanese version. Ogata also rejected the notion of Kaworu as his lover, or that he is someone he can depend on, but instead sees him as a friend that is his equal. She pointed out that Shinji is more clingy in the original series, while in the Rebuild saga he has a more active role and his relationship with Kaworu is consequently different: "I feel like, this time, it's more than his attraction to Kaworu or what he learns from him – they're depicted more as friends gradually closing the distance between each other".

== Appearances ==
=== Neon Genesis Evangelion ===
Kaworu appears in the twenty-fourth episode of Neon Genesis Evangelion. A secret sect called Seele and a group called the Human Instrumentality Committee sent him to the headquarters of the special agency Nerv to carry out a mission as the Fifth Child and the replacement for Asuka Langley Soryu, who became unable to pilot giant mecha Eva-02 following a mental breakdown. Soon after arriving in Tokyo-3, he meets with Shinji Ikari, who is the Third Child and Eva-01's pilot. He befriends him, showing unconditional and sincere sympathy towards him. His position as a pilot allows him to enter Nerv, but Misato Katsuragi, a major in the organization's operations department, becomes suspicious of him. He is subjected to a synchronicity test with Eva-02, and his high results astound the organization's staff, since he can arbitrarily vary his rate of synchronization with the mecha. All data about his past is erased to conceal his true identity, but Misato discovers that he was born on September 13, 2000: the day the first of the Angels caused a calamity called the Second Impact to occur at the South Pole. He is revealed to be Tabris, the seventeenth of a series of enemies of humankind named Angels and the "last messenger", who has the soul of the first Angel, Adam, implanted in him. Seele, who captured Tabris when he was still in an embryonic state, "recovered" it. Unlike the other Angels, he can develop human-like feelings and communicate with them. Once in the headquarters, he comes into contact with Rei Ayanami, the pilot of Eva-00, in which the soul of another Angel is implanted, and confesses to her that he is also a hybrid.

Using his Angel abilities, Kaworu manipulates the movements of Eva-02 to enter the Terminal Dogma of Nerv's headquarters and contact the Angel Adam, who is supposedly being guarded within the structure. Despite his anthropomorphic features, he possesses several anomalous abilities, including levitation and an AT Field, a powerful force field that is characteristic of Angels and Evangelions. Upon arriving at his destination, he discovers that the second Angel, Lilith, is being kept inside the base rather than Adam. Upon seeing Lilith, he interrupts his attempt at contact and decides to preserve her lineage, which humankind is descended from, rather than cause their extinction. He allows himself to be killed by Eva-01 and Shinji to allow humanity to survive. In the ending film of the series, Neon Genesis Evangelion: The End of Evangelion (1997), the souls of humanity unite into a collective consciousness, and during a process called Human Instrumentality, Shinji argues symbolically with Kaworu and Rei Ayanami. His Japanese voice actor, Akira Ishida, said that the Kaworu who appears in The End of Evangelion is not real or concretely present; in the film, he and Rei say they represent the "hope that people will one day be able to understand each other". He also appears in Gendo Ikari's death scene, along with Rei and Shinji's mother, Yui Ikari.

=== Rebuild of Evangelion ===
In the Rebuild of Evangelion saga, Kaworu has a prominent role and he is aware of details of Shinji's life even before meeting him. He is introduced in the final sequence of the first film, Evangelion: 1.0 You Are (Not) Alone (2007), in which he awakens on the surface of the Moon to converse with a member of Seele. During the scene, he rises from a coffin placed on a lunar sea, with eight coffins next to him: four already open and four still closed. Behind him, a white giant is framed, similar to the Angel Lilith. He is completely naked, and somehow can breathe on the Moon. He addresses Commander Gendo Ikari, who is visiting a place named Tabgha Base, as "father". In Evangelion: 2.0 You Can (Not) Advance (2009), the second installment of the saga, when Shinji tries to save Rei and unwittingly starts Third Impact, he descends aboard an Evangelion unit known as Mark.06. He stops the Third Impact, addressing Shinji with the phrase: "At least this time I will be able to make you happy." Originally, Kaworu would have said the line with the light-hearted smile of the original series; however, during production it was decided to give him a troubled expression. Kazuya Tsurumaki, the assistant director of the original series and its movies, described him as a man who takes his wife back by force. He also said: "[We thought it would be] more interesting if Kaworu looked like [he was thinking]: 'You've been with a woman while I've been away? How dare you...!'". Staff initially wanted to give him a "showier entrance", and originally give him a scene talking to Asuka when Eva 03 is possessed by the ninth Angel.

In the third movie, Evangelion: 3.0 You Can (Not) Redo (2012), set fourteen years after the previous film, he works for Nerv and is designated to pilot Eva-13 with Shinji on behalf of Gendo, whom he calls "king of Lilin". He shows Shinji, who is alone and scared of the new world, the consequences of his actions on planet Earth. Shinji is initially reluctant, but Kaworu offers him an opportunity to reverse the damage done by Third Impact. To train, the two boys practice piano on the same a quatre mains musical base. Having reached good harmony, the two board Eva-13 and head to the Terminal Dogma of the Nerv base. Asuka and Mari Makinami confront them, but Kaworu falls for a trap set by Gendo and accidentally causes Shinji to start the Fourth Impact. He reveals he is the first Angel, but was demoted to thirteenth, and dies telling Shinji that "We will meet again." In the final movie, Evangelion: 3.0+1.0 Thrice Upon a Time, Kaworu appears as a vision to Shinji during Instrumentality and reveals that he has repeatedly met him through a cycle of death and rebirth, since he wrote Shinji's name in a "Book of Life". In one scene set on the shores of Lake Ashino, a young Shinji asks Kaworu if he would like to become his friend. Afterward, Kaworu reflects with Kaji on the inescapability of his fate and his inability to die. Ryoji Kaji points out that Kaworu had sought his own happiness through Shinji rather than Shinji's. After Shinji breaks the cycle, Kaworu thanks Kaji—who addresses him as "Commander Nagisa"—for saving him. In the film's ending scene, he appears as an adult in the rebuilt world alongside Rei in Ube Station.

Akira Ishida, Kaworu's voice actor, was asked if the sequence of Shinji and Kaworu united in the same Evangelion could be interpreted as a "love scene"; Ishida replied he "could not make that interpretation", and left it up to what the director said or the fans' speculation, saying: "But, at the very least, them getting in the same unit is different, as they both pursue the same goal together. It seems representative of the depth of their connection". According to Yoshiyuki Sadamoto, Kaworu's redesigned appearance in the Rebuild of Evangelion films more closely resembles his manga incarnation than his anime counterpart. Sadamoto also incorporated elements reminiscent of Chiaki Mamiya from The Girl Who Leapt Through Time (2006), for which he served as character designer. Before the release of the final Rebuild of Evangelion film, fans widely discussed a hypothesis commonly known as the "loop theory", according to which the tetralogy serves as a sequel to the original anime. The theory holds that the characters repeatedly relive the events of the television series with minor variations. Mario Pasqualini of Dimensione Fumetto, however, rejected this interpretation, arguing that only Kaworu is trapped in a cycle of death and rebirth, whereas Shinji and the other characters progress linearly and several lines of dialogue contradict the fan theory.

=== Manga ===
In the Neon Genesis Evangelion manga, written by the series' character designer Yoshiyuki Sadamoto, Kaworu is introduced in advance in a narrative arc roughly corresponding to the nineteenth episode of the series, "Introjection". In the 57th chapter of the comic, he meets Shinji in the ruins of a church during a piano solo. In his first appearance, he kills a stray cat in front of Shinji, arguing this would spare the cat further pain. He is later brought into Nerv to replace the Fourth Child, Toji, who died while fighting alongside Rei Ayanami against the Angel Armisael. His role as an Angel also changes, being presented as the twelfth instead of the seventeenth. Writer Virginie Nebbia noted that Kaworu's manga incarnation is less human and less sympathetic than his anime counterpart. In this version of events, Shinji has strong suspicions of the Fifth Child, and he accuses Kaworu of violating his personal space. Following Rei's death, Shinji temporarily moves to his apartment, heartbroken by the loss he has just suffered. Shinji has a nightmare and starts to hyperventilate, and Kaworu uses this opportunity to perform cardiopulmonary resuscitation by kissing Shinji, which angers him. Over time, their relationship becomes increasingly cold and tormented, until they take two different paths.

Unlike the original series, in which their relationship is ambiguous and up to speculation, for the manga Sadamoto changed Kaworu's characterization, leaving less margin for interpretation. According to him, Kaworu feels "a reflection of Rei's feelings" for Shinji, but he fails to understand them. Irritated by his behavior, after killing Kaworu, Shinji admits he felt "drawn to him", but in the end rejects him "because he is not Rei". Sadamoto adapted the public bath scene into a shower for the manga. He also decided to begin and end Kaworu's story with the cat subplot, concluding it with Kaworu asking Shinji to kill him as a demonstration of his love. Before his death, the Third Child imagines himself strangling Kaworu at the same time and place he met him. For this scene, the author took inspiration from the film Betty Blue, directed by Jean-Jacques Beineix, which tells the tormented story of two young lovers in which he ultimately strangles her out of love. Sadamoto created Kaworu to represent "a situation in which Shinji has to confront liking someone"; according to him, he is the person who understands Shinji the most. In an interview, Sadamoto compared his death to a "contradictory fumi-e", an ancient Japanese ritual consisting of the trampling of Christian icons, in which Tabris would ask Shinji to prove he liked him by killing him. According to Sadamoto, in this particular moment of his life Shinji does not want the affection of a girl, but the approval of another boy. Unlike Anno, who wanted to give Kaworu the image of an "ideal man", Sadamoto, who believes that human beings are the last evolutionary stage of Angels, tried to represent him as a "pre-human", innocent and naive character. He was inspired by his own experiences, particularly by a classmate in elementary school who was a charming transfer student from Tokyo whom he felt great admiration for. He said that, "I secretly thought it was very cool. It was not romance ... It is a delicate feeling in a delicate age".

=== In other media ===
After the conclusion of Neon Genesis Evangelion's first airing, a self-parody audio track written by Anno called After the End was released. On it the series' characters, played by their original voice actors, jokingly discuss and prepare a new ending just before the production schedule deadline, breaking the fourth wall. Kaworu appears; when Asuka calls him "homoboy", he tells her, "I wish you wouldn't make statements when you lack evidence for them". Nagisa, along with Eva's other pilots, joins a super sentai-style superhero group named Shin sentai Evangelion. In the movie Neon Genesis Evangelion: Death and Rebirth (1997) there are sequences in which four children from the third middle school of the city of Tokyo-2, with their respective instruments, practice a string quartet in the school's auditorium. Among them is a violinist who looks like Kaworu; according to what is indicated by the superimposed writings, however, the event would take place eighteen months before his appearance in Tokyo-3. From the script, it is clear that, despite the similarity with the protagonists of the series, the four children should still be interpreted as actors in an imaginary sequence. Animedia magazine also noted that Kaworu briefly appears in the eyes of the first Rei clone during her death scene.

He appears in video games dedicated to Neon Genesis Evangelion and is available as a romantic option in Neon Genesis Evangelion: Girlfriend of Steel 2nd, Neon Genesis Evangelion 2, and Neon Genesis Evangelion: Shinji Ikari Raising Project. He is also present in the Raising Project manga adaptation as an agent sent by Seele at Ritsuko's behest. In the manga Neon Genesis Evangelion: Angelic Days he knows Shinji's father, Gendo, years before the main events without having changed his appearance. In the chibi parody series Petit Eva: Evangelion@School Kaworu is president of the school student council particularly popular among the students at his school who tends to protect Shinji, whom he loves. In the manga Evangelion – Detective Shinji Ikari, written by Takumi Yoshimura, Ryoji Kaji and Kaworu are portrayed as two private investigators to whom Shinji is forced to turn. In Neon Genesis Evangelion: Campus Apocalypse, his personality is similar to that of the original series. At the beginning of the manga, Kaworu is seen by Shinji near a vending machine running away from the scene of an explosion with Rei Ayanami, with whom he has an unspecified bond. Like the original series, he immediately shows great interest in Shinji, making him uncomfortable. He is also present in Neon Genesis Evangelion: Legend of the Piko Piko Middle School Students. Kaworu is one of the main characters of a pachinko entitled CR Shinseiki Evangelion: Saigo no shisha (ＣＲ新世紀エヴァンゲリオン ～最後のシ者～, "CR Neon Genesis Evangelion: The Last Messenger"), released in Japan in April 2009. During the game, Nagisa intervenes during Operation Yashima against Ramiel with his Eva-04.

In addition to video games based on the original animated series, Kaworu has also appeared in media not related to the Evangelion franchise, such as Million Arthur, Hortensia Saga, Keri hime sweets, Summons Board, Divine Gate, Monster Strike, Final Gear, Puzzle & Dragons, Puyopuyo!! Quest, and The Battle Cats. Kaworu briefly assists Shinji in Neon Genesis Evangelion: Anima; Anima also features a "Dark Kaworu" who hates humans and music. He is also present in the crossover franchise Super Robot Wars.

== Characterization and themes ==
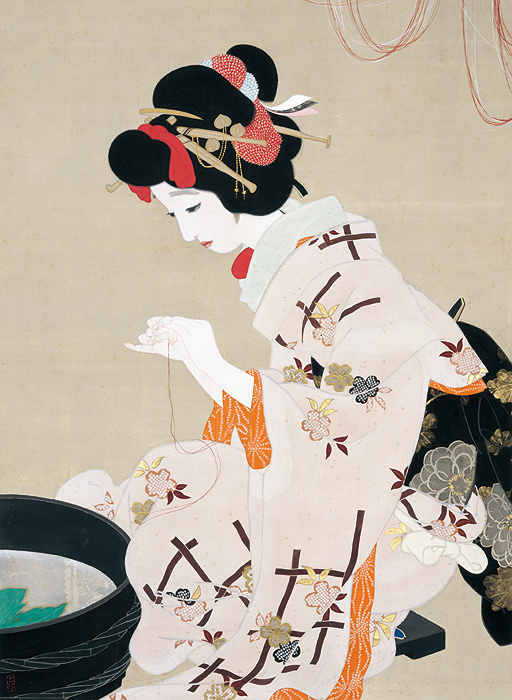
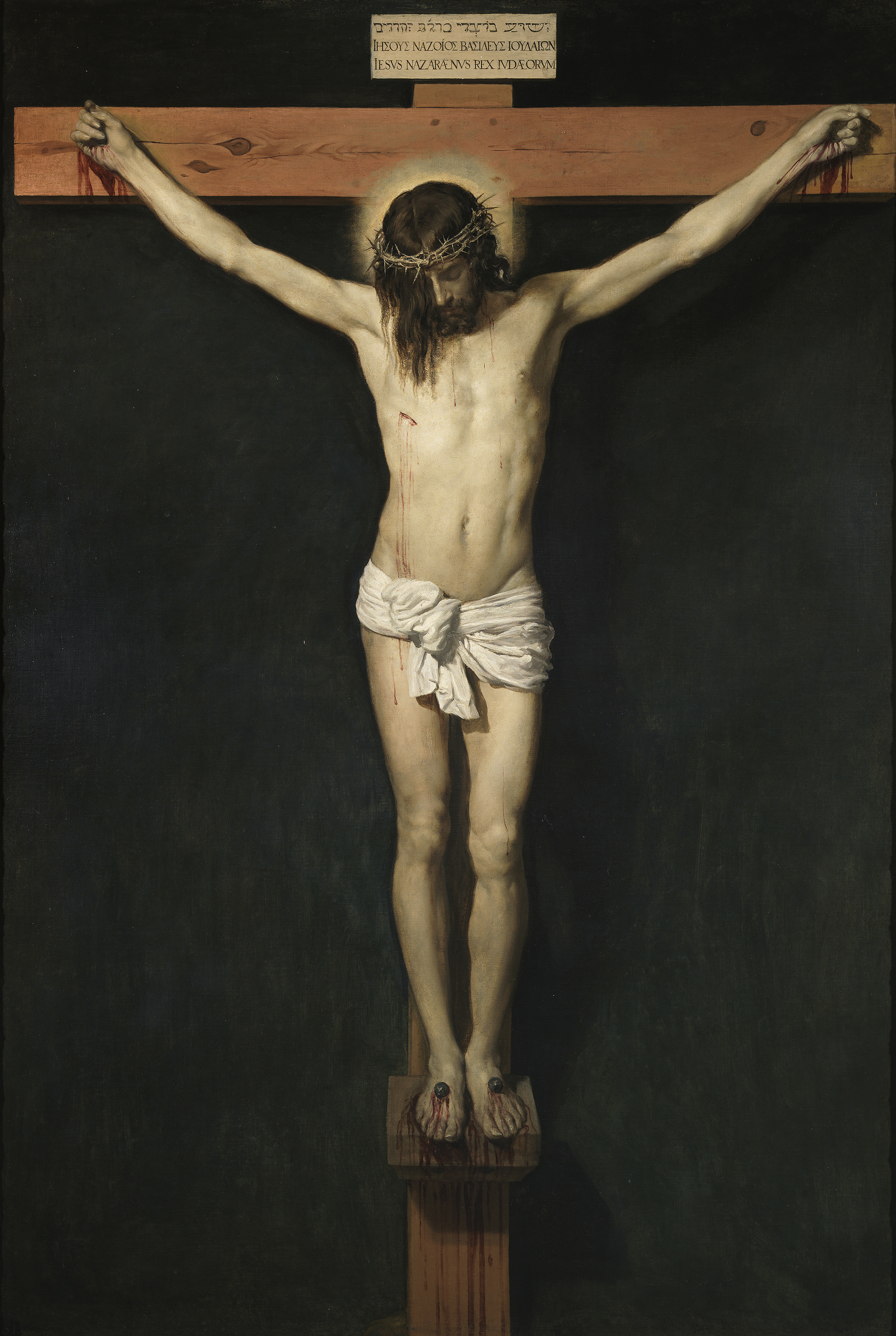
Misato and Rei's voice actresses described Kaworu as Shinji's Orihime, a mythological weaver, lover of the cowherd Hikoboshi. Critics also compared him to Jesus Christ, since he sacrifices himself for humanity's sake.

Kaworu is an erudite boy with an easy-going, straightforward and honest personality, particularly with Shinji Ikari. From the beginning, he shows great interest in Shinji, who is the first person he meets after arriving in Tokyo-3. Following the death, departure, or alienation of all his peers, Shinji is isolated until he meets Kaworu. However, Kaworu's esoteric way of communicating confounds Shinji. Kaworu also shows great interest in humanity, describing their music, particularly the "Ode to Joy", as the highest achievement of their culture, and often reflects on their fragility and nature. He is very direct in his interactions and seemingly does not know of or is interested in social conventions. He shows sympathy for Rei, who shares his hybrid nature. Kaworu seeks active contact with Shinji as a friend. Talking with Shinji, Kaworu says he thinks that he was "born to meet him". Although Shinji emotionally distances himself from others, Kaworu helps him to open up and express his feelings. After they meet, Shinji accepts the friendly and unreserved nature of his actions and lets him approach. He captivates Shinji with his charm. Despite the short time they spend together, Kaworu and Shinji become interested in each other and build a relationship based upon mutual appreciation. Kaworu is the first person to tell Shinji he loves him and the first person that Shinji opens his heart to. Shortly before dying, Kaworu maintains his feelings of affection for Shinji, saying that meeting him made him happy. After being forced to kill Kaworu, Shinji falls back into a state of profound affliction. Misato tries to comfort Shinji, but her words fail to ease his grief.

In Apollonius of Tyana's Nuctemeron, Tabris is the Angel of free will and freedom. In Neon Genesis Evangelion, connecting to the Judeo-Christian tradition, Tabris chooses to be killed by Shinji, finding absolute freedom in death. Apollonius' Nuctemeron also mentions a demon named Cahor, spelled in Japanese as Kahoru (カホル), referred to as the Angel of lies and deceit, a detail that the guidebook Evangelion Chronicle relates to his deceptive anthropomorphic features. Writer Aaron Ploof compared Kaworu to Jesus Christ for his compassionate character and his sacrifice. Scholar Gavin McDowell further argued that Kaworu's revelation that he carries Adam's soul echoes Paul the Apostle's theology, which presents Christ as the new Adam. In one scene from The End of Evangelion, Kaworu and Rei also identify themselves with hope and the words "I love you", while Shinji describes them as "a prayer"; writer Jake Potter interpreted the dialogue as an allusion to the three theological virtues of Christianity: hope, faith, and charity. Psychologist Yasufumi Nakoshi instead compared Kaworu, an Angel incarnated in human form, to a recurring motif in Hindu mythology, in which deities assume human bodies, such as Krishna, an incarnation of Vishnu. Writer Tetra Tanizaki likewise likened Kaworu's role to that of the Christian guardian angel. Conversely, Carl Horn, editor of the Evangelion manga in English, compared his comic version to the character of Satan in Mark Twain's novella The Mysterious Stranger, for acting with indifference to human morality, while French website Du9 likened the image of Kaworu killed by Eva-01 to Francisco Goya's Saturn Devouring His Son. Wired also speculated that Kaworu is inspired by Satan, also known as Ryo Asuka, the main antagonist of Gō Nagai's Devilman. According to Yūichirō Oguro, who curated contents of the home video editions of Neon Genesis Evangelion, he presents affinities with Lalah Sune, a female character from the Mobile Suit Gundam franchise. For Oguro, their relationship with the story's male protagonist traces an analogy between the characters: both appear in the last episodes of the series and seem to be able to understand the feelings of the male main character, dying by his own hand.

Writer Virginie Nebbia compared Kaworu's sociable personality to that of Perolynga and Metron, two monsters from Ultraseven. She linked the comparison to Akio Jissōji, a director who greatly influenced Anno and with whom Satsukawa collaborated on A Watcher in the Attic (1994). Perolynga in particular appears as a friendly monster whom the protagonists nevertheless kill at the end of the episode, despite its closing scenes suggesting that human beings are bad. Nebbia also noted that Jan, one of the protagonists of Childhood's End by Arthur C. Clarke, plays the piano on an Earth devoid of humanity much like Kaworu in the first drafts. She further compared Kaworu's angel-shaped statue to the cover illustration of Shitsurakuen (失楽園; lit. 'Paradise Lost') by Daijirō Morohoshi, which depicts the statue of an accusing angel precariously balanced above a vast expanse of water. Critic and writer Ryōta Fujitsu likened Kaworu's angelic statue to a gargoyle or a fallen angel. Reviewer Toji Aida compared Kaworu to a ghost of the Noh theatre who disrupts the events of the story in the tripartite Jo-ha-kyū structure of the Rebuild series. Los Angeles Times's Inkoo Kang also saw in his dialogues with Shinji, in which he tells him that all sins can be expiated, a reference to Christianity. Furthermore, in the Rebuild saga, Kaworu claims that his name is written on the Book of Life (生命の書, seimei no sho), which would allow him to die and be reborn forever; he subsequently added to his name the name of Shinji, thus managing to meet him several times. According to critic Mario Pasqualini and scholar Gavin Mcdowell, the Book of Life cited by Kaworu is a reference to a concept of the same name in Christianity, according to which it is a text in which God would have listed in his hand the people destined to go to Heaven on the Last Judgment. Pasqualini also compared the Rebuild to the science fiction movie Summer Vacation 1999 (1988). The film introduces a character named Kaoru, a new student at a boys' boarding school who has a love affair with fellow student Kazuhiko. Kaoru turns out to be the reincarnation of Yū, a boy who died by suicide shortly before, who was resurrected to try to win Kazuhiko over, change the story, and give him a new ending.

=== Relationship with Shinji ===
Kaworu plays a brief yet pivotal role in Shinji's character arc. Scholar Satoshi Tsukamoto and Protoculture Addicts magazine argued that Shinji sees Kaworu as someone who understands and accepts him. After discovering that Kaworu is in fact an Angel, Shinji feels betrayed by the only person to whom he has opened himself so completely. According to writer Zachary Verber, Shinji consequently faces the dilemma of killing the first person to genuinely accept and love him in the name of duty. Psychologist Yasufumi Nakoshi has further argued that Kaworu can express his feelings for Shinji only by sacrificing himself. Scholar Fabio Bartoli stated that Shinji, by killing Kaworu, destroys the purest part of himself. Kaworu's death ultimately precipitates Shinji's complete psychological collapse in the series finale. Their relationship is depicted in an ambiguously worded manner, as Kaworu uses the word suki (好き) to express his feelings for Shinji, which can indicate various forms of intimacy from friendship to love, and has been variously translated as such in the show's officially licensed translations. Kaworu tells Shinji that his heart is as fragile as glass and that he loves him for that very imperfection. He also states that Shinji deserves koui (好意, sympathy). The official series filmbooks noted that he keeps his hands in his pockets for most of the episode, a gesture commonly associated with concealing something. His interactions with Shinji, however, often reveal his hands openly.

Over time, controversies have arisen over the nature of Shinji and Kaworu's relationship, as has the nature of Kaworu's character. Several scholars, including cultural critic Hiroki Azuma, have argued that Shinji develops a homosexual attraction or curiosity toward Kaworu, or that their relationship remains deliberately ambiguous rather than purely platonic. Kentaro Takekuma, the editor of a book of interviews with Evangelion staff named Parano Evangelion, believes that for Shinji, Kaworu turns out to be the first friend he can trust and a homosexual romantic interest. Scholar Emily Wati Muir likewise described Kaworu as "a friend and a romantic interest" for Shinji. In his book Anime Explosion!, writer Patrick Drazen expresses the view that Kaworu's offer of apparent love for Shinji is a tactic that he uses as the last Angel to disarm Shinji. Drazen reports that some believe that whether Kaworu as an Angel has any concept of sexuality is unclear because of the way he is presented in the series. Official encyclopedia Evangelion Chronicle affirms that Kaworu shows he feels spontaneous sympathy and sincere affection towards Shinji despite his goals as the seventeenth Angel. Writers Vrai Kaiser and Isaac Lizzie of Anime Feminist likewise interpreted Kaworu's interactions with Shinji as a sincere expression of love. Kotono Mitsuishi and Megumi Hayashibara, Japanese voice actresses of Misato Katsuragi and Rei Ayanami, compared the two to Orihime and Hikoboshi, two legendary lovers of the Japanese tanabata myth.

Lynzee Loveridge of Anime News Network interpreted Kaworu as a negative figure, saying that "Kaworu's kindness has a nefarious side", seeing him as an Angel who deceives and uses Shinji for his own purposes. For Mike Crandol he "is representative of blind, total and unconditional love and acceptance, but like those things Kaoru turns out to not be real at all". Their colleague Zac Bertschy has a mixed opinion in his review of Rebuild 3.0. While not interpreting him as an antagonist or a negative figure, according to Bertschy, his presence demonstrates Shinji's emotional fragility and the difficulty of his long path to self-acceptance. He describes Kaworu as a loving, considerate partner who cares deeply for Shinji's happiness, refuses to leave him behind, and even takes Shinji's terrible burden as his own; he notes, "Shinji has misinterpreted Kaworu's love not as evidence that he himself is worth loving and thus his motivation can be entirely his own, but that Kaworu's love itself makes him worthwhile ... But he's still just fooling himself. He's still making catastrophic decisions motivated by self-hatred – Kaworu's love doesn't make him a complete person". For Kunihiko Ikuhara, director of Sailor Moon and a friend of Hideaki Anno, "Shinji is bullied by his father, slapped by Ayanami, called stupid by Asuka and Misato yells at him to behave like a man; he doesn't receive much compassion from others, and I believe that in this situation the only one to tell him that it's okay as it is, is Kaworu".

Japanese scholar and writer Yūya Satō compared his role to that of the male characters of the yaoi, as well as that of the characters of the shōjo genre; for Satō, the appearance of Kaworu is more important on a thematic than narrative level, and would have the purpose of deepening the psychological aspects of Shinji. She compared his role to shōjo manga, where the process and the relational dynamics of the protagonists have more weight than the conclusion or the fights. Scholar Jessica Bauwens-Sugimoto described Shinji and Kaworu's relationship as "an exceptional pairing for yaoi standards", noting that Kaworu enters the story only near the end of the series; she further argued that "the relationship is unstable and hazily defined, but it already transcends homosociality because of Kaworu's transgression of normative male (and human) boundaries". Writer Álvaro Arbonés argued that the entire episode appears carefully constructed to suggest a romantic subtext, while maintaining that its central theme ultimately concerns the possibility of a sincere friendship free from toxicity. Mechademia writer Mariana Ortega further noted that a figure resembling Kaworu appears in one scene of The End of Evangelion to comfort Shinji; according to Ortega, the sequence "arguably adds homosociality and unresolved homosexual desires to the list of issues impeding Shinji's sexual and psychic maturation". Vrai Kaiser similarly argued that Kaworu represents "Shinji's understanding of 'love' during Instrumentality, and is the 'important person' who breaches his AT field". Japanator writer Elliot Gay described Kaworu as a positive figure, as for Shinji he "represents hope; the hope that maybe he can redo things". Director Anno stated in several interviews that he did not particularly have the yaoi audience in mind while making the series and that, although Shinji blushes, the character is not inclined to "carnal desires" in the episode. Masayuki likewise explained that the staff paid little attention to the yaoi audience during production.

== Cultural impact ==
=== Popularity ===
Cosplay of Kaworu at Comic World Taiwan in 2016

Despite his one-episode appearance, Kaworu became popular among the series' fans, and is just as popular as the female protagonists of Neon Genesis Evangelion, Rei Ayanami and Asuka Langley Soryu. He ranked high in popularity polls about the best anime male characters, the strongest anime pilots, most memorable anime deaths and best Angels in Evangelion. In 1997 and 1998, Kaworu took second and sixth place among the most popular male characters of the moment in two polls conducted by Animage magazine. He also appeared in the monthly surveys of the magazine, remaining in the top twenty in 1997 polls. In 1998 Animage ranked him twenty-third among the most popular anime characters of the moment, and 43rd in 1999.

In August and September 2009, after the release of the Evangelion 2.0 movie, he emerged in sixth and third place among the most popular characters of Newtype magazine; in October he ranked fourth. In March of the following year, Newtype included him among the most popular male characters of the 1990s, giving him second place after Shinji. In February 2015, nearly twenty years after the series first aired, he emerged seventh on Newtype charts. He also ranked in Evangelion popularity polls, usually in the top three. In June 2021, after the 3.0+1.01 re-release of the final Rebuild film, he ranked as the second most popular male character in another Newtype poll.

=== Critical reception ===
The only one who tells [Shinji] that he's fine just the way he is, is Kaworu. "You don't have to try to so hard." Perhaps because of that, after Kaworu appeared, the girls who had been watching Eva and who found it interesting but didn't feel the kind of enthusiasm that the boys felt about it were able to finally connect emotionally with Shinji. Perhaps because of that everyone loves Kaworu.

— Kunihiko Ikuhara

Criticism of Kaworu's character and his relationship with Shinji in the original series has been positive. For Caleb Bailey of Comic Book Resources the hot spring scene "blazed the trail" on homosexual relationships in Japanese animation, being "ahead of its time". Anthony Gramuglia cited Shinji and Kaworu among the best queer representations in Japanese animation, but criticized Kaworu's degrading role in some spin-offs. LGBT-oriented portal Pride.com praised Kaworu and his relationship with Shinji, "especially during a time where LGBTQ representation was almost nonexistent in many forms of media". Lynzee Loveridge of Anime News Network praised its development, finding it "refreshing". Her colleague Kenneth Lee criticized Kaworu as "an enigmatic figure that further adds fuel to the fire of confusion, but he just manages to raise even more questions that remain unanswered". Lee considers their relationship to be "disturbing, gratuitous, and unnecessary". According to Lee, the openness Shinji shows towards Kaworu is implausible and "irrational", so "ultimately, the homosexuality issue seems nothing more than cheap shock value tactics to stun Generation X". According to the website Otaquest, detractors have labeled him as a "yaoi fuel", "while others see him as a vital piece of the Evangelion puzzle".

Screen Rant and Comic Book Resources listed him among the best characters in the series. The twenty-fourth episode is considered one of the best of the series, and his fight with Shinji was also received positively by critics. For Comic Book Resources' Reuben Baron, in particular, his defeat is "the most dramatic example" of the narrative seriousness of Neon Genesis Evangelion later episodes. Screen Rant's Jack Cameron feels his confrontation with Shinji is "perhaps the most heartbreaking of fights in the whole series". Kaworu's last scenes were also appreciated by anime critic Chris Beveridge. According to the Asiascape site, his last scene, in which he is trapped in the hands of Shinji's Eva-01 and marked by a long sixty-second freeze-frame, represents one of the more prominent uses of creative visual motifs in the series. Anime News Network reviewer Carlo Santos appreciated the character of Kaworu and the role he played in Sadamoto's manga; he wrote, "the tension between the two boys soon becomes one of the most intriguing subplots". Zac Bertschy, reviewing Evangelion 3.0, praised the development of their relationship, describing it as the film's highlight. Anime Reign magazine expressed a similar opinion, considering it one of the few merits of characterization in the movie. Nicole MacLean of THEM Anime Reviews found Kaworu's personality and relationship with Shinji in 3.0 effective, but wordy and rushed, while Los Angeles Times's Inkoo Kang considered Kaworu's interactions with Shinji melodramatic.

=== Legacy ===
Kaworu Nagisa has been used for advertising campaigns and a wide range of merchandise, including action figures, nendoroids, backpacks, perfumes, sweets, cosmetics, clothing, toys, key rings, watches and jewelry. On 22 May 1997, Kadokawa Shoten published a book dedicated to him entitled Kaworu – Evangelion Photograph (ＫＡＷＯＲＵ－カヲル－ 新世紀エヴァンゲリオン文庫写真集). In August of the same year, Japanese yaoi magazine June published a volume entitled Zankoku na tenshi no yō ni (残酷な天使のように; lit. "Like a cruel angel"), dedicated to Shinji and Kaworu. The book, whose title is taken from the first verse of the show's theme song, contains two long interviews with Hideaki Anno and dōjinshi by manga artists from the shonen ai scene, such as Reku Fuyanagi (Gundam Wing: Ground Zero) and Takamure Tamotsu (Umi ni nita sora no iro). In 2005, to celebrate the tenth anniversary of the series release, manga artist Mine Yoshizaki designed an action figure of a female version of Angel Tabris named Tabris-XX. As a promotion for its 10th Anniversary Special Edition of Evangelion, ADV Films published a humorous bumper sticker which reads "Kaworu died for your sins". Kaworu's popularity is also parodied in a spin-off manga entitled It's A Miraculous Win (奇跡の勝ちは, Kiseki no kachi wa), released in fourteen volumes from 2006 to 2015, in which a parody of him works in a pachinko parkour and dates an obsessive Evangelion female fan named Sakura Mogami.

In 2008 Kadokawa published a fanbook entitled All About Nagisa Kaworu: A Child of the Evangelion, a collection of fan letters, poems, reprinted manga pages, erotic dōjinshi, and interviews with gravure idols. In 2015 Kadokawa published a third book dedicated to him, entitled Kaworu 2015: Nagisa Kaworu shashin-shū (KAWORU 2015 －渚カヲル写真集－), containing unpublished illustrations, information and interviews with staff. In the same year the 7-Eleven chain put on the market a 166 centimetres (65 in) life-size statue of the character, auctioned and sold for over 1,728,000 Japanese yen. In 2017 the official Evangelion Store inaugurated a summer festival dedicated to Kaworu, offering unreleased merchandise. In 2018 it was used for features of the 500 Type Eva, a high-speed train dedicated to Evangelion. In 2019 Bandai announced a card game dedicated to Evangelion titled Evangelion Card Game; one of the two sets of the game, called Ev02, is dedicated to the characters of Kaworu and Asuka. Tony Takezaki paid homage to him in his comic Tony Takezaki's Evangelion, in which he is parodied by Keroro, the protagonist of Keroro Gunso. References and homages to the character of Kaworu are present in Spider-Verse, and in the dorama The Full-Time Wife Escapist. Japanese singer and voice actress Chiaki Kuriyama stated that she developed interest in voice acting after Kaworu and Rei Ayanami. Comic Book Resources' Kristen Lopez also compared Albedo from Genshin Impact to Kaworu, speculating that the latter character may have been an influence for the former.
