= Mari Illustrious Makinami =

Fictional character in Neon Genesis Evangelion

- Neon Genesis Evangelion character
- First appearance: Evangelion: 2.0 You Can (Not) Advance (2009)
- Created by: Khara
- Voiced by: Japanese: Maaya Sakamoto; English: Deneen Melody (Amazon dub); Trina Nishimura (Funimation)

In-universe information
- Species: Human
- Gender: Female
- Age: Unknown
- Eye colour: Teal
- Notable relatives: Ryoji Kaji

Mari Illustrious Makinami (Japanese: 真希波・マリ・イラストリアス, Hepburn: Makinami Mari Irasutoriasu) or Maria Iscariot (イスカリオテのマリア, Isukariote no Maria) is a fictional character in the anime film tetralogy Rebuild of Evangelion, based on the television series Neon Genesis Evangelion and introduced in the film Evangelion: 2.0 You Can (Not) Advance (2009). Mari is a pilot for the European branch of the special agency Nerv, founded to counter enemies of humankind known as the Angels. She first appears aboard the mecha Evangelion Unit 05, before fighting on Evangelion Unit 02 in place of Asuka Langley Shikinami. Brave and tenacious on the battlefield, Mari is friendly, lighthearted and humorous with her colleagues. She is originally voiced by Maaya Sakamoto; in the English-language version, she is voiced by Trina Nishimura and Deneen Melody. Besides the Rebuild of Evangelion films, Mari appears in an extra chapter of the Neon Genesis Evangelion manga, written and illustrated by Yoshiyuki Sadamoto, and in several video games.

The character was created after a request by Toshimichi Ōtsuki, producer of the original anime, to introduce a new female character to the Rebuild to attract a new audience. Hideaki Anno, director and main screenwriter of the original series and the films, decided not to meddle in the pilot and replicate the other main characters, all of whom were based on his personality. He entrusted its development to other members of Khara studio, particularly Kazuya Tsurumaki. The concept went through a complex chain of changes and second thoughts; neither Anno nor the others knew what kind of heroine to create, and were undecided until the last minute. Her character design was entrusted to Sadamoto, the series' character designer, who played on stereotypical elements associated with England.

The character had a mixed reception from critics. Reviewers were divided between those who found her overly sexualized and her role insignificant and those who found her a viable alternative to the characterization of the other protagonists. Evangelion: 3.0+1.0 Thrice Upon a Time (2021) revealed more details about Mari, which generated more mixed reviews; some critics noted a lack of explanation of her nature, and others appreciated her psychology and her role in the finale.

== Conception ==
For the film Evangelion: 2.0 You Can (Not) Advance (2009), the second instalment of the Rebuild of Evangelion saga, King Records representative and former Neon Genesis Evangelion producer Toshimichi Ōtsuki requested a new female character to strengthen its appeal and expand its audience. Director and main screenwriter Hideaki Anno welcomed the idea as a breath of fresh air which would distance the new films from the original work and give its audience fan service. Anno planned to introduce Mari in the film's opening scenes and play on ha (破), a kanji in the film's Japanese title which has the two meanings of "interlude" and "break". Her presence was initially intended to be minor; not speaking, she would be introduced by other characters. Mari's personality, speech and first battle, however, varied during development. Anno was conflicted; as producer and director he wanted to introduce changes to the story through her, but as the original series writer he did not want to make major changes.

Mari was introduced in a promotional poster for the film which was noted by fans. Her first name was revealed in the Nintendo DS game Petit Eva: Evangelion@School, and her surnames were introduced in Eva Extra magazine. Anno, as he did with other characters in Neon Genesis Evangelion, combined two actual warship names. He chose the aircraft carrier HMS Illustrious, lead ship of the British Royal Navy's class of the same name, for Mari's first surname; her second surname was inspired by the Makinami from the Ayanami class destroyer of the Japanese Maritime Self-Defense Force. The kanji nami (波; litt. "wave") played on the names of the series' other two main female characters, Rei Ayanami and Asuka Langley Soryu ("Shikinami Langley" in Rebuild of Evangelion). The new pilot was initially planned to be named Mariko (マリコ), an homage to a character by Moyoco Anno, Anno's wife. The director also considered Chizuru (ちづる), in reference to Chizuru Nambara in Combattler V. The name Mari was finally chosen in homage to Mari Sakurano's character in Brave Raideen.

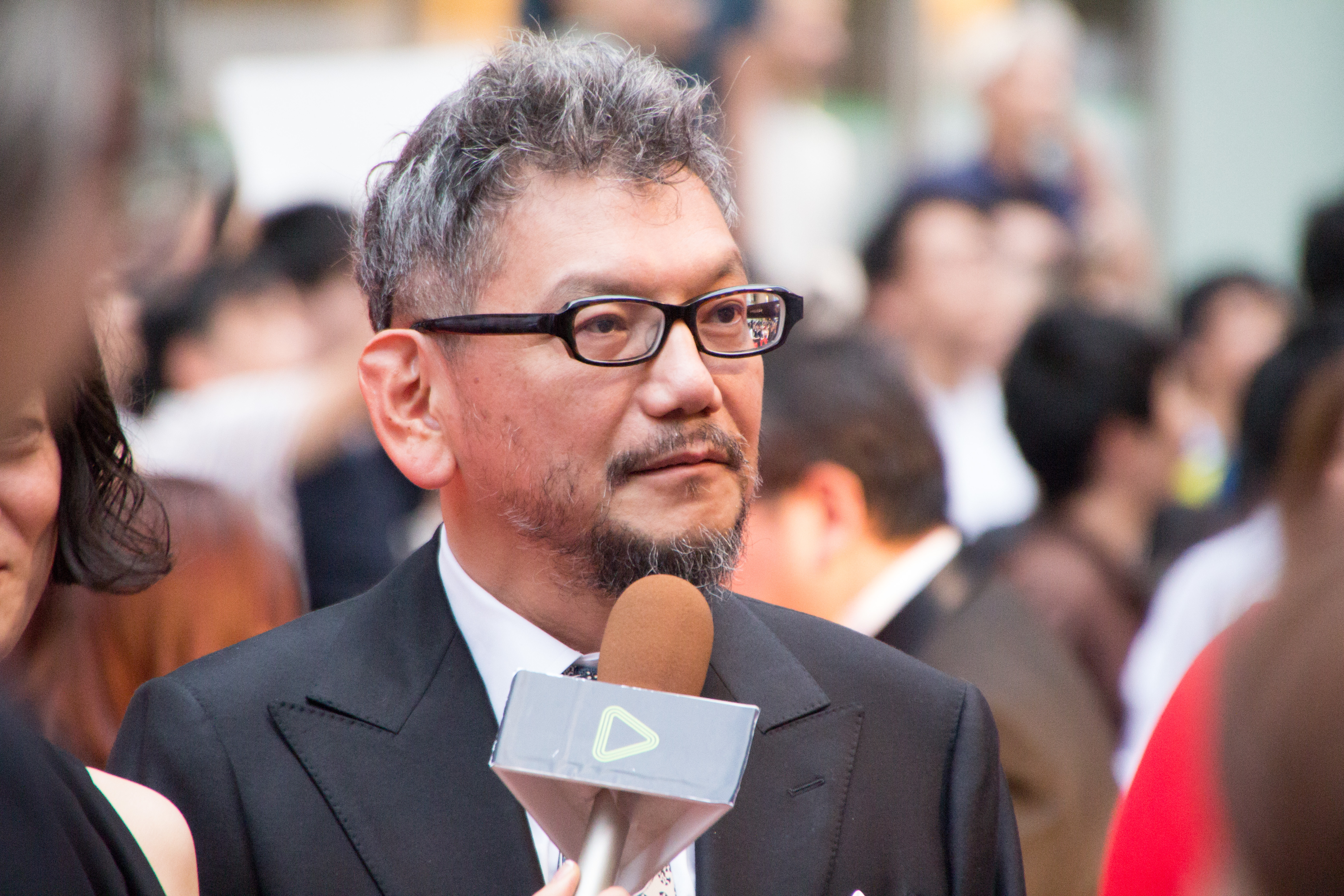
Neon Genesis Evangelion and Rebuild of Evangelion director Hideaki Anno

Anno struggled with the character, unable to decide on Mari's role and personality. He first feared that he was forcing her into the story to distance Rebuild of Evangelion from the classic series; his early drafts were uneven, and she only appeared in the film's opening scene. Anno rewatched the original anime, trying to come up with original ideas, but was constrained by the main characters' rigid roles. The inclusion of novelty, in his opinion, could have ruined the whole work. Anno was thus vague at first, giving generic directions to his colleagues at studio Khara, such as the new character loving animals. Anno's generic guidance complicated the staff's work; assistant director Kazuya Tsurumaki said that Mari seemed to have "multiple personalities" and was a different character in each scene, and it was difficult to make her consistent. Anno's instructions included, "In this scene, she looks for her glasses"; "She says meow" (にゃ, nya) at the end of the sentence", and "Her breasts need to get bigger". Wanting to make the character foreign, he decided to hang back so she would be different from the existing characters in the classic series and entrusted her creation to others, particularly Tsurumaki.

In the first version of Anno's storyline, Mari became active in the third chapter and appeared briefly in the second. The opening scene of 2.0 tried to break with the old Evangelion, with dialogue in Russian and English. The familiar voice of Ryoji Kaji, the first character to interact with Mari, was added to reassure viewers and not be confused by the innovations. Anno wanted to avoid exploring her in depth, preferring to emphasize Asuka. After the premiere of Evangelion 1.0: You Are (Not) Alone at Shinjuku Milano, however, a rewrite of the second film began. About forty changes were made to the script until the last minute; when the roles of Rei, Asuka, and Misato Katsuragi became clear, Anno still found problems with Mari's. He attempted to create an as-yet-untried character type, but did not know what exactly to do. Due to fan demand, Anno expanded Mari's scenes from the script's first drafts. Some ideas were rejected by other staff members and discarded, such as a scene in which Mari and Asuka would fight in the same Evangelion against the eighth Angel in a nininbaori, a Japanese comedic act where two people wear the same large coat and pretend to be one person. Another shelved suggestion saw her in the role of Asuka's European classmate, which would have weakened Asuka's isolation. Other possibilities involved Mari meeting Shinji Ikari near a railroad track and drinking tea on the roof of a school; after several drafts, however, her character was still unclear to Anno.

The result was a character somewhat similar to Rei, Asuka, and Misato; Tsurumaki remained dissatisfied, believing that he could not detach Evangelion 2.0: You Can (Not) Advance from the original series. He wanted to have Mari do something bizarre, such as parachute from the sky; her meeting with Shinji was storyboarded just in February 2009, while Tsurumaki and other staff members continued to work close to the deadline. To decide on her personality, Anno asked other staff members, including Yōji Enokido, for their opinions. Enokido, remembering harem anime stereotypes, proposed a fighter like Sapphire in Osamu Tezuka's Princess Knight, so a neutral, carefree and innocent character. Anno then came up with a childlike girl similar to Chiyoko Wato in Tezuka's Mitsume ga Tōru, considering her more realistic. Other ideas were proposed; studio staff suggested that Mari belonged to a wealthy English family, owned several cats, and had tattoos of her pets' names. Ikko Todoroki suggested making Mari a guest at Hikari Horaki's house and a rival with Asuka for Kaji's attention and control of Unit 02. Another proposal by Enokido included a romantic subplot with Shinji.

=== Design ===
Early designs of Mari by Yoshiyuki Sadamoto

Character designer Yoshiyuki Sadamoto gave Mari a stereotypically English look. Anno tried to influence her design as little as possible, giving very rough guidelines to Sadamoto and Tsurumaki and only checking the completed work. Using the stereotype of a meganekko girl, Sadamoto added Mari eyeglasses. This succeeded in aesthetically differentiating her from the other protagonists; glasses were seldom used for the characters in the classic series to simplify the animators' work. Anno finally chose the sketch with the eyeglasses for Mari's preview in the credits of You Are (Not) Alone, which was later refined by Sadamoto. The only guidelines Sadamoto received from the staff were for a "British-style" girl who was a student at a private Christian institution. When he asked Anno what he meant by a "private Christian institution," however, Anno said that he did not know. Sadamoto imagined Mari with Victorian-era clothes and a parasol before opting for a plaid skirt. Anno gave him photographs of British schoolgirls as a reference, and Sadamoto noticed that most of them wore tights and jackets with colourful borders. First giving Mari a long-sleeved jacket inspired by the protagonists in Danny Boyle's 1996 film Trainspotting, he opted for a simple white shirt and tie because of the anime's summer setting.

The studio required a character who would appeal to a new audience, and Sadamoto had to keep that requirement in mind. Merging the characteristics of Asuka and Rei at first, he found that too derivative. To visually distinguish her from the two protagonists of the classic series, he gave Mari straight, dark hair and a thinner head and body than her colleagues. He also designed her with long and well-defined eyes, giving her a cute appearance. Sadamoto then decided to give her two braids; since Asuka has a similar hairstyle, Anno suggested adding a headband. The artist took inspiration from Umemura Hikari, a character from the dorama My Boss, My Hero, played by Yui Aragaki.

Anno decided to have Mari wear two battle suits, one older and one newer, to further distinguish her from the other pilots. During the film's early production, a green, indigo, or yellow plug suit was considered; pink, a popular color in the Japanese animation industry, was ultimately chosen to give Mari a more feminine touch. Sadamoto later noticed that pink had less visual impact than Rei and Asuka's red and white designs, so he designed her an old green suit, a more "outrageous" color stereotypically associated with England, at the suggestion of colorist Kikuchi Kazuko. For Mari's old costume design he took inspiration from the uniforms of the Gamilas in Space Battleship Yamato and from the space suits in the British television series UFO. Cold War Soviet space-suit design inspired Sadamoto to color the lower part of the old plug suit checkered-green. Sadamoto wanted to make the new plug suit more modern than the green one, taking advantage of technology and noting the differences between the first and second series of the Lotus Elise spyder. Anno also decided to give Mari a helmet, covering her face until the end of the first battle for dramatic effect, and Sadamoto took his cue from bicycle helmets. The design of her lower clothing was based on a fencing suit, suggesting membership in the European aristocracy.

=== Voice ===
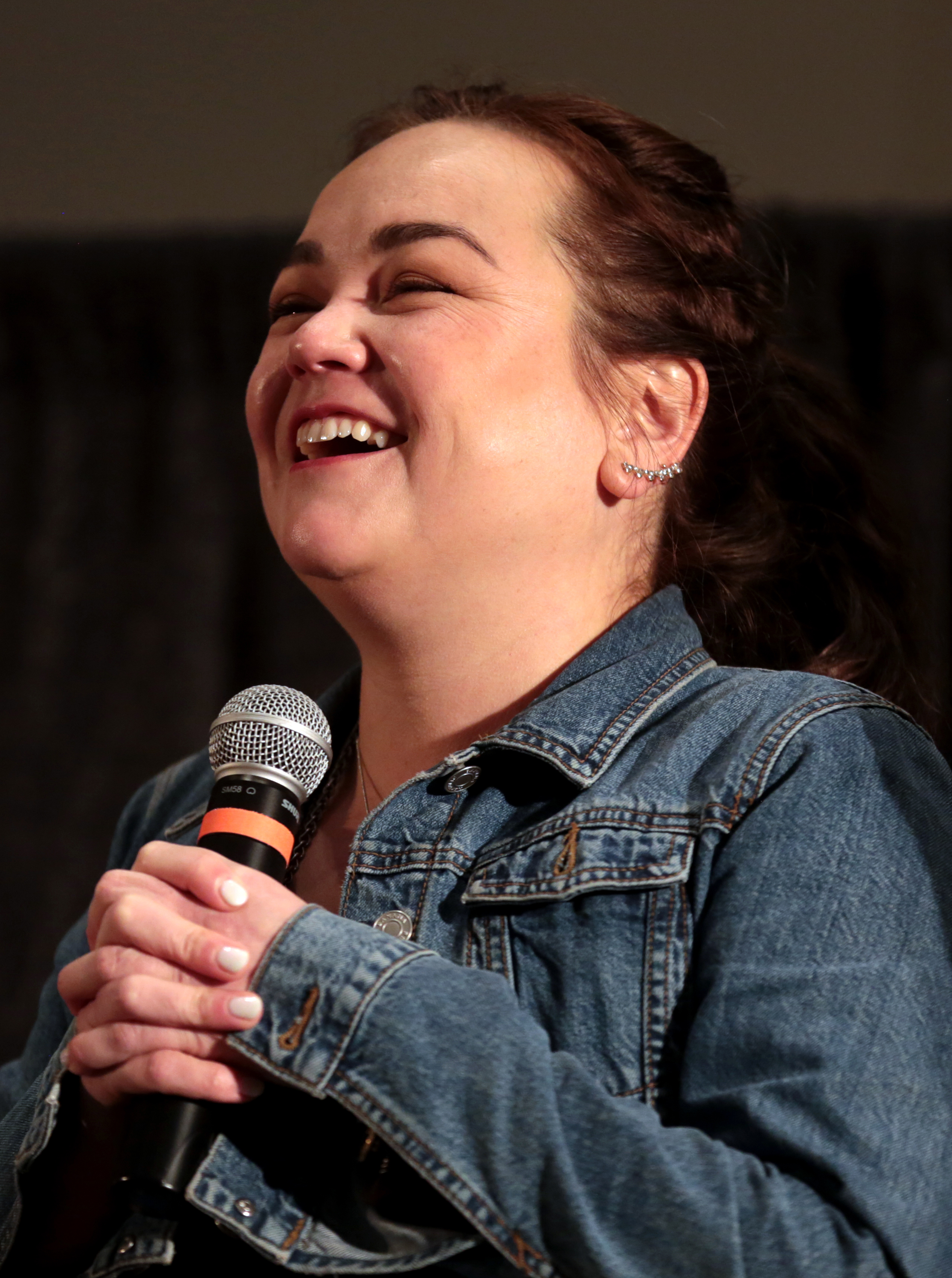
Trina Nishimura voiced Mari in the first English-language version.

The choice of Mari's voice actress was postponed for a long time, since Anno tried to avoid meddling too much in the character's creation. During a studio party, however, Ōtsuki said that the production was close to recording but the role had not been cast and the director had provided no input. Anno asked the other staff members who they thought would be most suitable. Sadamoto discussed the matter with Tsurumaki, who suggested several actors, including Maaya Sakamoto, who had previously worked with him on Diebuster. Tsurumaki noted that Sakamoto's voice would make Mari more endearing and suggested her to Anno, who immediately accepted. Sakamoto, hired without an audition, felt "under pressure" at first; when she began recording, however, the atmosphere changed. With no precise information about Mari, she had to voice her intuitively. Anno immediately stopped Sakamoto's initial exaggerated acting. She finally synchronized with Mari playing her in the first battle, channelling her nervousness into the character, and the staff praised her performance.

Sakamoto wanted further instruction from Anno, who remained vague. She turned to Tsurumaki, who was precise, detailed, and helped her interpret the character. Sakamoto eventually made Mari an "alien" element, breaking with the old Evangelion. Her performance was praised by Sadamoto, and Tsurumaki said that after hearing her voice he began to understand the character for the first time. Anno eventually made suggestions to Sakamoto, by giving it the keyword "father of the Shōwa period" (昭和のおやじ, Shōwa no oyaji), so a typical 1970s Japanese parent. She was asked to act like a beast in the scene where Mari uses the Beast mode, lowering her tone of voice until it became hoarse.

By Evangelion: 3.0 You Can (Not) Redo (2012), the third instalment of the saga, Sakamoto felt less anxious and as if Mari "had been there [from] the beginning". Unclear about the film's plot, since Mari appears mainly in action scenes and does not interact much with the other characters, she tried not to worry about it and continued delivering an energetic performance. Sakamoto was guided by Anno, who gave her secret instructions she stated to want to take "to the grave". In Evangelion: 3.0+1.0 Thrice Upon a Time (2021), the last chapter of the Rebuild of Evangelion, she tried to play the role simply and convey positivity, joy, and innocence. Mari, who recalled a Shōwa-era father, had to appear neither old nor young, neither male nor female. Sakamoto adopted this neutral technique for the scene in which Mari talks to Deputy Commander Fuyutusuki, and it worked on her first attempt. She had to do the post-recording nearly alone, without seeing the other voice actors except for Yūko Miyamura, Asuka's voice actress.

Trina Nishimura voiced Mari in the first English-language version, while Deneen Melody voiced the character in the Amazon Prime Video release of Rebuild.

== Appearances ==
=== Rebuild of Evangelion ===
Mari is a girl of English descent who is introduced in the film Evangelion: 2.0 You Can (Not) Advance. Nothing is revealed about her life or origins, except that she has a mysterious relationship with Ryoji Kaji, apparently her superior. In the first scenes of the film, she boards a mecha named Unit Evangelion 05, or Eva-05, with Kaji's permission. She makes her first sortie in a place named Bethania base, where she faces the third in a series of enemies named Angels. Mari acts instinctively, moving without a clear plan, and says that she does not want to involve adults in her goal. Although she seems to have the worst of it at first, she defeats her enemy. The Angel generates a large explosion, from which Mari escapes.

She parachutes to the roof of the Tokyo-3 Municipal Middle School some time later, colliding and getting acquainted with Evangelion Unit 01 pilot Shinji Ikari. The city is then attacked by the tenth Angel, Zeruel; Mari, unbeknownst to the special agency Nerv, takes control of Evangelion Unit 02, formerly owned by Asuka Langley Shikinami. She uses several weapons to pierce Zeruel's AT Field barrier, repeatedly striking the enemy and demonstrating familiarity with Evangelion units. Despite the attacks, the Angel is unharmed. Mari then activates a mode called the Beast; the mecha begins to walk like a four-legged animal and furiously attacks the target. Zeruel defends itself by cutting off the arms and striking the head of Eva-02, and Rei Ayanami's Evangelion Unit 00 begins to fight it. The Eva-02 bites the enemy's AT Field, which counterattacks; Rei saves Mari by flinging her unit away from the battlefield. Mari's mecha falls on a civilian shelter where Shinji Ikari, intent on abandoning Nerv, is located; Mari lifts him with her mecha hand, and shows him the annihilation of Rei's Eva-00. Shinji boards the Eva-01 and confronts Zeruel to save Rei after this.

In Evangelion: 3.0 You Can (Not) Redo, set fourteen years after the second chapter in a nearly-unlivable world, Mari is part of an organization formed to destroy Nerv known as Wille. Her body, like that of the other pilots, has remained unchanged due to what is called "the curse of the Evas". She often works with Asuka Shikinami, with whom she has a close relationship, and obeys the orders of Captain Misato Katsuragi. She and Asuka head with Mari's Evangelion Unit 08 into space to intercept and recover 01, with Shinji inside it. Sometime later Asuka's Eva-02 and Mari's Eva-08 face another Evangelion, the Evangelion-13 with Shinji and Kaworu Nagisa aboard in the Nerv base. Mari covers Asuka during the fight and pulls Shinji out of the robot's cockpit, asking him to save Asuka.

In Evangelion 3.0+1.0: Thrice Upon a Time, the final instalment of the saga, Mari attacks with her Eva-08 a series of Evas called 44As and an army of generator-equipped Eva 44Bs in Paris. She later prepares with Asuka and Shinji at the Wille and they head to the South Pole, the epicenter of the catastrophic Second Impact. Mari and Asuka, on their respective Evangelions, face a series of enemies known as Mark.07. At the end of the battle, Mari has Shinji board the Eva-01 to confront Gendo Ikari; she enters the ship containing Nerv's deputy commander, Kozo Fuyutsuki, and says goodbye to him. At the end of the film, Mari and Shinji meet on a beach and say goodbye again to the Evangelions. They meet much later on the platform of Ube Station. Mari removes a collar named DSS Choker from Shinji's neck and they take each other by the hand, ready to live in a new world.

=== Neon Genesis Evangelion manga ===
Mari appears in an extra chapter in the last volume of the Neon Genesis Evangelion manga, written and drawn by Yoshiyuki Sadamoto between 1994 and 2013, in which she is introduced as a sixteen-year-old student enrolled at Kyoto University, the same school attended by researcher Yui Ikari, who plays the role of her senpai and spiritual guide. The rector summons her to his office, proposing an internship in England; Mari is uncomfortable with Gendo Rokubungi, a colleague who has recently become romantically involved with Yui. Mari declares her feelings to Yui at the end of the story, wishing her a happy life with Gendo.

According to Sadamoto, the chapter should be understood as separate from the feature story; it was conceived and developed without input from the Khara studio staff. The artist made it as an homage to Mari and an opportunity to explore unusual aspects of the character, such as her habit of calling Gendo "Gendo-kun" and singing songs from the Shōwa period, representing her as a young woman in love with Yui. The manga artist assumed that Mari is part of the same generation as Shinji's mother and became a pilot, never growing up. Some fans similarly speculated that Mari's physique remained unchanged due to the Eva curse. Megumi Ogata, Shinji Ikari's Japanese voice actress, provided a similar interpretation about her true age.

=== Other media ===
Mari is featured in Neon Genesis Evangelion: Anima, a light novel by series mecha designer Ikuto Yamashita set three years after the events of the original animated series. In the light novel, Mari is a seven-year-old girl artificially created by the North American branch of Nerv to become a pilot for a unit called US Evangelion/Wolfpac (US エヴァンゲリオン/ウルフパツク). Due to hybrid genes used in her development, Mari has feline traits, loves animals and is a close friend of Rei Six, a clone of Ayanami. Chibi versions of Mari and her Eva-05 also appear in the Petit Eva: Evangelion@School comic strip, a parody of the original series. In addition to the video and pachinko games from the original animated series, Mari has appeared outside the Evangelion franchise, such as in the video games Puyopuyo!! Quest, The Battle Cats, Monster Strike, Tales of Zestiria, Puzzle & Dragons, Million Arthur, Hortensia Saga, Keri hime sweets, Summons Board, Othellonia, Final Gear and the RPG Kotodaman.

== Characterization ==
No matter what circumstances she was living under, Mari is fundamentally an optimist and does not worry too much. She may have her own worries, but she's not the type to show them, and she always seems to be having fun. I think that's what makes her such a contrast to Shinji and the other characters. She has no two faces, so I tried to play the role with as few complex nuances as possible. No matter how desperate the scene may seem, Mari believes that things are going in the right direction, and she is happy, which is the nuance of joy I tried to convey in my voice.

— Maaya Sakamoto

Mari is a cheerful, outgoing, ironic, self-confident, absent-minded and eccentric girl. She seems to have no regard for the limits of her strength or her Eva unit, piloting it with enthusiasm. Mari is distinguished by her casual and sensual ways. Unlike her colleagues, who are emotionally addicted to the Evangelions or intimidated by confrontations with enemies, she demonstrates strength and self-confidence. In the fight with the tenth Angel, Mari activates the Beast mode without worrying about mental contamination. Her Eva unleashes an animalistic force, biting off the enemy's AT Field. She has a wry, contemptuous smile, even in seemingly-hopeless situations. Mari is also clear and forthright; Anno explained to voice actress Maaya Sakamoto her psychology, saying she "does exactly what she says".

In 3.0+1.0 Mari reveals to love literature, having collected many books with the dream of reading all books written in the whole history of humanity. According to Yōji Enokido, a staff member of You Can (Not) Advance, Mari differed in several respects from Asuka and Rei Ayanami, the two female protagonists of the classic series: "She is not practical like Asuka, but thinks about 'deep' things, like one of those people who can see mysterious things, such as those related to the gods". He also compared her to a miko, a young woman who works at Shinto temples and channels deities. Enokido also emphasized that Mari was very talkative, different from Rei's otherworldly air.

Assistant director Kazuya Tsurumaki described her as an "irresponsible," shrewd, and stubborn young woman, the kind of girl who "uses her apparent frivolity to her advantage". She is portrayed as an "irresponsible," cunning, and stubborn young woman. Her eccentric character is reflected in her colloquial, expressive, and ironic way of speaking; in the original version, Mari calls Asuka "princess" (姫, hime) and Shinji Ikari "puppy" (ワンコ君, wanko-kun). She maintains that attitude with elders, using the honorific suffix kun (君) for Gendō Ikari, typically used in confidential and informal situations. Mari ends sentences with the onomatopoeic nya, stereotypically associated with cats and kawaii characters in manga and anime. Sakamoto described her as a simple person who does things her way and does not care about the rest, happy to pilot an Eva. According to the actress, Mari "really likes people", particularly Shinji and Asuka; Asuka treats Mari coldly but she still calls her "princess," respecting and protecting her "as if she were a special person".

=== Cultural references and themes ===
In the opening scenes of Evangelion 2.0, Anno decided to have Mari sing 365 no march (三百六十五歩のマーチ; litt. "the 365-step march"), a 1968 song originally performed by Kiyoko Suizenji to which he listened as a child and which was meant to depict her connection to the Shōwa period. The song was intended to induce a "feeling of ease" and relaxation. In the battle against the tenth Angel, Anno had Mari say dokkoisho (ドッコイショ) – typical of traditional Sōran Bushi dance, conveying the idea of an "old man" from the era. Similarly, in the early scenes of Evangelion 3.0 Mari hums the opening theme of Arrow Emblem: Hawk of the Grand Prix, an anime aired from 1977 to 1978. Other songs related to and sung by the character are Mamikazumichi no māchi (真実一路のマーチ) by Suizenji, Sekai ha futari no tameni (世界は二人のために) by Naomi Sagara and Hitori janai no (ひとりじゃないの) by Mari Amachi. Moreover, in Evangelion 3.0+1.0, Sakamoto was asked to imitate Chōsuke Ikariya, a Japanese comedian and actor who was the leader of the 1960s musical group The Drifters.

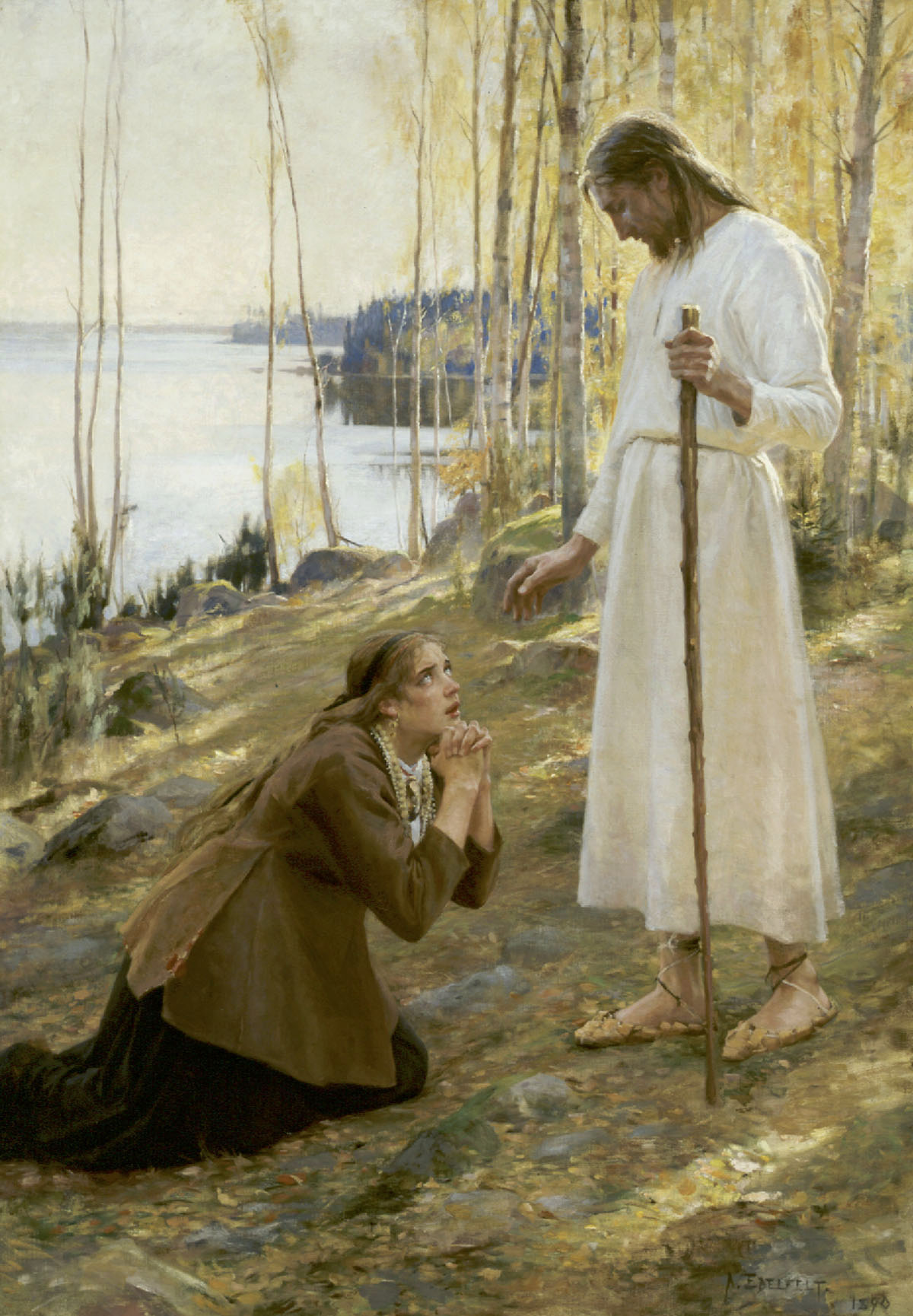
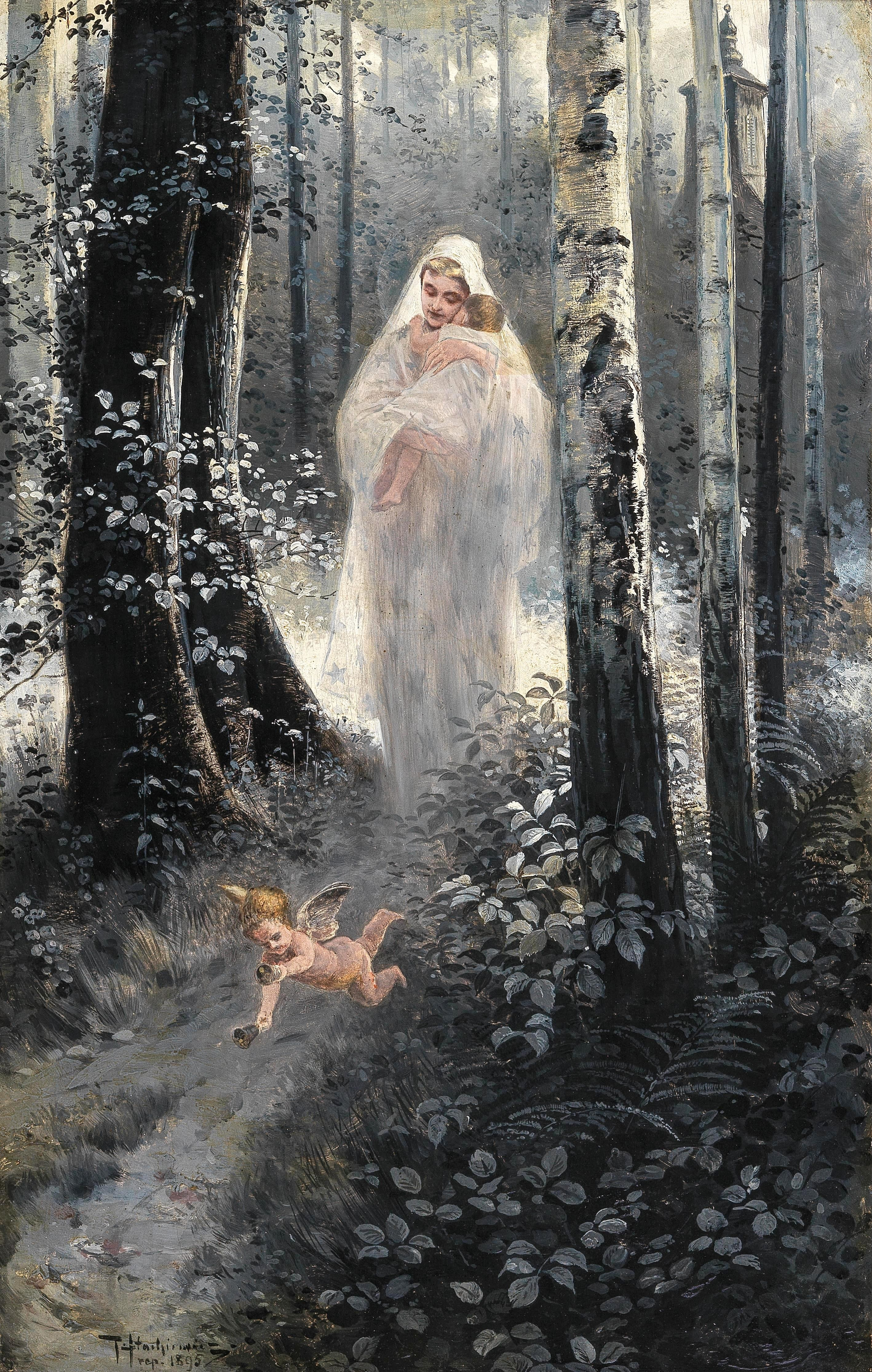
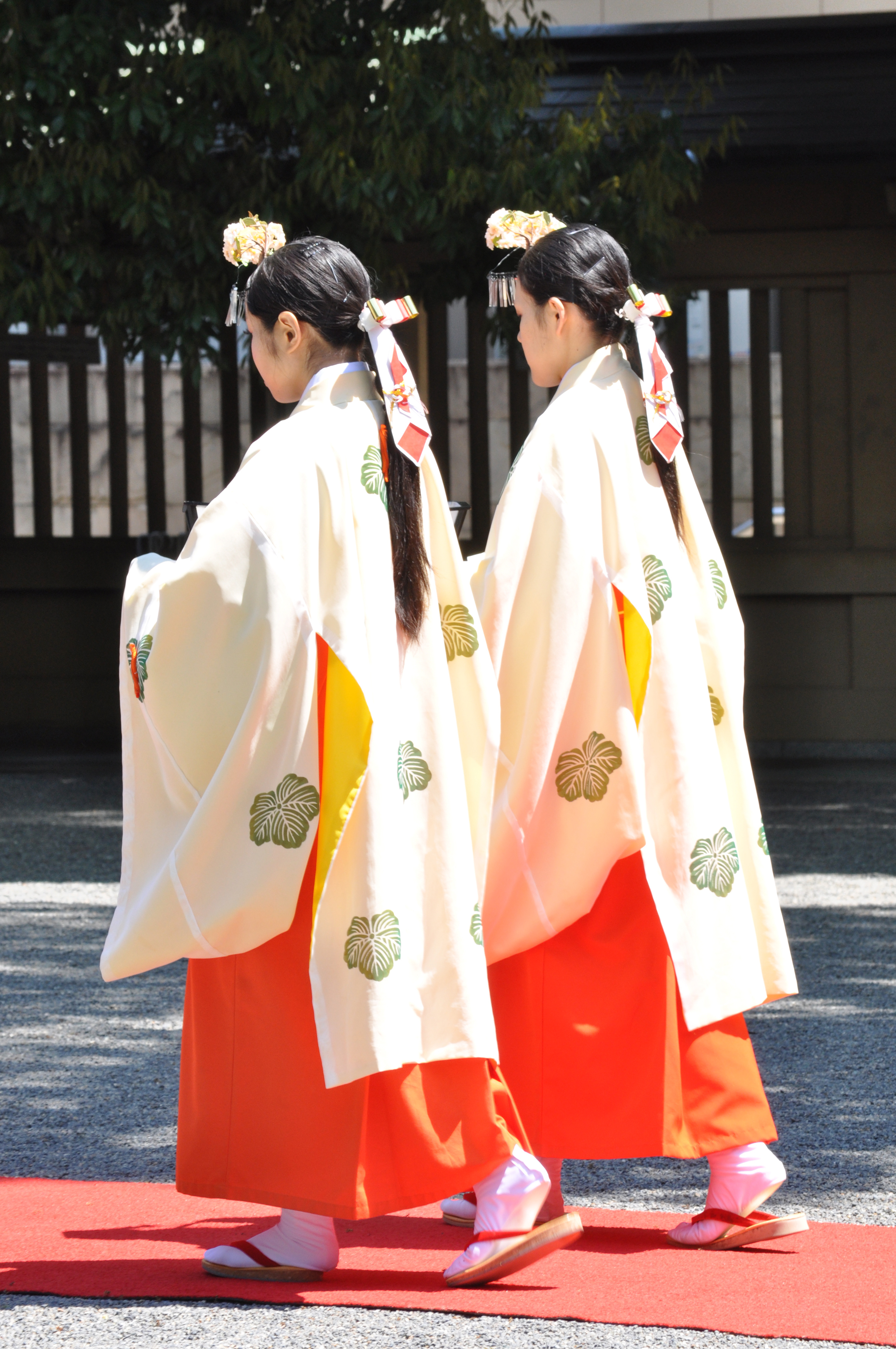
Mari has been compared by critics and studio staff to religious figures such as Mary Magdalene, the Virgin Mary and Shinto mikos.

In Evangelion: 2.0, Mari clashes with Shinji on the roof of the Tokyo-3 school; the boy's Digital Audio Tape, which in the classic series is stuck on tracks 25 and 26, advances to track 27. According to Anno, "the connection between Shinji's S-DAT starting to act up" and Mari's fall to the rooftop was "the result of casuality"; the scene was rewritten many times, and originally conceived to be inserted after a scene in which the Eva-02 is sealed.

Mari has been interpreted as a representation of the Other, since she is the only character who was not created by Anno. Academic Nicole Lamerichs described her as "an outsider, and, because of that, the only person who can change this narrative". Other fans have interpreted her as an alter ego of Moyoco Anno, the director's wife; the parallel was mentioned by Toshio Okada, co-founder of Gainax and an old acquaintance of Anno. Khara staff, however, denied the comparison. Moyoco herself commented on the issue, asking not to be likened to the character.

In 3.0+1.0, Professor Fuyutsuki calls Mari "Maria Iscariot"; the name has been interpreted as a reference to Judas Iscariot, the apostle who betrayed and handed over Jesus to the Jewish authorities and Mary Magdalene. Writer Álvaro Arbonés also connected Mari's first battle, in which she faces the skeletal third Angel with her spear-wielding Eva-05, to the traditional iconography of the medieval knight defeating the dragon. Nicole Lamerichs noted how Mari is intimately connected to Evangelion units and interpreted her character as a reimagining of the classic trope of the fighting girl, already present in female characters such as Utena Tenjō from Revolutionary Girl Utena or Lady Oscar from The Rose of Versailles. Lamerichs also saw a queer subtext in the scenes between her and Asuka and interpreted the series finale, in which she travels with Shinji to the real world, as an anti-escapist message, already presented by Anno in The End of Evangelion (1997).

Japanese critic Naoya Fujita, noting that Mari can activate the Beast mode, described her as an "animalistic" character, a symbol of the affirmation of life, humanity, the body, and desire. According to Fujita, Mari would also represent a philosophy different from that of the TV anime. In 2.0, Mari urges Shinji to escape from Nerv; this, for Fujita, would make her the first person in the Evangelion universe to affirm "the need to run away". He wrote that Mari is "a being who does not suffer from the Christian sense of original sin or modern self-awareness", and compared her sensuality to that of the protagonist of Cutie Honey, a 2004 film directed by Anno. Blu-ray.com reviewer Jeffrey Kauffman found elements of Asuka in the character. Comic Book Resources saw potential romance in the relationship between them, seeing a bisexual subtext in their interaction, while Screen Rant interpreted Shinji and Mari in the last scene of the saga as a couple. Shinji Higuchi called Mari a female version of Kaworu Nagisa, another character in the classic series. Kazuya Tsurumaki described her as a decisive pilot, similar to Captain Tatsumi Tashiro or Koichirō Outa in Gunbuster. According to Khara staff, Mari "has Tsurumaki's libido in her" and seems to have come from his FLCL series; Tsurumaki said that he had tried to create a character who was "not from Evangelion", representing "common ground" between himself and Anno, and did not intend to reproduce a character similar to those in his previous series.

== Cultural impact ==
=== Public response ===
Mari was received positively in Japan; although she appeared in only a few scenes, she immediately attracted public attention. She became popular, and appeared in the monthly polls of readers' favourite animated characters in the magazine Newtype; she placed third in September 2009, months after the debut of Evangelion 2.0. Mari was ranked 24th on Newtype's March 2010 list of the best female characters of the 2000s. She topped the list in July of that year, and finished eighth in August. In June 2021, in conjunction with the release of Evangelion: 3.0+1.0 Thrice Upon a Time, the character returned to Newtype's monthly polls in third place.

Yahoo! Japan asked in 2009 to anime fans which animated heroine they would like to marry; Mari finished first, with 11,348 votes. In 2013, the website AnimeOne asked its users to name the best female character with glasses in the history of Japanese animation; Mari finished 37th, with about two hundred votes. Similar polls were also taken by the website Goo Ranking in which she ranked among the best glasses-wearing characters for several years, and was listed among Sakamoto's most memorable roles. In popularity polls of Neon Genesis Evangelion characters, Mari consistently placed in the top ten but usually the lowest Eva pilot.

=== Critical reception ===
Mari received mixed critical reviews. Her erotic fan-service scenes were criticized, and some critics noted the lack of explanation of her character. In The Anime Encyclopedia, Jonathan Clements and Helen McCarthy wrote that Mari seemed to be inserted into the franchise as a "cynical exercise in justifying new action figures" but "making it clear this story was diverging far from the original". Mark Sombillo of Anime News Network and Nicole MacLean of THEM Anime Reviews agreed; Browne, appreciating hints about Mari's role in the Rebuild storyline, criticized the character's lack of depth and absurdly complicated English dialogue which made her seem out of place. Rehan Fontes of Comic Book Resources saw Mari as futile and flat, existing only for fan service and to pander to the otaku fan base. Morgan Lewis of VGCultureHQ, who had favourably reviewed You Can (Not) Advance, disliked Mari because of the fan service and the scene in which she talks to Shinji before he decides to re-board his own Eva detracting from Kaji's character.

Mari's liveliness and enthusiasm cuts such a sharp contrast to the established Eva pilots that her addition feels incongruous, but that is likely the point: she is intended to shake up the status quo and show that one does not have to be socially maladjusted to pilot an Eva. Though she plays an important role in two of the movies' big fight scenes, she does not get enough screen time here for viewers to figure out much about her motives or purpose, but she is the breath of fresh air that the franchise needs and helps restore the sense of mystery inherent in the original series.

— Martin Theron (Anime News Network)

Mari's role in Evangelion: 3.0 was also criticized for the same reasons, with Anime Reign magazine describing her as a superfluous character who contributes nothing noteworthy to the plot. Nicole MacLean of T.H.E.M. Anime Reviews called her entertaining, but enigmatic and underdeveloped. Chris Homer of The Fandom Post gave Mari an honourable mention in his 2019 list of the ten best British characters in Japanese animation, praising her lighthearted and combative attitude. He found the character underdeveloped, however, and apparently included for fan service.

Other reviewers praised Mari and her introduction. Bryan Morton of The Fandom Post liked her personality, describing her as a welcome dose of uncertainty in a familiar story. Josh Tolentino of Japanator listed her among the best British anime characters and liked the fact that, unlike the other pilots, she seemed happy to board an Eva; this made her "more interesting" than the franchise's other characters. Anime News Network's Martin Theron wrote, "She is the breath of fresh air that the franchise needs and helps restore the sense of mystery inherent in the original series". Game Rant writer Matthew Magnus Lundeen similarly stated that, "somehow she just works".

Evangelion 3.0+1.0, the final chapter in the Rebuild saga, also received mixed reviews. Some fans were puzzled by the final scene in which Mari takes Shinji's hand in Ube Station; the gesture was interpreted as indicating a romantic relationship between them, contradicting the idea that the young man would get involved with Asuka. Several English-speaking reviewers criticized the character, finding her role underdeveloped and noting the lack of explanation about her. Other critics praised the character and her role in the latest film. Henrique Padula of IGN, calling her the shallowest of the saga's pilots, nevertheless appreciated the clarity of her role. Raul Velazquez of Game Rant praised her battle scenes, saying that she may deserve as much cosplay as Rei and Asuka. Rebuen Baron of Comic Book Resources called her uninteresting compared to the characters in the classic series, but "she actually serves more of a purpose beyond simple fan service"; Baron wrote that her stability positively affects Shinji, a factor "extremely important to make the ending work as well as it does". Comic Book Resources colleague Daniel Kurland said that Mari would be a vital element in the growth of Shinji and the other characters and, interpreting her as a metaphor for Anno's wife, described her as an "even more poignant and important" element for the protagonist.

=== Legacy ===
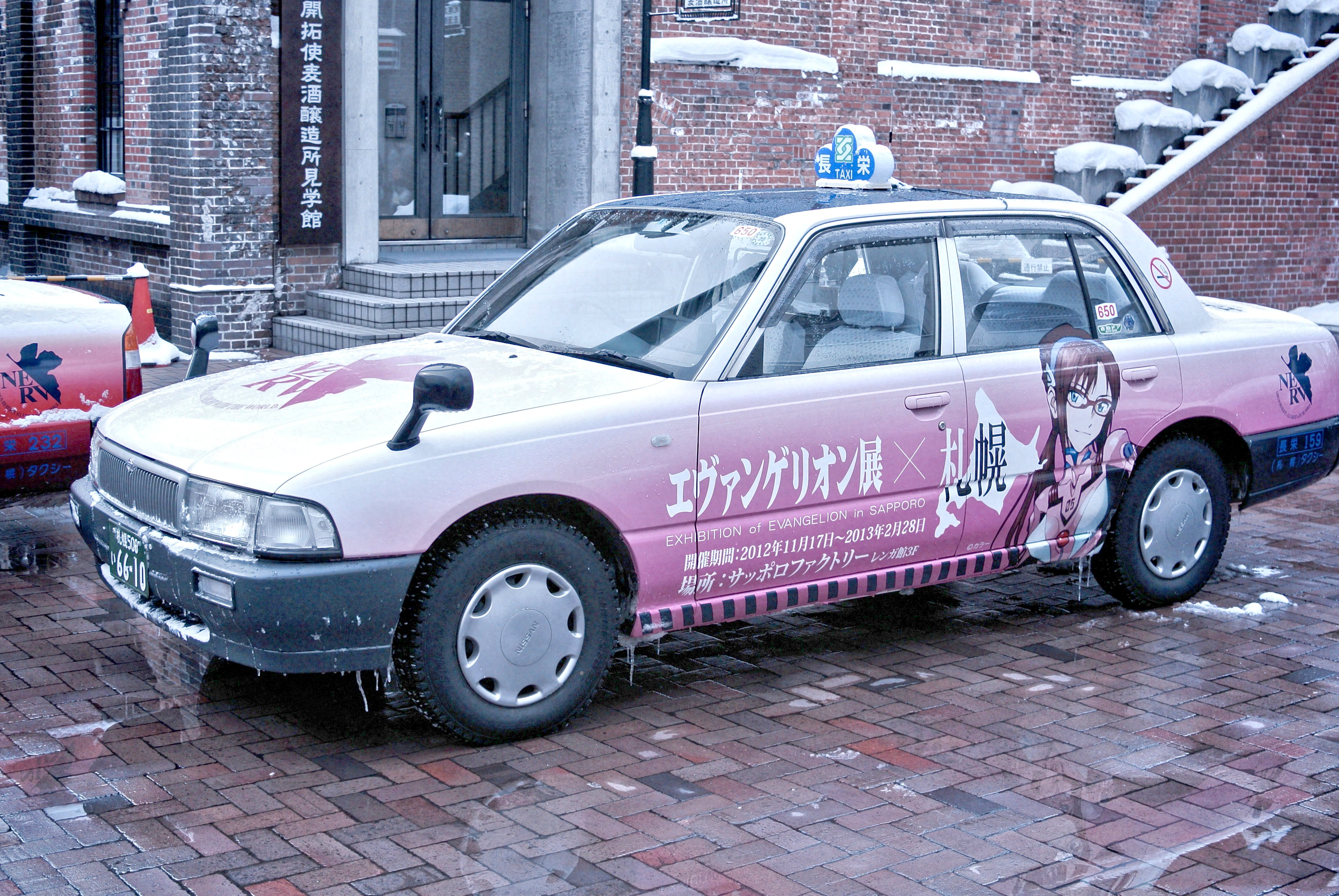
A cab decorated with Mari's picture in Sapporo

Mari has been used for merchandising items, including dolls, action figures, Nendoroids, pins, and a variety of collectible models. Clothing lines and articles of clothing were produced with the character, including sweatshirts, bags, kimonos, jerseys, replica clothing, boots and underwear. Other merchandise included glasses, necklaces, jewellery, lighters, iPhone stickers, coffee, alcohol and other drinks. Mari's glasses were particularly popular.

A life-size reproduction of the character was displayed at Fuji-Q HighLand amusement park in 2011 with other Evangelion-themed installations. Her picture appeared the following year on buses in Hakone, near the series' fictional Tokyo-3. In the same city, Panasonic installed electric-vehicle charging stations in 2013 with her picture and those of other characters from the Rebuild of Evangelion. The interactive attraction "Evangelion The Real 4D" was unveiled in 2016 to commemorate the original series' twentieth anniversary, recreating the battle against the tenth Angel from Mari's point of view. "Evangelion The Flight", a ride with seats covered by a screen showing a sightseeing trip to Mount Fuji guided by Mari, was announced in 2020. For the last chapter of Rebuild, one million copies of two A4 posters of Mari and Kaworu were distributed to Japanese cinemas in June 2021.

Mari, Rei and Asuka became popular cosplay characters. A number of celebrities have cosplayed her, including idol Jurina Matsui, former member of the group AKB48, Airi Shimizu, singer Shoko Nakagawa, First Summer Uika, Tenka Hashimoto, Mea Shimotsuki, Ayana Tsubaki and actress Natsuki Katō. In 2010, in conjunction with the Blu-ray release of You Can (Not) Advance, a cosplayer dressed as Mari appeared at the Animate's store in Tokyo's Akihabara district. The song "365 no march", which Mari hummed in her introductory scene, enjoyed renewed popularity. D.Va's character in Overwatch has been compared to Mari; critics noted that D.Va also owns a pink robot, an armed drone known as Meka. Mari is also referenced in an episode of Wotakoi: Love Is Hard for Otaku.
