= Evangelion: 2.0 You Can (Not) Advance =

2009 Japanese animated film

Evangelion: 2.0 You Can (Not) Advance.
- Theatrical release poster

Japanese name
- Kanji: ヱヴァンゲリヲン新劇場版: 破
- Literal meaning: Evangelion New Theatrical Edition: Break
Transcriptions
- Revised Hepburn: Evangerion Shin Gekijō-ban: Ha
- Directed by: Hideaki Anno; Masayuki; Kazuya Tsurumaki
- Screenplay by: Hideaki Anno
- Based on: Neon Genesis Evangelion by Hideaki Anno
- Starring: Megumi Ogata; Megumi Hayashibara; Yuko Miyamura; Maaya Sakamoto; Fumihiko Tachiki; Kotono Mitsuishi; Kouichi Yamadera
- Cinematography: Toru Fukushi
- Edited by: Hiroshi Okuda
- Music by: Shirō Sagisu
- Production company: Studio Khara
- Distributed by: The KlockWorx; Khara, Inc.
- Release date: June 27, 2009
- Running time: 108 minutes
- Country: Japan
- Language: Japanese
- Box office: $44 million

Evangelion: 2.0 You Can (Not) Advance. (ヱヴァンゲリヲン新劇場版: 破, Evangerion Shin Gekijō-ban: Ha; lit. 'Evangelion New Theatrical Edition: Break') is a 2009 Japanese animated science fiction action film written and chiefly directed by Hideaki Anno. It is the second of a tetralogy of films released in the Rebuild of Evangelion. The tetralogy is based on the original anime series Neon Genesis Evangelion. It was produced by Anno's Studio Khara, in partnership with Gainax.

The film continues the story of Evangelion: 1.0 You Are (Not) Alone, with Shinji Ikari continuing his role as a pilot of one of the gigantic Evangelion as part of NERV's ongoing fight against the mysterious creatures known as Angels. While replicating many scenes and plot elements from the original series, the film also introduces new ones, including newly designed creatures and new characters, such as Mari Illustrious Makinami, and integrates newly available 3D CG technology. Its ending paves the way for the significant storyline departures from the original series in Evangelion: 3.0 You Can (Not) Redo.

== Plot ==
The Third Angel escapes its confinement and tries to break out of NERV's arctic Bethany Base, but Mari Illustrious Makinami, a new pilot, launches Evangelion Provisional Unit-05 and destroys the Angel by self-destructing the EVA and safely ejecting at the last moment.

Meanwhile, Shinji Ikari and his father Gendo visit mother and wife Yui's grave. Shortly after, the Seventh Angel attacks, but is quickly dispatched by the newly arrived Unit-02 and its headstrong pilot, Asuka Langley Shikinami. Ryoji Kaji delivers to Gendo a suitcase containing the mysterious "Key of Nebuchadnezzar" and notes that the destruction of Unit-05 went as planned. Gendo and Kozo Fuyutsuki then visit NERV's lunar compound, Tabgha Base, to view the construction of Evangelion Mark.06, which is noted as being different from the other EVAs. They are denied permission to land, but briefly see Kaworu Nagisa sitting in space without a space suit. During Gendo's absence, the Eighth Angel attacks Tokyo-3. Shinji, Asuka, and Rei kill it in an improvised plan devised by Misato Katsuragi. Both Unit-00 and Unit-01 are damaged. Gendo returns and asks to have them both repaired, but SEELE only allows the repair of Unit-01.

In an attempt to heal the relationship between Gendo and Shinji, Rei prepares a dinner party. At the same time, Mari arrives in Tokyo-3. Later, Unit-04 and NERV's U.S. branch are destroyed during an experiment, prompting the U.S. government to send Unit-03 to Tokyo-3. Due to an international agreement that allows no more than three functioning Evangelions per country at a time, NERV seals away Unit-02; as the test of Unit-03 is scheduled on the same day as Rei's dinner party, Asuka volunteers to take Rei's place as the test pilot to prevent the party from getting cancelled. Once Asuka activates Unit-03, the Ninth Angel possesses the EVA and goes on a rampage. Shinji pilots Unit-01, but refuses to fight the Angel for fear of harming Asuka, who is still trapped inside. Gendo orders the activation of the Dummy System, which makes Unit-01 autonomous, and allows it to savagely destroy Unit-03, crushing the cockpit in its teeth. Emotionally wounded by his father's cold decision, Shinji leaves NERV.

Asuka survives, but is grievously injured and placed in quarantine for fear of mental contamination by the Angel. Shinji heads out of the city, but the Tenth Angel attacks, so he flees to an emergency shelter. Gendo fails to activate Unit-01 without Shinji, so Mari hijacks Unit-02 and heads out to fight the Angel alone. She removes Unit-02's limiters and launches an all-out attack, but the Angel still severely damages Unit-02. Rei joins the fight with the damaged Unit-00 and charges at the Angel with a missile. The missile detonates, but fails to destroy the Angel. The Angel consumes Unit-00 and integrates it with its own body, allowing it to bypass NERV's defenses. Meanwhile, Shinji is rescued by Unit-02.

Upon seeing Rei consumed along with Unit-00, Shinji rushes to Gendo and asks to pilot Unit-01 again. Shinji fends off the Angel, but before he can defeat it, Unit-01 runs out of power and shuts down. Unit-01 reactivates in berserk mode in response to Shinji's rage at the loss of Rei. It easily takes down the Angel, and Shinji uses the EVA to reach inside the Angel's core to save Rei. Unit-01 then starts transcending its physical boundaries to grant Shinji's wish. At the moment Shinji seemingly retrieves Rei, Unit-01 pulls Unit-00's core out of the Angel. As they embrace, Shinji thanks Rei for her attempt to reconcile him with Gendo. She apologizes that it was not realized, but Shinji assures her it was okay. The Angel explodes and its remains, along with Unit-00's core, are absorbed into Unit-01, fusing them all into one being. Unit-01 then sprouts giant wings of light, and Misato, who has been watching the battle, sees that they are identical to the ones she saw during Second Impact. Ritsuko realizes that the EVA has become a divine being, triggering Third Impact and declares this to be the end of the world.

In a post-credits scene, a spear shoots down from the Moon and impales Unit-01 in the middle of its apotheosis, neutralizing it and stopping Third Impact. Kaworu then descends from the Moon in Mark.06, saying that this time, he will show Shinji true happiness.

== Voice cast ==
| Character | Japanese | English | |
| Character | Japanese | Funimation/Okratron 5000 (2011) | Dubbing Brothers/Prime Video (2021) |
|---|---|---|---|
| Shinji Ikari | Megumi Ogata | Spike Spencer | Spike Spencer |
| Misato Katsuragi | Kotono Mitsuishi | Allison Keith | Allison Keith |
| Gendo Ikari | Fumihiko Tachiki | John Swasey | John Swasey |
| Asuka Langley Shikinami | Yūko Miyamura | Tiffany Grant | Tiffany Grant |
| Rei Ayanami | Megumi Hayashibara | Brina Palencia | Amanda Winn-Lee |
| Mari Illustrious Makinami | Maaya Sakamoto | Trina Nishimura | Deneen Melody |
| Ritsuko Akagi | Yuriko Yamaguchi | Colleen Clinkenbeard | Mary Faber |
| Ryoji Kaji | Kōichi Yamadera | J. Michael Tatum | Sean Burgos |
| Kaworu Nagisa | Akira Ishida | Jerry Jewell | Daman Mills |
| Kozo Fuyutsuki | Motomu Kiyokawa | Kent Williams | Michael Ross |
| Maya Ibuki | Miki Nagasawa | Caitlin Glass | Amy Seeley |
| Shigeru Aoba | Takehito Koyasu | Phil Parsons | Jaxon Lee |
| Makoto Hyuga | Hiro Yuuki | Mike McFarland | Joe Fria |
| Toji Suzuhara | Tomokazu Seki | Justin Cook | Brett Weaver |
| Kensuke Aida | Tetsuya Iwanaga | Greg Ayres | Alejandro Saab |
| Hikari Horaki | Junko Iwao | Leah Clark | Kimberly Yates |
| Keel Lorenz | Mugihito | Bill Jenkins | Tom Booker |
| Yui Ikari | Megumi Hayashibara | Stephanie Young | Amanda Winn-Lee |

== Production ==
In September 2006, it was confirmed the second film produced as part of the Rebuild of Evangelion series, with a release date tentatively set for January 2008 and a 90-minute running time. In November 2006, the December edition of the Japanese anime magazine Newtype confirmed the second film was written during post-production on the first film. Anno stated the introduction of new characters and Evangelion units would begin from the second film onwards. The release date was pushed back several times from the original announcement of January 2008: first, to a December 2008 release before an update on the official website on October 6, 2008 announced the official English title and an "early summer 2009" release date. A final postponement revealed that the film would be released on June 27, 2009.

== Music ==
In May 2009, Hikaru Utada returned to the series and provided the theme song for the film, "Beautiful World (Planitb Acoustica Mix)". Utada previously released "Beautiful World" for Evangelion: 1.0 You Are (Not) Alone in 2007. A soundtrack album featuring the film's score by Shirō Sagisu was released on July 8, 2009 in both the regular and special editions. The special edition contains a bonus disc featuring score selections not edited to fit into the film. The film also inserted popular Japanese folk songs, "Tsubasa o Kudasai" and "Kyō no Hi wa Sayōnara", performed by Megumi Hayashibara.

== Release ==
The film's initial teaser trailer, shown after the end credits of Evangelion: 1.0 You Are (Not) Alone in the style of the "next episode" previews in the original TV series, hinted at the adoption of Unit-02 and its pilot Asuka Langley Shikinami and showed scenes inspired by the original series (the disappearance of Unit-04 upon the startup of its S^{2} engine, the possession of Unit-03 by Bardiel, Evangelion Units 01 and 02 fighting Zeruel) as well as new material (the newly designed Units 05 and 06 and the unintroduced new character of Mari Makinami). A full trailer was released on April 2, 2009. The character Makinami Mari Illustrious, teased in the teaser trailer and appearing in the Nintendo DS game Petit Eva: Evangelion@Game (ぷちえゔぁ～EVANGELION@GAME～, Puchi Eva ~Evangelion@Game~) as a character picture prize with the name of Mari (マリ) and the simple description of "Mysterious girl", was introduced in the April 18 EVA-EXTRA01 paper magazine by her full name, following the Evangelion naval naming convention, with Maaya Sakamoto as her voice actress. Similarly, theatrical posters revealed that the character Asuka's family name would be changed from Sohryu to Shikinami.

Evangelion 2.0 made its International/US premiere at the Hawaii International Film Festival on October 24, 2009. The film made its Canadian premiere at Waterloo Festival for Animated Cinema on November 21, 2009. On December 3, 2009, the film was released in Hong Kong and South Korea. In Australia, the film made its premiere at the Reel Anime Festival in September 2010. The film premiered in Ireland on March 20, 2010 as a part of the Irish Film Institute Anime Weekend. The film screened on July 10, 2010 as a part of the Fantasia Film Festival in Montreal. The film made its European premiere at Lucca Comics & Games 2009 on November 1, 2009 and was screened at the Asia Filmfest in Munich on November 6, 2009. Despite former announcements, Evangelion: 2.0 You Can (Not) Advance was not screened at the Animotion festival in Bonn because of licensing problems. The film also competed in the Sitges Film Festival in Catalonia, Spain on October 4, 2009 in the Anima't category. In North America, Cinema Asia Releasing, Eleven Arts and Funimation announced that Evangelion: 2.0 You Can (Not) Advance would premiere in the United States in January 2011. It was originally planned to premiere in 70–100 theaters. However, Funimation released a statement in December 2010 confirming that it would be released in 22 theatres.

- Singapore: November 12, 2009 at The Cathay/The Picturehouse.
- South Korea: December 3, 2009.
- Hong Kong: December 3, 2009.
- Malaysia: March 4, 2010 at The Cathay Cineplex e@Curve and TGV at Sunway (after fans' petition in the forum and Facebook).
- Belgium: Anima: Brussels Animation Film Festival 2010. February 13 and 20, 2010.
- United Kingdom: Glasgow Film Festival on February 15, 2010 at 5:45pm.
- Estonia: 4.JAFF (Japanese Animation Film Festival) in Tallinn and Tartu on April 4, 2010
- Indonesia: screening nationwide, beginning from July 16, 2010, only at Blitz Megaplex theaters. Distribution rights held by Pratama Film.

Evangelion 2.0 was broadcast on Nippon TV on August 26, 2011 under the name Evangelion 2.02. Simultaneously, the TV edition was played in 5 Japanese theaters; the TV broadcast of 2.0 received higher ratings than did 1.0. At the end of the broadcast, a trailer for Evangelion 3.0 was included, with an official release date of Fall 2012.

=== Home media ===
The DVD and Blu-ray release in Japan took place on May 26, 2010; unlike the 2 DVD versions of 1.0, it was released as 2.22 with "readjustments". Universum Film's German release was on September 17, 2010. The Japanese release set an Amazon.co.jp record for pre-orders, with more than 88,000, and ultimately over 800,000 pre-orders in general; upon release, it set first-day sales records (124,000 DVDs and 195,000 Blu-ray discs), topping Blu-ray sales for 4 weeks.

At Otakon 2010, North American anime distributor Funimation announced that they had licensed Evangelion 2.0 and would plan a theatrical release followed by a DVD and Blu-ray release on April 5, 2011. The release date was later brought forward to March 29, 2011 for the United States, but the original release date was retained for Canada. The film grossed over $7.6 million in DVD and Blu-ray sales in the United States.

In May 2010, British anime distributor Manga Entertainment had announced plans to release Evangelion 2.0 in the U.K. and were waiting on Funimation to announce production dates; in December 2010, the release dates for the Blu-ray and DVD of 2.22 were announced to be June 2011. Later, the date was changed for an early release on May 30, but then finally pushed back to the original month, on June 20. Australian distributor Madman Entertainment released Evangelion 2.22 on Blu-ray and DVD on June 15, 2011 under exclusive license from NTV & Manga Entertainment. This time, Madman's DVD included all special features on the one disc, unlike its DVD release of 1.11, which came with one disc (whereas the North American DVD releases of both movies have two discs) and missing some special features (the Blu-ray came with all intact).

In 2021, Amazon Studios acquired the streaming rights to all of the Rebuild of Evangelion films. The 2.22 version of the film became available on the streaming service on August 13, 2021. It featured full re-dubbings of all Rebuild films, including several voice actors from the A.D. Vision and Manga Entertainment localizations of the original series and films, in place of the mostly new cast used in the Funimation adaptations of the Rebuild series and Netflix's adaptation of the series. Like Netflix's release, it also included a full re-translation by Khara's in-house translator, Dan Kanemitsu.

=== Merchandise ===
Character designer Yoshiyuki Sadamoto designed three Be@rbrick figures of Asuka, Rei, and Mari, which went on sale on March 14, 2009 and were also available as a bundle with advance film ticket purchases. NTT DoCoMo and Sharp released a production model of the "SH-06A NERV" phone featured in the film, which Hideaki Anno and Studio Khara supervised in designing. The phone, only available in Japan between June and July 2009, was originally set for 20,000 pre-order units and 10,000 for retail sales. After selling out all pre-orders in only five hours, NTT docomo announced they would be manufacturing an additional 7,500 units to meet all orders. In August 2009, ABC-Mart, King Records, and Achilles released sneakers based on the design of Evangelion Unit-01 as part of "The Footstep Instrumentality Project." Ueshima Coffee Co., as with Evangelion: 1.0 You Are (Not) Alone, released coffee cans decorated with Evangelion characters and their Evangelion units. Medicom released "Real Action Heroes" action figures of Shinji, Rei, Asuka, and Kaworu in restyled plugsuits in August, September, and November 2009 and May 2010, while Bandai released its own line of action figures with Mari Illustrious Makinami and two separate sets of Gashapon figures in May and July 2009. Bandai also released several action figures from their Robot Damashii line of Unit-00 (Tamashii exclusive), Unit-01 (regular and night combat version) Unit-02 (regular and beast mode), and Unit-03. Lawson released Asuka, Rei, and Pen^{2} PuchiEva figures to be sold with advance ticket purchases. Revoltech introduced several other action figures, including Unit-01 (normal and berserker modes), Unit-02, and Unit-05 (normal and repainted) as well as special exclusives available from magazine inserts (Unit-03) and 7-Elevens (Unit-00). The 320-page art book for 2.0, Groundwork of Evangelion 2.0, was released May 28, 2011 for ¥3,675.

== Reception ==
=== Box office ===
In its opening weekend in Japan, the film reached number-one at the box office with a revenue of ¥510 million. The film subsequently grossed ¥4 billion ($43 million) at the Japanese box office in 2009, making it the year's second highest-grossing anime film. A 2020 Japan re-release grossed $433,850, totaling $43,433,850 grossed in Japan.

The film's North American box office take was over $130,000, an improvement over 1.0. The film grossed $858,409 overseas by 2011, and a further $47,103 in Australia and New Zealand in 2017, for an overseas total of $905,512, bringing the film's worldwide box office gross to $44,339,362.

=== Critical response ===
On Rotten Tomatoes, Evangelion 2.0 has an 82% with an average score of 6.4/10, based on 11 reviews. On Metacritic, the movie has a score of 46 based on 5 reviews, indicating "mixed or average reviews".

Justin Sevakis of Anime News Network praised the new character interactions and development, stating "Evangelion 2.0 feels as though the project has been put on mood stabilizers: it's not any happier, but it's more stable and certainly more focused. And in the end, it's a vast improvement." Reviewing the US Blu-ray release for ANN, Theron Martin wrote that 2.0's Asuka is "distinct from the get-go, too, as she is less bratty and more aggressively antisocial than the first one. She may have initially seemed to be the most socially adjusted Eva pilot in the TV series, but here she makes no pretenses about liking anyone – not even Kaji, whom she hopelessly mooned over in the TV series but doesn't give a second thought here – and seems motivated as much by establishing herself in a future career path in NERV as she is by her personal pride" and praised Anno's technique where "the peak moments of the most gruesome [scene] are set to a gentle, vocalized children's song which, paradoxically, makes the scenes all the more horrific."

Mania.com reviewer Chris Beveridge wrote that "watching the second installment of Evangelion is more rewarding and more difficult than the first. It's more rewarding because you're seeing this interpretation taking on its own life fully, from the way Asuka is introduced, the new character of Mari and the larger scope of how the world works with Evangelion units ... They go big here with a lot of changes, changes that could annoy and irk the faithful, but it's an interpretation that is doing something different at this point and it does it well, giving it all the kind of smoothness it needs, even if it does feel rushed sometimes when there are so many Angel fights throughout it." Many reviews praised the action scenes (the Boston Globe criticizing their aesthetic as "exhausting"); The Toronto Star writes: "Sparing no time to get newbies up to speed, Evangelion 2.0 will undoubtedly confound some viewers with its jam-packed narrative and jargon-heavy dialogue but the intricately designed, hyper-kinetic visuals more than compensate, especially when seen at the scale they deserve." The Chicago Sun-Times likewise praised the action, but criticized the soundtrack for being "a weird array of elevator-style music."

The Kansas City Star's reviewer wrote "The peripheral characters are hard to keep track of, and a medieval theologian would be weirded out by all the mystical gibberish", but also praised the "terrific battle scenes and gorgeous animation. Those elements don't compensate for every shortcoming, but they make a challenging genre much easier for novices to enjoy." NAW: "Having introduced Mari so vividly, though, the film forgets about her for about 40 minutes....She doesn't reappear until halfway through the film. And her purpose remains elusive." Fort Worth Weekly's reviewer, on the other hand, praised the mystical gibberish and otaku references: "this movie trafficks in Judeo-Christian symbolism and references that often lean toward the obscure. This, along with its meta-commentary on anime itself and the ways its fans relate to it, helps set the movie apart from its fellows."

=== Accolades ===
The film won first place in the Animation category of the French Lyon Asian Film Festival, narrowly beating Symphony in August in an audience vote. It won the award for Excellent Animation of the Year by being nominated for the Japan Academy Prize for Animation of the Year in 2010. Stills and draft materials from 2.0 by Hideaki Anno were exhibited at Künstlerhaus Bethanien in Germany as part of the Proto Anime Cut exhibition in January–March 2011, with a European tour planned in summer 2012.

== Sequel ==
The next film in the series, Evangelion: 3.0 You Can (Not) Redo, was previewed in a post-credits trailer, continuing the story with Shinji and Rei still frozen within Unit-01, Tokyo-3 and the Geofront being abandoned, "NERV personnel [being] held in confinement," "Eva Mark-06 descend[ing] on Dogma," "the quickening Eva Unit-08 and its pilot," and the assembling of "the children chosen by fate." The film was released in Japan on November 17, 2012, but with a radically different plotline compared to the one teased in the preview. It was released on Blu-ray and DVD in Japan on April 24, 2013 with the title Evangelion: 3.33 You Can (Not) Redo. On June 12, 2021, the final film of the tetralogy, Evangelion: 3.0+1.0 Thrice Upon a Time, received a re-release called 3.0+1.01, that included a prequel manga set during the events 3.0 called Evangelion 3.0 (-120 min.), written by co-director Kazuya Tsurumaki at Hideaki Anno's initiative.
