= Neon Genesis Evangelion: Anima =

Light novel based on Neon Genesis Evangelion

- Cover of the first English novel volume

エヴァンゲリオン ANIMA (Evangerion ANIMA)
- Created by: Khara
- Light novel
- Written by: Takuma Kageyama (2008); Ikuto Yamashita (2009–13)
- Illustrated by: Ikuto Yamashita
- Published by: Kadokawa Shoten
- English publisher: NA: Seven Seas Entertainment
- Magazine: Dengeki Hobby
- Original run: January 2008 – January 2013
- Volumes: 5

Neon Genesis Evangelion: Anima (Japanese: エヴァンゲリオン ANIMA, Hepburn: Evangerion ANIMA), shortened as Evangelion Anima, and formerly Neon Genesis Evangelion (3 Years After) -Anima-, is a Japanese light novel series written by Takuma Kageyama and later by Ikuto Yamashita, based on the Neon Genesis Evangelion series created by Khara. It was originally serialized in Kadokawa Shoten's Dengeki Hobby Magazine from January 2008 to January 2013. It was later republished into 5 tankōbon volumes from 2017 to 2019. Set in an alternate timeline three years after the events of the original Evangelion anime series, it focuses on the events where Shinji Ikari manages to avert the success of the Human Instrumentality Project, the culmination of the plot of the original series. Seven Seas Entertainment licensed the novels series for an English release from 2019 to 2021.

== Plot ==
Anima is set into an alternative future, three years after the events of Neon Genesis Evangelion are cut short by Shinji managing to avert Seele's plans as they'd take place in The End of Evangelion. It portrays a conflict between a reformed Nerv agency and Seele, now denounced as a rogue organization, still attempting to enact the Human Instrumentality Project. There are several new variations and upgrades of the Evangelion units fighting for both sides, including a mysterious, monstrously powerful autonomous Evangelion unit called Armaros.

Shinji is now taller and has long hair which he uses as a ponytail. He has matured a great deal, and is now the de facto leader of the Eva Team. Asuka is a much more cheerful and happy self, having overcome her childhood trauma, and is now much closer to Shinji, though she maintains some distance from Rei. Rei is referred to as a "No. Trois", in reference to her being the third Rei to appear in the series. She looks much more like her genetic donor Yui Ikari. There are also three more Rei clones present in the story, as Rei "No. Quatre", "No. Cinq" and "No. Six". Toji Suzuhara now has cybernetic limbs. He is closer with Hikari Horaki, who is no longer class representative. Mari Makinami is also present as a six-year old. Shinji's father Gendo Ikari was absorbed by a mysterious black barrier released by Lilith when Instrumentality was stopped, and his status is currently unknown. In his stead, Misato Katsuragi took over as Acting Commander of Nerv. Ryoji Kaji is not confirmed dead, and was instead kidnapped.

== Release ==
Anima was originally released in the Dengeki Hobby Magazine from 2007 to 2013. In 2017, to commemorate the series' 10th anniversary, Anima received a full print volume release, split into five books, by Kadokawa Shoten. The first two books were released simultaneously in Japan on November 30, 2017, and the last two were released on March 30, 2019. On January 11, 2019, Seven Seas Entertainment announced an English release, with the first released on August 22, 2019, digitally and on October 29 physically, and the last released on June 24, 2021, digitally and August 3 physically. There is also a "visual book" containing artwork and information for the series. On December 4, 2023, Seven Seas also announced an audiobook adaptation of ANIMA, narrated by Asuka's ADV/Amazon English voice actress Tiffany Grant.

== Reception ==
Right Stuf called Anima a "wild ride" and appreciated seeing the pilots interact as normal teenagers, but noted that it was "lacking the heart and realism of the original television series". Honey's Anime expressed a similar opinion: "It was amazing to witness the characters we've grown to love interacting with each other like the rest of us."
