= Neon Genesis Evangelion: Campus Apocalypse =

Manga based on the Neon Genesis Evangelion franchise

- Cover to the first Volume

新世紀エヴァンゲリオン 学園堕天録 (Shin Seiki Evangelion Gakuen Datenroku)
- Genre: Mystery, science fiction, thriller
- Created by: Gainax; Khara
- Manga
- Written by: Ming Ming
- Published by: Kadokawa Shoten
- English publisher: NA: Dark Horse Comics
- Magazine: Asuka
- Original run: October 2007 – December 2009
- Volumes: 4

Neon Genesis Evangelion: Campus Apocalypse (新世紀エヴァンゲリオン 学園堕天録, Shin Seiki Evangerion Gakuen Datenroku; lit. Neon Genesis Evangelion: Academic Record of Heaven's Descent) is a Japanese manga series written and illustrated by Ming Ming based on the Neon Genesis Evangelion franchise. It was serialized in the shōjo manga magazine Monthly Asuka between 2007 and 2009, published by Kadokawa Shoten, and is also available in the PlayStation Store. It has been collected in four volumes.

Many of the main characters from Neon Genesis Evangelion return, including Shinji Ikari, Rei Ayanami, Kaworu Nagisa, Asuka Langley Soryu, Toji Suzuhara, Misato Katsuragi, and Kensuke Aida. Despite using the same characters, story, and setting, it differs from the Neon Genesis Evangelion manga.

Since August 2010, an official English translation of the series has been published by Dark Horse Comics.

== Plot ==
Shinji Ikari is a boy who attends the NERV Foundation Academy and lives a relatively boring but peaceful life. During a typical outing at night to a nearby vending machine, he witnesses Rei Ayanami and another boy he has never seen before fleeing from the scene of a violent explosion. While startled by the incident, he finds an unusual gem.

The next day, he meets Kaworu Nagisa, a transfer student to the NERV Foundation Academy who is the boy Shinji had seen the previous night. When Shinji tries to discover the truth behind Rei's relationship with Kaworu, he soon finds himself forcibly recruited to assist them and Asuka Langley Soryu in fighting against Angels. The Angels are beings who wish to destroy humanity by obtaining "Cores", one of which is the gem that Shinji found.

Shinji soon receives an "EVA", the manifestation of the most powerful form of his will, to combat the Angels. While accompanying the group on their nightly city patrols and investigating strange phenomena, Shinji must protect civilians who are disappearing, though in reality have been killed by Angels and used as vessels, and conceal the truth from his friends.

== Characters ==
Shinji Ikari
The protagonist, Shinji lives a relatively peaceful but boring life attending a local Catholic school. His mother died when he was a child and his father works abroad, so his legal guardian is Kaji, one of his father's former subordinates. He finds his life changed forever when he becomes involved with Rei Ayanami and Kaworu Nagisa in hunting down and capturing Angels. He apparently has mysterious powers, which allow him to drive off Ramiel, the first Angel he encounters. His Eva weapon manifests as a gun. Shinji appears to have a crush on Rei, but also develops a strong, almost intimate, friendship with Kaworu, as they care greatly for each other's well-being.
Rei Ayanami
A beautiful, but distant girl who Toji describes as classy, but gloomy, and whom Shinji admires. Most people in the class consider her to be an oddball, though she is exceptionally talented at anything she is told to do, especially if Asuka tells her that it is a "mission". Rei leads a secret life working as a Shamash Guardian for a group hidden in the school to fight against Angels. She wields the Lance of Longinus in combat. Chapter Eight reveals that she is an "artificially created child", meaning that she has no parents and has spent most of her life in a facility.
Kaworu Nagisa
A transfer student who takes an interest in Shinji, who is suspicious of his relationship with Rei. Kaworu secretly fights against Angels and has the ability to generate an AT Field, and his Eva weapon manifests as a sword. He uses the name Tabris to play online games. Chapter Eight reveals that he is an "artificially created child" and has spent most of his life in facilities. He is ignorant of many social customs, and considers himself to be close friends with Shinji, although the nature of their relationship is left ambiguous.
Asuka Langley Soryu
A girl whom the children in Shinji's class consider to be an attractive and stylish foreign student. She is also involved with the Shamash Guardians fighting against Angels, and appears to be on relatively good terms with Kaworu and Rei. She is apparently outspoken and has little patience for novices like Shinji, though does not act like this around her classmates. Asuka wields a whip when fighting against Angels and is proud of her abilities. Chapter Eight reveals that she is the only one out of the three (Kaworu, Rei, and herself) who has parents, and was enrolled in school prior to being assigned as a Shamash Guardian.
Toji Suzuhara, Kensuke Aida, and Hikari Horaki
Toji and Kensuke are Shinji's friends. Kensuke is a conspiracy fanatic and claims to have knowledge about supposed prophecies involving Angels and the destruction of the world, but Toji is skeptical of these claims. They take an interest in the girls in the class, commenting on both Rei and Asuka, and enjoy playing MMORPGs. Hikari is the class representative of Shinji's class. Kensuke is later controlled by Iruel into freeing her from the computer, which he succeeds at in Chapter 14.
Misato Katsuragi, Ritsuko Akagi, and Kōzō Fuyutsuki
Misato is Shinji's class teacher. She and Kaji are old acquaintances, though Misato appears to have a negative opinion of him. Before becoming a teacher, she worked in the same facilities as Kaji. Ritsuko works as a nurse at Shinji's school and appears to be aware of Rei's activities involving the Angels, and treats her and Shinji after their first fight with Ramiel. However, Ritsuko's actual loyalties may not lie with NERV, as Kaworu remarks upon when he comes to see her. Fuyutsuki is mentioned in Chapter 11 as the vice-principal of NERV Academy, and one of the teachers who is aware of the Angels' existence.
Makoto Hyuga, Maya Ibuki, and Shigeru Aoba
They are mentioned in Chapter 11 as teachers at NERV Academy who are aware of the Angels' existence. Hyuga is the current events teacher, Ibuki is the mathematics teacher, and Aoba is the chemistry teacher.
Kaede Agano, Satsuki Ooi, and Aoi Mogami
They appear in Chapter 11 and appear to be teachers at the school. When they are introduced, they are all dressed as nuns.
Ryoji Kaji
Shinji's guardian, a journalist and photographer who was once a subordinate of Shinji's father Gendo. He appears to recognize Kaworu Nagisa upon their first meeting, and also has ties to Misato. He disapproves of Shinji's nightly walks, particularly in light of recent civilian disappearances.
Gendo Ikari
Shinji's father and the commander of NERV. He is introduced at the end of Chapter 11, much to Shinji's shock, since he had believed he was dead. Kaji believed that Gendo had died in a past incident when he was working under him. However, Kaji learned his former superior was alive when Gendo requested that he act as Shinji's legal guardian while he attends school. He is cold and to the point, though Shinji remarks that he was not like this in the past, and is apparently fixated on the circumstances behind the death of his wife, Yui Ikari.
The ANGELS
Beings which have appeared to claim "Cores" and destroy humanity. Originally supporting devices for Yggdrasil, the Angels refuse to accept their fate and escape. They express that their motives are only to live in peace, even if it means Yggdrasil withers and all realities are converged as a result. The Angels possess no real bodies of their own, consisting only of a consciousness, and must find vessels to inhabit and move between.
- Ramiel
The first angel to appear in the series, Ramiel kills and possesses the body of a man to take the Core Shinji has obtained. He has the ability to generate lightning and transforms the body he possesses to gain wings. Though he overpowers Rei and then Kaworu, who was inhibited because he was protecting Shinji, Shinji's powers suddenly awaken and drive Ramiel away. Soon after, he possesses a young woman and approaches Shinji again with the intent of discovering the Cores' location. Asuka and Shinji eventually defeat Ramiel, and Kaworu removes his core from his host.
- Shamshel
First appearing in Chapter 10, Shamshel takes the form of a teenage girl. She addresses a fellow, yet-unnamed Angel as "brother" and appears to enjoy teasing him.
- Iruel
First appearing in Chapter 10, Ireul appears on a series of screens, possibly as a computer program. Its gender is not specified, but it appears to take on the form of an androgynous being wearing a mask with three reptilian eyes; two on either side of it and one in the center. It is confirmed in Chapter 14 that Iruel has taken on a female form upon escaping from its prison.
- Leliel
First appearing in Chapter 17, Leliel possesses a young man with pale hair and infiltrates the school while Iruel was battling against Shinji and Asuka. He finds and kills an unnamed person from the school before attempting to kill Toji and Hikari. However, his core is removed by Israfel, one of their halves, then chides him for involving innocent humans and states he can remain in that form for a while.
- Israfel
Unlike the other Angels, Israfel is incarnated as the humans Cecilia and Makoto de Nuovo, Japanese-Italian twin siblings who are talented singers and debut in Chapter 5. While Makoto is aware of their Angel heritage, Cecilia has no memory of her true identity despite assuming Angel form during a full moon. As a result, Cecilia is mostly naive to the goals of the other Angels and falls in love with Shinji, which Makoto worries might kill her. Despite being angels, the twins refuse to harm innocent humans, even meddling in Iruel's affairs and defeating Leliel. Makoto later arranges for himself and Cecilia to leave Japan and return to Italy with their mother. While Makoto intended for his sister to not become a victim in the crossfire of the final series of battles, he assures Cecilia that they will see Shinji again someday.
- Other Angels
While they are unseen, chapter 10 has a yet-unnamed Angel in the form of a man calling himself "Mimori" who works for the game company GNX.

== Releases ==
No.	Original release date	Original ISBN	English release date	English ISBN
1	March 26, 2008	978-4-04-854157-2	September 1, 2010	978-1-59582-530-8
Stages I-IV
Shinji Ikari is a school boy at NERV Catholic School along with Asuka and Rei. After seeing Rei meet with the mysterious Kaworu in an alley way one night, Shinji is exposed to the realities of angels, receives his EVA, and joins with Rei, Kaworu and Asuka in their mission to fight them.
2	October 25, 2008	978-4-04-854210-4	January 26, 2011	978-1-59582-661-9
Stages V-X
3	March 26, 2009	978-4-04-854302-6	March 30, 2011	978-1-59582-680-0
Stages XI-XVI
4	December 26, 2009	978-4-04-854407-8	June 22, 2011	978-1-59582-689-3
Stages XVII-XXI; Final Stage
Gendo Ikari reveals his true intent is to bring back whatever version of Yui he can. Rei refuses to become the spare and so Gendo shoots her, saying as he does that he can now use Shinji as an alternative. Kaworu tells the other characters of his angel status, but falls victim to Nerv's new anti-angel weapon. However he manages to recover sufficiently to (with Asuka's help) rescue Shinji from Gendo's plan. In the coma-induced scene witnessed by Shinji, Kaworu states that it was Shinji who made him "not want to destroy mankind." The story ends with Rei, Asuka and Shinji returning to school.
	—	—	April 13, 2016	978-1-59582-680-0
Complete (OMNIBUS)
