= Ikuto Yamashita =

Japanese manga artist (born 1965)

Ikuto Yamashita (山下 いくと, Yamashita Ikuto; born August 23, 1965) is a Japanese manga artist and designer from Gifu Prefecture. He is currently based in and continuing to live in Gifu Prefecture.

== Overview ==
Yamashita was born in the Gifu Prefecture and is a graduate of the Nagoya University of Arts. His representative work in manga is "Dark Whisper" (serialized in Dengeki Daioh). In the field of anime, he is the mecha designer for the Neon Genesis Evangelion series (along with Hideaki Anno) and Sentō Yōsei Yukikaze. The designs for Yukikaze were originally drawn as recreation, as well as Sentō Yōsei Shōjo tasuke te! Mave-chan.

Besides Evangelion, he has also done mecha designs for other Gainax works including Gunbuster and Nadia: The Secret of Blue Water. He was also the mechanical designer for Blue Submarine No. 6. and the video game Metaphor: ReFantazio.
