= Neon Genesis Evangelion (franchise) =

Japanese media franchise

Neon Genesis Evangelion (新世紀エヴァンゲリオン)
- Created by: Hideaki Anno
- Owners: Gainax (1994–2006); Khara (2006–present)
- Years: 1994–present

Print publications
- Graphic novels: List of chapters

Films and television
- Films: List of movies
- Animated series: Neon Genesis Evangelion

Games
- Video games: List of video games

Audio
- Original music: List of music

Miscellaneous
- Character(s): List of characters

Official website
- www.evangelion.co.jp

Neon Genesis Evangelion (新世紀エヴァンゲリオン, Shin Seiki Evangerion; IPA: [ɕin seː.ki e.βaŋ.ge.ɾi.oɴ]) is a Japanese media franchise created by Hideaki Anno, originally owned by Gainax and currently owned by Khara. Most of the franchise features an apocalyptic mecha action story, which revolves around the paramilitary organization NERV and their efforts in fighting hostile beings called Angels, using giant humanoids called Evangelions (or EVAs for short) that are piloted by select teenagers. Subsequent works deviate from this theme to varying degrees, focusing more on romantic interactions between the characters, plotlines not present in the original works, and reimaginings of the conflicts from the original works.

The Neon Genesis Evangelion manga debuted in Shōnen Ace in December 1994, to generate interest in the upcoming anime release. The Neon Genesis Evangelion anime was written and directed by Hideaki Anno, originally airing from October 1995 until March 1996. The anime is widely considered to have been groundbreaking in its exploration of religious, psychological, and philosophical themes, while initially appearing to be a standard mecha series. The ending of the series was controversial; in response to this controversy, two films offered an alternate ending for the show: Neon Genesis Evangelion: Death & Rebirth, released in March 1997, and The End of Evangelion released in July 1997. Death is a 60-minute compilation of parts from the first 24 episodes of the TV series, with some new footage added in order to prepare for Rebirth, which contains the last two episodes and the first 30 minutes of End of Evangelion.

The popularity of the show spawned numerous additional media, including video games, radio dramas, audio books, a light novel series, pachinko machines, and a tetralogy of films titled Rebuild of Evangelion. Other derivative works include Angelic Days, Petit Eva: Evangelion@School and Shinji Ikari Raising Project.

== Setting ==
Works within the Neon Genesis Evangelion franchise typically have the same setting, characters, and themes, but can vary in their portrayal of the different storylines with alternate re-tellings of the original anime. Many later works, such as Death & Rebirth and The Rebuild of Evangelion, diverge greatly from the original anime. Evangelion's fictional setting takes place after the Second Impact, a cataclysmic explosion in Antarctica in the year 2000, which killed billions of people and threw the Earth off its axis. Fifteen years after the Second Impact, a group of mysterious beings referred to as "Angels" begin appearing and pose a worldwide and existential threat to what remains of mankind. The NERV organization, a paramilitary special agency recruited and controlled by the UN, is tasked with defeating the Angels, with the use of giant mechanical warriors known as "Evangelions". A select group of children pilot the Evangelions, with focus put on Shinji Ikari, Rei Ayanami and Asuka Langley Soryu. As the story progresses, it delves into philosophical and psychological themes such as identity, trauma, and the nature of existence. The relationships between the characters are also explored, particularly between Shinji, Asuka, and Rei, as they navigate their complex and sometimes contentious dynamics. The backdrop of Neon Genesis Evangelion slowly reveals the true nature of Rei Ayanami, the Evangelions, the Angels, the NERV organization and a group known as SEELE. The series incorporates religious themes, including Christianity and Kabbalah and Adam, Lilith and the Dead Sea Scrolls. The series is well known for its psychoanalysis of the characters and features the theories of famous psychologists like Jung and Freud. This is most heavily covered in the implementation of the Human Instrumentality Project, the secret goal of NERV and SEELE, whose result varies across different media, including the original anime, films, manga and video games.

== Anime ==
=== Neon Genesis Evangelion ===
Neon Genesis Evangelion, also known simply as Evangelion or Eva, is a Japanese mecha anime television series animated by Tatsunoko, produced by Gainax, directed by Hideaki Anno and broadcast on TV Tokyo from October 1995 to March 1996. It was the first installation in the franchise, and also the second of Gainax's works to reach such acclaim, the earlier being Nadia: The Secret of Blue Water. Evangelion is set fifteen years after a worldwide cataclysm named Second Impact, particularly in the futuristic fortified city of Tokyo-3. The protagonist is Shinji Ikari, a teenage boy who is recruited by his father Gendo to the shadowy organization NERV to pilot a giant bio-machine mecha named Evangelion into combat against beings known as Angels.

The series explores the experiences and emotions of Evangelion pilots and members of Nerv as they try to prevent Angels from causing more cataclysms. In the process, they are called upon to understand the ultimate causes of events and the motives for human action. The series has been described as a deconstruction of the mecha genre and it features archetypal imagery derived from Shinto cosmology as well as Jewish and Christian mystical traditions, including Midrashic tales and Kabbalah. The psychoanalytic accounts of human behavior put forward by Freud and Jung are also prominently featured. Neon Genesis Evangelion was awarded The Excellence Award at the Japan Media Arts-festival in 1997. The word "controversial" shows up almost continuously in reviews of the series, together with "complex". Critics saw Evangelion very positively, with its stylised and thematic characteristics.

=== Neon Genesis Evangelion: Death & Rebirth ===
Neon Genesis Evangelion: Death & Rebirth, is a 1997 Japanese animated science fiction psychological drama film and the first installment of the Neon Genesis Evangelion feature film project and consists of two parts. The project, whose overarching title translates literally to New Century Gospel: The Movie, was released in response to the success of the TV series and a strong demand by fans for an alternate ending. Its components have since been re-edited and re-released several times.

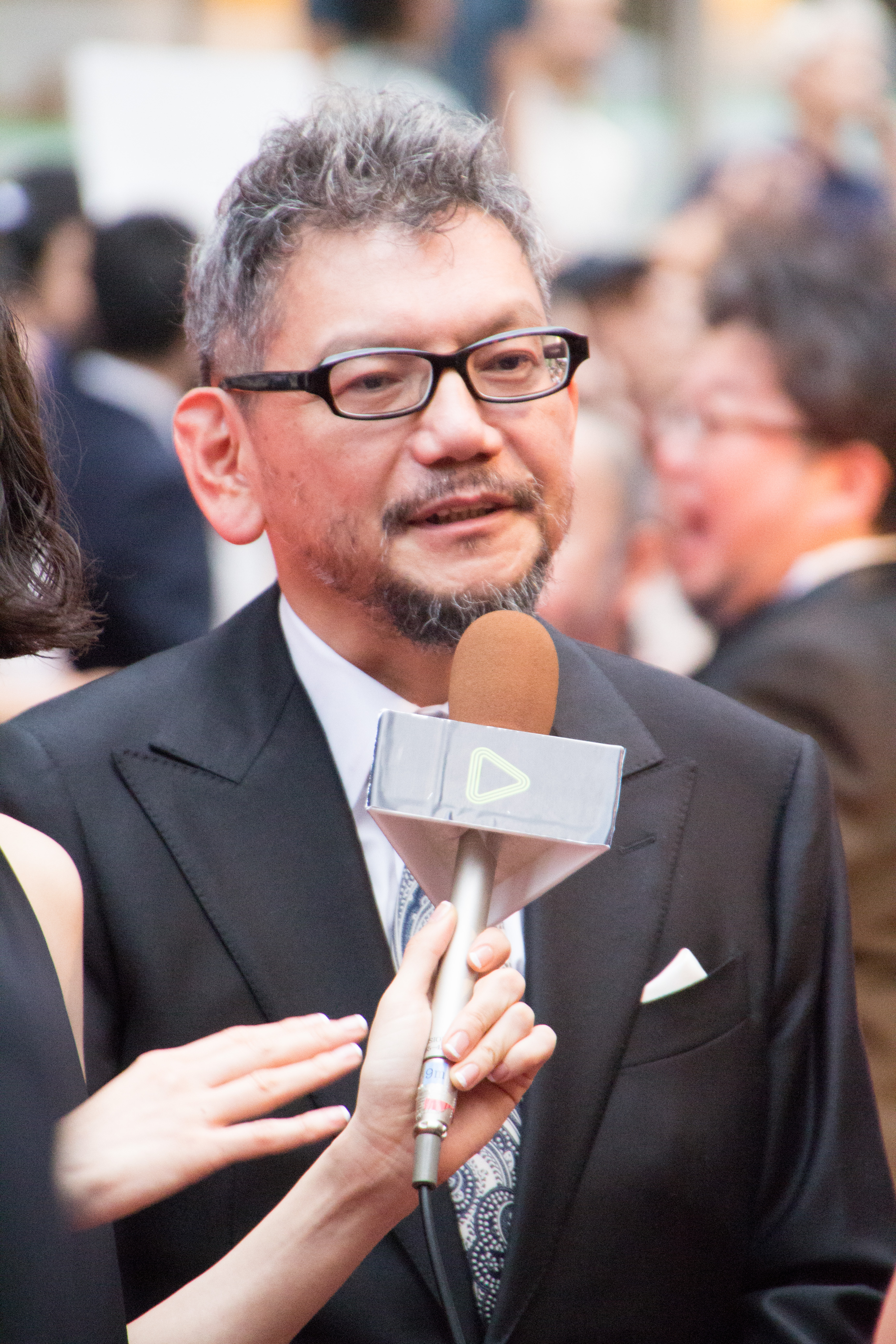
Hideaki Anno, creator of the original series and co-founder of Gainax at the World Premiere of Shin Godzilla

Death is a sixty-minute summary of the first twenty-four parts of Neon Genesis Evangelion. New scenes were added, which were later added to the series itself in its "Director's Cut". The purpose of Death is to set the stage for Rebirth, which is a re-made version of the series' last two parts. Death was reworked twice: once as Death(true), in which the new scenes were removed after they had been added to the series and shown without Rebirth, then another version was released, Death(true)^{2}, in which Adam's embryo was added to Gendo's hand (later incorporated into The End of Evangelion) and various cuts were made to the film. Death(true)^{2} is the version included in Revival of Evangelion, the final version of the films. and the first half of an unfinished new ending, titled Rebirth, a retelling of episodes 25 and 26 of the television series as the events of the Human Instrumentality Project unfold from an external point of view.

=== The End of Evangelion ===
The End of Evangelion, released on July 19, 1997, is the completed version of Rebirth, an alternate version of the final episodes of the television series. SEELE attacks NERV, using their Mass Production Evangelion units, all in an attempt to complete the Human Instrumentality Project and initiate the Third Impact. It was written by Hideaki Anno, directed by Anno and Kazuya Tsurumaki, and animated by Gainax and Production I.G. It serves as an alternate ending to the television series, as the earlier mentioned episodes were quite controversial.

The story follows Shinji Ikari, Rei Ayanami and Asuka Langley Soryu, the pilots of the Evangelions during the beginning of the Third Impact. Shinji is subjected to the Human Instrumentality Project, a process in which human souls are merged into a single divine entity. The film features the voice actors of the original series, including Megumi Ogata as Shinji, Yuko Miyamura as Asuka, and Megumi Hayashibara as Rei. The End of Evangelion was a box-office success, grossing ¥2.47 billion. It was honored with "Most Popular Film" at the Awards of the Japanese Academy, the Animation Kobe, and it also won the 1997 Animage Anime Grand Prix, and was praised for its violence, direction, editing, emotional power, and script, though some reviewers criticized its oblique religious symbolism and abstraction.

=== Petit Eva: Evangelion@School ===
Petit Eva: Evangelion@School is a chibi-style ONA series that ran for 24 broadcasts from March 20, 2007, to March 11, 2009. It was adapted from the Petit Eva and Petit Eva Bokura Tanken Dōkōkai spin-off manga illustrated by Ryusuke Hamamoto and Maki Ozora. It is a parody of the original series, where the original cast are now students at a junior high school in Tokyo-3. There are other minor differences to Neon Genesis Evangelion as well, such as the fact that the three Rei clones are now sisters and that Evangelion Unit-01 is now a human-sized student.

==== Episodes ====
| No. | Title | Original release date |
|---|---|---|
| 1 | "Going to School" "Gakkō ni Iku" (学校に行く) | March 20, 2007 |
Rei 2 wakes up and gets ready to go to school, using an automatic waffle-iron like machine to instantly dress herself. Unfortunately, she makes a wrong turn on the way to school and ends up near a forest. Meanwhile, Shinji is on his way to school, but a giant bird perches on a power line Shinji is standing under, and defecates on Shinji, burying him in a pile of excrement taller than he is. Rei 2 then runs like the wind to get to school on time, zipping by Shinji so fast that the shockwave blasts all of the excrement off of him and making him clean again. Rei 2 then arrives at school, which pops out of the ground (like Tokyo-3) at the push of a button on the gate.
| 2 | "Cleaning Time" "Osōji no Jikan" (お掃除の時間) | March 28, 2007 |
Shinji, Eva-01, Asuka, and Rei 2 are sweeping and mopping the classroom. As soon as Principal Gendo leaves the room, the children start playing: Asuka throws her wet towel at Shinji who bats it back to her using his broom, while Eva-01 cheers them on (Rei 2 keeps silently working). Every time Gendo comes back into the room, they instantly stop and switch back to cleaning quietly. Suspicious, Gendo keeps opening the door to the classroom again and again with increasing frequency, each time the children playing when the door is closed and cleaning when its open. Eventually, Gendo opens and closes the door so fast that the children accidentally switch it up; playing when Gendo is in the open doorway and cleaning when its closed. Without saying anything, Gendo leaves with the door closed, with the children unwittingly cleaning even though no one is watching them.
| 3 | "Friendship" "Yūjō" (友情) | March 20, 2008 |
While walking to school, Shinji falls down a deep hole, leading to a cavern where Eva-01 is practicing fight moves. Embarrassed, Eva-01 proceeds to chase Shinji: each of them digs tunnels very fast as they chase each other through the ground (possibly a reference to Gainax's other series, Gurren Lagann). They then start repeatedly popping their heads above the surface like rabbits, with Shinji continuing to try to evade Eva-01. However, at the end Shinji's head pops out of the ground, directly underneath Asuka, resulting in his getting a full view up her skirt. Shocked, Asuka jumps away, only to then stand directly on top of Eva-01's hole, giving Eva-01 an unintended look right up her skirt. Outraged, she flings them both across the schoolyard. Both are injured, but instead of continuing to fight Shinji, Eva-01 gives him a "thumbs up" salute (at getting a look at Asuka's panties), which Shinji returns with a thumbs up back to Eva-01.
| 4 | "Found It" "Hirotta" (拾った) | TBA |
As a train rushes through Tokyo-3, Sachiel appears in the city and runs about, causing much havoc. By chance, one of Eva-01's thrown boogies hits Sachiel in the face; angered, the Angel charges to the school and confronts Eva-01. Although Eva-01 is briefly put at a disadvantage by running out of power, Asuka and Shinji are able to recharge and super-size their friend. Outmatched, Sachiel attempts to flee, but Eva-01 seizes it, mashes it into a ball shape, and hurls it away. Elsewhere, Rei 1 is walking by the river when Sachiel lands in front of her, having somehow transformed into a small, lifeless plush doll. After washing the bogey off of its head, Rei 1 takes Sachiel home and hangs it on a laundry line to dry.
| 5 | "Youth Time" "Seishun no Jikan" (青春の時間) | TBA |
In the third short, Shinji and Eva-01 compete over giving a bicycle ride to Rei. Then Asuka runs them all over with her own bicycle.
| 6 | "Gym Time" "Taisō no Jikan" (体操の時間) | TBA |
| 7 | "Who Is That?" "Dare da?" (誰だ?) | July 11, 2008 |
Shinji, Asuka, and Rei 2 are walking through Tokyo-3 to get to school, and along the way are joined by Eva-01. A mysterious stranger wearing a ghost costume (a sheet with eye holes cut out) follows the children. When they get to school, the stranger tries to scare them by repeatedly popping up in their path and waving his arms like a ghost, but is ignored by the children. Meanwhile, little Rei 1 is happy because she has a 1,000 yen note and is going to a bakery to buy a dessert cake. Unfortunately, when she gets there the baker tells her that the cake actually costs 1,050 yen. Rei 1 is upset and begins to cry, but then the mysterious stranger wearing the ghost sheet costume walks in. The "ghost" puts a 50 yen coin on the counter, then quickly leaves. Rei 1 leaves happily with her cake, then notices the stranger in the ghost costume and follows him. He tries to tell her to go away and leave, but Rei 1 steps on his sheet as he walks away. This makes his costume fall off, and reveals that the "ghost" is actually Kaworu.
| 8 | "Romance?" "Romansu kaa" (ロマンスかぁ) | TBA |
| 9 | "Letter-writing Time" "Otegami no Jikan" (お手紙の時間) | TBA |
Rei passes a note in class to Shinji. He believes that it is a love letter, but instead, it is a note saying that Principal Ikari wants to see him after at the end of the day.
| 10 | "Gym Time -Finishing Up-" "Taisō no jikan -Hokan-" (体操の時間―補完―) | TBA |
| 11 | "Three sisters" "Sanshimai" (三姉妹) | July 11, 2008 |
Shinji, Rei 2, Asuka, and Eva-01 leave school at the end of the day. Eva-01 remembers that it left something in the building and leaves. Shinji then explains in flashback that while in school, he encountered someone wearing a full-body ghost costume with a zipper in the back, who motioned for him to finish zipping it up. Instead he unzipped it, to reveal that Misato was inside. Meanwhile, Rei 2 continues on her way home, but on her way through a forest she encountered a child completely covered in mud, who collapses. Rei 2 brings the child home and washes the mud off in the bath, revealing that it is another Rei clone. Rei 2 puts the new Rei 3 into her waffle-iron clothes machine, and she pops out wearing the yellow cardigan outfit that Rei does in the Alternate Universe from episode 26 of the original series. The three Reis (it turns out that Rei 1 also lives with Rei 2) then eat breakfast together.
| 12 | "Beat Up" "Bokoboko" (ボコボコ) | TBA |
| 13 | "Nap Time" "Inemuri no Jikan" (いねむりの時間) | TBA |
In this short, teacher Misato tries to throw chalk at Shinji for sleeping in class only for him to dodge it every single time until Asuka wakes him up by hitting him in the head.
| 14 | "Cleaning Time -Finishing Up-" "Osōji no jikan -Hokan-" (お掃除の時間―補完―) | TBA |
In another version of the "Cleaning Time" it is shown that Principal Gendo is really trying to give flowers to Rei 2 for her birthday, but chickens out at every attempt to give her the flowers.
| 15 | "Ikari" "Ikari" (いかり) | TBA |
At school, Shinji, Rei 2, and Asuka are watching Eva-01 as it balances three spinning plates on sticks (one in each hand and one on its foot) and a beach ball on its nose. Eva-01 offers for Shinji to try too. Shinji is reluctant because it is difficult, but Eva-01 insists. Shinji barely manages to keep all three spinning plates from falling, but when Eva-01 adds the beach ball to his head, he cannot control it and it goes shooting off. The beach ball lands on Principal Gendo's head. The other children run away in fear, while Shinji remains frozen. Gendo glares at him, but otherwise leaves without scolding him, to Shinji's relief. Elsewhere, Rei 3 waves at the person wearing the "ghost" sheet (secretly Kaworu) as he walks out of a store in town. Later that afternoon, Shinji returns home to find Yui Ikari preparing dinner (as in the Alternate Universe, Shinji, Yui, and Gendo live together, but Gendo is the school Principal and still does not get along very well with Shinji). Gendo enjoys a bath as Shinji tells Yui about the beach ball incident in school today. Gendo then comes in and tells him to go to bed, which Yui agrees to. Gendo then sits at his desk in the dark in Shinji's room and reminisces back to when Shinji was a toddler and he and Yui took Shinji on a picnic in a field filled with flowers. Toddler-Shinji asks Gendo for an onigiri from their picnic basket, and Gendo gives him one.
| 16 | "New Toy" "Shin Omocha" (新おもちゃ) | TBA |
| 17 | "Lunch Break Time" "Ohiruyasumi no Jikan" (お昼休みの時間) | TBA |
Shinji sits down to have lunch at school, but then Eva-01 sits down next to him and begins eating a "lunch" consisting of batteries. Eva-01 notices Shinji's lunch, and Shinji offers it a piece. Eva-01 likes it and, in return, insists that Shinji eat one of the batteries from its lunch. To be polite, Shinji swallows the battery, but this encourages Eva-01 to then swap their lunch boxes entirely, and to continue to be polite, Shinji chokes down the rest of the batteries. Shinji is then shown leaving a bathroom stall with an extremely pained expression.
| 18 | "Youth Time -Finishing Up-" "Seishun no Jikan -Hokan-" (青春の時間―補完―) | TBA |
A parallel to Episode 5, featuring Shinji and Eva-01 attempting to give Asuka a ride on their respective bicycles. She rejects both of them, prompting both to begin offering rides to Rei 2, who is walking some distance behind Asuka. Left alone, Asuka sits near the river and begins playing with her pocket computer, only to be hit in the face by Rei 2's book when she, Eva-01, and Shinji ride by. Enraged, Asuka leaps aboard her own bicycle and rams Eva-O1, dropping all three of them in a heap. Not satisfied with this, Asuka wheels around and runs over her classmates, giving a cheer of victory.
| 19 | "Friend" "Tomodachi" (ともだち) | TBA |
| 20 | "You're late!" "Osoi!" (おそい！) | TBA |
Shinji is walking in a desert, dying of thirst. He looks up to see a house, he enters it and there is a dripping faucet. The faucet turns on and floods the house. Shinji then tries to walk into another room, where he is pushed back by a hand, which then tells him to wait. A foot comes through the curtain, wiggling its toes at Shinji, then a large hand poking him. A scary face goes through the curtain and gets close to Shinji before screaming at him. Shinji waits in the house and brown liquid fills the room he is in and then disappears back under the curtain. A small cat walks out and tells him he can go into the room now. In the room, Shinji finds a cello and begins to play it, he hears music from the other room, a wall drops down and it is Kaworu, Rei and Asuka all playing violins.
| 21 | "Tea Shop" "Chamise" (ちゃみせ) | TBA |
It is raining and Rei 2 is at home. She calls Rei 1 and 3 to eat but no one answers. She sits at the table waiting for them. Rei 1 is at a playground staring at a puddle. Rei 3 is near the playground performing tricks with her umbrella. Rei 3 goes to the playground and asks Rei 1 what is wrong. She says she is hungry and then they both stare at the puddle. After waking up at the table, Rei 2 goes to the tea shop and buys something, then goes to the playground where Rei 1 and 3 are and asks them if they want takoyaki. The agree and all go home and eat.
| 22 | "Showdown" "Taiketsu" (対決) | TBA |
Two background children are getting picked on by Zeruel. Unable to retaliate, they flee into the school. Shinji is reading and Eva-01 is picking his non-existent nose. The two children run into the room, asking Eva-01 to beat up Zeruel for them. Eva-01 agrees, and asks Shinji to accompany him. The two go out to search for Zeruel, but Eva-01 shortly leaves Shinji to fight Zeruel for him. Knowing that Shinji cannot fight, he shamefully walks home, but bumps into Zuruel a few steps forward. Shinji flees in fear, with Zuruel giving chase. Both fall into a hidden hole that leads into a cavern in which Eva-01 is practicing boxing moves. Knowing Shinji has already been into his cave before, he targets Zeruel instead. They both exchange glares, and Eva-01 opens the fight by picking his non-existent nose. He scores gold, and two boogers appear on his fingers. Zeruel attempts to fight back, but his wide-spread "hands" are too big to fit into his nostrils. Unable to retaliate, he flees, and Eva-01 gives chase with the boogers. Both appear in the school-courtyard, with Zeruel still fleeing. Eva-01 flicks the boogers at the latter. Fortunately for Zeruel, the Angel trips on a pebble, and the boogers barely pass over his back. The two projectiles are now aimed at an unaware Asuka and Rei 2. Rei 2 quickly reacts and tosses tissues into the air, catching the boogers before they can make contact. They land harmlessly into a trashcan. Surprised, Eva-01 runs up beside Zeruel. Rei 2 scolds Eva-01 that if it ever has boogers again, it is to wipe its nose and put it in a trashcan. Embarrassed, Eva-01 scratches his head, and Zeruel falls in love with Rei 2 for saving him.
| 23 | "Caught a Cold" "Kaze Hiita" (風邪引いた) | TBA |
| 24 | "Flying" "Tondeku" (飛んでく) | March 11, 2009 |
In the school, Misato takes attendance and discovers that Eva-01 is missing, with the latter having skipped class to go fishing with Zeruel. As Eva-01 relaxes on the riverbank, Zeruel catches a large, glowing blue ball that promptly absorbs the Angel into itself. Eva-01 pursues the ball as it flies to the school, where it absorbs several students. When Misato tries to punch the ball, she gets stuck to it as the orb flies back into the courtyard. Shinji's attempt to grab his teacher's leg narrowly fails, but Toji manages to free Misato by throwing himself into the ball. Shinji falls out the window while catching Misato, and Eva-01 catches him in turn. As Asuka, Rei 2, Kensuke, and Hikari rush outside to meet up with Shinji and Misato, Eva-01 attacks the ball, only to be absorbed into it. Misato rallies the remaining students against the strange aggressor, but the ball absorbs them as well. After absorbing Futuyutski and Gendo, the ball swells to a massive size. The MP Eva brings this to the attention of Kaworu, standing on a rooftop in the city below the hill - in response, Kaworu presses a button on a remote control that sends the main tower of the school rocketing into the ball. One massive explosion later, everyone trapped by the ball is freed, and the ball itself is reduced to colorful, confetti-like fragments. Shinji looks around in confusion, only to jump in shock when the school tower lands back in its original spot.

=== Rebuild of Evangelion ===
Rebuild of Evangelion, known in Japan and on Amazon Prime Video as Evangelion: New Theatrical Edition (ヱヴァンゲリヲン新劇場版, Evangerion Shin Gekijōban), is a Japanese animated film series and a retelling of the original Neon Genesis Evangelion anime television series, produced by Studio Khara. Hideaki Anno served as the writer and general manager of the project, with Kazuya Tsurumaki and Masayuki directing the films themselves. Yoshiyuki Sadamoto, Ikuto Yamashita and Shirō Sagisu returned to provide character designs, mechanical designs and music respectively.

The film tetralogy uses digital ink and paint, some CG animation, and provides new scenes, settings and characters, with a completely new conclusion in the fourth and final film. Another stated intention of the series is for it to be more accessible to non-fans than the original TV series and films were. It was made to present an alternate retelling of episodes 1-19 of the TV series (including new scenes, settings, and characters) and a completely new conclusion to the story. The first film Evangelion: 1.0 You Are (Not) Alone was released in Japan on September 1, 2007, with Evangelion: 2.0 You Can (Not) Advance and Evangelion: 3.0 You Can (Not) Redo released on June 27, 2009, and November 17, 2012, respectively. The final film, Evangelion: 3.0+1.0 Thrice Upon a Time, was released on March 8, 2021. Upon its home media release on March 8, 2023, two new original video animations, Evangelion: 3.0 (-46h) and Evangelion: 3.0 (-120min) were included.

=== Untitled anime series ===
An anime series was announced following the "Evangelion:30+; 30th Anniversary of Evangelion" festival in February 2026. It is set to be produced by CloverWorks and Khara and directed by Kazuya Tsurumaki and Tōko Yatabe, with scripts written by Yoko Taro and music composed by Keiichi Okabe.

== Manga and light novel ==
A number of manga series based on the anime have been released, most notably the official series by series character designer Yoshiyuki Sadamoto, which was first serialized in February 1995 (eight months before the series' official premiere, in order to promote interest), and ended in November 2014, 19 years later. Seven other manga have been created: the shoujo romance story Neon Genesis Evangelion: Angelic Days by Fumino Hayashi, shonen comedy Shinji Ikari Raising Project by Takahashi Osamu, self-parody It's A Miraculous Win by Koume Yoshida, mystery series Neon Genesis Evangelion: Campus Apocalypse by Min Min, chibi comedic parody Petit Eva: Evangelion@School, detective story Neon Genesis Evangelion: The Shinji Ikari Detective Diary and gamer-themed parody Neon Genesis Evangelion: Legend of the Piko-Piko Middle School Students.

A light novel series Neon Genesis Evangelion: ANIMA was serialized from 2008 to 2013 in Dengeki Hobby Magazine, authored by the series mechanical designer Ikuto Yamashita. The series is set in an alternate future diverging from the events of the anime. The novel begins 3 years after the end of the Human Instrumentality Project, replacing episodes 25 and 26 of the anime, as well as the End of Evangelion film. The team of former Eva pilots are coming to terms with the aftermath of the battle at NERV HQ, while adapting to normal life. Three clones of Rei Ayanami have been put into Eva units and sent into space as a precautionary way to seek out and eradicate the remaining mass-produced Evangelion units, as well as monitor Earth's safety. In 2021, the final film of the Rebuild of Evangelion tetralogy, Evangelion: 3.0+1.0 Thrice Upon a Time, received a re-release dubbed 3.0+1.01 that included a prequel manga to the events of Evangelion: 3.0 You Can (Not) Redo titled Evangelion 3.0 (-120 min.), written by co-director Kazuya Tsurumaki at Hideaki Anno's initiative. It was later adapted in motion comic form for 3.0+1.0's home media release.

In 2010, two tribute manga were released: the collection Neon Genesis Evangelion: Comic Tribute, and another by Tony Takezaki, simply entitled Tony Takezaki's Evangelion.

== Soundtracks and music ==
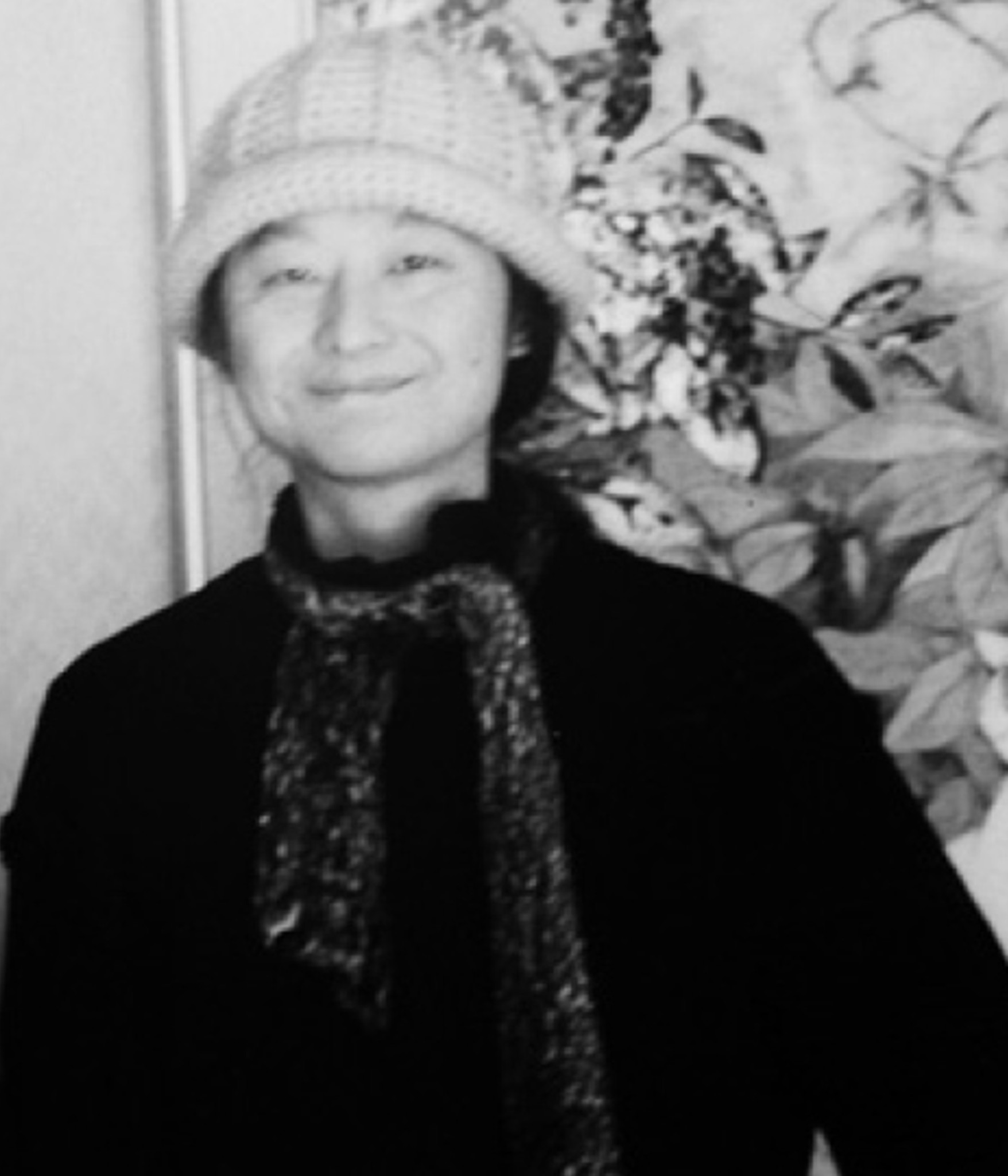
Shirō Sagisu, composer of the majority of the franchise's soundtrack

Shirō Sagisu composed most of the music for Neon Genesis Evangelion and for the original TV show's three OST albums. He received the 1997 Kobe Animation award for "Best Music Score". King Records and their label Starchild (specializing in music, animation and film) distributed most of the albums, singles and box sets. For the anime series, Yoko Takahashi performed the song "A Cruel Angel's Thesis" which was used as the opening theme song for the series. The song "Fly Me to the Moon" originally by Bart Howard was performed by various voice actors from the anime series and these versions of the song were used as the ending theme song for the series. Theme songs were also granted for the films in the franchise Evangelion: Death and Rebirth, its follow-up The End of Evangelion and four installments of the Rebuild of Evangelion film series. A series of four albums titled "Evangelion Classic" was released, each album containing the classical music of Beethoven, Verdi, Handel, and J.S. Bach respectively.

== Proposed live-action film ==
Development of a live-action movie version of Neon Genesis Evangelion by Gainax, Weta Workshop Ltd., and ADV Films (then the worldwide distributor of the Evangelion series outside of Asia and Australia) was announced at the Cannes Film Festival on May 21, 2003. Early coverage included ADV Films raising "about half of the $100 million to $120 million needed to produce the film" and some concept art produced by Weta Workshop. ADV was particularly inspired by the success of The Lord of the Rings film series, and wanted to replicate it with a film of their own, possibly a trilogy.

As time passed without any official announcements, the project showed increasing signs of being in development hell. At Anime Expo 2008, ADV founders Matt Greenfield and John Ledford claimed that they had hired the producer John Woo, pitched the idea to other producers such as Jerry Bruckheimer and Steven Spielberg, and seen increased interest in the wake of the success of the 2007 film Transformers. At Ohayocon 2009, Greenfield claimed that several U.S. studios were competing for rights to the project, predicting an official announcement naming project details within the next nine months (he later noted that the closer he got to sealing a deal, the less he could say anything about it). Though the sudden collapse and asset sale of A.D. Vision in September 2009 raised concerns over the project's viability, Greenfield, Ledford, and producer Joseph Chou insisted the project was still actively searching for a director.

In August 2011, A.D. Vision sued Gainax, claiming their refusal to accept an option payment for the perpetual live-action rights to Evangelion was a breach of contract and resulted in losing an opportunity to produce the film with a major studio. ADV had asked to be awarded the full live-action rights and any accruing legal fees. It was one of multiple legal battles between Gainax and ADV. Gainax rejected this claim and returned their payment of $100,000.

Tiffany Grant, voice actress for Asuka in the ADV localization and then married to Greenfield, told Polygon in 2019 that the project was a dud and never had a shooting script or any signed crew or cast. Although Weta artists had talked with some Gainax staff, by that time Anno had already set on making the Rebuild films, and had started to take the franchise with him to his new studio Khara, despite ADV continuing to negotiate only with Gainax, and the project faded into abandonment.

Anno has been questioned on a live-action adaptation of Evangelion, particularly a Western one, multiple times. He has shown himself resistant to the idea. Anno reiterated that Eva was always conceived as an animation and made with a Japanese audience with mind, and he believes Western creators have too different a mindset and methods compared to Japanese creators: "There may be Japanese film-makers who can collaborate with Western creators, but I'm not one of them". He also dislikes live-action adaptations of anime, as well as live-action works inspired by anime overall. Anno believes Eva could not be properly expressed in live-action, and strongly dislikes the idea of Hollywood remaking it.

== Other media ==
The Evangelion franchise has spread from the original anime into a number of different media, with some following the official canon (of the 26-episode anime series and its three related films or the new Rebuild series) and others differing on important plot points originally introduced in the anime.

=== Books ===
- Newtype 100% Collection: A 1997 collection of Newtype's coverage of Evangelion, particularly of artwork
- Death & Rebirth and End of Evangelion theatrical pamphlets: Limited edition supplementary booklets were distributed in Japanese theaters during the initial run of both Evangelion: Death and Rebirth and The End of Evangelion. The latter pamphlet, nicknamed the "Red Cross Book" by overseas fans, contains descriptions and definitions of many areas and terms in the Evangelion storyline that the series left unclear.
- Der Mond and Die Sterne: Two German-titled art books of the work of Yoshiyuki Sadamoto, including concept art, character designs and renditions, and commentary about the Evangelion series. Both books also feature selections of Sadamoto's work on earlier and later works (such as Nadia, or Fatal Fury 2).
- 2015//The Last Year of Ryohji Kaji: A limited edition, Japan-only publication by Newtype in 1997. The book is a combination photo/text book profiling the character of Ryōji Kaji through 16 mission "documents" left by him. The included letters, notes, and poems were written by Hiroshi Yamaguchi (a writer on the original TV series) and the photographs (including digitally-altered pictures of Evangelions, Angels, and other series-related objects) were taken by Ichiro Kamei.
- Groundwork of Evangelion: is set of artbooks that contains production sketches. The first three cover the anime, with Volume 1 covering episode 1–8, Volume 2 covering 9–19, and Volume 3 covering 20–26. Groundwork of Evangelion The Movie 1 covers the first movie. Groundwork of Evangelion: 1.0 You Are (Not) Alone covers the first Rebuild film. Two volumes cover Groundwork Of Evangelion You Can (Not) Advance 2.0, the second Rebuild film.
- Neon Genesis Evangelion RPG: The NERV White Paper: A 158-page card-based RPG book released on April 20, 1996. It was written by Mitsuuhiro Nakazawa
- Neon Genesis Evangelion Proposal: An early pre-production booklet that describes the premise of the series and introduces the main characters. Many changes were made from the proposal to the finished show, such as different characterization and even unused Angels.

=== Video games ===
Neon Genesis Evangelion has spawned a number of video games. These range from action games such as the same titled game for the Nintendo 64 and its sequel on the PlayStation 2, the fighting game Battle Orchestra, the visual novels Girlfriend of Steel and Girlfriend of Steel 2nd, and the rhythm game 3nd Impact (read "Sound Impact"). Characters from Evangelion also make numerous appearances in other titles such as in the Super Robot Wars series by Banpresto. The mobile game "Monster Strike", by the Japanese company Mixi, did a collaboration featuring dungeons and collectible units from the series. A continuing crossover event is available in The Battle Cats features the series' characters. A crossover with Final Fantasy XIV is set to be featured in the Evercold expansion as a raid series. Characters and locations from the series are set to appear as downloadable content in Sonic Racing: CrossWorlds.

=== Audio dramas ===
A parody radio drama, Neon Genesis Evangelion – After the End, was released in 1996 as part of the NEON GENESIS EVANGELION ADDITION album. The story features the anime's original cast reuniting to star in a new Evangelion series, while attempting to change various themes of the series to make it more popular/accessible than it already is. A separate Evangelion audio cassette drama was released in 1996.

=== Pachinko ===
A number of Evangelion-themed pachinko and pachisuro machines are offered at pachinko parlors:

- CR Neon Genesis Evangelion (Pachinko)
- CR Neon Genesis Evangelion Second Impact (Pachinko)
- Neon Genesis Evangelion (Pachisuro)
- CR Neon Genesis Evangelion —Kiseki no Kachi wa— (Pachinko)

By 2015, more than two million Evangelion pachinko and pachislot machines had been sold, generating ¥700 billion in revenue.

=== Amusement park ===
On July 22, 2010, Fuji-Q Highland opened a 1,460m^{2} section devoted to Evangelion, featuring a lifesize entry plug and statue of Mari Makinami, an approximately 3-meter titanium Lance of Longinus, NERV hallways with character cutouts that lead to a hangar room with the 1:1 bust of Eva Unit-01, SEELE monoliths, appropriate cosplay, Eva-themed hotel rooms, and food products. A bust of Eva Unit-02 modeled after a scene in Evangelion: 2.0 was installed in 2011. In late 2018, Universal Studios announced there will be a Godzilla and Evangelion crossover attraction at Universal Studios Japan.

=== Related media ===
==== Japan Animator Expo ====
Evangelion: Another Impact is the anime short number 12 from the Japan Animator Expo, a collaboration between the Khara studio and the media company Dwango. The anime short could be seen on the official website of the project, but the website closed on December 31, 2018. Since, a company who sell animal related product have bought the domain name, and the Japan Animator Expo website no longer exist. The credits song is called "Marking Time, Waiting for Death", by Shiro Sagisu.

==== Transformers ====
A Transformers x Evangelion crossover featuring a web novel titled "Transformers Mode EVA" and toy line featured a Transformers and Evangelion crossover. In the events of Transformers Mode "EVA" follows the Autobots arriving in Tokyo-3 dealing with an Angel attack, interrupted by the ghost of Starscream who possessed the Angel to attack the Autobots. When Unit-1 was deployed Optimus Prime scanned EVA-1 to become Optimus Prime-EVA and with the help of the Autobots and Misato he defeats the Angel/Decepticon hybrid. A new Transformers and Evangelion collab has been revealed, this time in the form of a toy of Optimus Prime with a design inspired by Unit 01.

==== Godzilla ====
Universal Studios Japan announced there will be a Godzilla and Evangelion crossover with an attraction. The attraction ended up being called Godzilla vs. Evangelion: The Real 4-D and was open from 31 May to 25 August 2019. Universal Studios Japan also released exclusive merchandise including an EVA-1 themed popcorn bucket.

==== Shinkansen Henkei Robo Shinkalion ====
In episode 31 of Shinkansen Henkei Robo Shinkalion anime, Shinji is the pilot of the 500 TYPE EVA, a redo of the Shinkalion 500 Kodama stylized to resembled the real TYPE EVA Livery of the 500 Series Shinkansen and the EVA Unit 01. He later appeared in the show's tie-in film, Shinkalion the Movie: The Marvelous Fast ALFA-X That Comes From The Future, and an episode of its sequel series, Shinkansen Henkei Robo Shinkalion Z.

==== 30th Anniversary Special Screening ====
Evangelion Broadcast 30th Anniversary Special Screening, an exclusive short film written by Anno and directed by Naoyuki Asano, was shown exclusively at the Yokohama Arena during the "Evangelion:30+; 30th Anniversary of Evangelion" festival in February 2026. The short features both Asukas in a manzai performance in which Shikinami presents Soryu alternate worlds in search for her happiness. The film was intended to be shown only at the event without a digital release of any form, with Khara taking down cam recordings of the film on X. However, after accidentally leaking the film by attaching it to the takedown mails, the film was officially released on YouTube on March 7, 2026.

=== Fanworks ===
Evangelion is also popular among doujinshi, inspiring notable titles such as Evangelion RE-TAKE (an unofficial sequel to the End of Evangelion) by Studio Kimigabuchi and even works by famous manga artists, such as Birth of Evangelion by Yun Kōga.

== See also ==
- Portrayals of God in popular media
