= Themes of Neon Genesis Evangelion =

Academic analyses of Neon Genesis Evangelion

The themes of Neon Genesis Evangelion (新世紀エヴァンゲリオン, Shin Seiki Evangerion) have been the subject of continued casual and academic debate since the Japanese media franchise was created by Gainax. In Japan, a national discussion of the anime Neon Genesis Evangelion resulted in widespread coverage of the show's endings and its retellings, contributing to the interest in academic analysis of the show. Most of the franchise features an apocalyptic mecha action story, which revolves around the efforts by the paramilitary organization NERV to fight hostile beings called Angels, using giant humanoids called Evangelions piloted by select teenagers. The psychological, religious, and philosophical themes explored in the work represent most of the discussion. Evangelion's influence in postmodern apocalyptic narratives on the sekaikei genre has been great, but it remains the most successful example.

== Psychoanalysis ==
Evangelion has long been taken as a deeply personal expression of Hideaki Anno's struggles and his long battle with depression. From the start, Evangelion invokes many psychological themes. Phrases used in episodes, their titles, and the names of the background music frequently derive from Sigmund Freud's works and perhaps some Lacanian influences in general. Examples include "Thanatos", "Oral stage", "Separation Anxiety", and "Mother Is the First Other" (the basis of the Oedipus complex is that the mother is the first object of the child's love). The scenery and buildings in Tokyo-3 often seem laden with psychological import, even in the first episode.

Many of the characters have deep psychological traumas regarding their parents. Shinji's introversion and social anxiety stem from the death of his mother at an early age and his abandonment by his father. Asuka was the target of her mother's insanity and discovered her mother's body after she hanged herself; her tough, abrasive personality is a means of distracting herself from her pain, and she has made piloting Unit 02 her only source of pride and satisfaction. Misato's father neglected her when she was a child; after he was killed in the Second Impact, she stopped talking for a couple of years. In episode 25, Misato states that she was both attracted to and afraid of Ryoji Kaji because he reminded her of her father. Similarly, many scenes overlap images of Shinji's mother with depictions of his potential lovers, both lining up with Freudian theories. Ritsuko saw her mother having an affair with Gendo Ikari; after her mother's suicide, she felt both attraction and hate towards Gendo. Indeed, the last two episodes are "stripped of the high-tech gadgetry and the colorful visuals that characterize the earlier episodes in the series, these last two episodes take place largely in muted tones… a form of interrogation proceeds to be carried out as he [Shinji] asks himself—or is asked by an unseen voice—probing psychological questions." The questions elicit unexpected answers, particularly the ones dealing with Shinji's motivation for piloting the Eva—he feels worthless and afraid of others (especially his father) if he is not piloting the Eva. Asuka and Rei are also depicted in deep introspection and consideration of their psyches. Asuka realizes that her entire being is caught up in being a competent Eva pilot and that without it, she has no personal identity: "I'm the junk… I'm worthless. Nobody needs a pilot who can't control her own Eva." Rei, who has displayed minimal emotion throughout the series, reveals that she does have one impulse; it is Thanatos, an inclination to death: "I am Happy. Because I want to die, I want to despair, I want to return to nothing." In episode 25, Shinji and Asuka show that they suffered similar pasts and found different ways of dealing with it. This is further established in Shinji when he claims he has no life without Eva, and this is disproven by the world shown in episode 26, followed by the famous "Congratulations" scene.

== Religion ==
The most prominent symbolism takes its inspiration from Jewish and Christian sources. It frequently uses iconography and themes from Abrahamic religions and mysticism such as Gnosticism and Kabbalah. Alongside the effort put into the combat scenes, Evangelion also attempts to convincingly portray the psychic struggles in which the characters engage. These struggles are both wide-ranging and emotionally draining. They are also presented with psychoanalytical sophistication as the characters try to come to grips with their own inner turmoil, their problematic relations with each other, and their relation to more remote forms of Otherness—the gigantic machines that are the EVAs and with which they must synchronize, and the enigmatic Angels who present a riddle that is increasingly depicted in terms of what seems to be a Christian or perhaps Gnostic notion of apocalypse." and Kabbalah in the series's examination of religious ideas and themes. Anno suggested a grand theme with the work, including the nature of evolution, the existence of God, and its impact on humanity.

Assistant director Kazuya Tsurumaki said that they originally used Christian symbolism and themes only to give the project a unique edge against other giant robot shows, that there is no Christian meaning to the series, and that it was not meant to be controversial (although it was). Tsurumaki would later regret the decision. Hiroki Sato, head of Gainax's PR department, and Toshio Okada have made similar statements. Anno has said that Eva is susceptible to multiple interpretations.

The "Angels" refer to the angels of God from the Old Testament, most of which bear the same names. In 1993, the Evangelion proposal presented the angels, including names and appearances. (Note: The Neon Genesis Evangelion Proposal documents use an alternate Japanese translation of Apostolo. The term shito (使徒) is used, the Japanese term for Biblical apostles, alongside Apostolo (アポストロ), which became "Angel". The names of the Apostolo are the names of angels and not the apostles, as seen in the media.) The most important angels are Adam and Lilith. The first Angel is named Adam, just as the biblical Adam is the first man created by God. The second Angel is called Lilith, a reference to the Jewish folklore in which Lilith is the first wife of Adam. Lilith is shown crucified and impaled with a spear named the "Lance of Longinus", the same lance used to pierce the side of Jesus Christ during his crucifixion, according to the Gospel of Nicodemus. Eve or Eva comes from Adam's rib; similarly, the Evangelions come from the Angel first identified as Adam. The goal of the Angels is to return to Adam and create the Third Impact, which would destroy humanity. Kaworu Nagisa recognizes humanity as beings of Lilith and identifies them as Lilim. Several times throughout the series, the defeat of an Angel results in a Christian cross-shaped explosion.

The Magi supercomputers of NERV are named Melchior, Balthasar, and Caspar after the names traditionally given to the Magi mentioned in the Gospel of Matthew as having visited Jesus Christ in Bethlehem. The Marduk Institute is a front organization for Nerv, tasked with finding teenagers suitable for piloting Evangelion units. Marduk was the name of the chief Babylonian deity and patron god of the city of Babylon. The Tree of Sephiroth (Tree of Life) is mentioned and shown in the opening title sequence and Gendo's office, with Hebrew inscriptions (the terms written there are mostly Kabbalic). It also appears in The End of Evangelion during Seele's version of Instrumentality. SEELE's logo refers to biblical descriptions of God having seven eyes (Zechariah 3:9, the "stone with seven eyes", and Revelation 5:6, where the Lamb of God has seven eyes).

Broderick writes, "Anno's project is a postmodernist retelling of the Genesis myth, as his series title implies—Neon Genesis Evangelion. It is a new myth of origin, complete with its own deluge, Armageddon, apocalypse, and transcendence." Other analysts bring additional views that include a combination of religious and psychological themes, whereas Kraemer's views diverge from Broderick's but affirm several themes, including Shinji as a messiah figure. Carpentieri writes, "Eva's message for our age is one that radically and bravely attempts to upend, deconstruct, and recontextualize an understanding of Biblical narrative in a useful way."

== Philosophy ==
Themes of individuality, consciousness, freedom, choice, and responsibility are heavily relied upon throughout the entire series, particularly through the philosophies of Søren Kierkegaard. Episode 16's title refers to Kierkegaard's book, "The Sickness unto Death". "The sickness unto death" refers to "despair", and in the introduction of this work, Kierkegaard says, "Even death itself is not 'the sickness unto death'. Not to mention any of the suffering on Earth known as destitution, illness, misery, privations, misfortune, pain, anguish, grief, or regret." The Human Instrumentality Project may be inspired by the philosophy developed by Johann Gottlieb Fichte and Georg Wilhelm Friedrich Hegel. At the same time, some existentialist ideas appearing in the work could also be found in Jean-Paul Sartre's Being and Nothingness and Martin Heidegger's Being and Time. The title of Episode 4, "Hedgehog's Dilemma", refers to the hedgehog's dilemma, Arthur Schopenhauer's analogy about the challenges of human intimacy. Evangelion: 3.0 You Can (Not) Redo introduced the organization WILLE, whose name is derived from the Schopenhauerian concept of the will.

== Identity and hybridity ==
Orbaugh notes that "the young protagonists incarnate monstrosity/hybridity in several ways simultaneously", highlighting their cyborgization with the Evangelions and the "Angel" DNA which allows their synchronization, with additional hybridity for the mixed-race Asuka and the cloned Rei. (Note: "The EVA suits can only be piloted by fourteen-year-old adolescents because pilots must contain in their genetic make-up a trace of the DNA of the first “angel” to attack the Earth, fifteen years earlier, which exploded in the Antarctic and scattered in microscopic bits all over the world. Only children conceived or in the womb at the time of this occurrence can take on the cyborg subjectivity that allows them to defeat the subsequent “angels.”" While never explicitly given in the anime series, Ritsuko's allusion to the age of the pilots coupled with the timing of the Second Impact to arrive at this conclusion. However, the circumstances surrounding Rei are more complex.)

=== Sexuality and gender ===
Shinji's integration with the Evangelion presents a unique concept of "inter-corporation", where Shinji and the Evangelion penetrate and fill each other, which is further expressed by the analogous sexual intercourse taking place, with the male Shinji taking a female role. (Note: "...the very phalliclooking [sic] entry plug containing Shinji is inserted into a waiting orifice in the suit — analogous to the body's incorporation of the penis in sexual intercourse. But immediately thereafter the entry plug fills with liquid, and despite Shinji's terrified attempts to hold his breath, he eventually has no choice but to fill his lungs with the (oxygen-bearing) liquid. This is a process I call inter-corporation — the mutual incorporation of the other; both the mechanical suit and the biotic Shinji have penetrated into and filled the other." and " This scene, therefore, presents an interesting challenge to the modernist definitions of the sexed body, which rely on beliefs about the relative permeability of male and female bodies. ... The instant synchronization that Shinji achieves with the EVA-suit reflects his analogous permeability to the information that must be shared between the suit and him if a new and functional cyborg amalgam is to result from their intercorporation. In this sense, Shinji is coded female, despite his male body.") Combined with the resulting and literal Oedipal complex, the act raises questions about gender and sexual identity. (Note: "... in entering and being entered by the EVA suit Shinji is actually intercorporating with his mother (at his father's insistence), we have a beautifully and shockingly literalized evocation of the typical adolescent boy's Oedipal rivalry with the father over possession of the mother's body. This Frankensteinian dismemberment and re-suturing of the Oedipal family romance simultaneously puts into question the gender and sexual identities of Evangelion's protagonists.") In another discussion, Orbaugh highlights that the inter-corporation of a female allows for the weapons to defeat the Angels and that the male terror of being radically feminized, inter-penetrated and inter-corporated, shows the need to embrace the "abject femininity—permeability/penetrability—that is repressed in techno-patriarchal society." (Note: This statement is based upon the original "gynesis" idea of Alice Jardine, as referenced and interpreted by Kotani Mari to describe Shinji's feminization. Mari describes Shinji's epiphany as, "The more strongly he desires a miraculous breakthrough, the more deconstructive his own sexuality becomes," highlighting the meaning of the battle in episode 19.) Yoshiyuki Sadamoto has described the feminine character design for Shinji, describing how he was initially essentially a male version of Nadia from Nadia: The Secret of Blue Water and how his relationship with Asuka was modeled on Nadia's relationship with Jean, Nadia's love interest and eventual husband in the series.

== Bibliography ==
- Napier, Susan J. (2002). "When the Machines Stop: Fantasy, Reality, and Terminal Identity in "Neon Genesis Evangelion" and "Serial Experiments Lain"". Science Fiction Studies. 29 (3): 418–435. ISSN 0091-7729.
