= Alice Jardine =

American literary scholar (born 1951)

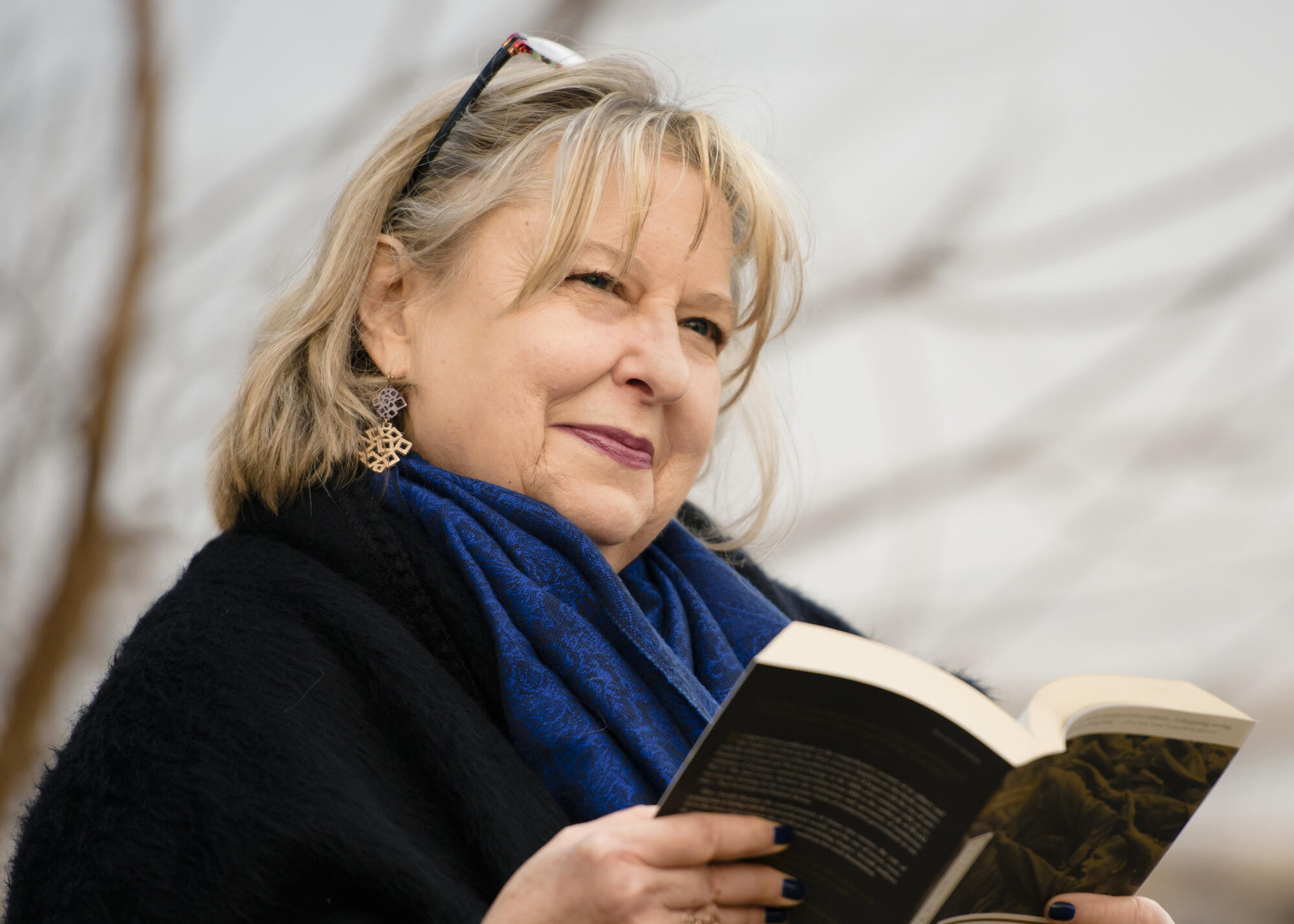
- Alice Jardine, photographed by Liza Voll (2020)
- Born: May 7, 1951 (age 75)
- Occupations: Professor, Writer, Feminist Scholar
- Known for: feminist theory, critical theory, French poststructuralist theory

Alice Jardine is an American literary scholar, cultural critic, and feminist theorist. She is Research Professor of Romance Languages and Literatures and of Studies of Women, Gender & Sexuality at Harvard University, having co-founded and led the development of the latter. In the field of 20th-21st-century French/Francophone literature and thought, Jardine's research focuses on Post-WWII fiction and critical theory, with an emphasis on French poststructuralist and American feminist and queer thought. She is the author and editor of numerous books and articles.

== Early life and education ==
Jardine grew up in Dayton, Ohio, attending public schools there until she left for college in 1969. She received her B.A. from Ohio State University (1973); her M.A. in French (1977) and her Ph.D. in Comparative Literature (1982) from Columbia University. In 1973, while on a Fulbright Scholarship to teach at the Lycée Hélène Boucher in Paris, she knocked on Simone de Beauvoir’s door and introduced herself, commencing a years-long conversation with the famous feminist philosopher and activist. Selected by the French Department at Columbia to be an exchange student in Paris, Jardine was the first woman in modern times to study at the École normale supérieure-rue d'Ulm (1979–80), where she was also reportedly the first woman to live in Samuel Beckett’s former dorm room.

== Career ==
In 1982, Jardine was appointed to Assistant Professor of Romance Languages and Literatures at Harvard University, advancing to Associate Professor in 1985 and full Professor in 1989. During this time, when relatively few women were appointed to the status of full tenured faculty, Jardine helped found the Committee on Degrees in Women's Studies concentration as well as the Boston Graduate Consortium in Women's Studies. Despite limited support from the Harvard administration, she prevailed and women's studies at Harvard has grown exponentially since its early days. The program was renamed Studies of Women, Gender, and Sexuality in 2003. Jardine was also a founding member of the Boston-area Graduate Consortium in Women's Studies – alongside other scholars such as Ruth Perry (MIT), Joyce Antler (Brandeis University), Laura Frader (Northeastern University), Carol Hurd Green (Boston College), and Barbara Haber (Radcliffe College), and Christiane Romero (Tufts University) – which is still active today. Jardine's courses at Harvard focusing on issues of gender, sexuality, and women's studies have been highly popular among undergraduates, like her "I Like Ike but I Love Lucy" course, which at the time of its offering was one of the few cultural studies courses offered by the University and to which students––men and women alike––"swarmed." In addition to mentoring, advising, and administrating, Jardine has been a key voice in advocating both nationally and internationally for the academic legitimacy of the field, dismantling broad administrative misconceptions about the field as simply a “polemical” discipline, or as a women's or affirmative action center.

== Research and writing ==
Jardine's intellectual trajectory and contribution to feminist theory owes much to the fact of having crossed paths or even worked alongside numerous 20th and 21st-century philosophers and thinkers. One such formative figure was Simone de Beauvoir, whom Jardine met just in 1973. Another major influence on Jardine's intellectual commitment to the stakes of feminism is the philosopher and writer Julia Kristeva, for whom Jardine served as research assistant while a graduate student at Columbia University in 1976. Alongside Leon Roudiez and Thomas Gora, Jardine played a prominent role in the translation of Kristeva's work into English during the 1980s, and, as of 2020, is the first person to write Kristeva's complete biography.

=== 1980s ===
In the 1980s, Jardine was best known as a key figure in the ongoing global debates about feminism and its stakes in the contemporary era. Her earliest work participated in the study of what has been called “new French feminisms.” Her well-known 1985 book, Gynesis, worked to complexify and challenge the idea of “woman” as a catch-all metaphor for everything that escapes and defies Western monological thought. Her invention of the term gynesis (gyn- signifying woman, and -sis designating process) instead seeks to diagnose, critique, and transform “woman and the feminine into verbs at the interior of…narratives that are today experiencing a crisis of legitimation.” The crisis to which Jardine refers and to which her book responds is the debate between sameness and difference that postmodernist currents in France had resuscitated, as it had never truly been resolved. Jardine shows how these French thinkers were invested in theorizing the failure of the modernist project and moving its failed dialectic towards new theoretical horizons. At the time of its publication, the book was predicted to be both important and controversial. Indeed, Jardine’s identification of the concept of gynesis, in tandem with Toril Moi’s publication of Sexual/Textual Politics (1985) was instrumental in coining the term ‘French feminism.' According to Françoise Lionnet, the concept of gynesis still poses questions being answered by contemporary Francophone fiction. These, Jardine queries, include whether feminism, as a concept and practice, might be productively redefined as a way in which women can link up with other minoritized subjects within and against the dominant Western conceptual systems.

Jardine's publications during the 1980s contributed substantively to the emergence of the field of Women's Studies. Her co-edited volume, The Future of Difference (GK Hall, 1980) is still in print (Rutgers University Press, 1985) as an early example of the identity debates raging at the time. The same can be said of her co-edited Men in Feminism (Methuen, 1987). He co-translation of Julia Kristeva's Desire in Language (Columbia, 1980) was the first effort to bring Kristeva's work to an anglophone audience.

=== 1990s ===
In the 1990s, Jardine experienced a series of attacks from neoconservative and right-wing political commentators attempting to reify her teaching and scholarship as emblematic of symptoms of Leftist-driven cultural decay in the West. In 1991, Dinesh D’Souza visited her classroom, posing as a student, as part of his quest to attribute many modern social problems to “political correctness” in his book Illiberal Education. In her response article, “Illiberal Reporting,” Jardine first points out his hypocritical indebtedness to the same practice of radical hospitality and openness that allowed him to (he claims) infiltrate academia and fuel his campaign to discredit it. She also denounces DeSouza’s rhetorical posturing – a purported “higher obligation to truth unfettered by ideological predisposition” – that veils a deeply conservative agenda. “D’Souza and his right-wing followers are projecting onto the Left the mirror image of their own ‘political correctness’ agenda: homophobia, racism, sexism, and of course, ever finessed, classism/elitism.” She also notes his frequent use of auto-legitimizing rhetoric (self-characterizations like “commonsense,” “balanced,” and “forthright”) as an effort to claim “special access to empirical truth” as an alleged “defender of the American way of life.” While the book received a largely respectful reception from mainstream media, Jardine’s public rebuttal of DeSouza was one of the first to denounce his methods as bordering on conspiratorial, by pointing out how they similarly tend to undermine trust in democratic political institutions. DeSouza has since been officially categorized as a conspiracy theorist, denounced as a propaganda filmmaker, and imprisoned for fraud.

The bad-faith characterization of Jardine’s teaching – as what François Furet described as part of the closing of the American mind in an education system rife with “ideological orthodoxy” – was exported to France when accusations of political correctness came into vogue. A translation of Illiberal Education was printed by the prestigious Gallimard publishing company as L’éducation contre les libertés politiques de race et sexe (1993) and was widely accepted as an objective assessment of the state of affairs in the American academy. Jardine experienced another attack in this fact-flouting-free-for-all, when in an article from April 16, 1994, Figaro journalist Victor Loupan called Harvard, “the temple of political correctness.” In this same article, he claimed that of all the women faculty members in the French department, only she had “any semblance of university qualifications.” Of these, he only recognizes (and mocks) her translation of Julia Kristeva’s Desire in Language (1980), when in reality, Jardine was at that time the author of the critically acclaimed Gynesis (1985) and editor of four other books. The journal also claimed that Jardine taught only courses on homosexual women of color when in reality she taught no such courses. In response, Jardine and her colleague Susan Suleiman sued the Figaro for libel. Her lawyer delighted in spreading hers and Suleiman’s numerous books, articles, and diplomas over the advocate’s bench. Jardine officially won her lawsuit on May 12, 1995, with the French Supreme Court awarding her 150,000 francs, ruling that the paper had acted improperly in falsely reporting her academic credentials. Suleiman’s case was dismissed because a bailiff failed to deliver her court papers before the filing deadline. While not a significant amount in USD (about $30,000), the lawsuit handed down a symbolic verdict in the cultural frenzy to denounce the American academy. Jardine’s lawyer told her that the sum of damages was the highest amount Le Figaro had ever paid in a lawsuit. The win was significant because it sent a message: that with freedom comes responsibility, and that to libel or defame someone is unacceptable, by the very standards of democratic free thinking under whose auspices Le Figaro moved to discredit Jardine and cash in on the mediatic moment.

The decade ended with the shock of Jardine's name being used in an ugly, misogynistic monologue ad-libbed by Matt Damon in the 1998 hit film Saving Private Ryan. The story Damon's character tells about his brothers in the barn with "Alice Jardine" was not part of the original script; Damon improvised the entire monologue while filming. Critics have interpreted director Stephen Spielberg's inclusion of the improvised content in the blockbuster's final cut as a cinematic mechanism "humanizing" Damon's character, Ryan––"just an ordinary kid who was trying to survive a terrible war." This film trope serves as an example of the real-world phenomenon that British feminist writer Laura Bates has named "everyday sexism". The choice of Alice Jardine's name in the scene is an unlikely coincidence, with Damon having plausible familiarity with Harvard's Humanities faculty, as an English major in Harvard's class of '92 before he dropped out to pursue acting; his mother, Nancy Carlsson-Paige, was also a respected professor of early childhood education at Lesley University less than a mile away. Rachel Trubowitz, an English professor at the University of New Hampshire also known for her work on women writers, likewise saw her name employed in the film just prior to the "Alice Jardine" vignette, during another soldier's similarly casual misogynistic recollection. For a blockbuster that will circulate into infinity in a multitude of languages, and which, as scholars have argued, "presumes to provide its own context," this "penchant for mentioning scholars" by even a progressive actor like Damon was a particularly upsetting attack.

=== 2000s and beyond ===
The last twenty-plus years of Jardine's career at Harvard have been dedicated to building WGS at Harvard. Prior approval of a "Women's Studies" concentration had not translated to automatic and immediate institutional support, and yet Jardine solidified a thriving program with a team of faculty able to address a more internationally diverse set of issues. Despite receiving little administrative support during these earliest years, over time, she helped increase undergraduate concentrators and built a PhD program. Her published articles during the early 2000s tend to focus on the loss of several important feminist intellectual friends, e.g. philosopher Teresa Brennan (in "A Surplus of Living Attention"); Carolyn Heilbrun (in "The Invisible Woman in the Academy"); and Monique Wittig (in "Thinking Wittig's Difference"), culminating in her review of Anglo-American Feminism ("What Feminism?") The 2010s were dominated by her articles and public appearances focused on the work of Julia Kristeva, culminating in her prize-winning biography At the Risk of Thinking: An Intellectual Biography of Julia Kristeva (2020), due to appear in French translation from Editions Fayard, Paris.

Jardine retired from teaching in 2024. She continues to write, with her current project being a memoir of her twenties spent in Paris, Picaresque Paris: Bringing Theory Back to Life. She is devoting her activist energy towards efforts to mitigate climate change through organizations such as Third Act.
