= Evangelion: 3.0+1.0 Thrice Upon a Time =

2021 Japanese film

- Theatrical release poster

Japanese name
- Kanji: シン・エヴァンゲリオン劇場版: 𝄂
- Literal meaning: Shin Evangelion Theatrical Edition: 𝄂
Transcriptions
- Revised Hepburn: Shin Evangerion Gekijō-ban: 𝄂
- Directed by: Hideaki Anno; Kazuya Tsurumaki; Katsuichi Nakayama; Mahiro Maeda
- Screenplay by: Hideaki Anno
- Based on: Neon Genesis Evangelion by Hideaki Anno
- Starring: Megumi Ogata; Megumi Hayashibara; Yuko Miyamura; Maaya Sakamoto; Akira Ishida; Kotono Mitsuishi
- Cinematography: Toru Fukushi
- Edited by: Emi Tsujita
- Music by: Shirō Sagisu
- Production company: Studio Khara
- Distributed by: Toho; Toei Company, Ltd.; Khara, Inc.
- Release date: March 8, 2021
- Running time: 155 minutes
- Country: Japan
- Language: Japanese
- Budget: ¥3.26 billion ($29.7 million)
- Box office: ¥10.28 billion ($93.67 million)

Evangelion: 3.0+1.0 Thrice Upon a Time (Japanese: シン・エヴァンゲリオン劇場版: 𝄂, Hepburn: Shin (Note: The katakana for Shin in the film's title has a variety of meanings, including "new" (新), "true" (真), and "God" (神).) Evangerion Gekijō-ban: 𝄂; lit. 'Shin Evangelion Theatrical Edition: 𝄂') is a 2021 Japanese animated epic science fiction film co-directed and written by Hideaki Anno. Produced by Studio Khara, it is the fourth and final film in the Rebuild of Evangelion film series, part of the Neon Genesis Evangelion franchise.

After a protracted development and multiple delays, Thrice Upon a Time was released on March 8, 2021, and received critical acclaim, with praise given to the screenplay, animation, directing, themes, production design, voice-performances, emotional weight and satisfactory closures and answers. The film also was a box-office success, becoming the highest-grossing film of the franchise and the second-highest-grossing Japanese film of 2021 at ¥10.28 billion. It was released internationally on August 13 the same year via the Amazon Prime Video streaming service. On June 17, 2022, it was announced that GKIDS had acquired the North American rights to the film. The film was released to theaters in December 2022 and on home video in October 2023.

== Plot ==
In Paris, young crewmembers from the WILLE organization, led by Maya Ibuki, work to restore the city and its defensive systems. Upon being attacked by NERV forces, they are defended by the Wunder fleet and Mari Illustrious Makinami in Unit-08. Mari defeats the attackers, and WILLE restores Paris.

Asuka Langley Shikinami, Rei Ayanami and a still despondent Shinji Ikari are walking across the outskirts of Tokyo-3, arriving at a settlement of survivors where they encounter Toji Suzuhara, Hikari Horaki and Kensuke Aida, now adults. Toji is a doctor and has a child with Hikari, while Kensuke is a technician. As Shinji slowly recovers from his ordeals, Rei settles into the village working as a farmer, finding happiness. Shinji meets Ryoji Kaji Jr., the son of Misato Katsuragi and the late Ryoji Kaji, who died averting Third Impact. Rei, lacking the constant exposure to LCL fluid required to stay alive, says goodbye to Shinji before dissolving away.

Wunder arrives to pick up Asuka and Shinji, the latter being placed in isolation. Meanwhile, Kozo Fuyutsuki helps Gendo Ikari restart Unit-13. In response, Wunder heads to Antarctica. Before the mission, Asuka and Shinji reconcile: Asuka admits her feelings for Shinji, while Shinji apologizes to Asuka for being indecisive in saving her from the Ninth Angel fourteen years ago.

Wunder is attacked by three NERV ships and a swarm of EVA units. Asuka and Mari sortie and move to destroy Unit-13 before it can reactivate. However, Unit-02 refuses to attack Unit-13, forcing Asuka to remove her eyepatch, revealing the Ninth Angel contained within, converting Unit-02 into an EVA-Angel hybrid like Shinji's Unit-01. Unit-13 overpowers and absorbs Unit-02 according to Gendo's plan. Moments before being absorbed, Asuka is approached by her "original", revealing she is a clone of the Shikinami series. Meanwhile, Wunder is attacked by a new EVA, Unit-09A.

In the NERV vessel restraining Wunder, Misato and Ritsuko Akagi confront Gendo. Ritsuko shoots him to no effect, as Gendo has used the Key of Nebuchadnezzar to transcend humanity. He reveals that the purpose of the Shikinami and Ayanami clones was to enact the Human Instrumentality Project, SEELE's conspiracy to force human evolution, and enters Unit-13. Shinji asks Misato to let him pilot Unit-01; Sakura and Midori Kitakami try to stop Shinji, blaming him for the Near Third Impact, but Misato protects him and is shot in the process. Misato reminds everyone of Shinji's heroism and that he should be forgiven. Mari takes Unit-08 and merges it with Units 09A through 12. Inside Unit-01, Shinji fondly reunites with the original Rei, who gives him control.

Gendo and Shinji fight in a surreal "Anti Universe", and Gendo shows Shinji the "Black Lilith" that he will use to initiate the "Additional Impact". Shinji sees into Gendo's past experiences, including how Yui's loss traumatized him. As a result, Gendo wanted this "Additional Impact" for a chance to reunite with Yui. Meanwhile, Misato evacuates the crew of Wunder and sacrifices herself and the ship to create the "Lance of Gaius", which gives Shinji the power to rewrite the world. Shinji talks with and provides closure to Gendo; to Asuka, he returns her feelings; with Kaworu Nagisa, he discovers the existence of a cycle the story's cast is trapped in. Kaworu also talks with a resurrected Kaji, who helps him understand that his own happiness shall not be tied to Shinji's.

Shinji says farewell to Rei, deciding upon a complete reset of the world where everyone can live normal lives without EVAs: a "Neon Genesis". Gendo and Yui sacrifice themselves to spare Shinji from doing so himself, bringing back all humans and animals transformed in the Near Third Impact and restoring the world. Shinji waits on a beach until Mari appears, during which her Evangelion becomes the last to disappear. Kaworu and the former pilots meet at a train station, where Shinji and Mari run off in the real world.

== Voice cast ==
Character	Japanese	English
Shinji Ikari	Megumi Ogata; Ryunosuke Kamiki (adult)	Spike Spencer
Asuka Langley Shikinami	Yūko Miyamura	Tiffany Grant
Rei Ayanami	Megumi Hayashibara	Amanda Winn-Lee
Misato Katsuragi	Kotono Mitsuishi	Allison Keith
Gendo Ikari	Fumihiko Tachiki	John Swasey
Mari Illustrious Makinami	Maaya Sakamoto	Deneen Melody
Sakura Suzuhara	Miyuki Sawashiro	Felecia Angelle
Ritsuko Akagi	Yuriko Yamaguchi	Mary Faber
Kaworu Nagisa	Akira Ishida	Daman Mills
Toji Suzuhara	Tomokazu Seki	Brett Weaver
Kensuke Aida	Tetsuya Iwanaga	Alejandro Saab
Hikari Suzuhara	Junko Iwao	Kimberly Yates
Maya Ibuki	Miki Nagasawa	Amy Seeley
Kozo Fuyutsuki	Motomu Kiyokawa	Michael Ross
Ryoji Kaji Sr.	Kōichi Yamadera	Sean Burgos
Midori Kitakami	Mariya Ise	Bijou Vann
Shigeru Aoba	Takehito Koyasu	Jaxon Lee
Makoto Hyuga	Hiro Yuuki	Joe Fria
Yui Ikari	Megumi Hayashibara	Amanda Winn-Lee
Ryoji Kaji Jr.^{[*]}	Kōki Uchiyama	
Kohji Takao	Akio Otsuka	Jake Eberle
Hideki Tama	Anri Katsu	Scott Golden
Sumire Nagara	Sayaka Ohara	Rebeka Thomas

New character

== Production ==
=== Early development and delays ===
The film was announced alongside Evangelion: 3.0 You Can (Not) Redo for release in 2008 as the final part of the Rebuild series under the working title Evangelion: Final. After delays of the first three films, production on Evangelion: Final formally started in 2009, with a release date expected in 2015. However, in 2014, following the troubled production of the third film, director and producer Hideaki Anno became depressed and announced that the film would be further delayed to an unknown date, stating publicly in 2015 that he could not work on another film. As part of his recovery, Anno had also worked on Studio Ghibli's The Wind Rises under his mentor Hayao Miyazaki. Toho (which co-distributes the film in Japan with Toei) also approached Anno with an offer to direct a reboot of its Godzilla film series, Shin Godzilla, which also contributed to the delay on 3.0+1.0. Getting Toei and Toho in the same film had been a long-standing dream of Anno's. After Anno formally apologized, animation director Takeshi Honda stated that the last film had resumed development after the production of Shin Godzilla ended in late 2016, with Studio Khara tweeting on April 5, 2017, that development was going smoothly.

In May 2018, the studio put out a job listing for animation staff to work on 3DCG, VFX, and 2D animation starting on June 30, 2018. Animation was going through the final check by October 2, 2020. Dialogue recording wrapped on November 19, 2020. On December 16, 2020, Studio Khara announced that compositing and editing work had finished.

Financial troubles also played a part in the film's delays. In 2014, Anno's Studio Khara loaned his former company Studio Gainax ¥100 million ($916,400). In 2016, Anno filed a claim for debt collection, fearing not only for the return of the money but also because of Gainax selling production materials to third parties, after a precedent of other sales of intellectual property without informing him. This was part of several legal issues surrounding Gainax and Evangelion.

=== Development ===
Anno was very reluctant to return to work on the film in 2016. In 2018, Anno had asked for the opinion of voice actors like Megumi Ogata (Shinji) on how to move the plot forward after 3.0, as he felt he could no longer understand Shinji, and by now, his current self was closer to Gendo than Shinji, and needed Ogata's input on how Shinji could recover after the events of 3.0. Anno felt that at that point the only people who could understand Shinji's feelings were Ogata herself and his personal assistant, Ikki Todoroki. Anno himself had intended to go to Paris for Japan Expo 2019, but the film's continuing delays in production prevented him. Anno had often visited the film's music composer Shirō Sagisu, who lives half the year in Paris, and wished to pay homage to the city in the opening 10 minutes of the movie, entitled AVANT1 ("before" in French), seeking to surpass his earlier depiction in Nadia: The Secret of Blue Water. At the event, Ogata also recounted Anno had asked what ending she preferred "as Shinji". AVANT1+2, including a further 2 minutes of the opening sequence, was also streamed on Khara's YouTube channel and Japanese Amazon Prime Video for free for two weeks.

Dialogue for Parts A and B, set after AVANT, started recording in March 2019. As there were several changes to the plot, many voice actors had to come back and record lines again. In 2020, due to the pandemic restrictions, production slowed down further and recording was mostly done by the voice actors separately as many dozens of takes were necessary: Ogata first notified the recording as almost finished in February 2020, but as production slowed down, staff began retouching several aspects of the film, and Ogata later noted recording to be finished in November 2020. The voice actors organized themselves through a Line group. This created a bond between the cast that was unprecedented in previous productions. At the end of recording, Anno thanked the cast for their contributions. Yūko Miyamura, who played Asuka, was instructed to treat her character as completely separate from the series' Asuka Langley Soryu, and the last thing asked of her was to write the character's full name in cursive herself to be used in the movie. She had lived in Australia for the past two decades, but was still unsure of how to write "Langley". Miyamura expressed her surprise at Anno's behavior near the end of production, in contrast to his behavior during the making of End of Evangelion: "Anno-san is amazing. He has become an adult".

Anno sought to bring in new talent and people outside the usual Evangelion core crew, like Darling in the Franxx creator Atsushi Nishigori, a protégé of his, while other core staffers like chief editor Masayuki largely stepped down in order to allow new talents to gain more experience. In addition, the series' original character designer, Yoshiyuki Sadamoto, has had diminishing involvement since 3.0, and the new character designs are mostly done by Hidenori Matsubara. Anno had long stated his wish to revitalize the anime industry, and saw the sponsorship of new creators as a prime way of achieving this, as well as the promotions of events backed by Studio Khara like the Japan Animator Expo. Director Mahiro Maeda recounted Anno wanted him to figure out specific details of the plot on his own when asked. Similarly to production in the series, Anno would take ideas from staffers but have the final word in plot decisions. Anno had also been an advocate of employing new and innovative animation technologies, combined with extensive use of motion capture and computer-generated imagery, and employed them in the film. Maeda and others noted nonetheless that Anno seemed to be directing the film more like a live action film than animation, including in the way he directed the voice actors, taking cues from theatre techniques, after his previous experience outside Evangelion, despite the staff's own limited experience, something he had previously attempted in Cutie Honey. He thought Anno "wanted to get out of here the most", but expressed his feelings in film sincerely.

Director Kazuya Tsurumaki details Anno wanted to try a new process for the film. Instead of first creating storyboards and then developing the animation based on them as is traditional, Anno proposed to first draw the animation cels and then draw the scenes from them. This technique was generally referred to by staff as "pre-visualization". He was once more inspired from the usual process in live action, where scenes are first shot from multiple angles and then stories are created and then selected during editing. The latter half of the film, however, progressively returned to the traditional anime style. Tsurumaki noted the original intention was that "the first 80%" of the Rebuild series would be a "compilation" of the original anime series, and the changes would only start with the last film, in keeping with earlier comments in 2006 by producer Toshimichi Ohtsuki regarding the intention that only the ending would be a major departure from the series, as staff felt End of Evangelion could not receive a sequel, and the Rebuild movies were not going to be "metaphysical" like the original anime, but rather "oriented towards entertainment". In 2006, Anno also stated in an interview that 2.0 and 3.0. a two-parter including a new-finale akin to End of Evangelion, would both be released by 2008. Again he revealed his Gundam inspiration, specifically from Zeta Gundam New Translation, which had itself received a compilation/remake at around the same time.

This eventually changed, and major changes started happening as early as Evangelion: 2.0 You Can (Not) Advance. He also noted that the previously stated goal of "destroying Evangelion" through the character of Mari was entrusted to an external party. Anno would ask the opinion of many parts of staff, including those not involved in the actual film like office staff for their opinions on several nuances. Anno's wife Moyoco Anno provided early designs for some characters. Studio Ghibli also provided assistance to scenes set in the survivor's village. For the village itself, Khara had a box model custom-built to orientate the artists, and Anno personally adjusted it to the smallest details like individual house layout, with road and utility posts to make it as realistic as possible. Staff consulted with multiple professionals and conducted research like sky-diving for maximum accuracy.

A making-of documentary aired on Japanese broadcaster NHK on March 22, 2021, with the crew following production for 1214 days. BS Japan also broadcast an extended version of the documentary on April 29, 2021, totaling 100 minutes of runtime, featuring unused footage. Amazon Prime Video included the extended version of documentary in its international release of the film in August. When production started in 2016, Anno initially intended to not involve himself much in the film, wishing to delegate most of it to his directors, particularly Tsurumaki, generally considered Khara's second-in-command, but as the release date approached with mounting production problems he progressively took more control and took on more tasks directly, also driven by his perfectionism. Maeda was also not initially serving as a director, but was brought in the middle of production. Kim Morrisy of Anime News Network described it as tumultuous: "There were several occasions shown when he decided that the work he had done at the time was insufficient and would scrap it entirely. The [final] D part of the script was eventually completed in early 2019, at the latest possible stage it could have been done to meet the deadline."

In the documentary, Anno is depicted as frequently late or absent from the studio, or would often stay overnight adjusting individual scenes he was unsatisfied with. Part A had been rewritten 40 times due to the difficulty staff had in depicting it, and at one point Anno was so lost on how to resolve the storylines he considered restarting it from scratch after nine months of work. Anno told the documentary crew he would not miss working on the franchise and said everything he needed to, but felt finishing his work remained a priority, even at the expense of his well-being. He told Ogata later at post-production that he would indeed miss it. Hayao Miyazaki described Anno as "one who sheds blood for his films". Upon finishing production, Anno preferred to immediately start work on a script for a new production while his staff was watching the first screening together. Gainax co-founder Toshio Okada criticized the documentary as "sloppy" and "propaganda" trying to make Anno look better, claiming Anno's live-action approach in fact took inspiration from Hiroyuki Yamaga's work in Royal Space Force: The Wings of Honnêamise instead of being sui generis as the documentary implied, and Anno noted the crew was in fact not present during the highly intense production of Part D for several months, nor did it cover him thanking the staff at the end.

On March 28, 2021, the cast was fully reunited for the first time in 14 years and held a stage greeting, commenting on the film and their bond to the characters. On April 12, 2021, directors Anno, Tsurumaki and Maeda, as well as Ogata, held another stage greeting. On June 26, 2021, Anno held a live stream on singer Hikaru Utada's Instagram page, and debated the film. The cast and directors also participated in the All Night Nippon radio show on June 22, 2021. On June 27, 2021, another cast greeting was held. Mari's voice actress Maaya Sakamoto explained she had been absent from the previous events because she felt apprehensive over the details she knew about Mari's character that Anno told her, but refused to share them: "I will take secrets to my grave". A last stage greeting was held on July 11, 2021. Anno felt he had now done everything he could with anime, and accordingly Khara denied reports that he was working on a reboot of a popular animation series. He also noted he initially attempted a shorter two hour runtime, but had to extend it.

Anno had originally intended on making a new Evangelion story since 2000 and has intended to open up the franchise in the future to new creators and turn Eva into a "new Gundam", using the Rebuilds as a foundation for this, but 3.0+1.0 is intended to be his final Evangelion work. The Animator Expo already featured three independent works based on the franchise: Evangelion – Another Impact and Neon Genesis IMPACTS, as well as until You come to me, a short film intended to showcase the talent of younger Khara animators, not as an official trailer. In an interview in August 2021, Anno stated other parts of the franchise and story might be revisited later. Staff also commented on doubts over this being the "end of the story". On the film's first anniversary on March 8, Khara held a livestream of the film and included a Q&A session with Anno and other staff reaffirming his future plans.

== Music ==
The film's theme song is "One Last Kiss". The song, performed by Hikaru Utada and co-produced by Utada and A. G. Cook, was scheduled to be released for digital download on January 24, 2021, and as an extended play CD and LP record featuring remastered versions of the previous Rebuild of Evangelion theme songs on January 27. It was released alongside the film on March 9, 2021, and internationally in the summer. Utada noted this was the first time they wrote the song's lyrics based on reading a finished version of the film's script, instead of simply skimming over early rough drafts. Anno also directed the music video for the song.

A soundtrack album, titled Shiro Sagisu Music from "Shin Evangelion", was scheduled to be released on February 10, 2021, but was also delayed due to the delay of the film. It was released on March 17. The 3-disc score utilized several revamped tracks from Sagisu's previous works for Anno, like Nadia: The Secret of Blue Water and Kare Kano, as well as featuring cover versions of "VOYAGER ~ Hizuke no Nai Bohyou" by Megumi Hayashibara, originally written and performed by Yumi Matsutoya for 1984's Bye-Bye Jupiter, and a cue from 1977's The War in Space, originally composed by Toshiaki Tsushima.

A vocal song based on the track "what if?: orchestra, choir and piano" from the soundtrack album titled "Shiro SAGISU << what if? >> Yoko TAKAHASHI ver." was released as a digital single on August 31, featuring Yoko Takahashi and arrangements by Sagisu himself.

== Release ==
On July 6, 2019, Khara screened the first ten minutes of the film at Japan Expo in Paris, Anime Expo in Los Angeles and CCG Expo 2019 in Shanghai. The film was originally scheduled for release on June 27, 2020.

In April 2020, it was announced that the film had been removed from the schedule due to concerns regarding the COVID-19 pandemic, and the film was later rescheduled for release on January 23, 2021. The theatrical release poster was revealed shortly afterwards with the tagline "Bye-bye, all of EVANGELION.", indicating that this would likely be Anno's final Evangelion-related project. Anno released a statement via Studio Khara's Twitter in October apologizing for the delay while confirming the film was near completion. Khara suggested the run time of the finished film could be over two hours, with the "D-part" clocking in at 41 minutes. They also reported that as of October 2 the film was undergoing a "rush check", a final check of the animation before editing. On January 14, 2021, the film was removed from the release calendar again. On February 16, 2021, it was reported that the film would be 154 minutes long, making it the longest film in the Rebuild tetralogy and one of the longest animated feature films ever.

On February 26, Hikaru Utada's staff account on Twitter reported that the film's feature song "One Last Kiss" would be released on March 8, 2021, with a link to their website with more information confirming a new release date for the film of March 8, 2021. This was also confirmed on Studio Khara's website, along with a runtime of 155 minutes. A day before the first screenings, fans managed to hack into a closed caption app intended for visual and hearing impaired audiences, extracting the full subtitle and audio tracks, which prompted further attention.

=== Updated release ===
An updated version of the film, titled Evangelion: 3.0+1.01 Thrice Upon a Time, was released in Japanese theaters on June 12, 2021. This version features updated cuts of various scenes while not changing the overall story of the film. It also accompanied the distribution of a 36-page booklet called Eva-Extra-Extra, including non-canon illustrations by staff and a prequel manga set before the events of the previous film, Evangelion: 3.0 You Can (Not) Redo, called Evangelion: 3.0 (-120min.), written by director Kazuya Tsurumaki under Anno's supervision. The manga was Anno's initiative, and began production on April 11.

Internationally, Amazon Prime Video acquired exclusive streaming rights to the film; it was released in worldwide on August 13, 2021, excluding Japan. However, on July 20, 2021, Amazon Prime Video announced that it will also stream the film in Japan on the same day as its international release. It featured full re-dubbings of the previous Rebuild films, including several voice actors from the A.D. Vision and Manga Entertainment localizations of the original series and films, in place of the mostly new cast used in the Funimation adaptations of the Rebuild series and Netflix's adaptation of the series. Like Netflix's release, it also included a full re-translation by Khara's in-house translator, Dan Kanemitsu.

GKIDS acquired the rights for theatrical releases of the film in North America. The film was released in the United States on IMAX in select theaters on November 30, 2022, followed by a nationwide release on December 6, 8, and 11. It was released in the United Kingdom by All The Anime on October 6, 2023.

=== Home media ===
On October 4, 2022, Khara announced a home media release for March 8, 2023, on the film's second anniversary, titled 3.0+1.11. Its limited edition includes several bonus materials, like a copy of the script signed by Hideaki Anno. All editions also accompany a bonus feature short video called Evangelion: 3.0 (-46h), along with a re-release of the manga Evangelion 3.0 (-120 min.) in video format in full color and voiced by the original cast. In North America, GKIDS also acquired home media rights to the film, with a release on October 17, 2023.

== Reception ==
=== Box office ===
Anno stated his desire to see 3.0+1.0 break the ¥10 billion mark, which he considered would be a landmark for robot anime. The film was released in Japan on March 8, 2021, earning ¥802,774,200 ($7,387,198) on its first day, outdoing its predecessor by 23.8% and breaking the IMAX opening day record in Japan. The film grossed ¥3,338,422,400 ($30,596,851) in its first week, ranking No. 1 in Japan in its opening week. In 21 days, the film sold 3,961,480 tickets and grossed ¥6,078,211,750 ($55,492,310) in Japan, outdoing 3.0's total earnings of ¥5.3 billion. In 30 days, it surpassed ¥7 billion ($63.77 million), completing four weeks as #1 in Japanese box offices. On May 8, it surpassed Shin Godzilla and became Anno's highest-grossing film at ¥8.28 billion ($75.72 million). With the 3.0+1.01 updated release on June 12, the film jumped back to top box office spot after spending a weekend out of the top 10 chart and on June 15, exactly the 100th day since release, achieving a 960.5% increase, reached ¥9 billion ($81.7 million). On July 13, it was announced that the film has exceeded ¥10 billion, becoming the first ever film distributed by Toei to hit this box office milestone and ending its theatrical run on July 21 pocketing ¥10.23 billion with an attendance number of 6.69 million people, finishing with almost double as its predecessor's ¥5.3 billion mark. Japanese Twitter archival site Fusetter had its all-time highest view count on March 9. After the film's August streaming release, it broke Amazon Prime Video's all-time high day-one view amount since its launch in Japan. By December 2021, the movie became the highest-grossing movie of the year in Japan, accounting for over ¥10.2 billion (about US$89.5 million). The film has grossed a Japanese box office total of ¥10.28 billion ($93.67 million).

=== Critical response ===
Japanese reception has been highly positive. The Asahi Shimbun released a series of reviews from Japanese academics and critics. Hiroki Azuma praised the film as a "grand masterpiece", and thought it was nearly impossible for the film to respond to all the "burden" it carried, but it did so successfully. He considered that, although it outwardly looks like a science fiction film, it is in reality a confessional I-novel by Anno. Commenting on Anno's style, anime director Mamoru Oshii shared this perception, and considered that Anno is "more of a producer than a director these days" and felt that he lacked a theme. In a later interview with comedian Hitoshi Matsumoto, Anno himself later echoed this, saying that as a director he could afford to be a child, but not after he started producing. Akiko Sugawa praised the portrayal of its female characters. Japanese aggregator site Eiga.com and others praised the movie for fulfilling its promise of being easily approachable to a viewer not familiar with the original Neon Genesis Evangelion, reiterating its role as a stand-alone story, but also likening it to the series' status as a pop culture phenomenon in view of the many emerging analyses, a view shared by the cast. On aggregator site Filmmarks, the film attained the highest first-day satisfaction score in its history.

Reviewers also noted the film's deeply divided reception among Evangelion fans, with the ending proving particularly controversial. Gainax co-founder Toshio Okada promulgated an association between the character of Mari and Anno's wife Moyoco, and was rebuffed by significant backlash from Khara staff, Moyoco, and Anno himself, who instead pointed out Tsurumaki's responsibility for developing her and similarities to his earlier characters from FLCL and Diebuster, which shared her voice actress, and Anno's detachment from her creation. Similarly to End of Evangelion, reviewers considered the film to have the theme of "moving into reality", but were divided on the effectiveness of its execution and the resolution of its plot lines. Bunshun Online concluded that unlike the 1997 film, 3.0+1.0 did not intend to give viewers a mystery to solve, but to provide a more straightforward answer. Writers for Yahoo! Japan and others agreed on its distinctiveness from the previous work, reflecting a different cultural context and personal state of Hideaki Anno, speculating his time at Ghibli had greatly influenced him, with a less multifaceted story where Shinji's character had been completely "consumed" by Anno attempting to break the "Otaku curse" represented in-story by the "Curse of Evangelion", and considered the ending could only be explained with background knowledge on Anno's life, and how this controversy would likely drive more heated discussion in the near future, with fan backlash coming even at small subsequent statements by Anno and other staff. Writer Ichisi Lida concluded he could not decide if he liked the film or not, but felt if he watched it again after some years, he would think it was a bad film, not feeling the same feeling of confusion mixed with amazement as 1997's End of Evangelion or its 2012 predecessor Evangelion 3.0. Lida expressed disappointment at a "sense of déjà vu", characterizing the film as a self-imitation of Anno's past works. Lida felt that Shinji's maturing was not surprising, but expected, as he had already gone through that process with the 1997 film. Similarly, he noted how the generation that grew up with the Rebuild films could feel like their own coming-of-age would be marked by the film, but for an older fan such as himself, that had already happened with the 1997 movie. Anno had partly re-created his hometown of Ube as it existed during his youth for the ending scene, prompting tourism from fans to the town.

In contrast to the negative reception of its predecessor Evangelion: 3.0 You Can (Not) Redo, Western critical reception has been extremely positive. As of January 2024, it holds a 100% score and an average score of 8.60/10 on review aggregator Rotten Tomatoes with 29 reviews. The website's critic consensus states, "With its characteristic boldness, Evangelion:3.0+1.01 more than thricely rewards fans with a cathartic finale to the 26-year-old iconic anime tale." According to Metacritic, which calculated a weighted average score of 84 out of 100 based on 7 critics' reviews, the film received "universal acclaim". Richard Eisenbeis of Anime News Network noted the film's close connections with End of Evangelion on a thematic and narrative level and praised its characterization, while also noting its different themes, but criticized its world-building, and also the lack of development given to Mari to justify her role in the plot. Kyle McLain of IGN praised the film for having themes of maturity, hope and positivity, but disliked the final act as "inscrutable". Matt Schley of The Japan Times shared his opinion, saying: "Thrice is not the charm for those hoping for a definitive, easy-to-understand ending for Evangelion. Like its predecessors, 3.0+1.0 raises more questions than it answers. Time is a circle." Justin Harrison of The Spool called it "a deeply moving motion picture". SoraNews24 expressed puzzlement at the ending, but noted the film is "complex, hits different people in different ways, and is something that immediately triggers a repeat-viewing reaction". Crunchyroll's Daryl Harding noticed the film "goes pretty meta" and praised its direction, but repeatedly criticized the animation. Otaquest's Chris Cimi noted the film builds an aesthetic that is meaningfully different from the series' "iconic visual language", to a point of contention: "The CG sure does look like CG". Andrew Osmond of NEO felt that although there were things about the film that felt "indulgent, pandering, and flat-out dumb", he felt satisfied with the film, noting a resolution of Evangelion's baseline conflict, and felt the film managed to synthesize Anno's previous efforts into a coherent and touching ending. Although he believed the Evangelion franchise has been "bolder and more brilliant in the past", he stated that the film "brings it to a beautiful ending".

The film has won the 45th Japan Academy Film Prize, and animated film categories at the Tokyo Anime Film Festival, with Anno winning the original screenplay and director categories.

The film ranks on Rotten Tomatoes' Best Science Fiction Movies of 2021.

=== Awards and honours ===
Year	Award	Category	Result
2022	45th Japan Academy Film Prize	Best Animation Film	Won
2022	45th Japan Academy Film Prize	Most Popular Film	Won
2022	27th Manga Barcelona Awards	Best anime movie premiere on platforms/TV	Won
2022	6th Crunchyroll Anime Awards	Best Film	Nominated
2022	Tokyo Anime Awards	Animation of the Year	Won

== Post-release ==
=== Collaborative projects ===
In February 2022, a collaborative project titled "Shin Japan Heroes Universe" was announced. A joint venture between Khara, Toei Company, Toho Co., Ltd., and Tsuburaya Productions, the project is intended for merchandising purposes; uniting films that Anno had worked on that bear the katakana title "Shin" (シン・), such as Shin Godzilla, Evangelion: 3.0+1.0 Thrice Upon a Time, Shin Ultraman, and Shin Kamen Rider.
