= Françoise Lionnet =

Mauritian professor at Harvard University

- Born: Mauritius
- Education: PhD, University of Michigan
- Occupations: professor, essayist, scholar
- Writing career
- Subjects: Mascarene Islands, Francophone studies, comparative literature, feminism, postcolonial studies, African studies, autobiography
- Notable works: Autobiographical Voices: Race, Gender, Self-Portraiture; Postcolonial Representations: Women, Literature, Identity

Françoise Lionnet serves as acting chair of the Committee on Degrees in Studies of Women, Gender and Sexuality at Harvard University, where she is professor of Romance languages and literatures, comparative literature, and African and African American studies. She is distinguished research professor of comparative literature and French and Francophone studies at UCLA, and a research associate of the Centre for Indian Studies in Africa at the University of Witwatersrand, Johannesburg. She served as director of the African Studies Center and Program Co-Director of UCLA's Mellon Postdoctoral Fellowship in the Humanities: Cultures in Transnational Perspective.

She is a leading scholar in Francophone and comparative literary studies, and has published groundbreaking work in the fields of feminist literature, postcolonial studies, autobiography, and African, African-American, Caribbean and Mascarene Island studies. She is the former president of the ACLA.

== Early life ==
Lionnet was born in Mauritius, to a Franco-Mauritian and Seychellois family. She grew up speaking French and Creole, and learned English at the age of 4. This, in addition to the island's multicultural society and her diverse educational experience, has informed her research interests and comparatist approach throughout her career. Educated in Mauritius, Reunion Island, France, England, Germany, and the US, she received her PhD from the University of Michigan and was a postdoctoral fellow at the Cornell Society for the Humanities.

== Career ==
Prior to joining Harvard in 2015, Lionnet taught at UCLA (1998–2015), where she chaired the French Department (1999–2005). She held the Pierce Miller Professorship in Literary Studies at Northwestern University until 1998. Her numerous honors include visiting and special professorships at Duke University, University of Nottingham, UK, and the EHESS in Paris. In 2015, she was the Mary Cornille Distinguished Visiting Professor, Newhouse Humanities Center, at Wellesley College.

Her most recent books include Ecriture féminines et dialogues critiques. Subjectivité, genre et ironie (Mauritius; l'Atelier d'écriture, 2012) and Le su et l'incertain: Cosmopolitiques créoles de l'océan Indien (Mauritius: L'Atelier d'écriture, 2012), which have been recognized in an article on UCLA Today. In 2018, she published Evariste Parny: Selected Poetry and Prose, on the Creole abolitionist poet from Reunion Island.

She has edited and co-edited volumes for literary journals including Yale French Studies, Signs, L'Esprit créateur, Comparative Literary Studies, MLN, and International Journal of Francophone Studies. In addition to editing, Lionnet has been a regular contributor to these and many other scholarly journals throughout her career.

== Works ==
- Lionnet, Françoise (1989). Autobiographical Voices: Race, Gender, Self-Portraiture. Ithaca: Cornell University Press. ISBN 0801499275.
- Lionnet, Françoise (2005). Minor Transnationalism. Durham: Duke University Press. ISBN 0822334909.
- Lionnet, Françoise (1995). Postcolonial Representations: Women, Literature, Identity. Ithaca, New York: Cornell University Press. ISBN 0801481805.
- Lionnet, Françoise (2011). The Creolization of Theory. Durham NC: Duke University Press. ISBN 978-0822348467.
- Lionnet, Françoise (2012). Écritures féminines et dialogues critiques : subjectivité, genre et ironie. Trou d'Eau Douce, Ile Maurice: l'Atelier d'ecriture. ISBN 978-9990336689.
- Lionnet, Françoise (2012). Le su et l'incertain : cosmopolitiques créoles de l'océan Indien. Trou d'Eau Douce, Ile Maurice: l'Atelier d'ecriture. ISBN 978-9990336696.

== Selected awards ==
- Distinguished Lecturer, Center for African Studies, University of Bayreuth, Germany (2016)
- Distinguished Visiting Professor, Faculty of Arts and Social Sciences, Carleton University, Ottawa, Canada (2014)
- Distinguished Mellon Visiting Professor, Univ. of Witwatersrand, South Africa (2013)
- Principal Investigator, HED/USAID Grant for Educational Project in Rwanda (2012–15)
- Northrop Frye Distinguished Lecture, Univ. of Toronto (2010)
- Principal Co-PI, University of California Multi-Campus Research Group (2000–05)
- Principal Co-PI, "Cultures%20in%20Transnational%20Perspective"%20Postdoc%20Program%5D Mellon Foundation grant for the "Cultures in Transnational Perspective" Postdoc Program (2005–15)
- French Gov. Award: Chevalier de l'Ordre des Palmes Académiques, 2004
- Residency fellowship at the Rockefeller Foundation, Bellagio Center, June 2003
- Best Mentor Award from Women in French (WIF), 2002
- Professor Lionnet has held fellowships and grants from the Cornell Society for the Humanities, the American Philosophical Society, the Fulbright Foundation, the SSRC, the United Nations Fund (UNFPA), the UCHRI, the Humanities Research Institute at the University of California-Irvine, the Center for Advanced Feminist Studies at the University of Minnesota, and the NEH.
- Director NEH/Northwestern Summer Institute in French Cultural Studies, 1995.
