= List of Neon Genesis Evangelion chapters =

Cover of the first tankōbon volume of the Neon Genesis Evangelion manga

Several manga series have been developed, based on the anime series Neon Genesis Evangelion, created by Gainax. While the first manga is a direct adaptation of the anime series, the following ones are spin-off series with several differences.

The first manga from the series is entitled simply Neon Genesis Evangelion, written and illustrated by Yoshiyuki Sadamoto, who also worked in the character designs from the anime. The manga closely follows the anime story with few changes made to the characters or certain events. The series was serialized in Shōnen Ace from Kadokawa Shoten starting in 1995, but it was put on hiatus until July 2009 when it resumed in the first issue of Kadokawa's Young Ace. The series finally concluded with its 95th chapter in June 2013.

Additionally, Fumino Hayashi authored the spin-off series called Neon Genesis Evangelion: Angelic Days, which focuses on the romantic relationships between the main characters. Kadokawa Shoten serialized the series in Monthly Asuka and collected the series into six tankōbon volumes. The volumes were published from February 17, 2004, to December 17, 2005. In the United States, Newtype USA serialized the series, while ADV Manga released the six volumes. Another series having a similar focus is Neon Genesis Evangelion: Shinji Ikari Raising Project, authored by Osamu Takahashi. Shōnen Ace had published the chapters from June 2005 to February 2016, with 18 tankōbon having been released. Dark Horse Comics has licensed the series for English release, while the first volume was released on July 8, 2009.

Min Min has also authored Neon Genesis Evangelion: Campus Apocalypse, which uses the same setting from the manga series, but a big difference from the Evangelions and the main characters. It was published in Monthly Asuka from October 2007 to December 2009, and it has been collected into four tankōbon volumes.

Another manga named Neon Genesis Evangelion: The Shinji Ikari Detective Diary started serialization in Asuka's February 24, 2010 issue and is authored by Takumi Yoshimura in collaboration with Gainax and Khara. As the title indicates, this series re-envisions Shinji as a detective. Volume one was released by Dark Horse Comics in September 2013.

A light novel series Neon Genesis Evangelion: ANIMA was serialized from January 2008 to April 2013 in Dengeki Hobby Magazine from ASCII Media Works. The series is set in an alternate future diverging from the events of the anime. The novel begins 3 years after the end of the Human Instrumentality Project, replacing episodes 25 and 26 of the anime, as well as the End of Evangelion film. Seven Seas Entertainment published the light novel series Neon Genesis Evangelion: ANIMA for the first time in North America in print and on digital platforms in single volume editions. Volume 1 was released on October 29, 2019.

== Volumes ==
=== Neon Genesis Evangelion ===
| No. | Title | Original release date | English release date |
|---|---|---|---|
| 1 | Behold the angels of God descending "Angel Attack" (使徒、襲来, "Shito, Shūrai") | August 29, 1995; 978-4-04-713115-6 | February 25, 2004; 978-1-59116-400-5 |
Stage 01: "Angel Attack" (使徒、襲来, "Shito, Shūrai"); Stage 02: "Reunion" (再会..., "Saikai..."); Stage 03: "Unit-01, Lift Off" (初号機、出撃, "Shogōki, Rifuto Ofu"); Stage 04: "Silence..." (沈黙..., "Chinmoku..."); Stage 05: "Angel Fire" (光の淵に見たもの, "Hikari no Fuchi ni Mitamono"); Stage 06: "I...Cry..." (ボクハナク, "Boku wa Naku")
In the year 2015, fifteen years after a global cataclysm known as the Second Impact, teenager Shinji Ikari travels to Tokyo-3 at the behest of his estranged father, Gendo. While meeting with Misato Katsuragi, a woman who works for Gendo, the city is attacked by a giant creature known as an Angel. Misato takes Shinji to Nerv, an organization headed by Gendo that has developed giant bio-mechanical mecha known as Evangelions. As Evangelion Unit-01's pilot, Rei Ayanami, is wounded, Gendo asks his son to take her place. Shinji decides to fight the Angel, named Sachiel, but panics when he first sees it. During the fight, Shinji makes Unit-01 furiously attack Sachiel, which self-destructs, causing minor damage to the Eva. Next day, Misato discovers that Gendo is not planning to live with Shinji. Therefore, she decides to become Shinji's legal guardian to keep him from being isolated.
| 2 | A flaming sword, which turned every way "Shōnen and Knife" (ナイフと少年, "Naifu to Shōnen") | March 5, 1996; 978-4-04-713132-3 | April 7, 2004; 978-1-59116-390-9 |
Stage 07: "Closing Hearts" (閉じゆく心, "Toji Yuku Kokoro"); Stage 08: "Shinji's Bad Mood" (シンジご機嫌ななめ, "Shinji Gokigen Naname"); Stage 09: "The Trials of a True Fan" (マニアの受難, "Mania no Junan"); Stage 10: "A Teen Boy and a Knife" (ナイフと少年, "Naifu to Shōnen"); Stage 11: "Third Child Wandering" (さまよえるサード・チルドレン, "Samayoeru Sādo Chirudoren"); Stage 12: "Fumbling Towards Kindness" (やさしさの輪郭, "Yasashisa no Katachi")
Shinji is enrolled at school, but is attacked by his classmate, Toji Suzuhara, whose sister was injured during Shinji's first fight in the Evangelion. Shinji is then summoned by Nerv to fight the next Angel, Shamshel. Toji and another classmate, Kensuke Aida, follow him; they are subsequently caught up in the battle, and are forced to join the cockpit with Shinji. Shinji allows Unit-01 to go berserk against Shamshel during the last seconds, defeating the Angel. However, Shinji remains in shock. Misato questions Shinji's motivation to be an Eva pilot, and sends him back to live with his uncle. However, Misato realizes that Shinji is miserable with his uncle and sets out to find him. Shinji decides to remain in Tokyo-3.
| 3 | She gave me fruit of the tree, and I ate "White Scars" (白い傷跡, "Shiroi Kizuato") | October 29, 1996; 978-4-04-713165-1 | April 28, 2004; 978-1-59116-401-2 |
Stage 13: "White Scars" (白い傷跡, "Shiroi Kizuato"); Stage 14: "The Warped Room" (歪んだ部屋, "Yuganda Heya"); Stage 15: "What Her Crimson Eyes Believe In" (紅い瞳の信じるものは, "Akai Hitomi no Shinjirumono wa"); Stage 16: "Abandoned Memories" (棄てられた記憶, "Suterareta Kioku"); Stage 17: "The Night Before Battle" (決戦前夜, "Kessen Zen'ya"); Stage 18: "Blood Battle" (血戦!, "Kessen!"); Stage 19: "The Moon Inside the Darkness" (闇の中の月, "Yami no Naka no Tsuki")
While returning to Misato's house, Shinji becomes friends with Toji and Kensuke. At Nerv, he discovers that Gendo has a good relationship with Rei despite his cold personality. Shinji then tries to befriend Rei, but she rarely responds to him. A short time later, the Angel Ramiel appears in Tokyo-3 and nearly kills Shinji when he is dispatched to fight it in Unit-01, proceeding to drill into the GeoFront. Misato devises a plan in which Unit-01 will use an advanced prototype positron rifle, which will use the entire electrical output of Japan in order to operate; Rei uses Evangelion Unit-00 to shield Unit-01 during the attack. The plan is successful and Ramiel is defeated, and Rei smiles for the first time to Shinji when he retrieves her from Unit-00's cockpit.
| 4 | The woman whom thou gavest to be with me "Asuka Comes to Japan" (アスカ、来日, "Asuka, Rainichi") | October 17, 1997; 4-04-713197-0 | June 9, 2004; 978-1-59116-402-9 |
Stage 20: "Asuka Comes to Japan" (アスカ、来日, "Asuka, Rainichi"); Stage 21: "The Uninvited" (招かれざる者, "Manekarezarumono"); Stage 22: "Asuka Attacks" (アスカ攻撃, "Asuka Atakku"); Stage 23: "Try, Try Again" (トライ・アゲイン, "Torai Agein"); Stage 24: "Dissonance" (不協和音, "Disonansu"); Stage 25: "Shall We Dance?" (Shall we dance?); Stage 26: "One Moment, One Heart" (瞬間、心、重ねて, "Shunkan, Kokoro, Kasanete")
Asuka Langley Soryu, a young Eva pilot from Germany, comes to Tokyo-3 to join Nerv. The Angel Israfel attacks Tokyo-3, and Shinji and Asuka are sent to stop it. As Israfel splits into two twins, it easily defeats Shinji and Asuka, neither of them being able to cooperate with each other. Nerv manages to damage Israfel, but it survives and is set to recover in a few days. Determining that it will be impossible to fight the Angel, Misato puts Asuka and Shinji through a training regimen which has them spending as much time together as possible in order to synchronize their biorhythms. By the end of the six days, Asuka and Shinji pull off the routine flawlessly, destroying Israfel.
| 5 | If this be the work of men, it will come to naught "Cenotaph" (墓標, "Bohyō") | December 17, 1999; 978-4-04-713311-2 | August 10, 2004; 978-1-59116-403-6 |
Stage 27: "The Party" (パーティー, "Pātī"); Stage 28: "Follow Back Along Your Scar" (傷跡をたどれば, "Kizuato o Tadoreba"); Stage 29: "Cenotaph" (墓標, "Bohyō"); Stage 30: "Catch the G-Shock!" (受け止めろ 重力攻撃!); Stage 31: "Nerv Blackout" (ネルフ、停電, "Nerufu, Teiden"); Stage 32: "The Abyss of Truth" (真実の深淵, "Shinjitsu no Shin'en"); Stage 33: "Aquarium" (アクアリウム, "Akuariumu")
Asuka starts living in Misato's apartment and adapts to live in Japan, while she becomes friendly with Rei and Shinji. Shinji goes with Gendo to visit the grave of his mother, Yui Ikari, and tries to know his father better. Ryoji Kaji, Misato's ex-boyfriend, is revealed to be a spy sent to investigate Nerv. He reveals to Misato and Shinji that the First Angel, Adam — the being responsible for causing the Second Impact — remains crucified beneath Nerv's headquarters. Kaji then explains to Shinji that the Evas are clones of Adam, and that Yui Ikari was the one who created them. However, Yui was killed during an experiment with Unit-01, but her soul still remains in the Eva.
| 6 | Let me go, for the day breaketh "The Fourth Child" (四人目の適格者, "Yoninme no Tekikakusha") | December 15, 2000; 978-4-04-713380-8 | August 31, 2004; 978-1-59116-404-3 |
Stage 34: "The Fourth Child" (四人目の適格者, "Yoninme no Tekikakusha"); Stage 35: "Light, Then Shadow" (光、そして影, "Hikari, Soshite Kage"); Stage 36: "Confessions" (告白, "Kokuhaku"); Stage 37: "The Gift" (ギフト, "Gifuto"); Stage 38: "Ambush" (迎撃, "Geigeki"); Stage 39: "The Dummy System" (ダミーシステム, "Damī Shisutemu"); Stage 40: "Staining the Twilight Black" (黄昏を黒に染めて..., "Tasogare o Kuro ni Somete...")
With the arrival of Evangelion Unit-03, Nerv has Toji pilot the Eva in exchange for providing better medical care to his young sister. Despite agreeing to the deal, Toji reveals to Shinji that he fears becoming an Eva pilot. The activation test for Unit-03 goes awry when the Angel Bardiel infects it, causing it to wreak havoc through Tokyo-3. When Rei and Asuka are defeated by Bardiel, Shinji, fearing for Toji's safety, refuses to attack the Angel/Eva. Gendo then activates Unit-01's "dummy plug" system to take the Eva out of Shinji's control, allowing it to brutally destroy Unit-03 and kill Toji in the process.
| 7 | As one of us, to know good and evil "A Man's Battle" (男の戦い, "Otoko no Tatakai") | December 1, 2001; 978-4-04-713469-0 | October 12, 2004; 978-1-59116-405-0 |
Stage 41: "Fist" (フィスト, "Fisuto"); Stage 42: "Ashen Skies" (灰色の空, "Hai-iro no Sora"); Stage 43: "Cross-Examination" (尋問, "Jinmon"); Stage 44: "Atonement" (贖罪, "Shokuzai"); Stage 45: "A Man's Battle" (男の戦い, "Otoko no Tatakai"); Stage 46: "The Awakening: Part One" (覚醒・前編, "Kakusei, Zenpen"); Stage 47: "The Awakening: Part Two" (覚醒・後編, "Kakusei, Kōhen"); Stage 48: "Eradication" (消滅, "Shōmetsu")
After Toji's death, Shinji vows never to pilot an Eva again and decides to leave Nerv. However, just as Shinji leaves, the Angel Zeruel attacks Tokyo-3 and damages both Unit-00 and Unit-02; meanwhile, Unit-01 rejects all the pilots substituting for Shinji. Before leaving the city, Kaji convinces Shinji to return to Nerv to compensate for Toji's death. Shinji goes to fight Zeruel with Unit-01, but is overpowered. In the fight, Unit-01's armor is broken, giving the Eva a will of its own and a lack of control. Unit-01 then attacks and kills Zeruel, consuming it in an animalistic fashion. Nerv manages to capture a rampant Unit-01, but discovers that Shinji has been reduced to LCL inside the cockpit.
| 8 | Come now, let us make covenant, you and I "MOTHER" | December 19, 2002; 978-4-04-713529-1 | March 3, 2004; 978-1-59116-415-9 |
Stage 49: "... Kiss" (...Kiss.); Stage 50: "Into the Heart..." (心の中へ..., "Kokoro no Naka e..."); Stage 51: "Mother" (MOTHER); Stage 52: "Flashback" (回想, "Kaisō"); Stage 53: "A Giant Made of Light" (光の巨人, "Hikari no Kyojin"); Stage 54: "The Birth of Nerv" (ネルフ誕生, "Nerufu Tanjō"); Stage 55: "Message" (伝言, "Dengon"); Stage 56: "Of Jealousy" (ジェラシー, "Jerashī")
Unit-01 tries to make Shinji remain inside it, but Rei communicates with the Eva to urge it to let him go. Shinji suddenly has a dream in which his mother convinces him to live. As a result, Shinji's physical body appears outside Unit-01, having stayed inside for a month. Meanwhile, Nerv Subcommander Kozo Fuyutsuki is kidnapped by Seele, the secretive organization which controls Nerv. Seele's members ask Fuyutsuki what Gendo has been doing in Nerv, starting a series of flashbacks explaining how Fuyutsuki met Shinji's parents and how the Eva program was developed. After the flashback, Kaji rescues Fuyutsuki, but he is soon killed by an unknown person due to his work as a spy.
| 9 | Tell me, I pray thee, thy name "The Fifth Child" (フィフス・チルドレン, "Fifusu Chirudoren") | April 3, 2004; 978-4-04-713618-2 | November 24, 2004; 978-1-59116-707-5 |
Stage 57: "The Fifth Child" (フィフス・チルドレン, "Fifusu Chirudoren"); Stage 58: "Rejection" (拒絶, "Kyozetsu"); Stage 59: "Pride" (プライド, "Puraido"); Stage 60: "A Doll" (ドール, "Dōru"); Stage 61: "The Spear of Longinus" (ロンギヌスの槍, "Ronginusu no Yari"); Stage 62: "Distance" (distance); Stage 63: "Returning Fire" (応戦, "Ōsen")
Kaworu Nagisa arrives at Nerv as a new Eva pilot, but Shinji despises him when he sees Kaworu killing a stray kitten. Meanwhile, Asuka has problems synching with Unit-02 after suffering continuous defeats against the Angels; her fragile confidence is shaken when she must fight the Angel Arael alone. Arael invades Asuka's mind and forces her to relive the traumas of her past until she collapses, leaving Rei to throw the Lance of Longinus into space to destroy Arael. With Asuka left comatose, Kaworu is assigned to be the pilot of Unit-02. Soon afterward, the Angel Armisael attacks Tokyo-3. Shinji, Rei, and Kaworu's efforts to destroy Armisael are fruitless, and Unit-00 is infected by the Angel.
| 10 | If thou shalt afflict my daughters, or if thou shalt take other wives "Tears" (涙, "Namida") | February 25, 2006; 978-4-04-713800-1 | April 10, 2007; 978-1-4215-1160-3 |
Stage 64: "Tears" (涙, "Namida"); Stage 65: "I Want to Become One" (ひとつになりたい, "Hitotsu ni Naritai"); Stage 66: "Without Reaching Your Heart" (心届かず, "Kokoro Todokazu"); Stage 67: "Twisted Night" (ねじれた夜, "Nejireta Yoru"); Stage 68: "Mixing" (交錯, "Kōsaku"); Stage 69: "Tainted Blood" (汚れた血, "Yogoreta Chi"); Stage 70: "A Gathering of Nothingness" (虚無の群れ, "Kyomu no Mure")
To prevent Armisael from attacking, Rei self-destructs her Eva, destroying Tokyo-3. A few days later, a relatively uninjured Rei turns up, but has no memories of the previous events. Ritsuko Akagi, the head scientist at Nerv, reveals that Rei was born from the Eva that killed Yui. Furthermore, it is revealed that Ritsuko's mother, Naoko Akagi, killed the first Rei, believing her to be an abomination created by Gendo as a replacement for Yui; the second Rei died during the destruction of Unit-00. Ritsuko takes Shinji and Misato along on an unauthorized tour of the lab where more Rei clones are being housed; she subsequently destroys the clones.
| 11 | Which long for death, but it cometh not; and dig for it more than for hid treasures "A Fistful of Memories" (手のひらの記憶, "Te no Hira no Kioku") | June 19, 2007; 978-4-04-713934-3 | November 18, 2008; 978-1-4215-2029-2 |
Stage 71: "Adam's Offspring" (アダムの末裔, "Adamu no Matsuei"); Stage 72: "The Last Messenger" (最後のシ者, "Saigo no Shisha"); Stage 73: "Arrival at the Barrier" (辿りついた境界線, "Tadoritsuita Kyōkaisen"); Stage 74: "A Fistful of Memories" (手のひらの記憶, "Te no Hira no Kioku"); Stage 75: "The Missing Heart" (欠けた心, "Kaketa Kokoro"); Stage 76: "The Final Enemy" (最後の敵, "Saigo no Teki")
Kaworu tries to befriend Shinji, who constantly gives him the cold shoulder. Kaworu goes to converse with Seele, which orders him to attack Nerv; Kaworu is subsequently revealed to be the final Angel, Tabris, under the control of Seele. Kaworu commandeers Unit-02 and goes to find Adam, but discovers the Angel being kept by Nerv is in fact the Second Angel, Lilith. Thinking that Kaworu will trigger Third Impact by touching Adam, Misato sends Shinji into Unit-01 to destroy him. Kaworu asks Shinji to kill him so that he may be freed from Seele's control. Shinji does so, but he remains saddened. Kaworu's death marks the end of the Angels, but Seele launches an invasion of Nerv to kill Gendo.
| 12 | Ye fathers, provoke not your children to wrath "Father and Son" (父と子, "Chichi to Ko") | April 3, 2010; 978-4-04-715420-9 | March 15, 2011; 978-1-4215-3859-4 |
Stage 77: "Genocide" (GENOCIDE); Stage 78: "Father and Son" (父と子, "Chichi to Ko"); Stage 79: "Promised Time" (約束の時, "Yakusoku no Toki"); Stage 80: "Chance Meeting" (邂逅, "Kaikō") (Note: When released in tankōbon format, stages 80 and 81 were combined into a single chapter. All successive chapters were renumbered accordingly.); Stage 81: "Enemy from the Sky" (空よりの敵, "Sora Yori no Teki"); Stage 82: "The Last Instruction" (The last instruction); Stage 83: "Concord (Heart and Heart, Echoing Together)" (呼応, "Koō")
Seele sends soldiers from the Japanese Strategic Self Defense Force to kill all personnel at Nerv. A mentally weakened Asuka is placed inside Unit-02 to fight against JSSDF's air forces. Having obtained supernatural powers from Adam, Gendo saves Shinji from the JSSDF, allowing him to be taken by Misato to Unit-01 and assist Asuka. During the fight, Asuka recovers when realizing that her mother's soul is within Unit-02, and stops the JSSDF air and naval forces. However, Seele sends Mass Production Evangelions that overwhelm her. Misato manages to send Shinji to Unit-01, but is mortally wounded by fire from the JSSDF ground forces. Having been requested by Misato to protect Asuka, Shinji prepares to use Unit-01 once again.
| 13 | And there appeared a great wonder in heaven; a woman clothed with the sun "Calling" | November 2, 2012; 978-4-04-120354-5 | November 2, 2012; 978-1-4215-5291-0 |
Stage 84. "Calling"; Stage 85. "Betrayal" (裏切り, "Uragiri"); Stage 86. "The Ceremony Begins" (儀式の始まり, "Gishiki no Hajimari"); Stage 87. "Rejection" (拒絶, "Kyozetsu"); Stage 88. "Black Moon" (黒き月, "Kuroki Tsuki"); Stage 89. "Face-to-Face" (face to face) (Note: When released in tankōbon format, stages 89 and 90 were combined into a single chapter. All successive chapters were renumbered accordingly.); Stage 90. "Memories of Summer" (夏の追憶, "Natsu no Tsuioku")
Shinji pilots Unit-01 and saves Asuka from the MP Evas. Meanwhile, Ritsuko tries to self-destruct Nerv Headquarters to stop Gendo's plan to enact the Human Instrumentality Project. However, her plan is a failure and she is killed by Gendo. While Shinji is dealing with the MP Evas, he once again awakens Unit-01's full potential. The Lance of Longinus returns from space and crucifies the Unit-01. Gendo proceeds to initiate the Third Impact by merging the third Rei with Lilith. However, Rei rejects Gendo and combines with Lilith, becoming a growing being that holds Unit-01 and confronts Shinji's mind.
| 14 | And he that sat upon the throne said, Behold, I make all things new "Setting Off" (旅立ち, "Tabidachi") | November 20, 2014; 978-4-04-101932-0 | November 25, 2014 (digital); February 10, 2015 (physical); 978-1-4215-7835-4 |
Stage 91. "To where the Light Returns" (光還る処へ, "Hikari Kaeru Sho e"); Stage 92. "Birthday" (バースデイ, "Bāsudei"); Stage 93. "Sea of Life" (生命の海, "Seimei no Umi"); Stage 94. "Palms" (掌, "Tenohira"); Stage 95. "Thank you ∞ Goodbye" (ありがとう∞さようなら, "Arigatō ∞ sayōnara"); Final Stage. "Setting Off" (旅立ち, "Tabidachi"); Extra Stage. "The Summer Colors of Eden" (夏色のエデン, "Natsuiro no Eden")
The Third Impact has come. As the unbelievably massive form of Ayanami towers over the Earth, the Instrumentality Project enters its last stages. While the world shudders in terror as it is engulfed in a sea of LCL, Shinji's consciousness merges with Lilith's, and he searches his memories for a final understanding of himself and the fate of humanity.

=== Neon Genesis Evangelion: Angelic Days ===
| No. | Original release date | Original ISBN | English release date | English ISBN |
|---|---|---|---|---|
| 1 | February 17, 2004 | 978-4-04-924963-7 | April 30, 2006 | 978-1-4139-0344-7 |
Chapter 1, Part 1: "The Transfer Student" (転校生, "Tenkōsei"); Part 2: "Nerv"; Part 3: "Sad Hearts, Gentle Hearts" (悲しき心 優しき心, "Kanashiki Kokoro Yasashiki Kokoro"); Part 4: "Changing Hearts, Immutable Hearts" (変わりゆく心 変わらぬ心, "Kawari Yuku Kokoro Kawaranu Kokoro"); Bonus Chapter: "The Melody of Love's Stirrings" (ちっこい恋のメロディ, "Chikkoi Koi no Merodi")
A new transfer student, Rei, starts at the school. Rei takes a liking to Shinji and confides her feelings to Asuka.
| 2 | June 17, 2004 | 978-4-04-924974-3 | August 30, 2006 | 978-1-4139-0348-5 |
Chapter 2, Part 1: "Giant of Light" (光の巨人, "Hikari no Kyojin"); Part 2: "Rei Ayanami" (綾波レイ, "Ayanami Rei"); Part 3: "Into the Caves" (洞窟探検, "Dōkutsu Tanken"); Part 4: "The First Battle" (初めての戦い, "Hajimete no Tatakai")
The students learn they are being groomed to pilot Evangelions (Kensuke Aida is included with the canonical pilots: Shinji, Asuka, Rei, Kaworu, and Toji). Shinji and Rei are deployed to stop an Angel attack where, although he is initially paralysed with fear, Shinji manages to gather his nerves to save Rei and destroy the Angel.
| 3 | October 16, 2004 | 978-4-04-924984-2 | November 30, 2006 | 978-1-4139-0350-8 |
Chapter 3, Part 1: "The Group Photo" (記念撮影, "Kinen Satsuei"); Part 2: "How to Spend a Day Off" (休日の過ごし方, "Kyūjitsu no Sugoshi Kata"); Part 3: "Individual Feelings" (それぞれの思い, "Sorezore no Omoi"); Part 4: "The Ideal World" (理想の世界, "Risō no Sekai")
Kaworu invites Shinji to play at a concert with him. However, Shinji decides to take care of a sick Asuka. Kensuke is able to confess his feelings to Asuka and Rei is able to tell Shinji that she likes him.
| 4 | February 17, 2005 | 978-4-04-924996-5 | March 31, 2007 | 978-1-4139-0355-3 |
Chapter 4, Part 1: "That Which is Precious" (かけがえのないもの, "Kakegae no Nai Mono"); Part 2: "Ghosts of the Past" (過去の残像, "Kako no Zanzō"); Part 3: "A World of Light, A Darkness of Sound" (光の世界 闇の音, "Hikari no Sekai Yami no Oto"); Part 4: "The Future from Now" (これから先の未来も, "Kore kara Saki no Mirai mo")
The series climaxes with an assault on Tokyo-3 by multiple Angels, in which Shinji is ultimately brought into a form of Instrumentality, where he finally admits his feelings for Asuka. Afterwards, the pilots are split up to various training facilities across the world, with the story concluding several years later with them reuniting and unearthing a time capsule they buried together.
| 5 | July 17, 2005 | 978-4-04-925004-6 | May 31, 2007 | 978-1-4139-0361-4 |
Chapters 1-4
Gendo's life as a troubled junior high student frequently involved in fights is chronicled. His relationship with a young Yui, his meetings with the enigmatic Kaworu, and how their lives change is detailed.
| 6 | December 17, 2005 | 978-4-04-925018-3 | August 31, 2007 | 978-1-4139-0362-1 |
Chapter 1: "Misato and Kaji" (ミサト×加持, "Misato × Kaji"); Chapter 2: "Rei and Ritsuko" (レイ×リツコ, "Rei × Ritsuko"); Chapter 3: "Hikari and Toji" (ヒカリ×トウジ, "Hikari × Tōji"); Chapter 4: "Shinji and Asuka" (シンジ×アスカ, "Shinji × Asuka"); Side Story 1: "Toward Tomorrow" (未来に, "Mirai ni"); Side Story 2: "Tomorrow is Tomorrow" (明日は明日, "Ashita wa Ashita")
Volume 6, interspersed through the events portrayed in volume 4, is separated into four different endings each focused on a pair of characters: the first story details Misato and Kaji deciding to continue their long distance relationship, the second story dealing with Ritsuko and Rei dealing with their unrequited loves (Gendo and Shinji respectively), the third story is Touji's disappointment at not being able to pilot an EVA and his reunion with Hikari, and the final chapter has Shinji and Asuka getting into a fight and then subsequently understanding what they mean to each other.

=== Neon Genesis Evangelion: Shinji Ikari Raising Project ===
| No. | Original release date | Original ISBN | English release date | English ISBN |
|---|---|---|---|---|
| 1 | March 25, 2006 | 978-4-04-713801-8 | July 8, 2009 | 978-1-59582-321-2 |
Stages 01-07; Bonus Pages
| 2 | July 26, 2006 | 978-4-04-713838-4 | September 23, 2009 | 978-1-59582-377-9 |
Stages 08-14
| 3 | June 19, 2007 | 978-4-04-713935-0 | December 23, 2009 | 978-1-59582-447-9 |
Stages 15-21
| 4 | August 23, 2007 | 978-4-04-713960-2 | April 21, 2010 | 978-1-59582-454-7 |
Stages 22-27; Special Stage.
| 5 | March 26, 2008 | 978-4-04-715030-0 | July 21, 2010 | 978-1-59582-520-9 |
Stages 28-32; Extra Stage.1; Extra Stage.2
| 6 | October 25, 2008 | 978-4-04-715098-0 | September 8, 2010 | 978-1-59582-580-3 |
Stages 33-38
| 7 | March 26, 2009 | 978-4-04-715206-9 | December 22, 2010 | 978-1-59582-595-7 |
Stages 39-43; Extra Stage.1; Extra Stage.2
| 8 | June 26, 2009 | 978-4-04-715258-8 | March 9, 2011 | 978-1-59582-694-7 |
Stages 44-48; Extra Stage.
| 9 | December 26, 2009 | 978-4-04-715347-9 | August 10, 2011 | 978-1-59582-800-2 |
Stages 49-54; Extra Stage.1; Extra Stage.2
| 10 | May 26, 2010 | 978-4-04-715456-8 | January 11, 2012 | 978-1-59582-879-8 |
Stages 55-60; "Extra – Epilogue" (おまけ エピローグ, "Omake Epirōgu")
| 11 | February 26, 2011 | 978-4-04-715624-1 | June 6, 2012 | 978-1-59582-932-0 |
Stages 61-66; Extra Stage.
| 12 | September 26, 2011 | 978-4-04-715737-8 | December 5, 2012 | 978-1-61655-033-2 |
Stages 67-73; Extra Stage.
| 13 | May 26, 2012 | 978-4-04-120253-1 | December 18, 2013 | 978-1-61655-315-9 |
Stages 74-79; Extra Stage.
| 14 | November 26, 2012 | 978-4-04-120489-4 | June 18, 2014 | 978-1-61655-432-3 |
Stages 80-85; Extra Stage.
| 15 | August 26, 2013 | 978-4-04-120836-6 | December 17, 2014 | 978-1-61655-607-5 |
Stages 86-90; Extra Stage.1; Extra Stage.2; Extra Stage.3
| 16 | June 26, 2014 | 978-4-04-101746-3 | June 8, 2016 | 978-1-61655-997-7 |
Stages 91-95; Extra Stage.1; Extra Stage.2; Extra Stage.3; Extra Stage.4
| 17 | November 26, 2014 | 978-4-04-101747-0 | January 11, 2017 | 978-1-5067-0083-0 |
Stages 96-103; Extra Stage.
| 18 | May 26, 2016 | 978-4-04-101748-7 | August 29, 2018 | 978-1-5067-0806-5 |
Extra Stage.1; Extra Stage.2; Stages 104-110; Last Stage.

=== It's A Miraculous Win ===
It's A Miraculous Win (奇跡の勝ちは, Kiseki no kachi wa) is a manga series based on the CR Evangelion pachinko machines. It is set in a world where Evangelion is a fictional franchise, and the main character is an office lady, aged 24, called Sakura Mogam who loves to play Evangelion themed pachinko. She is a lively but clumsy young woman, obsessed with everything Evangelion-related, and owns multiple Evangelion merchandise. It is a light comedy manga that follows Sakura's misadventures and daily suffering as an obsessed Evangelion fan, as she frequently reminisces over scenes from the anime series, and even relives some of them in daily life. She also works with several people that happen to look exactly like some Evangelion cast members like Ritsuko and her boss looks like Fuyutsuki. Mogami herself cosplays Rei and Asuka, and has a design similar to Gunbuster's Noriko. Notably, Mogami dates a pachinko parlor employee who looks exactly like Kaworu.

| No. | Title | Japanese release date | Japanese ISBN |
|---|---|---|---|
| 1 | 最上さくらの出玉補完計画 奇跡の勝ちは | October 20, 2006 | 978-4-915450-88-4 |
| 2 | 出玉暴走編 | October 5, 2007 | 978-4-86298-011-3 |
| 3 | さくら覚醒編 | July 17, 2008 | 978-4-86298-023-6 |
| 4 | 新生編 | January 30, 2009 | 978-4-86298-039-7 |
| 5 | ユニゾン編 | October 16, 2009 | 978-4-86298-044-1 |
| 6 | 最後のシ者編 | December 18, 2009 | 978-4-86298-048-9 |
| 7 | 終結の園編 | May 21, 2010 | 978-4-86298-050-2 |
| 8 | 奇跡の勝ちは 〜福音編〜 | November 19, 2010 | 978-4-86298-053-3 |
| 9 | 殲滅編 | July 22, 2011 | 978-4-86298-065-6 |
| 10 | シンクロ編 | January 27, 2012 | 978-4-86298-072-4 |
| 11 | ビースト編 | December 14, 2012 | 978-4-86298-088-5 |
| 12 | 迎撃編 | March, 2013 | 978-4-86298-104-2 |
| 13 | 斬撃編 | December 19, 2014 | 978-4-86298-151-6 |
| 14 | 希望編 | September 18, 2015 | 978-4-86298-165-3 |

=== Neon Genesis Evangelion: Campus Apocalypse ===
| No. | Original release date | Original ISBN | English release date | English ISBN |
|---|---|---|---|---|
| 1 | March 26, 2008 | 978-4-04-854157-2 | September 1, 2010 | 978-1-59582-530-8 |
Stages I-IV
Shinji Ikari is a school boy at Nerv Catholic School along with Asuka and Rei. After seeing Rei meet with the mysterious Kaworu in an alley way one night, Shinji is exposed to the realities of angels, receives his EVA, and joins with Rei, Kaworu and Asuka in their mission to fight them.
| 2 | October 25, 2008 | 978-4-04-854210-4 | January 26, 2011 | 978-1-59582-661-9 |
Stages V-X
| 3 | March 26, 2009 | 978-4-04-854302-6 | March 30, 2011 | 978-1-59582-680-0 |
Stages XI-XVI
| 4 | December 26, 2009 | 978-4-04-854407-8 | June 22, 2011 | 978-1-59582-689-3 |
Stages XVII-XXI; Final Stage
Gendo Ikari reveals his true intent is to bring back whatever version of Yui he can. Rei refuses to become the spare and so Gendo shoots her, saying as he does that he can now use Shinji as an alternative. Kaworu tells the other characters of his angel status, but falls victim to Nerv's new anti-angel weapon. However he manages to recover sufficiently to (with Asuka's help) rescue Shinji from Gendo's plan. In the coma-induced scene witnessed by Shinji, Kaworu states that it was Shinji who made him "not want to destroy mankind." The story ends with Rei, Asuka and Shinji returning to school.
| | — | — | April 13, 2016 | 978-1-59582-680-0 |
Complete (OMNIBUS)

=== Neon Genesis Evangelion: Anima ===
| No. | Original release date | Original ISBN | English release date | English ISBN |
|---|---|---|---|---|
| 1 | November 30, 2017 | 978-4-04-893372-8 | August 22, 2019 (digital); October 29, 2019 (physical) | 978-1-64275-708-8 |
Prologue; Part 1: Prodigals; Part 2: Nativity; Part 3: A Planet Strangled; Part 4: Clearing the Stage
| 2 | November 30, 2017 | 978-4-04-893456-5 | February 20, 2020 (digital); March 10, 2020 (physical) | 978-1-64505-194-7 |
Part 1: The Tidal Wawe; Part 2: The Last Seele; Part 3: The Twisted Garden; Part 4: Defiance; Part 5: Asuka in The Moonlight; Part 6: Polar Vortex; Part 7: Black Thoughts; Part 8: Somwwhere in Time; Part 9: The Ark; Part 10: Within the Curtain; Part 11: Black and Purple; Part 12: Intelude; Part 13: Eva-02's Call
| 3 | March 15, 2018 | 978-4-04-893456-5 | June 30, 2020 (digital); August 25, 2020 (physical) | 978-1-64505-460-3 |
Part 1: Children; Part 2: A Journey Without Maps; Part 3: The Apple´s Core; Part 4: Symmetrical Components; Part 5: An Invitation North; Part 6: The Invitees; Part 7: Divergent Paths; Part 8: The Extent of the Self; Part 9: Kaleidoscope Sky; Part 10: In The Bright Night
| 4 | March 30, 2019 | 978-4-04-912120-9 | November 24, 2020 | 978-1-64505-770-3 |
Part 1: Stormy Weather; Part 2: Wander the Earth; Part 3: New World Border; Part 4: Mass Hysteria; Part 5: Lens; Part 6: Points of Convergence; Part 7: Collision Course; Part 8: New Land; Part 9: Many Roads to Home
| 5 | March 30, 2019 | 978-4-04-912406-4 | June 24, 2021 (digital); August 3, 2021 (physical) | 978-1-64827-202-8 |
Part 1: Beautiful and Dying World; Part 2: Final Model; Part 3: The Lance of Shinji; Part 4: Hikari / Armaros; Part 5: World Tree; Part 6: Aether Flux; Part 7: Battleship Return; Part 8: Pacific Partition; Part 9: Immaculate Conception

=== Petit Eva ===
==== Petit Eva: Evangelion@School ====
| No. | Japanese release date | Japanese ISBN |
|---|---|---|
| 1 | October 25, 2008 | 978-4-04-715100-0 |
| 2 | December 26, 2009 | 978-4-04-715353-0 |

==== Petit Eva Bokura Tanken Dōkōkai ====
| No. | Japanese release date | Japanese ISBN |
|---|---|---|
| 1 | June 26, 2009 | 978-4-04-715262-5 |

=== Neon Genesis Evangelion: The Shinji Ikari Detective Diary ===
| No. | Original release date | Original ISBN | English release date | English ISBN |
|---|---|---|---|---|
| 1 | June 23, 2010 | 978-4-04-854494-8 | September 4, 2013 | 978-1-61655-225-1 |
| 2 | January 22, 2011 | 978-4-04-854590-7 | April 2, 2014 | 978-1-61655-418-7 |

=== Neon Genesis Evangelion: Comic Tribute ===
| No. | Original release date | Original ISBN | English release date | English ISBN |
|---|---|---|---|---|
| | April 1, 2010 | 978-4-04-715419-3 | February 20, 2013 | 978-1-61655-114-8 |
1. Neon Genesis Revolutionary Legend Evangelion, Part 1 [by Yushi Kawata and Yukito]; 2. Drowning in L.C.L.; 3. Let's Study with Nerv! [by Terio Teri]; 4. Neon Genesis Tanakagelion [by Keiichi Tanaka]; 5. Misato Katsuragi's The Shinji Ikari Raising Project Report; 6. Tony Takezaki's Neon Genesis Evangelion [by Tony Takezaki]; 7. Neon Genesis Evandoglion [by Nawoki Karasawa]; 8. Mr.Director Anno; 9. Shinji and Asuka's Hot Day [by Ran Igarashi]; 10. Don't You Dance Like You Want to Win!; 11. In Sickness Unto Sudden Death Overtime; 12. Eva-san; 13. Decisive Battle! Evangelion Online!; 14. Angel Fight; 15., 16. Neon Genesis Revolutionary Legend Evangelion, Part 2+3 [by Yushi Kawata and Yukito]; 17. Eternal Fourteen; 18. I Forgave You Long Ago; 19. Tony Takezaki's Neon Genesis Evangelion [by Tony Takezaki]

=== Tony Takezaki's Neon Genesis Evangelion ===
A parodic spin-off written and illustrated by Tony Takezaki, and published by Dark Horse Comics. (Some parts of this book are included in Neon Genesis Evangelion: Comic Tribute.)

| No. | Original release date | Original ISBN | English release date | English ISBN |
|---|---|---|---|---|
| 1 | October 1, 2011 | 978-4-04-715789-7 | May 27, 2015 | 978-1-61655-736-2 |

=== Neon Genesis Evangelion: Legend of the Piko-Piko Middle School Students ===
| No. | Original release date | Original ISBN | English release date | English ISBN |
|---|---|---|---|---|
| 1 | November 22, 2014 | 978-4-04-102285-6 | May 10, 2017 | 978-1-5067-0151-6 |
| 2 | August 4, 2015 | 978-4-04-103334-0 | December 27, 2017 | 978-1-5067-0375-6 |
| 3 | May 24, 2016 | 978-4-04-103935-9 | — | — |
| 4 | April 25, 2017 | 978-4-04-105039-2 | — | — |
| 5 | October 4, 2018 | 978-4-04-107367-4 | — | — |

=== Evangelion 3.0 (-120 min.) ===
Included with the updated release of the final film of the Rebuild of Evangelion tetralogy, Evangelion: 3.0+1.01 Thrice Upon a Time, released in Japanese theaters on June 12, 2021. It is a prequel manga set before the events of the previous film, Evangelion: 3.0 You Can (Not) Redo, written by director Kazuya Tsurumaki and illustrated by character designer Hidenori Matsubara and director Mahiro Maeda, under Anno's supervision. It is 17 pages long, part of a 36-page booklet called Eva Extra-Extra including other illustrations. The manga was Anno's initiative, and began production on April 11, 2021. The home media release of the film, on March 8, 2023, included a re-release of the manga in video format in full color and voiced by the original cast.

| No. | Japanese release date | Japanese ISBN |
|---|---|---|
| 1 | June 12, 2021 | — |
In the Pacific Ocean, Asuka is waiting for Operation US, an attempt to recover Unit-01, to launch. Looking at the Moon, she recites a poem before being surprised by Mari, wearing her school uniform from Evangelion: 2.0. Mari explains she wants Shinji to be able to easily recognize them once he has recovered. They reflect on the operation, but Asuka insists Shinji himself is dead and unrecoverable, as WILLE believes he has been dissolved in the LCL. Mari insists and teases Asuka on what she'll do upon meeting him, but Asuka is dismayed at her "cursed" non-aging body. Misato's plan is for Mari to lead the operation with Asuka in support, as her Unit-08 is less damaged than Asuka's Unit-02, but Mari suggests Asuka take the lead instead for Shinji's sake. Looking back on memories of Shinji and Misato before Third Impact, Asuka changes her mind, and puts on her old plugsuit from the previous film and improvises a repair. As Mari sings, they prepare to launch into space.

== See also ==
- Near future in fiction
