= Kaoru Mfaume =

Tanzanian anime producer

- Born: Little Tokyo, Los Angeles, California, United States
- Citizenship: Japan; United States (former)
- Occupation: Anime producer

Kaoru Mfaume is an American-born entertainment producer who has worked extensively in the anime industry. He first worked with Island Pictures in 1995 and then joined Manga Entertainment as an Acquisitions and Production Manager in 1996. He continued to work in Acquisitions until 2005 when he became Managing Director. Some of his high-profile anime projects include Dead Leaves, Blood: The Last Vampire, Street Fighter Alpha: The Animation, Street Fighter Alpha: Generations, and Ghost in the Shell: Stand Alone Complex. After leaving Manga Entertainment in 2007, Mfaume founded Endeleizo Co., Ltd, an intellectual property management, production and consultation company. In 2011, he founded Arigato Blueprint, a project supporting communities and institutions that are in need of help in the disaster areas in Japan, following the 2011 Tōhoku earthquake and tsunami.
