= The End of Evangelion =

1997 anime film

- Theatrical release poster

Japanese name
- Kanji: 新世紀エヴァンゲリオン劇場版 Air/まごころを、君に
- Literal meaning: New Century Evangelion Theatrical Edition: Air/Sincerely Yours
Transcriptions
- Revised Hepburn: Shin Seiki Evangerion Gekijō-ban Eā/Magokoro wo, Kimi ni
- Directed by: Hideaki Anno (Chief) (Sincerely Yours); Kazuya Tsurumaki (Air)
- Written by: Hideaki Anno
- Produced by: Mitsuhisa Ishikawa
- Starring: Megumi Ogata; Megumi Hayashibara; Yūko Miyamura; Kotono Mitsuishi; Fumihiko Tachiki; Yuriko Yamaguchi; Motomu Kiyokawa; Akira Ishida
- Cinematography: Hisao Shirai
- Edited by: Sachiko Miki
- Music by: Shirō Sagisu
- Production companies: Gainax; Production I.G
- Distributed by: Toei Company
- Release date: July 19, 1997 (Japan)
- Running time: 87 minutes
- Country: Japan
- Language: Japanese
- Box office: ¥2.47 billion / $19 million

The End of Evangelion (Note: Japanese: 新世紀エヴァンゲリオン劇場版 Air/まごころを、君に, Hepburn: Shin Seiki Evangerion Gekijō-ban Eā/Magokoro wo, Kimi ni; lit. 'New Century Evangelion Theatrical Edition: Air/Sincerely Yours') is a 1997 Japanese animated apocalyptic science fiction film directed by Hideaki Anno and Kazuya Tsurumaki, written by Anno, and animated by Gainax and Production I.G. It serves as an ending to the anime television series Neon Genesis Evangelion, which aired from 1995 to 1996. The staff had little time to produce the final episodes of the original series, particularly due to Anno's indecision over how to conclude the series and the troubled production schedule. For The End of Evangelion, Gainax revisited ideas that it had previously discarded due to time constraints, particularly for the twenty-fifth episode.

Taking place after the twenty-fourth episode of the series, the film follows the paramilitary organization Nerv as they are attacked by the secret organization Seele, who seek to initiate a process named the Human Instrumentality Project, while Nerv operations director Misato Katsuragi searches for Shinji Ikari to pilot his mecha Evangelion. The series' voice actors reprised their roles, including Megumi Ogata as Shinji, Yūko Miyamura as Asuka, and Megumi Hayashibara as Rei.

The film has been described by Anno and in official materials as both a remake of the final two episodes and an alternative ending to the original series, like a multi-ending video game. Shortly before the release, Anno and Gainax released another film, Neon Genesis Evangelion: Death & Rebirth; the first segment, Death, summarizes the first twenty-four episodes of the series while the second segment, Rebirth, previews The End of Evangelion. In 1998, Gainax combined the overlapping films into Revival of Evangelion. The End of Evangelion was a box-office success, grossing ¥2.47 billion. The film was honored at the Awards of the Japanese Academy and the Animation Kobe, and won the 1997 Animage Anime Grand Prix. Critics praised its direction, editing, emotional power, and script, though some criticized its oblique religious symbolism and abstraction. Reviewers and publications have since ranked it among the greatest animated films of all time.

== Plot ==
=== Episode 25': "Air" / "Love is destructive." ===
Fourteen-year-old Shinji Ikari is the pilot of Evangelion Unit-01, one of several giant cyborgs designed to fight hostile supernatural entities called Angels. Shinji is distraught after having to kill his friend, Kaworu Nagisa, who revealed himself as an Angel in human form. (Note: As depicted in The Beginning and the End, or "Knockin' on Heaven's Door" (1996)) He visits his fellow pilot Asuka Langley Soryu in a hospital where she lies in a coma. Trying to shake her awake, he accidentally exposes her breasts and masturbates over her comatose body.

Nerv, the paramilitary organization that controls the Evangelions, is formally controlled by the secret committee Seele. Seele plans to initiate the Third Impact and the Human Instrumentality Project, an apocalyptic process to merge humanity into a single consciousness. Seele discovers that Shinji's father and commander of Nerv, Gendo Ikari, intends to create his version of Instrumentality to reunite with his deceased wife, Yui, whose soul resides in Unit-01. After a failed attempt to hack Nerv, Seele dispatches the Japan Strategic Self-Defense Forces to seize control of Nerv and execute its staff. Nerv Major Misato Katsuragi orders Asuka to be moved to Evangelion Unit-02 and placed at the bottom of a lake. Misato wants Shinji, who is wallowing in self-hatred, to defend Nerv and rescues him from the invading troops, who mortally shoot her in the process. Before her death, Misato implores Shinji to pilot Unit-01 and kisses him. Shinji discovers Unit-01 has been immobilized in special bakelite. Nerv's head scientist Ritsuko Akagi attempts to initiate Nerv's headquarters self-destruction as an act of petty revenge against Gendo, but the Magi supercomputer Casper rejects her command, at which point Gendo kills her.

Gendo meets the Evangelion pilot Rei Ayanami, who carries the soul of the Angel Lilith. Gendo possesses the body of the Angel Adam in his hand, intending to combine it with Lilith to begin his own version of the Third Impact. Meanwhile, Asuka overcomes her trauma upon learning that the soul of her deceased mother is inside Unit-02. She reactivates Unit-02 and destroys the military forces, including Seele's new mass-produced Evangelion units. However, the units reanimate after Unit-02's battery runs out and proceed to disembowel it. Unit-01 then breaks free and, with Shinji in the cockpit, ascends above Nerv Headquarters. Shinji sees Seele's units carrying the mutilated remains of Unit-02 and screams.

=== Episode 26': "Sincerely Yours" / One More Final: "I need you." ===
Rei betrays Gendo and takes Adam for herself. She merges with Lilith, who changes into a gigantic version of Rei. Extraterrestrial artifact the Spear of Longinus extracts itself from the Moon, giving Seele the means to initiate the Third Impact via their scenario. The mass-produced units pull Unit-01 into the sky and crucify it, beginning the ritual to trigger the Third Impact. Lilith makes contact with Shinji. After several dreamlike contemplations, including strangling Asuka after she rejects his pleas for help, Shinji concludes he is alone and everyone in the world, including himself, should die. Lilith responds by initiating the Third Impact and dissolving human bodies into the primordial fluid LCL, reforming their souls into a single consciousness.

In this new state, Shinji contemplates reality, individuality, and happiness. Despite his previous feelings, he eventually decides life is about experiencing pain as well as joy, leading him to reject the single consciousness with a hopeful vision involving Rei and Kaworu. His rejection causes the destruction of Lilith and the mass-produced units, setting the souls of humanity free. Yui's soul tells Shinji anyone can return to their physical body if they have the will, and they bid farewell, with Yui leaving Earth in Unit-01's body. Some time later, Shinji and Asuka lie on a beach near some tombstones, facing a sea stained red. Shinji catches a glimpse of an ethereal Rei and begins to strangle Asuka, but he stops when she caresses his face. Shinji breaks down in tears, while Asuka voices disgust.

== Voice cast ==
Character	Japanese	English	
Character	Japanese	Gaijin Productions/Manga (2002)	VSI/Netflix (2019)
Shinji Ikari	Megumi Ogata	Spike Spencer	Casey Mongillo
Misato Katsuragi	Kotono Mitsuishi	Allison Keith	Carrie Keranen
Rei Ayanami	Megumi Hayashibara	Amanda Winn-Lee	Ryan Bartley
Asuka Langley Soryu	Yūko Miyamura	Tiffany Grant	Stephanie McKeon
Kaworu Nagisa	Akira Ishida	Aaron Krohn	Clifford Chapin
Gendo Ikari	Fumihiko Tachiki	Tristan MacAvery	Ray Chase
Kozo Fuyutsuki	Motomu Kiyokawa	Michael Ross	JP Karliak
Ritsuko Akagi	Yuriko Yamaguchi	Sue Ulu	Erica Lindbeck
Makoto Hyuga	Hiro Yuki	Keith Burgess	Daniel MK Cohen
Shigeru Aoba	Takehito Koyasu	Jason C. Lee	Billy Kametz
Maya Ibuki	Miki Nagasawa	Amy Seeley	Christine Marie Cabanos
Keel Lorentz	Mugihito	Tom Booker	D. C. Douglas
Ryoji Kaji	Kōichi Yamadera	Aaron Krohn	Greg Chun
Yui Ikari	Megumi Hayashibara	Amanda Winn-Lee	Ryan Bartley
Kyoko Zeppelin Soryu	Maria Kawamura	Kimberly Yates	uncredited

== Production ==
=== Pre-production ===
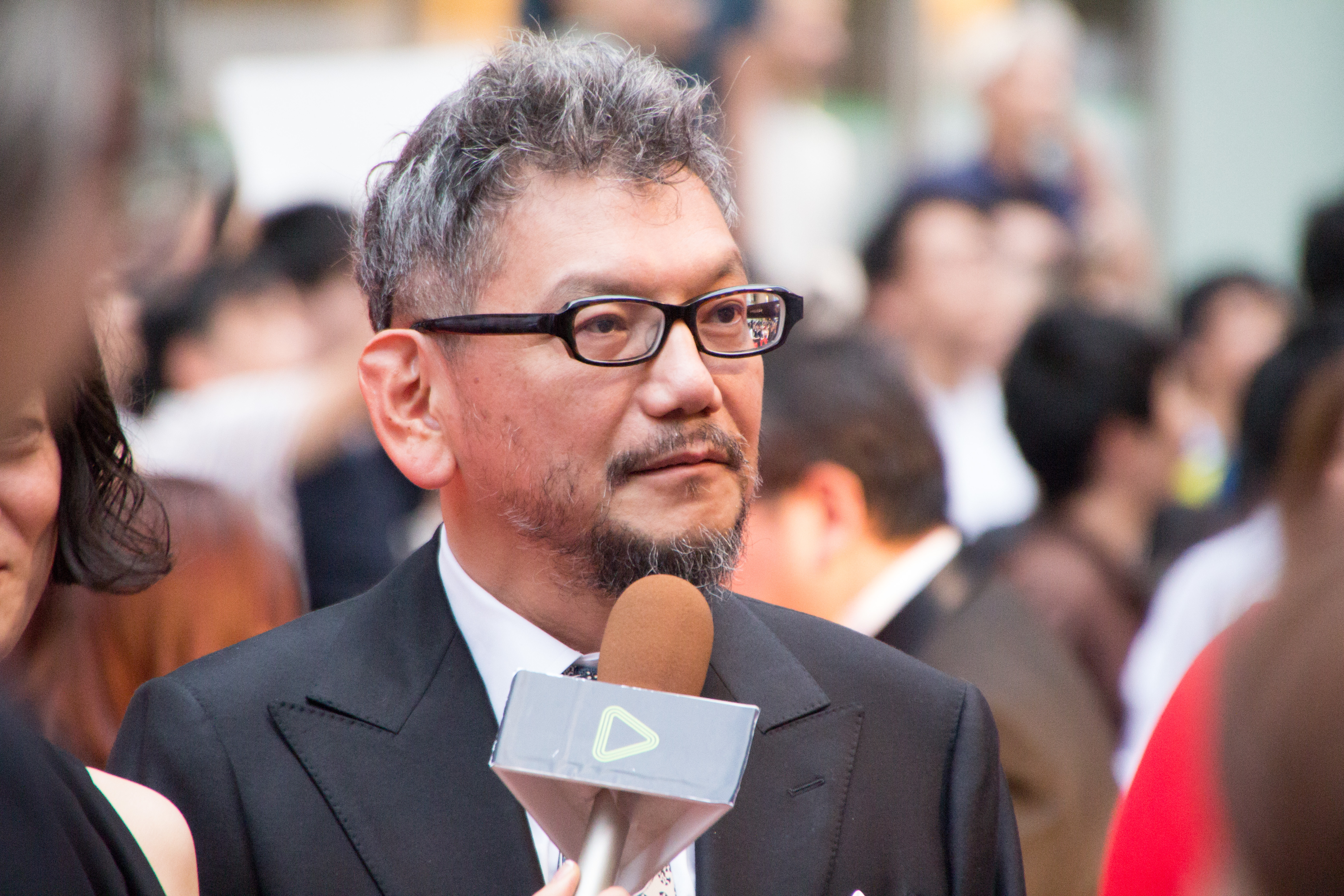
Neon Genesis Evangelion director Hideaki Anno

After the first broadcast of the animated series Neon Genesis Evangelion, its ending attracted considerable media attention in Japan. With the broadcast of the first episode, "Angel Attack", animation studio Gainax had only roughly completed twelve of the planned twenty-six episodes after nearly two years of production, forcing the studio to produce the remaining fourteen in about a third of that time. The increasingly demanding schedule caused the production system to collapse and animation quality to decline. Gainax tried to achieve the greatest possible effect with the least possible effort in the limited time remaining. Masayuki and Yoshiyuki Sadamoto, for example, produced the twenty-fourth episode in three weeks amid a state of panic, while the staff completed the final two episodes within a matter of days. According to official information and staff statements, the time constraints and the series' director Hideaki Anno's personal indecision led to the abandonment of the original script of the penultimate episode, "Do you love me?". In the case of the last episode, "Take care of yourself", Anno stated in an interview that he had roughly followed his original plan instead.

The two final episodes, which focus on psychological introspection and long inner monologues of the show's main characters, met the expectations of Gainax studio's staff but became a source of discussion for fans; although the finale concluded the most important psychological themes of the series, it abandoned the main plot, giving rise to controversy. The issue was debated throughout Japan, fueling the series' already-high popularity. Fans demanded a new ending, or, at least, a conclusion that answered the open questions. Anno also fell into a difficult psychological state. He perceived a lot of criticism towards his work, and felt he was accused of being sloppy and negligent. He read online discussions in which some people argued about the best way to kill him; Anno thus no longer wanted to work in animation and contemplated suicide. He still defended the work of the other staff members on the original ending, stating that the series had concluded satisfactorily.

On April 26, 1996, about a month after the final episode of the series aired, the magazine Monthly Shōnen Ace announced plans for a remake of the final two episodes. The magazine also announced the production of a new feature-length film. The first feature film, Neon Genesis Evangelion: Death & Rebirth (1997), was intended to conclude the story of the original series, while the second installment would have told a new story, with a completely different setting. Gainax initially planned to release the project as an original video animation (OVA) for the home-video market, but later decided during production to release it theatrically. The production also involved Imagica, a film post-production company, and fashion companies such as Fiorucci, Americanino, and Edwin for the clothing used in the live-action segment. At the suggestion of Neon Genesis Evangelion character designer Yoshiyuki Sadamoto, the staff planned to set the unreleased film in winter, in contrast to the eternal summer in which Japan remains trapped in the animated series. Anno also considered a winter setting and wanted to depict battles between Evangelions on snow-covered mountains, regardless of the technical difficulties involved. In a post-apocalyptic scenario where the destruction of Earth had rendered most of the planet uninhabitable, humans would live within an area protected by a barrier called an "AT field". Angels, the antagonistic creatures of the original series, would attack the area, concentrating their forces on the only bridge connecting it to the rest of the world and devouring humans in the process.

Gainax originally planned to release the separate feature film in mid-1997. Production of Rebirth, however, fell behind schedule; the staff produced so much material that Gainax had to split it into two releases. In addition, some staff members struggled with the demanding production schedule, prompting Gainax to postpone the new film indefinitely. In March 1997, Gainax released Death and Rebirth. The film consists of two segments, running sixty and twenty-five minutes respectively. The first segment, Shi (シ) or "Death", presents a montage of clips from the first twenty-four episodes of the series alongside previously unreleased sequences. The last segment, Shinsei (新生) ("Rebirth"), previews the new ending. It includes the first twenty minutes of the following installment and ends at the beginning of the confrontation between Eva-02 and the Eva Series. Gainax then announced a second concluding feature film. According to Carl Gustav Horn, editor of the English edition of the Evangelion manga, Anno reportedly stated that the second film would present the same ending of the show from a different perspective. The film has been described by official materials as both a remake and an alternative ending to the original series finale. The series' official booklets also noted that the two are different endings that share the same themes and basic framework, comparing them to identical twins, "different people with the same genes". Hideaki Anno himself compared the two endings to a multi-ending video game.

=== Direction and development ===
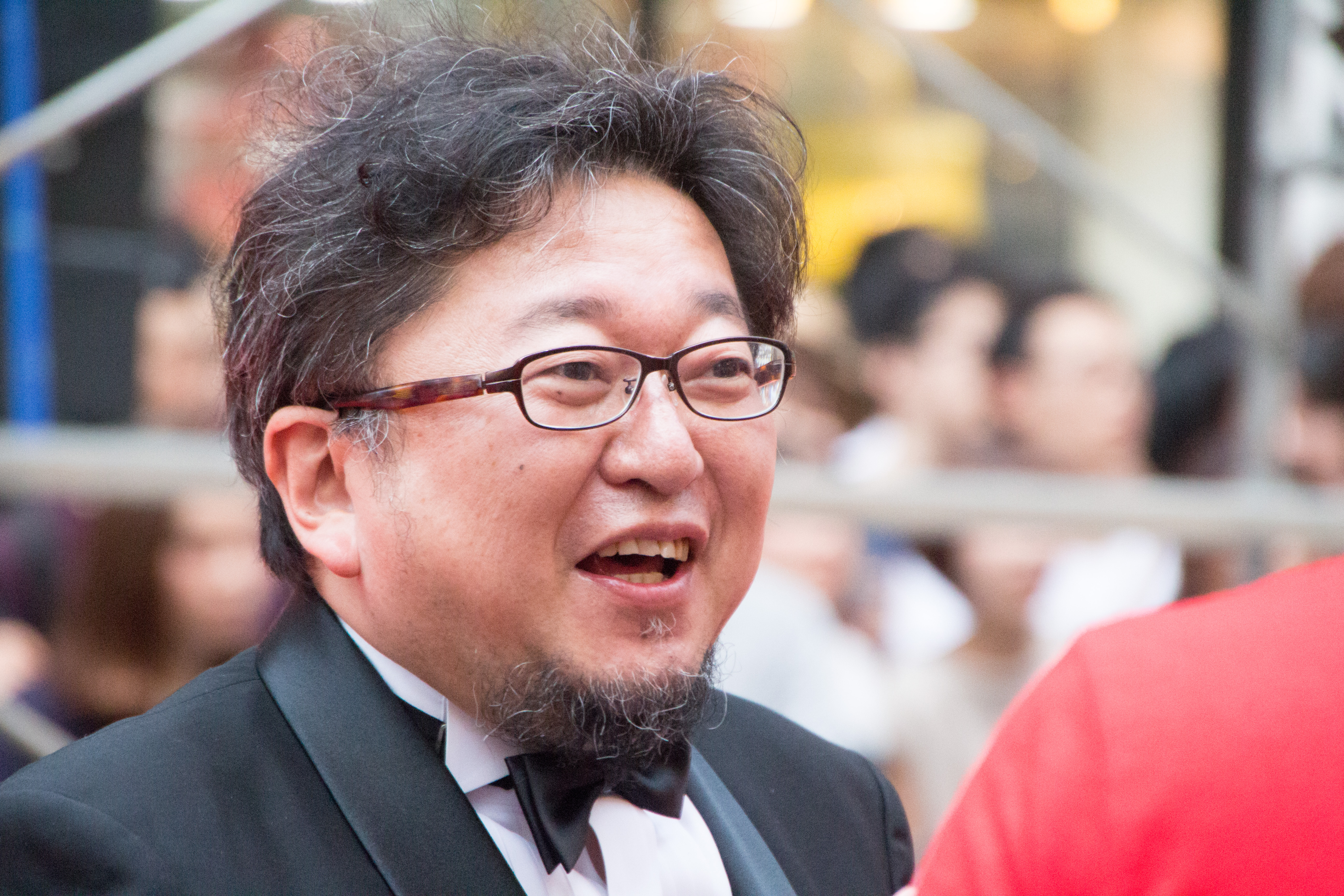
Shinji Higuchi collaborated with Anno on the storyboards of "Sincerely Yours".

After the series concluded, Anno entered a difficult psychological state, and his friend and anime director Hayao Miyazaki advised him to take a break. Anno followed his advice and rested for several months. Gainax officially began production of the film version of Neon Genesis Evangelion on November 8, 1996. According to Neon Genesis Evangelion producer Toshimichi Ōtsuki, the staff had started working on The End of Evangelion before the series finished airing and continued until the last minute to complete the second feature film on time. Unlike Death and Rebirth, which received an extensive media campaign, The End of Evangelion received no special advertising campaign, and promotional activities remained minimal. The creators intended the film as a funeral with which to "bury" Neon Genesis Evangelion. Anno titled the film The End of Evangelion to represent the metaphorical death of the Evangelion project; he sought to bring the project to an end with his own hands rather than watch its popularity slowly fade away.

Gainax initially proposed the title Evangelion: Rebirth 2, but changed it to The End of Evangelion during production. The filmmakers divided the feature into two segments, "Episode 25'" and "Episode 26'". Like the television episodes, each segment carries two titles, one in Japanese and one in English. The staff initially titled the first segment "The Door to Summer" (夏への扉, Natsu e no tobira), a reference to Robert A. Heinlein's 1957 science fiction novel of the same name. The staff later opted for "Love is Destructive" and "Air", the latter carrying the double meaning of "atmosphere" and music. The staff titled the second episode Magokoro wo, kimi ni ("Sincerely Yours"). Following a Gainax tradition of naming the final episode of a series after an existing story or feature film, "Sincerely Yours" pays tribute to the 1968 film Charly, based on the novel Flowers for Algernon by Daniel Keyes, which was distributed in Japan with the same title. The home-video editions of the series also included previews of "Air" and "Sincerely Yours" at the end of the corresponding original final episodes. Kazuya Tsurumaki, who had served as assistant director on the television series, directed "Air". Other Gainax staff members, including Masayuki and Shinji Higuchi, contributed to the production and collaborated on the storyboards under Tsurumaki's direction. Anno directed "Sincerely Yours", while Higuchi and Jun'ichi Satō assisted him with the storyboards.

=== Writing ===
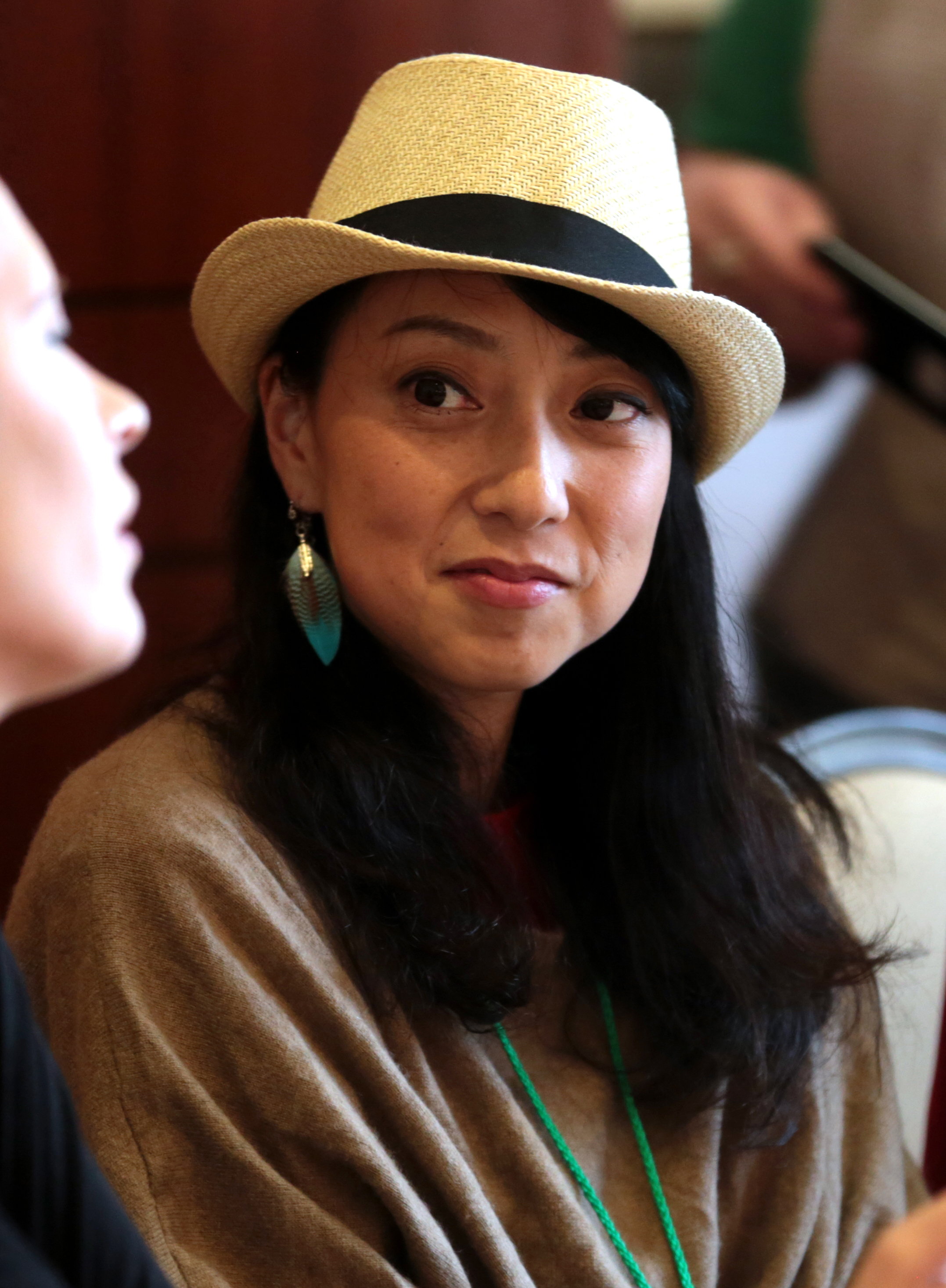
Yūko Miyamura, Asuka Langley Soryu's voice actress. Her performance influenced the writing of the final line.

Due to time constraints, the staff did not use the original script for the twenty-fifth episode of the series. When Gainax decided to resume Neon Genesis Evangelion, Anno based the script for "Air" on this unused material. The staff structured the episode to remain as close as possible to the ending they had originally intended. For the second episode, "Sincerely Yours", Anno added several narrative elements to the original script, further developing themes already introduced in the final episode of the series. Unlike the television conclusion, which focuses on the protagonists' psychology, the film addresses the Human Instrumentality Project from an external perspective, while the series presents it through the main characters' introspection. Official materials stated that the story of Evangelion branches into two endings after the twenty-fourth episode and "the two stories each unfold differently and arrive at their own climaxes". The staff's exhaustion influenced the tone of the script. Shinji's characterization had also changed since the twenty-fifth episode of the series, creating inconsistencies. The absence of the tension that had characterized the production of the original series also created difficulties for the staff; Kazuya Tsurumaki worked on the film while considering it unnecessary until the end.

During production of the series and Death and Rebirth, Anno asked anyone who worked on Neon Genesis Evangelion to suggest possible ways to conclude the story; he relied particularly on Higuchi, Sadamoto, and Ikuto Yamashita, the series' mecha designer. One of Yamashita's proposals for the unrealized feature film involved Eva-01 attacking the headquarters of Nerv's German branch, which possessed a weapon called the "Long Range Universal Invasion Cannon", or "Dead God Spine". In Yamashita's scenario, Evangelions would wage war in a world affected by mysterious rays of light capable of transforming people into werewolf-like creatures. Wolfmen would surround Nerv's base, a sterilized stronghold; in a flashback, Shinji would transform into his Eva after exchanging bodies with it. The Evangelion pilots would also play a role in politics, while Nerv would regard Asuka with suspicion and Germany would consider her a traitor. In one scene from Yamashita's script, Shinji would run alongside the werewolves, who acclaimed him as their king, while Rei would kill a werewolf in cold blood and declare that she hated animals.

Gainax originally planned a giant battle as the show's ending with a final confrontation with the series' last twelve enemies, then called the Apostolos, reflecting the twelve Apostles mentioned in the Book of Revelation. Gainax chose the Moon as the setting for the battle because of its symbolic association with Rei and the series' ending theme, "Fly Me to the Moon". The staff also planned to show a message written across the Moon's surface in the final scenes, in a sequence reminiscent of the ending of the OVA series Gunbuster. Gainax ultimately abandoned most of these ideas during production. The final version instead of the confrontation with the twelve Apostolos presents the battle between Eva-02 and the Mass Production Models. Additional changes occurred at the script stage; in one of the opening sequences, for example, Shinji would say goodbye to his two former classmates and friends, Kensuke Aida and Toji Suzuhara, at their middle school in Tokyo-3, shortly before their sudden departure for Germany. Echoing the final scene of Neon Genesis Evangelion's seventeenth episode, Toji would shoot a basketball while using a wheelchair. In "Sincerely Yours", Lilith and the nine Eva Series would form a triangle-shaped pattern, which the final version replaced with a horizontal Tree of Life. Furthermore, Anno based the final sequence, in which Shinji strangles Asuka until she caresses his cheek, on an incident involving a female acquaintance of his. A man once strangled the woman, but as he was about to kill her, she caressed him. When he loosened his grip on her neck, she regained her cold demeanor and uttered the words that Asuka would have said to Shinji in the original script, "I can't stand the idea of being killed by someone like you" (あんたなんかに殺されるのは真っ平よ).

=== Voice cast ===
For The End of Evangelion, all the voice actors from the original animated series reprised their roles, except those whose characters the staff removed from the script during the writing process, such as Toji Suzuhara and Kensuke Aida. After the final recording session, Anno asked the cast to record the film again from scratch, providing detailed instructions as they re-recorded almost every line. Anno instructed the actors to perform as though they were acting in a live-action film, avoiding conventional anime voice-acting techniques. When he wanted to focus on the dialogue and emphasize the voice actors' performances, he framed the characters from behind, kept them off-screen, or used long shots, preventing facial expressions and lip movements from overly constraining the performances. The cast also re-recorded the scenes from "Air" that had already appeared in "Rebirth".

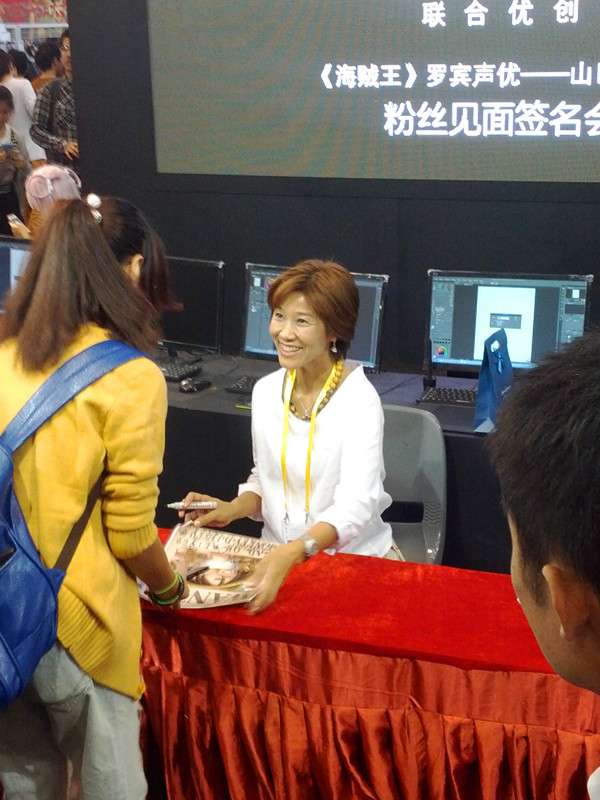
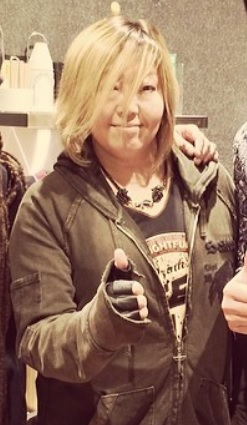
Yuriko Yamaguchi and Megumi Ogata, who respectively voiced Ritsuko Akagi and Shinji Ikari
- Megumi Ogata as Shinji Ikari, the 14-year-old protagonist of Neon Genesis Evangelion. As with the television series, Ogata felt comfortable with her role but found the screaming required during the recording sessions difficult. While recording the film's final scene, in which Shinji strangles Asuka, Ogata physically strangled Asuka's voice actress, Yūko Miyamura. Miyamura struggled to produce realistic strangulation sounds and personally asked her colleague for help. In her agitation, Ogata gripped Miyamura's neck too tightly, risking damage to her voice and nearly leaving her unable to deliver her remaining lines. Although the scene lasts only a few minutes, the actresses spent about ninety minutes recording it.
- Yūko Miyamura as Asuka Langley Soryu. In the original script, Asuka, immediately after Shinji strangles her, would deliver the final line, "I can't stand the idea of being killed by someone like you", in the coldest possible tone. Dissatisfied with both the line and Miyamura's performance, Anno asked her to imagine a stranger capable of raping her at any time who instead masturbated while watching her sleep after sneaking into her room. He then asked what she would say if she woke up and realized what had happened. Disgusted by the scenario, Miyamura simply replied, "How disgusting" (気持ち悪い, kimochi warui). Anno subsequently adopted the phrase as Asuka's final line.
- Megumi Hayashibara as Rei Ayanami and Yui Ikari.
- Kotono Mitsuishi as Major Misato Katsuragi. Mitsuishi had difficulties during recordings because Misato experiences difficulty talking about her true feelings.
- Fumihiko Tachiki as Gendo Ikari. Tachiki found it difficult to empathize with or understand the character. During the sessions, he received support from the staff, being directed step by step by Anno and the sound director. The sessions for Gendo's recording lasted about two days.
- Yuriko Yamaguchi as Ritsuko Akagi. In the film, Ritsuko attempts to destroy Nerv headquarters, but her former lover Gendo Ikari shoots her dead. Just before firing, Ikari says, "Ritsuko Akagi, actually ... ". The film omits the final part of the line, leaving viewers to interpret what he says. Ritsuko replies, "You're a liar"; delivering the line required particular interpretative and acting skills from Yamaguchi. During the recording session, Anno noticed her emotional state and gave her a private clue. Yamaguchi stated, "with that one incredible hint, I, and Ritsuko Akagi, were utterly defeated". The phrase in the original storyboards was supposed to be covered by the sound of an explosion.
- Akira Ishida as Kaworu Nagisa. Ishida said he found the role "very difficult", and felt "a lot of pressure" during the recording of the film version. His emotional tension grew exponentially when he learned that there would be two feature films, but he was satisfied with his performance.

=== Animation ===
Unlike the television series, which used 16mm film, the production team shot the film in 35mm film. The staff appointed Kazuchika Kise, a member of Production I.G and art co-director of the television series, and Takeshi Honda, who had animated the opening theme song of Neon Genesis Evangelion, as animation and mecha design directors. Shunji Suzuki, Teishi Hiramatsu, and Anno served as art directors for the twenty-sixth episode. Suzuki and Hiramatsu directed the scenes, while Anno coordinated the battles between the mecha. Tsurumaki also contributed to the animation, and the staff brought him in at the last minute to assist with the coloring process. Masayuki, assistant director of Neon Genesis Evangelion and director of "Death", co-produced the animation and worked on the storyboards and promotional posters. The staff also assigned him to supervise sequences involving water or waves, which animators generally considered among the most difficult elements to animate. Makoto Kamiya served as special effects director. Hisaki Furukawa and Yō Yoshinari served as assistant animators, Harumi Takaboshi as colorist, Hiroshi Katō as art director, and Hisao Shirai as director of photography. Takashi Hashimoto also joined the production as a key animator on the second half of "Sincerely Yours". Masayuki recruited Hashimoto with the promise of particularly spectacular action sequences; according to Hashimoto, however, the staff mainly assigned him mechanical and effects sequences from the final part of the film, including Unit-01's impalement and crucifixion, the Lance of Longinus stopping in front of Unit-01's throat, and several shots near the end of Instrumentality.

The Human Instrumentality scene, in which Lilith collects the souls of all humanity. Production I.G created the scene using computer graphics.

According to writers Víctor Sellés de Lucas and Manuel Hernández-Pérez, "Anno did not abandon most of the stylistic resources employed in the series, but he was more ambitious in the visualization of battles [in The End of Evangelion]". Gainax involved Production I.G, which had previously collaborated on several episodes of the original series. The staff also sought to improve the quality of the "Air" footage already included in "Death". The filmmakers used computer graphics (CG) to add depth to the images and surpass the animation quality of the original television series. Omnibus Japan, which had previously worked on Patlabor 2: The Movie (1993) and Ghost in the Shell (1995), made the most significant contribution. Most of the computer-generated sequences appear at the beginning of the Human Instrumentality and Third Impact scenes, in which cruciform lights cover the globe. The companies divided the work according to the technical requirements and stylistic choices of each scene. Production I.G handled scenes involving 3D computer graphics that traditional techniques could hardly achieve, such as the introductory shots of the nine Eva Series units, while Gainax developed scenes requiring 2D computer graphics, such as those depicting computer screens. The sequences depicting the clash between Unit-02 and the Strategic Self-Defense Forces evoke the battle between the Angel Sachiel and the United Nations forces in the first episode. Furthermore, the staff incorporated images from the original twenty-fifth episode in the film, including Eva-02 and Asuka at the bottom of a lake and the corpses of Ritsuko and Misato. They also inserted brief watercolor sequences during Instrumentality.

=== Sound ===
Director Anno commissioned Toru Noguchi, with whom he had previously worked on the television series Nadia: The Secret of Blue Water, to create the sound effects. Anno asked Noguchi to pursue maximum realism and convey sensations that cel animation could not express. Noguchi paid particular attention to the sounds of lasers and AT Fields and to the background noise of cicadas, which he specially modulated to harmonize with the soundtrack. For the movements of the Evangelion units, Anno asked him to recreate the sound that bundles of wires would make when contracting like muscles, treating the units as living beings. He therefore avoided sounds commonly used in other mecha anime. Anno gave meticulous instructions, specifically requesting the sound of a World War II machine gun and the sounds of particular historical ships. For the Prog-Knife, the sound team reworked the metallic noise of a real cutter. Makoto Sumiya, a recording engineer from Tokyo TV Center, assisted Noguchi in the process.

=== Filming ===
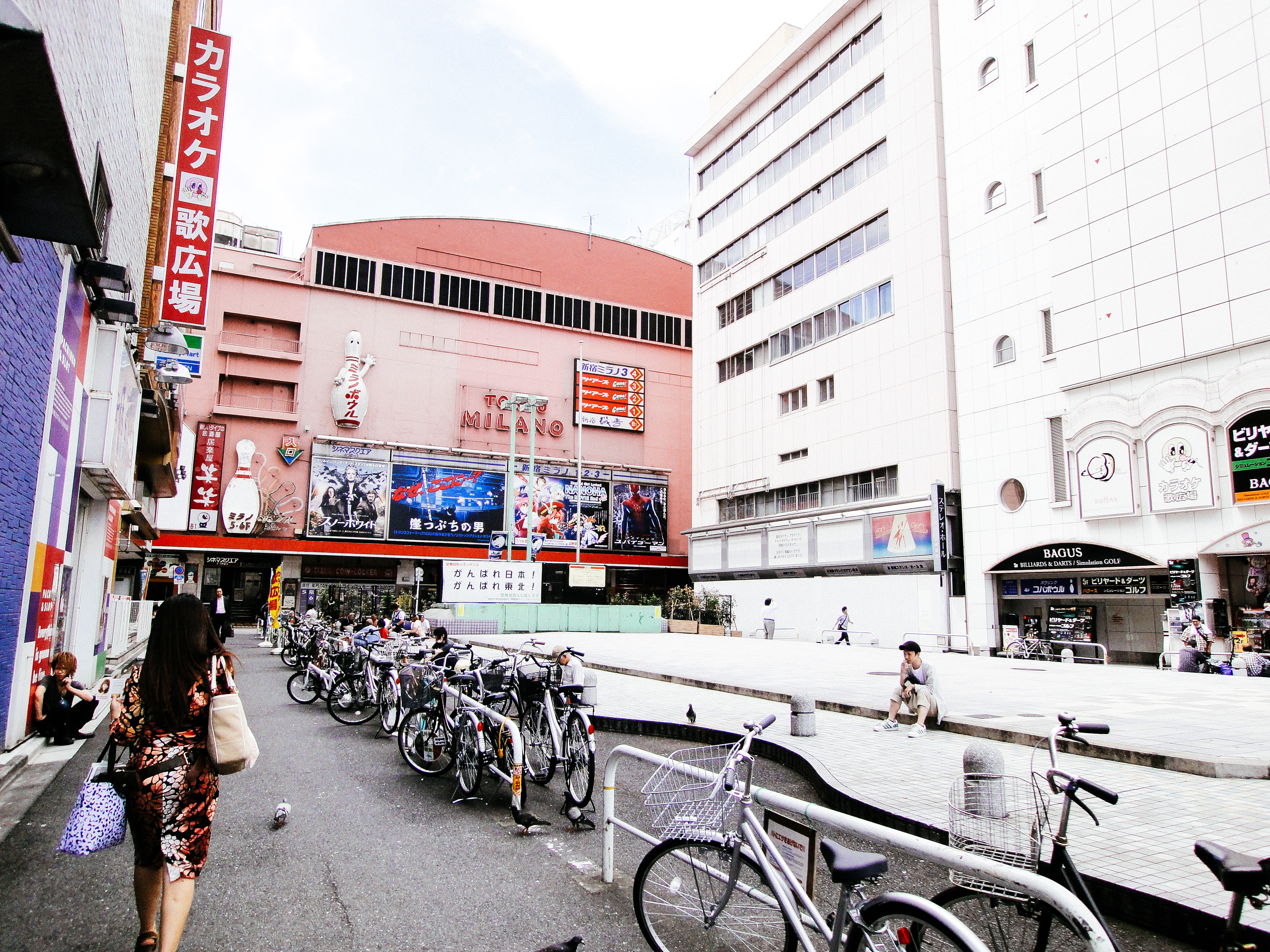
The Shinjuku Milano-za, a cinema whose hall was filmed during the projection of Death & Rebirth

For "Sincerely Yours", the staff decided to include live-action sequences representing Shinji's inner world; these feature footage of street lamps, trains, graffiti, and the series' three main female voice actresses, Megumi Hayashibara, Kotono Mitsuishi, and Yūko Miyamura. A crew called the "Special Production Team" filmed the sequences and optically distorted the footage. Anno wrote the script and worked with special effects director Shinji Higuchi, with whom he discussed ideas and compared opinions on every frame of the sequences. To portray Shinji's world in harsher tones than the television ending, the filmmakers used multiple overlapping or reversed rhodium glasses and three-dimensional computer graphics. One scene depicts a panorama of a city resembling Tokyo-3, which the staff created by integrating CGI elements. The crew filmed other shots at the Shinjuku Milano-za cinema (新宿ミラノ座), located in the Shinjuku district of Tokyo.

In the final cut, Gainax also added a shot of a cinema auditorium filled with viewers of Neon Genesis Evangelion: Death and Rebirth. At the end of the segment, the staff inserted still images of graffiti on the walls of the Gainax Shop, doodles, and pseudo-emails purportedly written by fans of the series, including the words "Anno, I'll kill you!!" (庵野、殺す！！). The staff created the letters ad hoc, drawing on emails that Gainax had received. Moreover, most of the fictional letters contain no criticism and instead praise the creators following the release of Death and Rebirth. According to an official pamphlet for the film, the staff created the fictional emails to simulate hypothetical fan reactions and reflect on the relationships that develop "between a work and its admirers".

The authors originally planned a longer live-action segment with substantially different content from the final version. The original segment centered on Asuka, who would wake up in an apartment after drinking and spending the night with Toji, with whom she would have a sexual relationship. Misato would live in the neighboring apartment, while Rei Ayanami, Asuka's rival in the original series, would work as her colleague and senpai. In the alternative universe depicted in the live-action footage, Shinji would never have existed; while walking through the streets of Tokyo-2, however, Asuka would hear his voice calling her. In the live-action segment, director Anno voices Shinji instead of his original voice actress, Megumi Ogata. The filmmakers later incorporated some of the unused footage into the film's trailers. During production, Anno decided to cut the segment; according to Evangelion Chronicle magazine, he made the decision after the production unexpectedly expanded into a two-film theatrical release. The crew began filming on January 19, 1997, and continued for several days. They filmed pylons, bodies of water, and urban scenery representing Tokyo-2 in the snowy city of Matsumoto, Nagano Prefecture. The crew also filmed in Kōfu and shot the movie-theater scene on March 14 during the premiere of Death and Rebirth. On May 8, they filmed three dummies representing Rei, Asuka, and Misato on a street in a Japanese city. Filming concluded on May 10, when Anno and other crew members shot footage at a playground.

=== Music ===
Music composer Shirō Sagisu, who had also written the music for the original series, composed the soundtrack for The End of Evangelion. The film also features music by classical composer Johann Sebastian Bach. The staff titled the twenty-fifth episode "Air" as a homage to the second movement of Orchestral Suite No. 3, known as "Air on the G String", which accompanies one of the episode's key scenes. The second half of the film also features the tenth movement of Bach's cantata "Herz und Mund und Tat und Leben". Critics have compared the use of classical music during violent scenes to Stanley Kubrick's works. In an interview, Anno was asked about similarities with Kubrick, but he claimed that his films did not influence him "that much". Sagisu arranged and recorded a new version of "Air on the G String" for the film, while an existing recording of "Jesu, Joy of Man's Desiring" by pianist Jan Panenka was used. The production commissioned two original songs for the film. The first one, "Thanatos: If I Can't Be Yours", based on a soundtrack from the original series, features gospel music singer Loren and artist Martin Lascelles, who performed under the stage name "Mash". Loren recorded the single in London in June 1997 under the supervision of Toshimichi Ōtsuki. The film later uses the song for the credits between the two segments of The End of Evangelion.

Arianne performed the second song, "Komm, süsser Tod" ("Come, Sweet Death"), using English lyrics translated from lyrics by Anno. An official booklet about the Evangelion music noted that Mobile Suit Gundam III: Encounters in Space, the third feature film in the Mobile Suit Gundam theatrical saga, had employed a similar device years earlier, with its director writing a song for the concluding film of an animated series. The song shares its title with Bach's composition "Komm, süßer Tod, komm selge Ruh", while critics have compared its melody to that of "Hey Jude" by the Beatles. Sagisu attempted to rotate the guitar sound of "Komm, süsser Tod" across all surround channels. Anno asked him to compose the piece so that every element, from the harmonic progressions to the instrumental layering, would match the onscreen imagery. In "Sincerely Yours", the filmmakers used a Japanese song sung by preschool children in the playground scene. Producer Satsukawa and a special production team visited Haishima Municipal Kindergarten in Akishima, Japan, which Mitsuhisa Ishikawa's daughter attended, to record the song. The production team composed and recorded eighteen songs for The End of Evangelion. The staff initially intended to include a song titled "Everything You've Ever Dreamed" in the Human Instrumentality sequences, but discarded it during production and later included it on the album Refrain of Evangelion. The producers released the soundtrack across two albums in August and November 1997.

== Cultural references and themes ==
=== Religion, philosophy and psychology ===
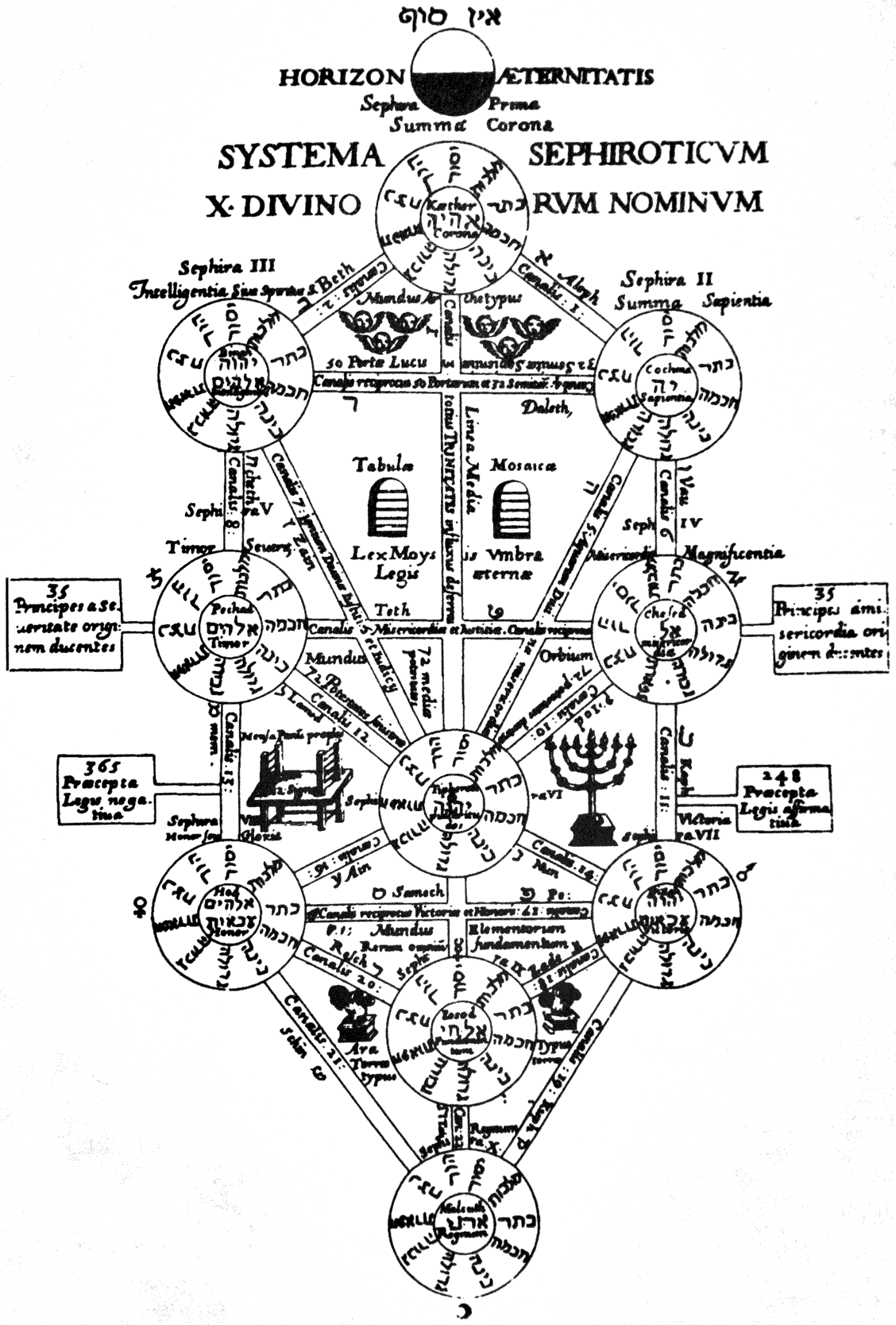
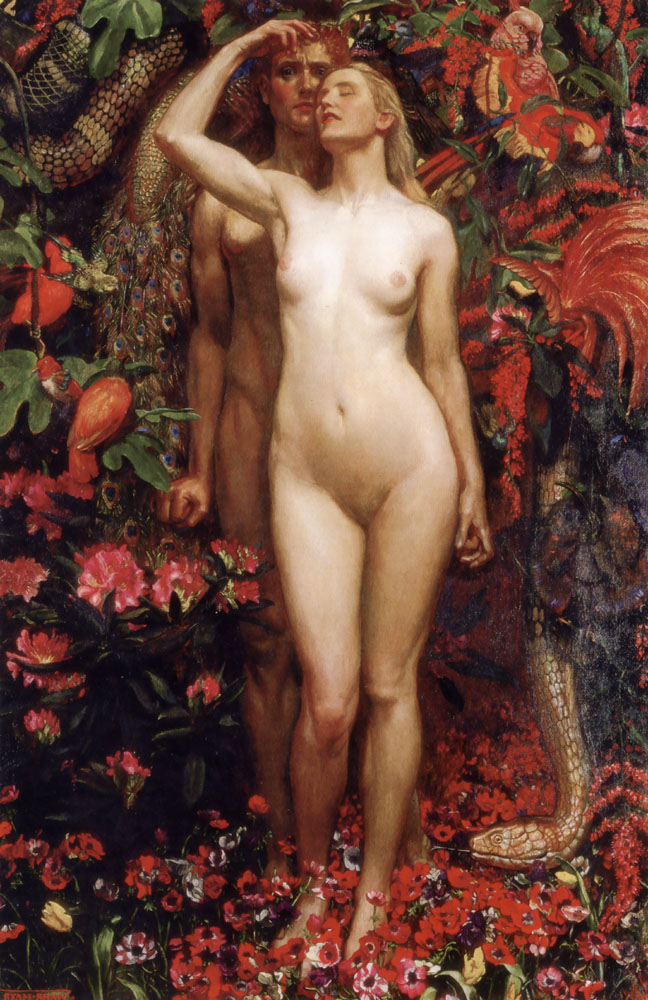
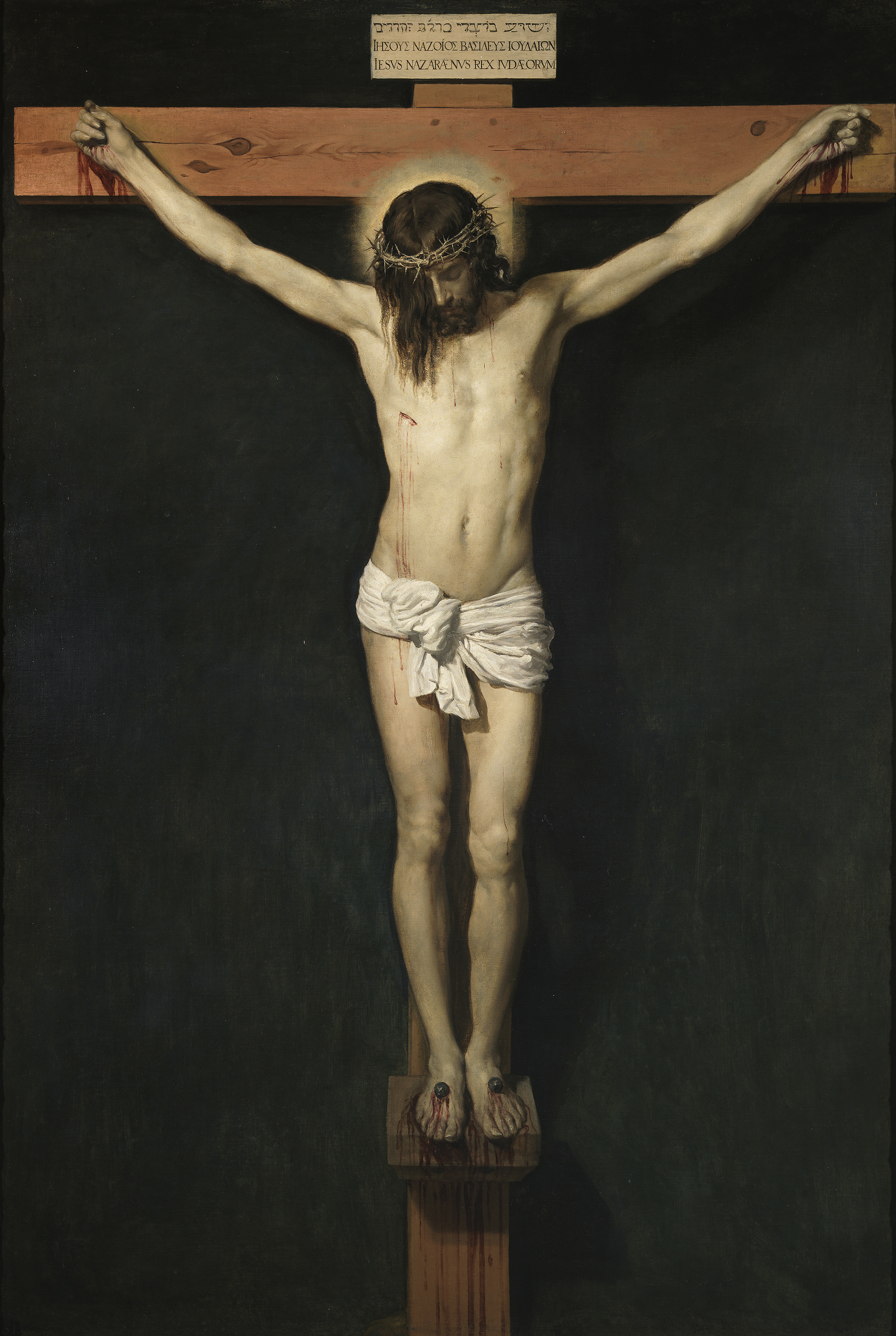
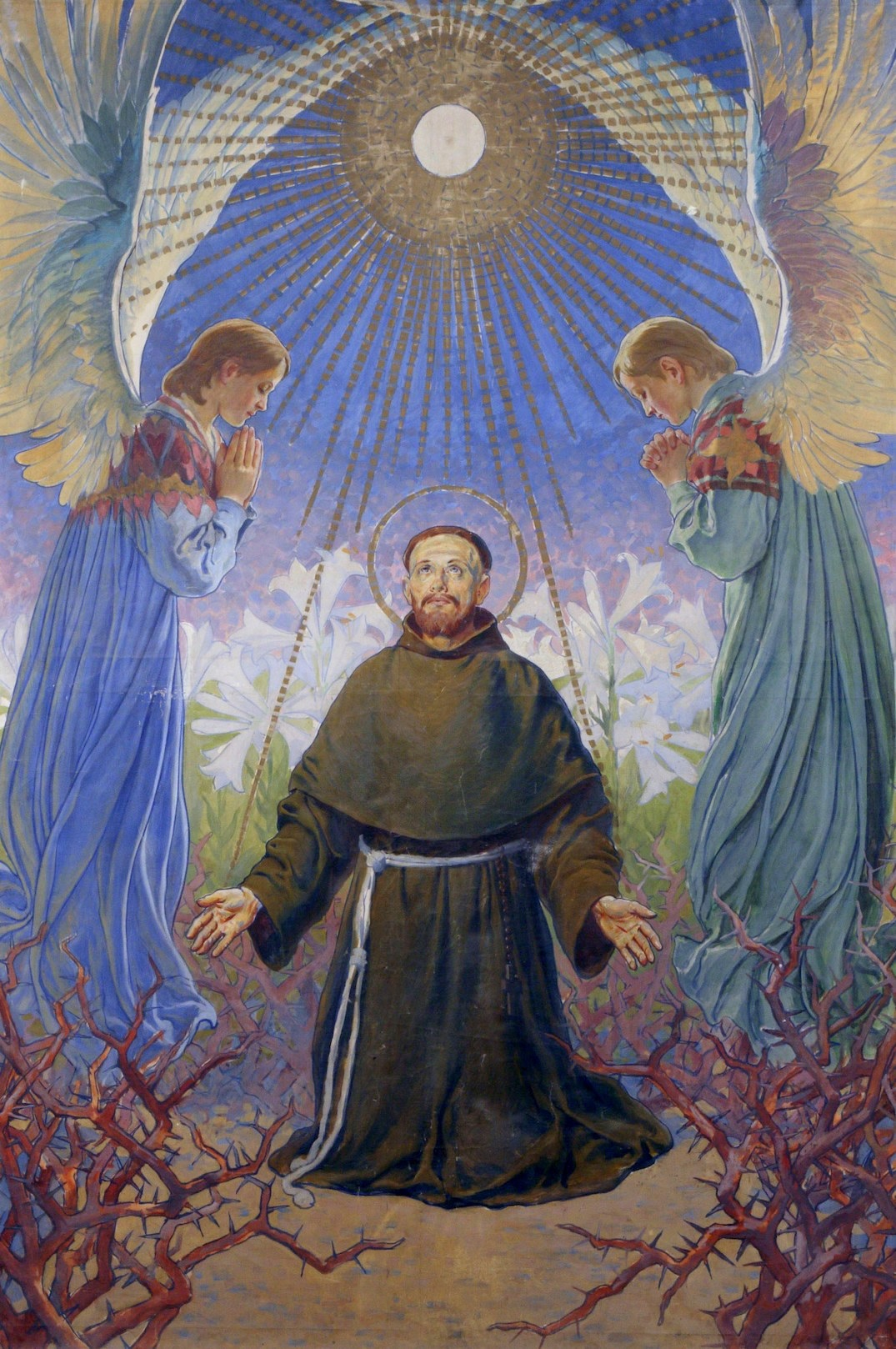
The End of Evangelion contains references to the Tree of Sephiroth of the Jewish Kabbalah, the Genesis creation narrative, the crucifixion of Jesus Christ, and the Catholic stigmata.

Like the original series, The End of Evangelion features numerous psychological, philosophical, and religious themes and imagery, in a style that official materials describe as "pedantic". Anno incorporated various terms to create atmosphere and suggest a deeper meaning, allowing him, in his own words, to sound "intelligent". Throughout the film, elements of Judaism and Christianity are mentioned, such as the number of the beast, 666, the tree of life, the Tree of the Sephiroth, the Catholic stigmata, the universal flood, Noah's Ark, the Genesis creation narrative, and the Book of Revelation. Writer Deniz Yenimazman also interpreted Shinji as a messianic figure, while scholar Gavin McDowell likened the giant Lilith to "the androgynous, hermaphroditic Adam described in rabbinic literature".

In the early stages of Instrumentality, the Eva Series forms a giant Sephirotic Tree in the sky, with each Eva assuming the role of a sephirah. During his metaphorical sacrifice, Shinji occupies the Tiferet sephirah. Slant Magazine's Michael Peterson noted that Christian Kabbalah associates Tiferet with Christ on the cross and, consequently, with the point where the sacred meets the profane. Anime Invasion magazine also noted that 16th-century Jewish mystical writings predicted a decline of the divine light in every human being, followed by the destruction of humanity in a catastrophic event. Eva-01 transforms into the Tree of Life in the following scenes, which an official pamphlet for the film connects to the inverted tree of the Kabbalah and a similar tree found in Hindu scriptures. Seele calls this process the "Red Earth Purification Ceremony"; the name draws on theories concerning the etymology of Adam, according to which the name means "earth" or "red". The purification ceremony also references misogi, a Shinto purification ritual. During Instrumentality, the film also mentions the Jewish chamber of Guf, which Rei Ayanami opens during the Third Impact. In the original storyboard, the term indicates Lilith's stigmatas. Eva-01 serves as a "medium", or yorishiro, in the process. According to official materials, the Shinto term refers to an object that attracts divine spirits, known as kami in Japanese, or provides a medium through which they manifest. Seele also describes Instrumentality as a rite of passage; Evangelion Chronicle magazine linked the term to Arnold van Gennep's anthropological concept of the same name and to the sacrament of baptism.

The film also references the psychoanalysis of Sigmund Freud, including the dichotomy between Eros and Thanatos. According to critics, the characters remain caught between the sexual and life drive, or libido, and the destructive, suicidal drive of destrudo, a concept theorized by Edoardo Weiss. According to Evangelion Chronicle, an official encyclopedia about the series, the presence of destrudo in Shinji's mind is necessary to initiate Instrumentality. Critics have interpreted several scenes as representations of Shinji's sexual instincts, including those in which he sees Asuka in bed and Misato having sex with her boyfriend, Ryoji Kaji. They have similarly associated his death drive with scenes in which he destroys a sand pyramid, strangles Asuka, and sees childish drawings of dead animals. According to writers Kazuhisa Fujie and Martin Foster, the lyrics of the film's two songs, "Thanatos" and "Komm, süsser Tod", emphasize the importance of this dialectic of drives to the protagonist's development. Fujie and Foster linked the Human Instrumentality Project, during which Shinji wishes for the death of all human beings, including himself, to Thanatos and destrudo. In the final scenes of The End of Evangelion, Shinji rejects Instrumentality, while Yui tells him that all living beings can regain their human form if they possess the will to live, reaffirming the life drive. Critics also identified the psychological concept of the return to the womb in the core of Eva-01, in the stigmata and on Lilith's forehead, and in the shape of the sandpit in which Shinji builds a sandcastle as a child.

=== Popular culture and autobiographical inspiration ===
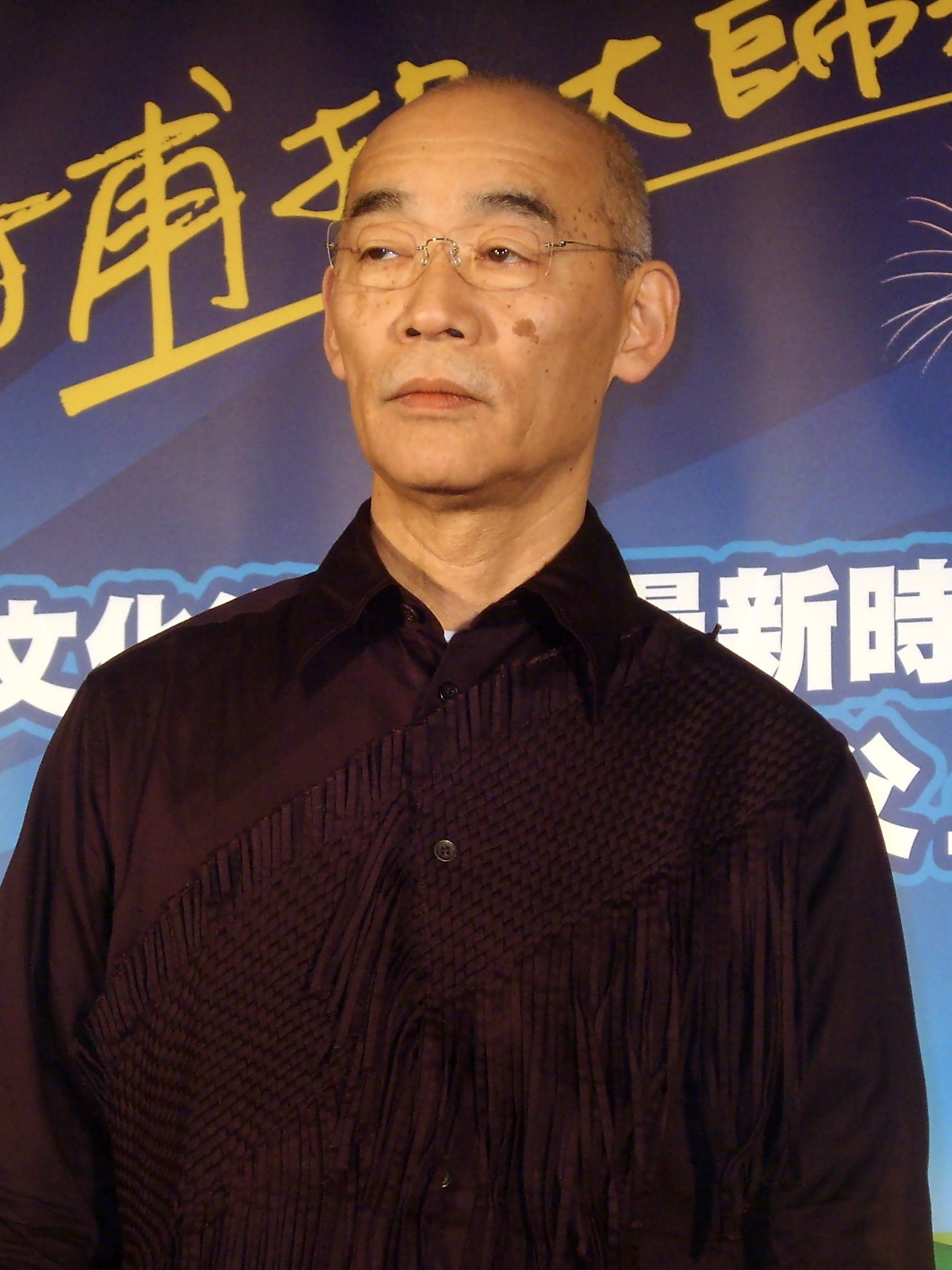
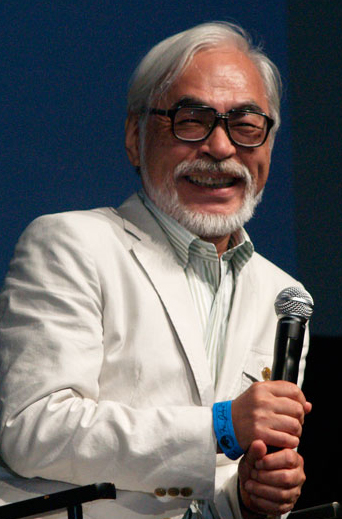
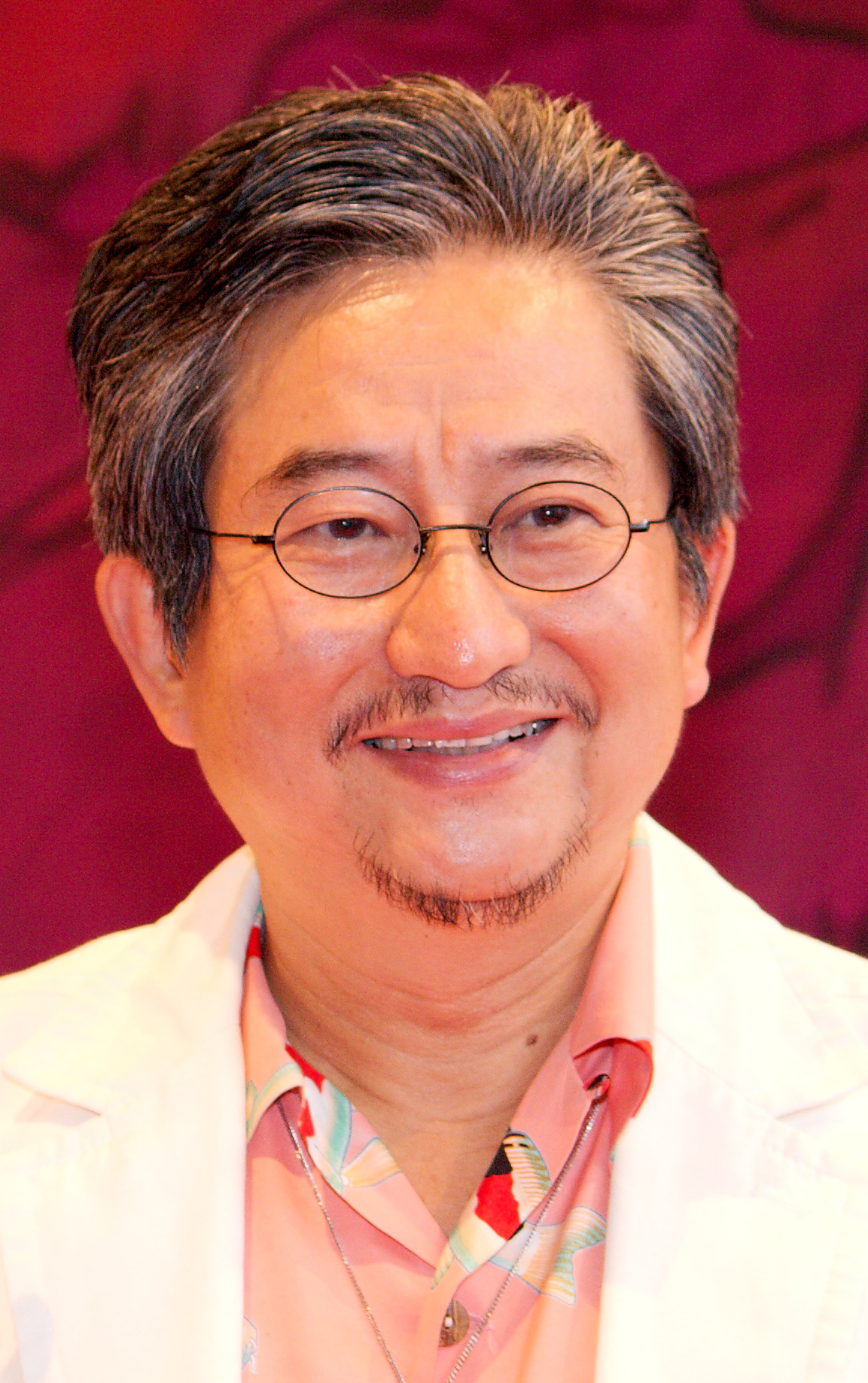
The works of Yoshiyuki Tomino, Hayao Miyazaki and Go Nagai influenced the staff of The End of Evangelion.

For the plot of The End of Evangelion, the staff drew inspiration from Japanese works such as Devilman by Gō Nagai, Ideon: Be Invoked by Yoshiyuki Tomino, and the final chapter of the Space Runaway Ideon series, which depicts the extermination of humanity in a scenario similar to that of The End of Evangelion. Critics have compared the massacre of Nerv personnel to the slaughter aboard the Solo Ship, the Tree of Life to the Ide, and the Third Impact to the final Armageddon caused by the Ideon. The final volume of Miyazaki's Nausicaä of the Valley of the Wind manga also influenced Anno. Critics and animation scholars have compared the underlying concept of Instrumentality to Cordwainer Smith's Instrumentality of Mankind and the concepts of the noosphere and transhumanism, as well as to the theories of Jesuit philosopher Pierre Teilhard de Chardin, who argued that the entire universe would ultimately unite and converge toward a single point, the Omega Point. Scholar Alba G. Torrents also compared the Human Instrumentality Project to Jacques Lacan's psychoanalytic theory, according to which the complete fulfillment of one's desires corresponds to death.

Other critics have compared the apocalyptic vision of The End of Evangelion to that of earlier works of science fiction, such as Greg Bear's Blood Music and Arthur C. Clarke's Childhood's End. Ex magazine reviewer Scott Rider likened "Air" to the works of Harlan Ellison, while Protoculture Addicts magazine speculated that Anno may have drawn inspiration from Kihachi Okamoto's Battle of Okinawa. Critic Nozomi Oomori and writer Hiroyuki Morioka have compared The End of Evangelion's cryptic nature to that of Stanley Kubrick's 1968 film 2001: A Space Odyssey, as well as to widescreen baroque science fiction, a genre characterized by extravagance, violence, and intricate plots. Takahashi Watanabe of Animage magazine noted that an image of a planetary syzygy appears in the film's second half, paralleling a similar image in Kubrick's 2001. Critics have also interpreted other sequences as tributes to Karel Thole's illustration on the cover of Howard Fast's science fiction collection The General Zapped an Angel, which depicts the face of a giant being lying in a red sea. Esther Rosenfield argued that the film's use of editing techniques such as rapid cutting, superimposition, and the scratched-on Gainax logo reflects the influence of experimental filmmaker Stan Brakhage. River Seager interpreted the apocalypse depicted in the film as part of the legacy of the mecha genre, particularly the concept of Newtypes, a more evolved form of humanity introduced in Mobile Suit Gundam. According to Seager, the imagery of the Human Instrumentality Project recalls scenes between Amuro Ray and Lalah Sune in Gundam, while the film's final scene resembles the climax of Phoenix 2772 (1980), in which the hero and heroine find themselves on an empty beach after the world has been engulfed in flames.

The End of Evangelion reflects the state of mind of the staff, particularly director Anno's tense emotional state. Animage magazine described it as a shishōsetsu (I-novel), a form of Japanese confessional literature. Anno himself described his self-exposure as a form of "masturbation" show in interviews; He also described the final episode of the original series in particularly explicit terms, saying that it was "as if, instead of sperm, I had thrown a bucket of water" at the audience. According to scholar Yuya Sato, the first half of Neon Genesis Evangelion employs elements traditionally associated with shōnen manga, aimed primarily at a young male audience, such as battles, action, and cooperation between characters, before shifting in its second half toward a more introspective and intimate style resembling that of shōjo manga, traditionally aimed at a young female audience; Sato argued that the opening masturbation scene in The End of Evangelion marks a return to shōnen elements, which fans had sought after the original series finale. Fans have interpreted Shinji as a representation of Anno and Asuka as a representation of her voice actress, Yūko Miyamura, whom rumors romantically linked to Anno. Anime critics have likewise interpreted the violent scenes as a response to the criticism raised after the conclusion of the original series and as retribution against fans. Kazuya Tsurumaki, however, stated that the staff had conceived the ending as violent and dark from the outset, saying, "It wasn't a bitterness toward the fans. A lot of people think anime should always have happy endings, but that's not always the case. We wanted to educate the fans that anime can have bitter endings."

=== Final scene ===
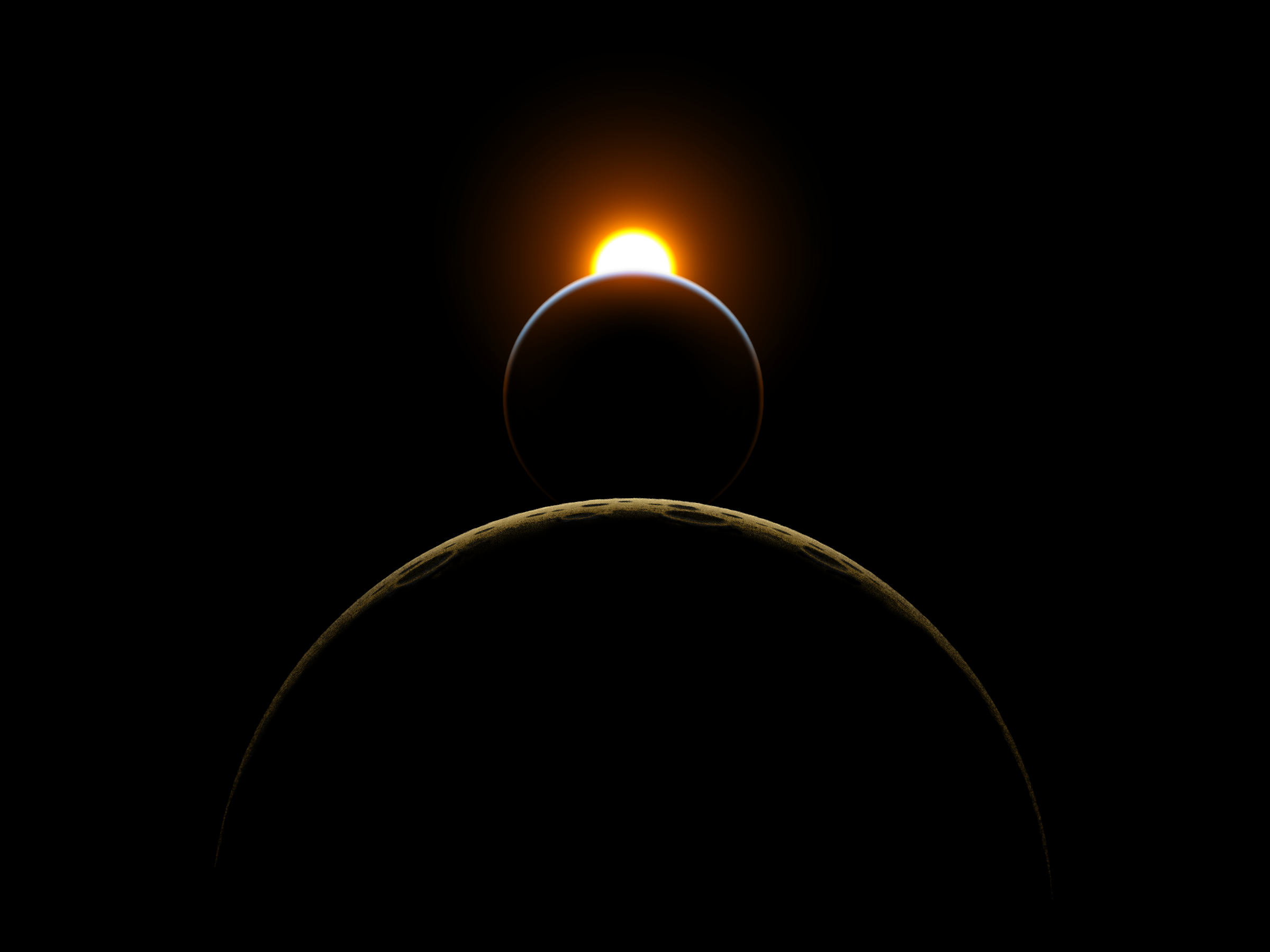
The film's ending features an image of a planetary syzygy, which critics have compared to similar imagery in 2001: A Space Odyssey by Stanley Kubrick.

In the final scene of The End of Evangelion, Shinji awakens with Asuka on a deserted beach; Shinji strangles Asuka, who then caresses his cheek. He begins to cry, loosening his grip, as she says, "How disgusting", or "I feel sick". Scholars and anime critics have interpreted the pair, who survive the Third Impact, as metaphorical counterparts to Adam and Eve and "the new primeval father and mother" of a new humanity. According to Hiroyuki Morioka, everyday life will begin again. Asuka's final line and Shinji's strangulation of her generated debate among fans of the series. AnimeNation interpreted the phrase "I feel sick" as expressing Asuka's realization that another human being, Shinji, exists independently of her. Asuka uses the same phrase in a scene from the director's cut of the twenty-second episode, "Don't Be"; disgusted by human contact, she refuses to share her space or existence with Shinji or Misato. According to AnimeNation, Shinji strangles Asuka to prove to himself that she is a distinct being, the Other, while Asuka's final words may rework Jean-Paul Sartre's statement, "Hell is other people". The series' official figurine game offers a similar interpretation::

Shinji renounced the world where all hearts had melted into one and accepted each other unconditionally. His desire to live with 'others'—other hearts that would sometimes reject him, even deny him. That is why the first thing he did after coming to his senses was to place his hands around Asuka's neck. To feel the existence of an 'other'. To confirm rejection and denial.

According to the contemporary artist and writer Takashi Murakami, Shinji, by attempting to kill Asuka, asks her for help and seeks her understanding. Asuka feels disgusted because she regards Shinji as pathetic and capable of communicating only with himself. Murakami thus interpreted her response as reflecting society's view of Shinji. Anime critics have contrasted the scene with the optimistic tone of the series finale, interpreting Shinji's decision to stop strangling Asuka after he begins to cry as an expression of disgust toward himself. They have also argued that Asuka's final line reasserts the pride and selfishness that characterize her and that the words "I feel sick" suggest that neither character has changed or become a better person and that the film's events ultimately lack meaning. Nozomi Omori compared the scene to J. G. Ballard's collection of science fiction short stories The Terminal Beach. Writer Kazuhisa Fujie interpreted the strangulation as a reference to the Freudian concept of Thanatos, which pervades every moment of life, and to the impossibility of living alone, an idea reflected in the title "I need you". According to Fujie, Shinji loosens his grip and allows his libido toward the Other, Asuka, to prevail once more, thereby offering her his sincerity. Anime critic Vrai Kaiser argued that The End of Evangelion has gained an undeserved reputation as an act of "trolling" by Hideaki Anno toward the audience. According to Kaiser, the film actually suggests that imaginary realities can sometimes provide a necessary refuge, although they cannot sustain a person indefinitely; Asuka's final caress of Shinji's face represents the hope that, despite loneliness and the pain people inflict on one another, they can still show each other kindness. Assistant director Tsurumaki offered a different interpretation of the sequence, saying:

"Well, my personal view is, 'Do we really need to complement these troubles of the heart?' Regardless of whether or not we are complemented, have troubles, or find our answers, interpersonal relations exist, and the world goes on. I thought the last scene meant to say that life goes on, but I could be wrong".

=== Critique of otaku ===
The End of Evangelion continues the series' central theme, presenting a "story of communication". The feature film has been interpreted as a criticism of otaku—obsessive fans of animation, video games, and comic books. Hideaki Anno, himself an otaku, has criticized the subculture for what he considers its excessive isolation, self-referentiality, and introversion; after the end of the series, he criticized fans who immersed themselves in the Internet as a means of escaping reality, comparing their opinions to "graffiti in public toilets". In 1996, Anno expressed disappointment at the reception of the original series, which he believed viewers had turned into a refuge from unpleasant aspects of reality. Responding to subsequent criticism, he stated that, "My own feeling is all about the message I put at the beginning of the twenty-sixth episode. There is no fiction in that shot. It's real, and it's true". With The End of Evangelion he intended to "purify" viewers by prompting them to wake up and return to reality. He regarded this criticism, despite its confrontational appearance, as a form of "fan service that doesn't seem fan service", because it is still useful to viewers. According to Kazuya Tsurumaki, Evangelion contains a message aimed at anime fans, including Anno himself. "In other words, it's useless for non-anime fans to watch it. If a person who can already live and communicate normally watches it, they won't learn anything. ... Don't drag the past around. Find the next thing that interests you. ... It's always better to let something that has finished [Evangelion] end".

Anime scholar Nicolle Lamerichs argued that End of Evangelion breaks the fourth wall and pushes its fans to reflect "on the meaning of the narrative, fan culture, and escapism". Critics have interpreted Instrumentality, in which individual physical existence dissolves into an accommodating cosmic fusion, as a metaphor for the condition of otaku. According to Japanese critic Manabu Tsuribe, the film ends when Shinji rejects Instrumentality and recognizes Asuka as a being separate from himself—the Other, whom consciousness can never completely internalize. Tsuribe interpreted Shinji as embodying the closed interiority characteristic of otaku mentality; in his reading, Asuka constitutes an ambiguous existence beyond Shinji's control, and her ambiguity mirrors that of Evangelion itself. Tsuribe also interpreted their violent and possessive relationship as an ironic criticism of the escapism of anime fans who retreat into their inner worlds and struggle to relate to other people. According to Nozomi Omori, the film concerns "living with anime" and can be interpreted as Anno's attempt to argue with himself. Omori and Tsuribe both compared The End of Evangelion to Mamoru Oshii's Urusei Yatsura 2: Beautiful Dreamer, in which the characters discover that their world is a dream shaped by Lum's wishes and ultimately return to an animated reality. By contrast, Omori argued that in Evangelion, "after hearing 'I feel sick' one cannot return to the animated world" and instead finds oneself immediately thrust back into real life.

Anime critic Vrai Kaiser interpreted the opening scene with Shinji as a critique of the fetishization of female characters among male otaku audiences. Kaiser also viewed Shinji's violent behavior as an instance of "mental health toxicity becoming masculine violence". In the second part of The End of Evangelion, Shinji discusses the nature of dreams with Rei Ayanami. During the live-action sequence, Ayanami tells him that a person cannot dream alone, since such a dream would merely constitute an alternative to reality, and accuses Shinji of using fantasy to deceive himself about reality. As Rei speaks, the film shows photographs of graffiti at Gainax's offices and images of fans at the Shinjuku Milano cinema, leading critics to interpret the dream as a metaphor for anime. The sequence also displays the caption "Does it feel good?" (気持ち、いいの？); according to an official film pamphlet, the question addresses both the fans and the staff of Neon Genesis Evangelion. According to Yūichirō Oguro, editor of materials for the series' home-video editions, the staff included the sequence to suggest that anime fans share Shinji's problems and to criticize those who seek refuge in fiction. According to Andrea Fontana, a writer and scholar of Japanese animation, the sequence allows otaku to "admire themselves, discuss themselves, just as Shinji did with himself", interpreting the scene as "a desirable rebirth for everyone". Near the end of the film, Lilith, bearing Rei's appearance, disintegrates after Shinji rejects the cosmic fusion of Instrumentality. Oguro argued that Rei, the series' most popular character, represents Neon Genesis Evangelion's pleasure principle and interpreted her disintegration as marking the end of the otaku dream and a return to reality.

== Release ==
=== Marketing ===
Prior to the film's release, companies distributed a wide range of The End of Evangelion merchandise, including posters, drinks, action figures and clothing. Theaters also sold an official A4-sized illustrated booklet for ¥800 about Evangelion containing explanations and interviews with staff and voice actors, which Western fans dubbed the "Red Cross Book". In 1997, Kadokawa Shoten released two filmbook volumes of The End of Evangelion: one on "Air", on October 28, 1997, and the other on "Sincerely Yours", on November 18 of the same year. In 2015, for the Blu-ray DVD Box release of Neon Genesis Evangelion, TV spot previews for the film were also included.

Bandai distributed a trading card game titled Evangelion Carddass Masters G (エヴァンゲリオン カードダスマスターズG), which accompanied the Japanese magazine RPG as a supplement in September 1998. Production materials such as storyboards, sketches, and preparatory studies were collected in two books called Groundwork of Evangelion: The Movie, which were published on October 26, 2001, and January 18, 2002, respectively. In 2012, during the Shiohaku Expo 2012, organizers erected a reproduction of Rei Ayanami near the headquarters of Nippon Television, drawing inspiration from the scene in which Rei grows to a gigantic size after merging with Lilith.

=== Japanese release ===
The End of Evangelion was theatrically released in Japan on July 19, 1997. Advance ticket sales began on May 17, and customers could use unused tickets for Death and Rebirth to see the film. Viewers received copies of the film's official poster. Yomiuri Hall Cinema hosted a preview screening on July 17. In 1998, the filmmakers combined the partially overlapping Death and Rebirth and The End of Evangelion, removing their shared material, and released the resulting version as Revival of Evangelion. It opened in theaters on March 7 and attracted more than 300,000 viewers. In 2006, the Tokyo International Film Festival screened The End of Evangelion in Akihabara. In 2014, the festival screened Revival of Evangelion at Toho Cinemas in Nihonbashi during its 27th edition. On August 28 and 29, 2015, Toho Cinemas in Shinjuku, Tokyo, screened the film alongside the first episode of Neon Genesis Evangelion, "Angel Attack", to celebrate the release of the series' Blu-ray box set. On December 4, 2020, a new run for Revival of Evangelion in special screenings across Japan between January 8 and 22, 2021, was announced.

==== Home video release ====
On August 12 and September 9, 1998, two Laserdiscs called "Genesis 0:13" and "Genesis 0:14" containing "Air" and "Sincerely Yours", were released as part of the home video edition of the original series. On December 23, 1998, a Japanese Laserdisc box set titled Shinseiki Evangelion gekijō-ban Box LD (新世紀エヴァンゲリオン劇場版BOX LD; "Neon Genesis Evangelion movie version Box LD") followed, containing a version of Death & Rebirth called Death(true)² and both segments of The End of Evangelion. The box set also included extras, an illustrated booklet, and the storyboards of the feature films. In June 2001, the films were released as part of a release called Second Impact Box.

In 2003, Gainax released a DVD edition of the animated series called Renewal of Evangelion, which introduced a new 5.1-channel surround sound track mix for The End of Evangelion. Under Anno's direction, the sound team reviewed and remixed the dialogue, music, and sound effects for the new format. The team completed the stereo mix for "Sincerely Yours" on March 12 and 13 and that for "Air" on March 15, 2003. The tenth volume of the Renewal edition included the new version of The End of Evangelion, while the eleventh DVD contained production materials. In June of the same year, Gainax released a DVD box set containing all twenty-six episodes of the series and the two concluding feature films. The Western Platinum Edition, based on the Japanese Renewal, omitted the films. Renewal of Evangelion and subsequent Blu-ray editions also included a version of the discarded live-action sequence. Because the production had changed plans during filming and subsequently lost some of the original material, Anno could only reconstruct the original concept as closely as possible without additional filming or recording. He personally supplied Shinji's final line, which the production had not recorded at the time. King Records released a box set with Revival on August 1, 2007, under the title "Neon Genesis Evangelion DVD-Box '07 Edition". In August 2015, to celebrate the series' 20th anniversary, The End of Evangelion was released in a Blu-ray box set of Neon Genesis Evangelion in HD video. In June 2019, in conjunction with the release on Netflix, the Blu-rays were released again.

=== English-language release ===
North American company A.D. Vision, which handled the original series' adaptation, initially showed no interest in acquiring the distribution rights to The End of Evangelion because Gainax demanded a licensing fee that the company considered too high. In July 1998, A.D. Vision still announced plans to negotiate with Gainax for an overseas release. In 1999, Manga Entertainment acquired the rights for US$2 million. The company initially announced an October release for the Western edition of The End of Evangelion, but later postponed it. Manga Entertainment initially stated that it would interview Anno and Tsurumaki to provide Western fans with an explanation of the film, but the final DVD included no such interviews, and the company eventually postponed the release until September 2002.

Rei Ayanami's English-language voice actress Amanda Winn Lee wrote the scripts for the English subtitles and dubbed adaptation of The End of Evangelion. Winn Lee also produced and directed the dub. Although most of the voice actors reprised their roles from ADV's English adaptation of the series, the production recast several supporting roles because the original actors were unavailable. To accommodate voice actors living in different parts of the United States, the production team recorded the dub in Los Angeles, Houston, and New York City. In late 2020, GKIDS acquired the North American theatrical and home-video rights to the film, the Death (True)² version of Death, and the television series, while Anime Limited acquired the corresponding rights in the United Kingdom.

The End of Evangelion was included in the Standard Edition, the Collector's Edition and the Ultimate Edition Blu-ray releases of the series in late 2021. Also included was extra content, such as the deleted live-action scene and a short documentary about its making. In the United Kingdom, Anime Limited screened Death (True)² and The End of Evangelion in theaters on November 11 and 14, 2021. Although Anime Limited originally advertised the Manga Entertainment English-language dub, the DCP distributed to theaters for the November 11 screenings instead contained the more recent Netflix dub. Anime Limited corrected the error in time for the November 14 screenings. On February 21, 2024, GKIDS announced a nationwide theatrical North American run for March 17 and 20, presenting the film in its original Japanese with English subtitles. The release grossed $1.31 million in the United States and $1.58 million worldwide across 570 locations.

== Reception ==
=== Box office and public response ===
Sales of Japanese home video releases of End of Evangelion (April 28, 2008)
Title	Release	Units sold
DVD The Feature Film	September 22, 1999	16,000
Second Impact DVD-Box	June 22, 2001	4,000
Neon Genesis Evangelion DVD-box	June 25, 2003	26,000
Revival of Evangelion new edition	November 27, 2003	32,000
DTS Collector's Edition	November 3, 2004	1,000
DVD-Box '07 Edition	August 1, 2007	26,000

In 1997, Neon Genesis Evangelion stood at the center of national debate in Japan and became a social phenomenon after its ending. The controversy surrounding the original ending attracted large audiences to theaters, including viewers curious about the debate. The film also drew attention from newspapers and audiences outside the usual anime fanbase. The End of Evangelion surpassed Death and Rebirth in attendance, attracting 400,000 viewers in the first three days of its release. It ranked third at the Japanese box office that week, behind The Lost World: Jurassic Park and Hayao Miyazaki's Princess Mononoke. The movie earned approximately ¥1.5 billion in Japanese distributor rentals, equivalent to about $12 million at the time, becoming the fourth-highest-grossing Japanese feature film of 1997. Japanese media at the time highlighted the contrast between the film's poster and that of Princess Mononoke, which similarly featured mature and violent themes; the poster for Princess Mononoke carried the tagline "Live!", while that of The End of Evangelion read "Wouldn't it be nice if everyone would just die?". The film generated considerable anticipation, with long lines forming in Japan for premiere tickets and attracting further media attention.

The End of Evangelion generated controversy over its sexual and violent content, particularly its opening scene, in which Shinji masturbates beside the comatose Asuka; fans have described the sequence as one of the most unpleasant in the history of Japanese animation. Debate over the two endings of Evangelion persisted online for more than twenty years after the film's release. Anime scholar Brian Ruh observed that, despite depicting the ending more concretely than the television series' finale, The End of Evangelion retained enough surreal imagery and unresolved questions to generate "plenty of fan argument about what the ending was supposed to mean". Collider writer Lucas Kloberdanz-Dyck similarly stated that the film "added more confusion", yet "still holds a great deal of meaning that fans can relate to". The film generated further controversy when Nippon Television aired it after midnight on August 25, 2014, and cut or censored several sequences, prompting protests from fans and the film's creators. TBS aired the film on August 30 of the same year at 2:53 a.m., recording an audience share of 0.9%.

The film's soundtrack album, released in September 1997, sold over 100,000 copies in its debut week. The album reached the top three of the Oricon album charts, a feat no anime soundtrack had achieved since Galaxy Express 999 and that no other anime soundtrack would repeat for another decade. The soundtrack sold about 400,000 copies, while the single "Thanatos" sold another 600,000. According to a 2015 estimate by Merumo.ne.jp, The End of Evangelion grossed ¥2.5 billion in total, or over $20 million since 1997. Manga Entertainment's English edition ranked twentieth among the best-selling DVDs in the United States during its debut week. In 1998, The End of Evangelion topped the Anime Grand Prix, an annual survey of the best contemporary anime by the Japanese magazine Animage. The song "Thanatos - If I Can't Be Yours" ranked fourth among the best music tracks. According to Comic Book Resources, The End of Evangelion, with 8.51 points, was the anime purchased by Netflix with the highest score on the MyAnimeList platform in 2020, and, with a score of 8.1, among the highest-rated Japanese animated films on the Internet Movie Database in 2021.

=== Critical response ===
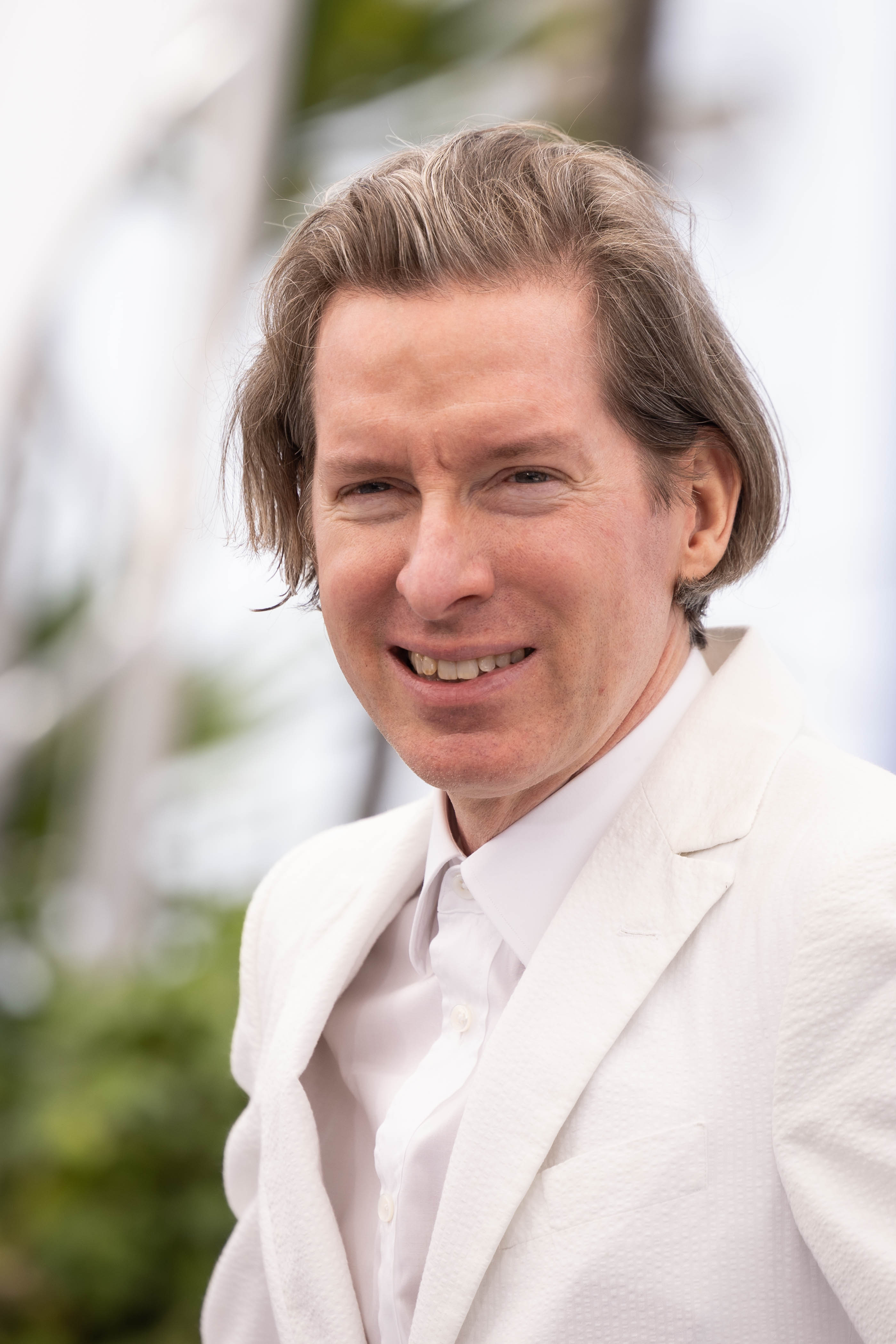
Director Wes Anderson ranked The End of Evangelion among the ten best animated films.

The End of Evangelion received mostly positive reviews from critics upon release and has since appeared frequently on lists of the greatest anime films. Collider writer Jeremy Urquhart described it as a cult classic animated film. On the review aggregator website Rotten Tomatoes, 92% of 12 critics' reviews are positive, with an average rating of 9/10. Paste ranked it 46th on its list of the best anime films and praised its surrealism and experimentalism, while the Japanese film magazine Cut ranked it third on its own list. Writer Patrick Macias included it among his ten best films, describing it as the most important anime film of the 1990s, while Slant Magazine ranked it the 42nd-best science-fiction film. Anime News Network's Nick Creamer called it the best ending in Japanese animation and described the scene in which Shinji strangles Asuka as one of the most cathartic images in any medium. Real Live described the battle between Asuka and the nine Eva Series units as a scene that "probably left a mark on the history of Japanese animation", while Comic Book Resources called it "the beating heart of the film". Anime News Network's Mike Crandol similarly regarded it as the best battle in the series. Digitally Obsessed described The End of Evangelion as "one of the most unique Japanese animated features since Akira".

In a poll of animators and directors conducted by Time Out New York, The End of Evangelion ranked as the 65th-best animated film. The Daily Telegraph reviewer Robbie Collin ranked it the 29th-greatest animated film of all time. Critics generally responded positively to the film's violence and underlying pessimism. Reviewers also praised its action sequences, animation, soundtrack, themes, and direction. Animage magazine praised the film's apocalyptic vision, describing it as "a beautiful nightmarish spectacle [that] overwhelms the viewer". Little White Lies's Kambole Campbell praised the animation, the apocalyptic themes, and Anno's use of animatics, hand-drawn sketches, and live-action footage to break the fourth wall. Vice's Gita Jackson and Mania.com reviewers called the film a "masterpiece". Tiffani Nadeau of Mania.com also praised Sagisu's soundtrack.

Other reviewers criticized the confusing narrative and philosophical musings. Gizmodo's Rob Bricken criticized its nihilism and pessimism. THEM Anime Reviews's Carlos Ross argued that the film's second half "is so incoherent and obtuse that it completely loses the mainstream audience (and in fact, virtually any audience) this series has attracted before". Ross further argued that The End of Evangelion "goes beyond art film ... and beyond anime. And in doing so, it goes beyond the audience's capability to understand and be entertained, which defeats the purpose of something labeled as entertainment." Matthew Wise of The Anime Café criticized the film's character development and extensive philosophical references and preferred the television series finale. According to Anime-Planet, The End of Evangelion "falls apart under its own philosophical weight"; the reviewer criticized its "pompous symbolism", calling it "pretentious and disappointing", and concluded that it was among the worst anime they had seen. ScreenCrush listed The End of Evangelion among the most disorienting films. Newtype USA gave the film a negative review, describing it as a "saga of bamboozlement" and criticizing its "biblical overtones, teen melodrama and bad parenting"; the review prompted protests from Manga Entertainment, The End of Evangelion's North American distributor. Other critics praised the film's cultural references, including Mark Schilling. Writer Brian Camp defended the film's complexity, writing: "Not all great anime is meant to be understood on first viewing ... You don't always have to understand something to enjoy it. A work of great art in a museum or gallery is not always easily understood but one can still be gripped by it." Chris Beveridge of Mania.com similarly praised the film's dense symbolism, writing: "From trash to philosophical enlightenment, action extravaganza to a movie heavy in symbolism. Interpretations will vary greatly, and that to me is a sign of a very good movie." The End of Evangelion was honored at the Awards of the Japanese Academy, the Animation Kobe and the 15th Golden Gloss Awards.

=== Legacy ===
Dazed speculated that The End of Evangelion influenced Wes Anderson's film Isle of Dogs (2018); the magazine also noted Anderson's explicit admiration for the series. The battle between Asuka's Eva-02 and the nine units of the Eva Series influenced animators including Yoshimichi Kameda and Yokota Takumi, character designer of Love Live! Nijigasaki High School Idol Club. The film also influenced Tetsuya Ogawa of L'Arc-en-Ciel, who wrote a song titled "Anata" (あなた; lit. "you") with Asuka in mind, expressing his hope that she could convey her emotions during the film. The band Parkway Drive used clips from the film in their extended play Don't Close Your Eyes.

Manga artist Nobuhiro Watsuki lauded "the dramatization, the movement, and the editing" of the film and stated that, "As a writer, I was able to take home something from it". Critics have noted references to the film in the American animated series Steven Universe, the film One Hour Photo by Mark Romanek, the anime Claymore, Sayonara, Zetsubou-Sensei, Keroro Gunso, Chainsaw Man and the last episode of Devilman Crybaby, an adaptation of Nagai's manga that inspired Anno. GameRant identified a possible reference to the film's Third Impact in Bleach: Thousand-Year Blood War. ComicBook.com likewise identified a possible reference in My Hero Academia. Muscular states that his muscle armor has "twelve thousand layers" in one scene; ComicBook.com linked this statement to Asuka's claim in The End of Evangelion that Eva-02 has "twelve thousand plates of fortified armor". The website further noted that the manga's author, Kohei Horikoshi, is an Evangelion fan. The Chinese animated film One Hundred Thousand Bad Jokes also pays homage to The End of Evangelion during its final sequences, which feature a soundtrack resembling "Komm, süsser Tod". According to IndieWire's David Ehrlich, an apocalyptic scenario similar to that of The End of Evangelion is presented in the video game Death Stranding, written and directed by Hideo Kojima.

== Bibliography ==
- 新世紀エヴァンゲリオン残酷な天使のように (in Japanese). Magazine Magazine. 1997. ISBN 4-906011-25-X.
- Takekuma, Kentaro (1997). Anno Hideaki Parano Evangelion (in Japanese). Ōta Shuppan. ISBN 4-87233-316-0.
- Sanenari, Oizumi (1997). Anno Hideaki Schizo Evangelion (in Japanese). Ōta Shuppan. ISBN 4-87233-315-2.
- Morikawa, Kaichiro (1997). The Evangelion Style (in Japanese). Daisan Shokan. ISBN 4-8074-9718-9.
- Yoshihara, Yuki (1998). ドキュメント『ラブ&ポップ』 (in Japanese). Shogakukan. ISBN 4-09-385108-5.
- Fujie, Kazuhisa; Foster, Martin (2004). Neon Genesis Evangelion: The Unofficial Guide. United States: DH Publishing, Inc. ISBN 0-9745961-4-0.
- Porori, Syunsou (2009). The Essential Evangelion Chronicle: Side A (in French). Glénat Editions. ISBN 978-2-7234-7120-6.
- Porori, Syunsou (2010). The Essential Evangelion Chronicle: Side B (in French). Glénat Editions. ISBN 978-2-7234-7121-3.
- Tavassi, Guido (2012). Storia dell'animazione giapponese: Autori, arte, industria, successo dal 1917 ad oggi (in Italian). Tunué. ISBN 978-88-97165-51-4.
- Ruh, Brian (2013). "Producing Transnational Cult Media- Neon Genesis Evangelion and Ghost in the Shell in Circulation" (PDF). Intensities (5): 10. Archived (PDF) from the original on May 7, 2025.
- Cordella, Claudio (2017). Il sogno di Lalah: Animanga e utopismi (in Italian). Delos Digital. ISBN 978-88-254-0420-3.
- Stojnic, Betty (2021). "Boy With Machine: A Deleuzo-Guattarian Critique of Neon Genesis Evangelion". Journal of Anime and Manga Studies. 2. Archived from the original on April 22, 2026.
- Seager, River (2023). "Newtypes, Angels, and Human Instrumentality: The Mecha Genre and its Apocalyptic Bodies". The Journal of Anime and Manga Studies. 4. doi:10.21900/j.jams.v4.1186. hdl:2142/121875. ISSN 2689-2596. LCCN 2019202004. OCLC 1122856409. S2CID 265870333.
- McDowell, Gavin (2026). "Canon and Apocrypha in Neon Genesis Evangelion". Journal of Religion and Popular Culture. University of California Press.
