= Street Fighter Alpha: Generations =

- Directed by: Ikuo Kuwana
- Produced by: Kaoru Mfaume; Kazufumi Nomura
- Starring: Yasuyuki Kase; Yuri Amano; Eiji Hanawa; Mao Kawasaki; Daisuke Gōri; Kinryū Arimoto; Tadashi Saito; Takeshi Aono; Yasunori Matsumoto; Ken'yū Horiuchi
- Music by: Bill Laswell
- Production company: A.P.P.P.
- Distributed by: Manga Entertainment
- Release date: 25 October 2005
- Running time: 45 minutes
- Country: Japan
- Language: Japanese

Street Fighter Alpha: Generations is a 2005 Japanese anime film produced by A.P.P.P. and released by Manga Entertainment based on the 1996 video game Street Fighter Alpha 2 by Capcom. The film was produced specifically for the English-language market and was not officially released in Japan until its inclusion as a bonus feature in the Japanese DVD and Blu-ray release of the live-action film Street Fighter: The Legend of Chun-Li (2009).

== Plot ==
Gouki (Akuma) is battling his master Goutetsu. Though they are evenly matched, Gouki emerges victorious and kills Goutetsu using the Raging Demon technique.

Gouken arrives to find Goutetsu's mangled body and Gouki, who now looks inhuman. Gouken scorns Gouki, telling him that his path was set for him and asking why he would do such a thing. Gouki takes his master's beaded necklace before leaving. Sayaka falls down to her knees and vomits, a sign of her pregnancy and her connection to Gouki.

In the present day, Ryu is visiting his master's old dojo when an apparition of Gouki appears and challenges him. After Ryu comes to his senses, he is greeted by an old man who says that he witnessed what was a true demon. The old man invites Ryu to his house, where Ryu meets his granddaughter Fuka and offers to train him. Sakura appears and spars with him, which encourages Ryu to accept Gouki's challenge.

Ryu seeks out Gouki, and the fight begins. During the battle, Ken confronts the old man, but is easily defeated. It is here that the old man tells Ken about the Satsui no Hadou, a mysterious and evil life force that dwells within certain fighters. As this life force is exploited, it grows stronger until it consumes them. He also states that the Satsui no Hadou is so ancient that even warlords knew of its existence.

As Ryu and Gouki fight, Ryu becomes desperate and is temporarily possessed by the Satsui no Hadou. However, he realizes that it is not the correct course of action and stops using the power. Gouki scolds Ryu, stating that his path to becoming great warrior had been clouded and that a true warrior unleashes his full potential. Seeing Ryu as not a threat to him anymore, Gouki attacks him using the Metsu Hadouken, but Ryu survives. Gouki then walks away, cursing Gouken and saying that one day, he and Ryu will meet again to fight. Gouki sees an apparition of Sayaka treating his wounds in the past before the scene shifts back to the present, with Gouki now having a more human appearance, implying that he has regained some of his humanity.

Meanwhile, the old man looks to the sky and addresses his old friend, Gouken. He states that Gouken asked him to take care of a young child, who was left in his care after Sayaka died in childbirth and was told not to let them take the path that Gouki had chosen, and that he regrets failing to prevent this. He states that he is too old, and that his time has come; Fuka is later seen praying in tears. Ryu takes one last look at her before leaving soon after to begin his travels anew.

== Cast ==
Character	Japanese VA	English VA
Ryu	Yasuyuki Kase	Richard Cansino
Old Master	Takeshi Aono	Simon Prescott
Akuma	Daisuke Gōri, Yasunori Matsumoto (young)	Keith Burgess
Fuka	Yuri Amano	Susan Marque
Sakura Kasugano	Mao Kawasaki	Michelle Ruff
Gouken	Tadashi Saito, Ken'yū Horiuchi (young)	Dave Mallow
Sayaka	Yuri Amano	Stephanie Sheh
Goutetsu	Kinryū Arimoto	Michael McConnohie
Ken Masters	Eiji Hanawa	Steve Cassling

== Reception ==
Street Fighter Alpha: Generations was not as successful as its predecessor, earning a 52% "rotten" score on Rotten Tomatoes.
