= Keith Burgess =

American voice actor

Keith Burgess is an American voice actor. He voiced Akuma in Street Fighter Alpha: The Animation and Street Fighter Alpha: Generations. He also loaned his voice in the two anime movies Evangelion: Death and Rebirth, The End of Evangelion and Karas: The Prophecy. He was a staff member for Manga Entertainment Inc. He has played Street Fighter IV, when he appeared at FanimeCon 2009, challenging Reuben Langdon at the game.

== Roles ==
Year	Title	Role	Notes
2006	Karas: The Prophecy	Suiko	
2004	Ikki Tousen	Gang Member	
2001	Street Fighter Alpha: The Movie	Akuma	
2005	Street Fighter Alpha: Generations	Akuma	
2004	Dead Leaves	Chinko Drill	
2002	Neon Genesis Evangelion: Death & Rebirth	Makoto Hyuga	
2002	The End of Evangelion	Makoto Hyuga	

== As staff member ==
- Death & Rebirth
- The End of Evangelion
- Noein
- Rayearth
- Read or Die (OVA)
- Tokko (manga)
