= Street Fighter Alpha: The Animation =

- DVD cover
- Directed by: Shigeyasu Yamauchi
- Written by: Reiko Yoshida
- Produced by: Kaoru Mfaume
- Starring: Kane Kosugi; Kazuya Ichijō; Reiko Kiuchi; Daiki Nakamura; Hisao Egawa; Yumi Toma; Chiaki Osawa; Ai Orikasa; Tomomichi Nishimura; Miki Nagasawa; Bin Shimada
- Music by: Hayato Matsuo
- Production company: Group TAC
- Release date: August 31, 2000
- Running time: 93 minutes
- Country: Japan
- Language: Japanese

Street Fighter Alpha: The Animation, released in Japan as Street Fighter Zero (ストリートファイターZERO, Sutorīto Faitā Zero), and also known as Street Fighter Zero: The Movie, is a 2000 OVA based on the fighting game Street Fighter Alpha 2 by Capcom, directed by Shigeyasu Yamauchi. An English dub version was later produced by Manga Entertainment and released in 2001 on the 10th anniversary of the video game Street Fighter II: The World Warrior.

The film is not a prequel or sequel to either the film Street Fighter II: The Animated Movie (1994) or the series Street Fighter II V (1995), but an independent installment, although several voice actors from previous adaptations reprised their roles for the English version of the movie.

== Plot ==
Ryu is contemplating the death of his sensei, Gouken, and struggling with the "Dark Hadou", an evil energy which Gouken's brother, Akuma, succumbed to. While in the city, Ryu fights off agents of Shadaloo, gaining the attention of Interpol agent Chun-Li and aspiring martial artist Sakura, who becomes his fan and vows to track him down and become his student.

In Japan, a mysterious fortune-teller, Rose, confronts Ryu and questions him about his hold over the Dark Hadou and reason for fighting. While visiting Gouken's grave, Ryu meets his old friend, Ken Masters, and they are approached by Shun, a young boy who claims he is Ryu's long-lost brother. According to Shun, their mother raised him in Brazil and sent him to find Ryu before she died. Ken is skeptical, but Ryu takes Shun in and notices his potential as a fighter. One night, Ryu succumbs to the Dark Hadou and nearly kills Ken. He instructs Ken to kill him if he is ever completely possessed by the Dark Hadou, which Ken agrees to.

Ken and Shun enter an underground fighting tournament; while on the way there, they are harassed by street thugs. Ryu and Shun fight them off, but Ryu notices a sadistic streak in Shun, whom he has to punch to stop from killing one of the thugs. Meanwhile, Ken finds Sakura in a local bar and agrees to take her to Ryu, but is too late to enter the tournament as Ryu is found by Chun-Li. In the tournament, which is watched over by its enigmatic organizer, Dr. Sadler, Shun is pitted against wrestler Zangief. Shun pummels Zangief with his superior speed, but the Dark Hadou catches up with him, distracting him long enough for Zangief to attack him. Ryu steps in and fights Zangief, but is also overcome by the Dark Hadou and fires a Dark Hadouken which misses Zangief and causes the building to collapse. As Ken takes an injured Sakura to safety, Ryu is confronted by Rosanov, a biomechanical android, and Shun is injured defending him. Enraged, Ryu obliterates Rosanov with another Dark Hadouken. While Ryu is distracted, Shun is abducted by Shadaloo agents.

As Ryu loses the will to fight, Rose appears before him and encourages him to save Shun. Accompanied by Chun-Li, Ryu first visits Akuma at his remote home in the mountains. Akuma, believing that Ryu has come to challenge him, attempts to goad him into succumbing to the Dark Hadou. Ryu refuses, and Akuma orders him to leave. Ryu asks Akuma if he is Shun's father or has any family, which he denies. Ryu then travels to Sadler's hideout to rescue Shun, accompanied by Ken, Chun-Li, Guy, Dan, Dhalsim, Birdie, Adon, Rolento and Sodom.

As the other fighters battle outside Sadler's lab, Ryu, Ken and Chun-Li sneak inside to find Shun and are confronted by another Rosanov, who has been upgraded to a fighting machine. Ryu arrives and realizes that Rosanov is actually an android with Shun inside, who is working for Sadler. Shun goads Ryu into using a Dark Hadouken, since he is connected to Sadler and attacking him will increase Sadler's fighting potential through absorption. The Dark Hadouken frees Shun and destroys Rosanov. With this sudden increase in power, Sadler bursts out of his lab and attacks Ryu. Rose intervenes, informing Ryu in a vision that "you haven't drawn the death card yet". Inspired, Ryu fires a normal Shinku Hadouken directly into Sadler, who crumbles into dust.

As Shun succumbs to his injuries, he reveals that he lied to Ryu about being his brother and worked with Sadler to raise money for his mother, who had died. Ryu tells Shun that he is still his brother and vows never to use the Dark Hadou again as the fighters return to their everyday lives.

== Cast ==
Main

Character	Japanese voice actor	English dubbing actor
Ryu	Kane Kosugi	Skip Stellrecht
Ken	Kazuya Ichijō	Steve Blum
Shun	Reiko Kiuchi	Mona Marshall
Chun-Li	Yumi Toma	Lia Sargent
Dr. Sadler	Daiki Nakamura	Peter Lurie
Rosanov/Sadlerbot	Hisao Egawa	Tom Wyner
Akuma	Tomomichi Nishimura	Keith Burgess

Secondary

Character	Japanese voice actor	English dubbing actor
Sakura	Chiaki Osawa	Michelle Ruff
Rose	Ai Orikasa	Carolyn Hennesy
Zangief	Hidenari Ugaki	Joe Romersa
Adon	Wataru Takagi	R. Martin Klein
Vega	Kazuyuki Ishikawa	Richard Cansino
Birdie	Ryûzaburô Ôtomo	Michael McCarty
Dan	Kazuyuki Ishikawa	Bob Papenbrook
Kei	Miki Nagasawa	Sherry Lynn
Sodom	Masao Fuda	R. Martin Klein
Wallace	Bin Shimada	
Rose	Ai Orikasa	Kim Mai Guest

== Reception ==
Anime News Network criticized the open ending of Street Fighter Alpha but praised its plot, detailed animation, music, and the quality of both the Japanese and English voice acting. They gave it an A−.
