= Hedgehog's Dilemma (Neon Genesis Evangelion) =

- Neon Genesis Evangelion episode
- The freeze frame of Misato Katsuragi and Shinji Ikari at the end of the episode, which was praised by Forbes Lauren Orsini
- Episode no.: Episode 4
- Directed by: Tsuyoshi Kaga
- Written by: Akio Satsukawa
- Original air date: October 25, 1995
- Running time: 22 minutes

Episode chronology
← Previous "A Transfer"	Next → "Rei I"

"Hedgehog's Dilemma", also known by the Japanese title "Rain, After Running Away", (Note: Japanese: 雨、逃げ出した後, Hepburn: Ame, Nigedashita Ato) is the fourth episode of the anime Neon Genesis Evangelion, which was created by animation studio Gainax. The episode, written by Akio Satsukawa and directed by Tsuyoshi Kaga, was first broadcast on TV Tokyo on October 25, 1995. The series is set fifteen years after a worldwide cataclysm named Second Impact, and is mostly set in the futuristic, fortified city of Tokyo-3. The episode's protagonist is Shinji Ikari, a teenage boy who is recruited by his father Gendo to the organization Nerv to pilot a giant biomechanical mecha named Evangelion into combat with beings called Angels. In the episode, Shinji is overcome by the stress of being an Evangelion pilot and runs away from home. After wandering around Tokyo-3, he must choose between quitting and staying at Nerv.

Production of "Hedgehog's Dilemma" took place after the fifth and sixth episodes were made, and the content varied from the staff's original ideas. It is the only episode in which Neon Genesis Evangelion director Hideaki Anno is not credited with direction or screenplay. The episode's title references the namesake concept proposed by German philosopher Arthur Schopenhauer, variously called the "hedgehog's" or the "porcupine's dilemma". The episode scored a 5.8% rating of audience share on Japanese TV and was generally well-received by critics. The episode received appreciation for focusing on the psychological description of the characters. Critics also appreciated the philosophical themes and directorial choices of "Hedgehog's Dilemma", such as the representation of natural landscapes and the use of still images.

== Plot ==
Special agency Nerv Major Misato Katsuragi notices Shinji Ikari, a minor in her custody and official Evangelion pilot, has run away from home. Shinji aimlessly wanders around the city of Tokyo-3 and the countryside, and meets his classmate Kensuke Aida sleeping in a tent. In the morning, men in black escort Shinji back to Nerv headquarters, where he renounces the title of pilot and chooses to return to ordinary life. Shinji is taken to a station to board a special government train, and meets Kensuke and Toji Suzuhara, another of Shinji's classmates, who had struck him in the previous episode. Toji reconciles with Shinji under Kensuke's push, asking Shinji to strike him without holding back, which he reluctantly does. Misato drives to the station, believing Shinji has already left. She notices Shinji, who has decided not to board the train, on the platform, and they smile at each other.

== Production ==
[Shinji] tries to live in a closed world where his behavior dooms him. ... He has convinced himself that he is a completely unnecessary person, so much so that he cannot even commit suicide. And there is a 29-year-old woman [Misato] who lives life so lightly as to barely allow the possibility of a human touch. She protects herself by having surface-level relationships, and running away. Both are extremely afraid of being hurt. Both are unsuitable — lacking the positive attitude — for what people call heroes of an adventure. But in any case, they are the heroes of this story.

— Hideaki Anno, July 17, 1995

"Hedgehog's Dilemma" was once omitted in terms of the series composition, and it was planned that the fifth episode, "Rei I", would come after the third, "A Transfer". After the battle against Angel Shamshel, Shinji would become friends with Toji Suzuhara and Kensuke Aida in "A Transfer", receiving a call from them. As production progressed, however, staff members said they thought there was a need to depict Shinji's relationships with the people around him after the third episode. As they were writing the scripts and the screenplay, the staff also felt that it would be logically implausible to have Shinji pilot Eva-01 again without first considering the effects of the boy's traumatic experience. "Hedgehog's Dilemma" was thus made with contents that differ from the original plans. Moreover, Neon Genesis Evangelion director Hideaki Anno had already worked on the fifth and sixth episodes of the series, and tried to go beyond regular anime and develop realistic characters with the installments.

The episode's script was written after the fifth episode's script had already been finalized, making "Hedgehog's Dilemma" the only episode in which director Anno did not have direct input into the plot and script. Akio Satsukawa wrote the episode, while Jun'ichi Satō, who is credited as Kiichi Jinme, drew the storyboard. Tsuyoshi Kaga directed the episode, and Satoshi Shigeta served as chief animator. British singer Claire Littley also sang a cover of "Fly Me to the Moon" which was later used as the episode's closing theme song, replaced in late home video editions by another cover by Yōko Takahashi. In 1993, Gainax wrote a presentation volume of Neon Genesis Evangelion named New Century Evangelion (tentative name) Proposal (新世紀エヴァンゲリオン (仮) 企画書, Shinseiki Evangelion (kari) kikakusho), containing a first draft of the planned episodes. The studio published the Proposal document in 1994. In the original project, the fourth episode should have been titled "14 years, the first day" (14歳、 始まりの日, 14-sai, hajimari no hi); during the episode, Shinji's birthday would occur, but his father Gendo would have ignored the son without wishing him a happy birthday. Rei Ayanami would then attempt to make dinner for both of them, while Misato would decide something for Shinji. Gainax also proposed "The Wandering Third Children" (さまよえるサード・チルドレン, Samayoeru Sādo Chirudoren) as the episode's title in the storyboard phase.

During production, the staff thought about opening and closing the episode with Misato reading the day's notes from her diary, but the idea was dropped and used for the movie Neon Genesis Evangelion: Death and Rebirth (1997). The draft script for "Hedgehog's Dilemma" also mentions dates that were cut from the broadcast, according to which the episode's final scene, in which Misato recounts the events of the previous week, was originally intended to take place on July 31, 2015. In the episode's original script draft, Gainax planned for Misato to grab Shinji by the collar during their conversation. She would then ask Toji and Kensuke whether anything had happened at school, and Shinji would see the sea during his flight from Tokyo-3. The days were described as cold rather than summery as in the final version, and Kensuke's military role-playing scene was considerably longer. While speaking with Shinji, Misato would apologize for forcing him to do things against his will. Satsukawa himself stated that he initially envisioned Misato as a more militaristic character. Ritsuko, rather than Nerv's men, would accompany Shinji to the station and relay a message from Gendo: "Take care of yourself". At the station, Shinji would apologize to Toji and Kensuke for hesitating to let them board Eva-01 in the previous episode. The final exchange between Misato and Shinji and any explicit mention of the hedgehog's dilemma were not yet included. Ritsuko, meanwhile, would mention Pandora's box in connection with the Second Impact. After a flashback depicting Misato and Shinji's first meeting and the beginning of their life together, the final scene would show Shinji at Nerv undergoing tests with a Z-Cycle laser cannon.

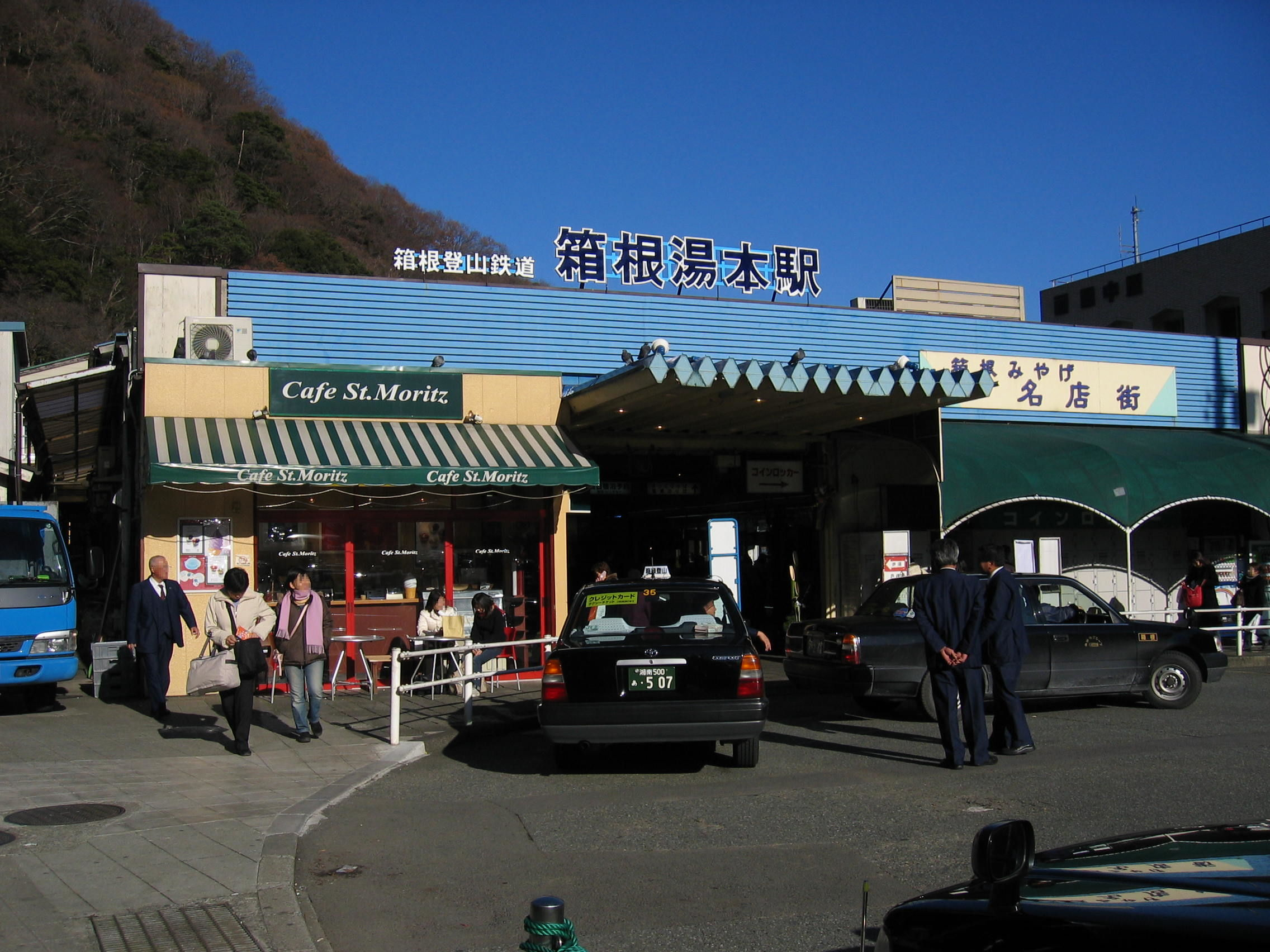
For the New Hakone Yumoto station, staff took inspiration from the real Hakone-Yumoto Station

In the scene in which Shinji watches the disaster film about the Second Impact in a cinema, a "story within a story" script was created and voice-acted for realism, including all of the film's main characters, who were voiced by Kōichi Nagano, Hiro Yūki, Megumi Hayashibara, Fumihiko Tachiki as the doctor, Tetsuya Iwanaga and Tomokazu Seki as his assistants. A frame in which Rei is analyzed in a computerized scanning was added in the following scenes, in which normal cells have been integrated with computer-generated effects. The Tokyo-3 signs in the night scene were also produced by the staff on the computer, and were later incorporated into the final drawings. Italian writer Mario Pasqualini noted how the scene features, among others, a karaoke sign, whose sign, however, reads karawoke (カラヲケ), where the kana character オ (o) is replaced with ヲ (wo). Pasqualini linked this to a specific choice of Anno already used in Gunbuster and to the gyaru-moji writing style, which has spread among Japanese youth during Evangelion broadcast using arbitrary homophones or graphic inventions. Writer Virginie Nebbia noticed that Misato, usually depicted in a sensual manner, wears long pajamas that cover her entire body in "Hedgehog's Dilemma". According to Nebbia, this is due to the absence of Anno from the main staff. However, Nebbia noted how Anno's imprint is still present, as it features elements typical of his direction, such as close-ups of electricity poles and the long, silent final shot. Writer Álvaro Arbonés similarly noted the episode presents a dreamlike and visual style very different from the previous one; for example, Shinji is portrayed wandering in a field similar to Vincent Van Gogh's paintings.

During the episode, existing geographical places such as Atsugi, Gōra, Togendai, the Ōwakudani valley, a pampas grass field in Sengokuhara, and Lake Ashi, are named or drawn. A fictional JRG train model named Odakyū 7700 series CHiSE was also drawn for the episode. Hayashibara and Hiro Yūki served as female and male speakers of the train, respectively. Hayashibara and Yūko Miyamura also voiced two prostitutes in a scene in which Shinji wanders Tokyo-3 at night. For the last scene, which is set in the New Hakone Yumoto station, staff took inspiration from the real Hakone-Yumoto Station, depicting it similarly to the actual station. The stairs into which Shinji is led by the men in black were depicted as dark, similar to the corridors of a prison. Another Okadyū Romancecar train similar to the Odakyū 10000 series HiSE was drawn for the scene, along with a Renault Alpine A310 car without modifications driven by Misato. In the same sequence, the songs Bay Side Love Story – from Tokyo and Face from Masami Okui's album Gyuu (1995) were used as background music. A fifty-second-long take in which Shinji and Misato look at each other in the station was added as a conclusion to the episode. Academic writer Giuseppe Gatti noted that the use of long shots that "transmit its atmosphere of cognitive and narrative thinning" became one of the defining stylistic elements of Evangelion. The take was originally supposed to be one minute long, but the staff decided to cut it during production. Academic Philip Brophy noted that Shinji is positioned in a wide frame, visually reducing him in size, focus, and importance; the scene has no music, with just the station announcements and Okui's song "at the threshold of audibility", so "at these moments, location sound is either reduced or voided". Brophy described it as a musical haiku, where the "individual elements collide, merge, and quietly combust". Writer River Seager noted Anno had shown an interest in trains since his short film At the Bus Stop (1980) and Mobile Suit Gundam: Char's Counterattack (1988); the symbol of the train then returns in Anno's next work, Love & Pop (1998). Seager observed that trains have fused the themes of death and modernity since Kenji Miyazawa's novel Night on the Galactic Railroad, which was adapted into an anime film by Gisaburō Sugii and possibly influenced Galaxy Express 999. Trains became a site of isolation, loneliness, and the desire to run away; however, in Anno's cinematography, train stations also offer the hope for growth and change, as in the final scene of "Hedgehog's Dilemma".

== Cultural references ==
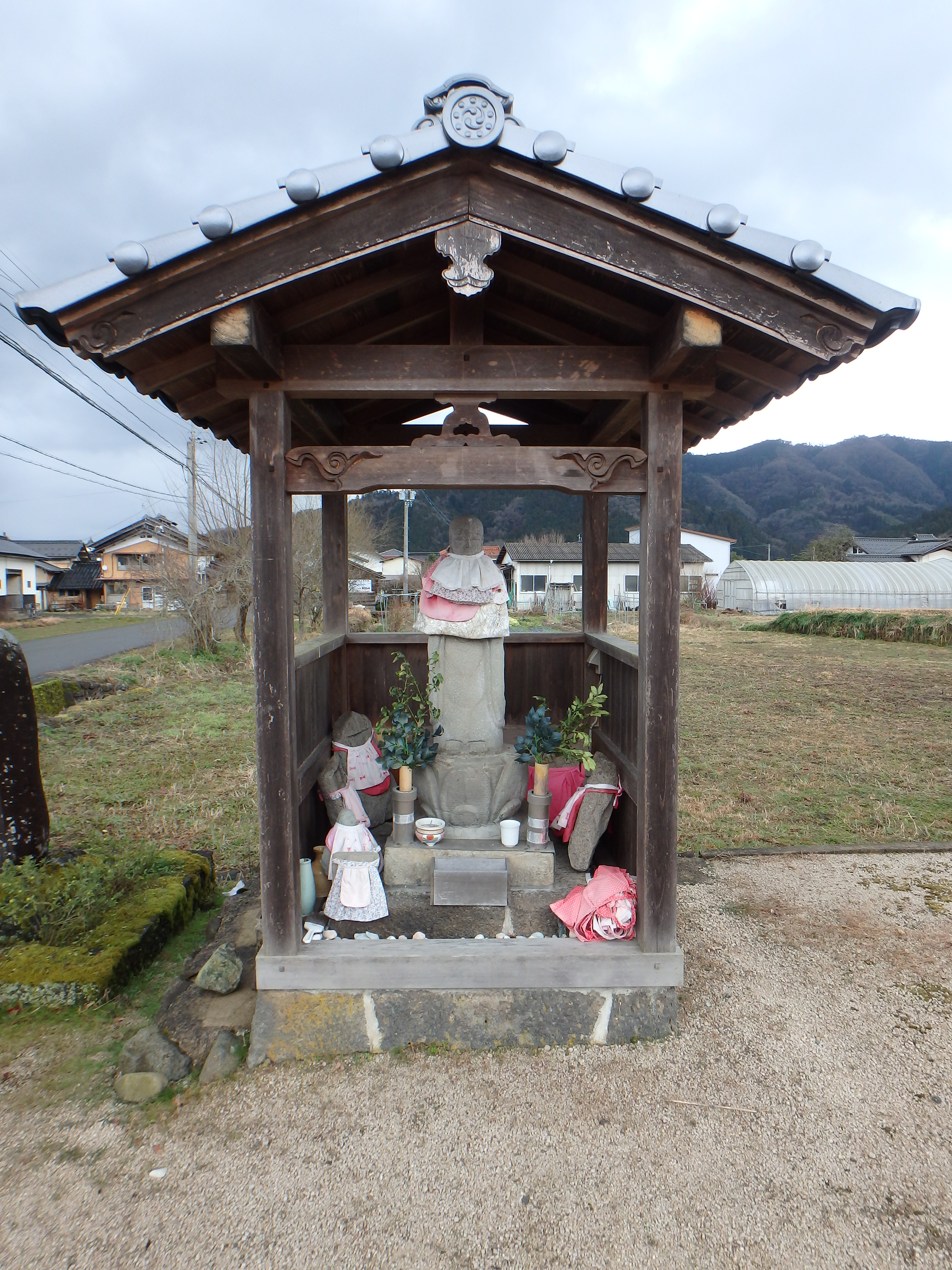
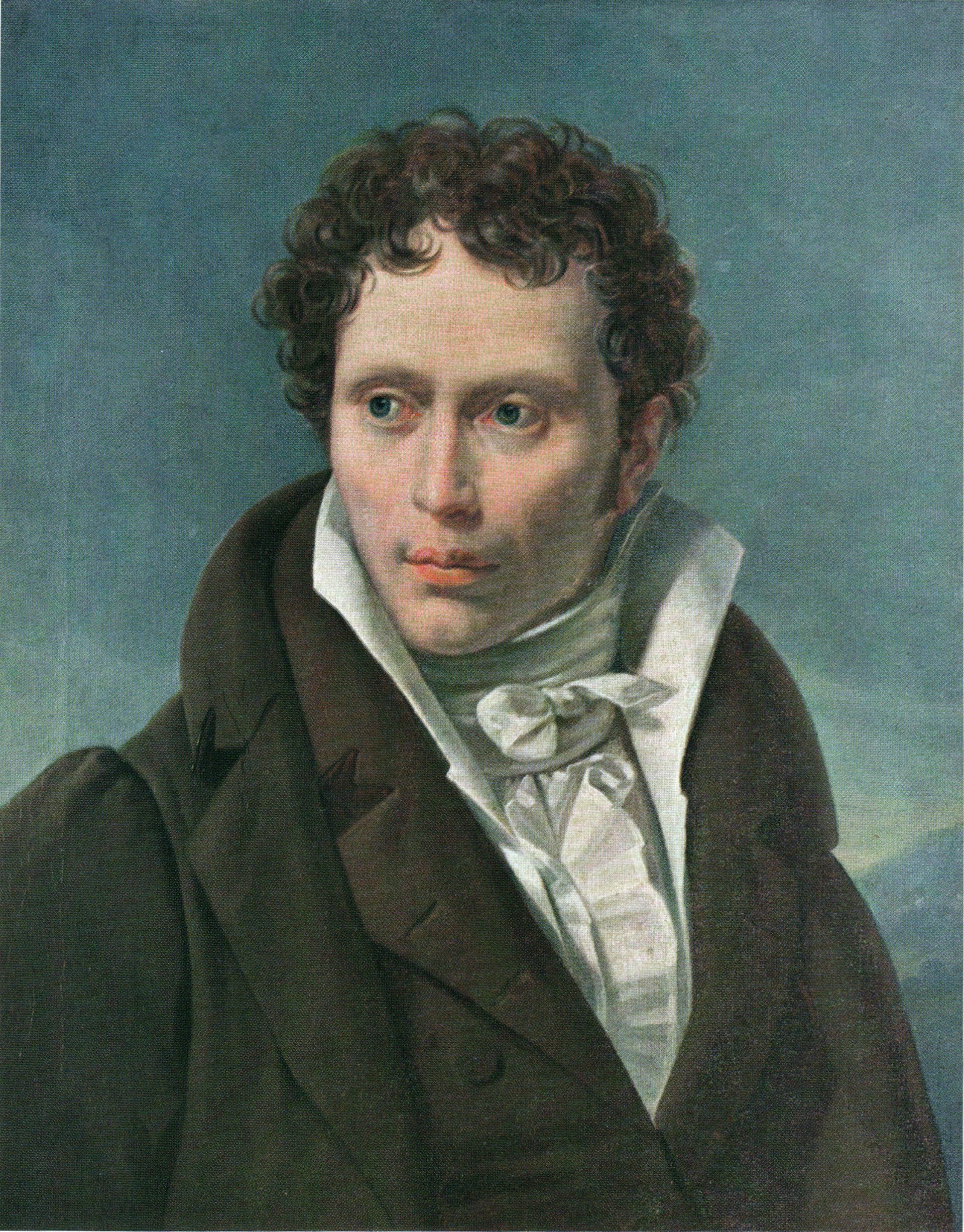
The title "Hedgehog's Dilemma" refers to a concept by philosopher Arthur Schopenhauer. Critics have also noted how the statue of a Jizō appears throughout the episode.

The episode's English title, "Hedgehog's Dilemma", references the psychoanalytic and philosophical concept of the porcupine's dilemma, mentioned for the first time in the previous episode. The concept, suggested by Satsukawa during the script writing, is usually used to describe the behaviors of individuals with a borderline personality disorder. Like the porcupines of Arthur Schopenhauer's Parerga and Paralipomena, Shinji is afraid to be hurt and withdraws from human contact. As noted by writer Hans-Georg Eilenberger, the Third Child has a hard time opening up to others and, as a result, is constantly wavering between emotional investment and withdrawal. According to scholar Sano Yasuyuki, Shinji is afraid to communicate with others, but he cannot cease desiring to touch others, as he still wants to be recognized by his father and has sexual interests in the female body. According to Schopenhauer's pessimistic philosophy, every human relationship is characterized by pain and miscommunication; the closer humans are, the easier it is to hurt each other. As noted by writer Virginie Nebbia, all the main Evangelion characters hide their inner self for fear of being hurt, as in Schopenhauer's dilemma. Animage magazine argued that the relationships between Gendo and Ritsuko, Shinji and Asuka, and Misato and Kaji all follow this scheme; a secret society named Seele also physically hurts and attacks Nerv in the movie The End of Evangelion (1997).

Shinji's relationship with Misato Katsuragi follows Schopenhauer's concept, since they both hurt but look for each other. Misato is also a victim of the dilemma. She eventually realizes Shinji's loneliness and communication difficulties in the episode before his departure. Gualtiero Cannarsi, who curated the Italian adaptation of the series, noticed Misato and Shinji get closer without hurting each other in the train station scene, overcoming Schopenhauer's dilemma. According to Animerica magazine, Shinji eventually ends up "finding a little compassion in an unlikely place" at the end of the episode, and this is enough to change his mind. Schopenhauer originally named his concept after the porcupine, or hystricidae (Stachelschweine in German); Neon Genesis Evangelion staff chose an alternative translation, since they wanted to portray Shinji as a hedgehog, an animal with smaller, blunter spines than those of a porcupine, suggesting more delicacy for the character. For writer Alexandre Marine, a similar concept can be found in Royal Space Force: The Wings of Honnêamise (1987) and The Secret of Blue Water, in which Nadia Arwol realizes she can't live without interacting with other people after a suicide attempt. It is revealed in the second half of the series that Seele tries to merge all humanity into a single being, deleting human psychological barriers in a process named Human Instrumentality. For scholar River Seager, Evangelion Instrumentality can be regarded as a possible solution to Arthur Schopenhauer's dilemma. For scholar Khegan M. DelPort, the series' moral seems to be that "we have to live with other people". For writer Gionathan C. Pacheco, Neon Genesis Evangelion can thus be described as a "manifesto against individualistic escapism".

Shinji's temporary resignation from Nerv is a tribute to the television series The Prisoner. Italian scholar Claudio Cordella also compared Shinji's resignation with Amuro Ray from Mobile Suit Gundam. Psychology Today writer Walter Veit linked Shinji's behavior to Jean-Paul Sartre's existentialist concept of bad faith and Albert Camus's "philosophical suicide" for his passivity and his submissive attitude. Yahata Shoten's Evangelion Glossary (エヴァンゲリオン用語事典, Evangerion Yougo Jiten) noted that human beings usually engage in two types of escape: passive escape, which consists of trying to solve problems by distancing themselves from loved ones, and active escape, in which one abandons them to achieve one's own goals. Shinji's escape falls into the first type. Jun'ichi Satō compared the third and the fourth episode of Evangelion to Mobile Suit Victory Gundam, while critic Mario Pasqualini likened the scene in which Shinji stops near a Jizō statue to a similar sequence in the film My Neighbor Totoro (1988). According to academic Susan J. Napier , the scene shows how Evangelion has some "nostalgic aspects" for the premodern pastoral world. Napier also described the pastoral scene as an example of the "elegiac mode" in anime, one of the major thematic models in Japanese animation, a register characterized by melancholy and contemplation which can be found in Ghost in the Shell (1995), Whisper of the Heart (1995), or Grave of the Fireflies (1988). Kensuke also plays a survivor game alone in the sequence; Cannarsi thus compared him to a military fan who appears in Otaku no Video (1991), a previous work by Gainax. In the cinema scene, Shinji sees a movie named World Sinks (世界沈没, Sekai Chinbotsu), a parody of Submersion of Japan. Anime Feminist writers noted Shinji is framed with blank eyes while watching the movie, linking this to depression and Hideaki Anno's difficult emotional state during the Evangelion production. Multiversity Comics' Matthew Garcia similarly traced an influence on the episodes "A Transfer" and "Hedgehog's Dilemma" to Hideaki Anno's personal experience, particularly the production of his previous work, Nadia; according to him, like Anno on Nadia, Shinji is thrown into a situation he doesn't understand "or have much investment in".

== Themes ==
The main theme of "A Transfer" and "Hedgehog's Dilemma" is interpersonal communication. No battle against an Angel is presented in the episode, which is entirely focused on the psychology of the characters instead. During the episode, Shinji deals with his fear of hurt and rejection by running away. He feels he is the only one to suffer and that he is hated by everyone. Cannarsi and Yūichirō Oguro, the editor of supplemental materials included in the Japanese edition of the series, noticed that every Neon Genesis Evangelion character has communication difficulties, except for Kensuke, who shows great communication skills in the episode. Kensuke takes advantage of his dialectical skills with his classmates Toji and Shinji in "Hedgehog's Dilemma", but they described his communicative ability as a defense mechanism that could mask loneliness and inner fragility. In "A Transfer", Kensuke is the one who pressures Toji and guilt-trips him repeatedly by telling him that beiting Shinji might have demotivated him; he also pretends to not remember Shinji in the final scene to make Toji show his concern for Shinji without his usual pride. In "Hedgehog's Dilemma" Kensuke also manages to get emotionally close to Shinji by revealing that he is an orphan like him. This makes Shinji realize that he is not the only one to suffer. Writer Álvaro Arbonés thus described Kensuke as the "first person to open a breach in Shinji's impenetrable anguish". According to Cannarsi, Kensuke is actually the extrovert in the couple, while Toji shows a shy and introverted attitude instead. As noted by writer Hans-Georg Eilenberger, Kensuke and Shinji show two opposing childlike attitudes; Shinji dreads fights and violence, while Kensuke is obsessed with the military. Shinji also sees a panorama of Tokyo-3 during his escape; for Eileneberg, the vision reflects "Shinji's childlike experience", in contrast to the cold, technological vision of adults around him.

Shinji listening to music with his Digital Audio Tape in the train scene. Critics compared his attitude to otaku or hikikomori people

Shinji must find the fine line between duty and personal desire in the episode. He tries to explain himself to Misato, but to his surprise she relents and relieves him of all responsibility. Shinji then flees from Nerv and listens to music with his Sony Digital Audio Tape in a train, constantly repeating tracks 25 and 26; Carl Gustav Horn, editor of the English edition of the Neon Genesis Evangelion manga, linked the tracks to the last two episodes of Evangelion, which close the series in an interrogative style. For writer Philip Brophy, Shinji listens to his DAT "as if to soothe his own debilitating PTSD state". According to writer Claudio Cordella, since Shinji "is living an unsustainable situation for him, he has a rejection reaction with hallucinatory states". In an interview with Gainax member Yasuhiro Takeda, Anno also argued that Shinji's refusal reflects a normal reaction to the situation, while everyone else—including his father—belongs to "a group of madmen". In the following scenes, Shinji is overcome by a panic attack; everything turns red with the sounds of cicadas, orchestral murmur, and reverberant sirens. According to Philip Brophy, "this is the noise of the world he is actively suppressing: the presence of others, the closeness of friends, the touch of Rei". Brophy also noted that Shinji's voice is noticeably different in the episode, with a calmer, higher-pitched, breathy sound, echoing Rei Ayanami. During Shinji's escape, Misato and Ritsuko argue about Evangelion's pilots. According to writer Zachary Veber, they "make the utilitarian decision that it's worth burdening fourteen-year-olds with irreversible psychological trauma to save humanity", as they pragmatically decide that the end justifies the means.

In the scene at the New Yamoto station, Toji demands Shinji to punch him back to make them even; academic Cristopher Smith described this as a "stereotypical manly exchange of violence expected to lead to homosocial bonding, at least in anime tropes". Shinji reluctantly agrees and punches Suzuhara, thereby momentarily performing violent hegemonic masculinity, but he cannot sustain this performance; he then returns to Suzuhara proclaiming that he is the one who should be hit because he is "cowardly, timid, sneaky, weak". According to Smith, these four words are a "catalogue of his failures to perform hegemonic masculinity: cowardly and timid rather than courageous and confident, sneaky and weak instead of straightforward and strong". Seeing Toji apologize, Shinji realizes he himself is a "coward". He also understands the pain of others and realizes his weakness; for Animage magazine, "that must have been the first time Shinji truly shared his feelings with a friend and connected with them on a deeper level". Anime Feminist writers agreed that Shinji doesn't look comfortable in performing toxic masculinity and express his feeling punching Toji; in the end, Shinji still makes a decision to reach out on his own because he wants to get to know Misato better and to try with his new "family". Animedia media similarly argued that Shinji and Misato finally become a family in the scene, and Shinji gradually change his personality after this. Furthermore, according to director Anno, when Shinji says "I'm back" at the New Hakone Yumoto station, the first stage of his growth journey ends. For Zachary Vereb, instead of leaving on the train, Shinji realizes his obligation to protect those around him in the finale; combining this sense of uncoerced belonging with moral duty, Shinji expresses his autonomous decision saying "I'm back" in the ending scene. Arbonés wrote, "if until now he had to fear that no one would ever love him, now he must also fear that the people who love him will abandon him".

For writer Sano Yasuyuki, another Neon Genesis Evangelion theme found in "Hedgehog's Dilemma" is refusal, as he refuses to pilot Eva-01 in the episode. According to Arbonés, until "Hedgehog's Dilemma" everything is filtered through Shinji's point of view; from "Rei I" onward, however, the other characters' perspectives are explored as well. Cannarsi noted Shinji wanders around Ashi Lake without getting too far from Misato, like a child who runs away in protest from home but wanders around a restricted area and is later found by his parents. Film Daze website editor Joshua Sorensen compared Shinji's attitude in "Hedgehog's Dilemma" to otaku, a Japanese term for young people who are obsessed with computers or particular aspects of pop culture to the detriment of their social skills. Writer Philip Brophy also described Kensuke as an "archetypal military otaku". The series' assistant director Kazuya Tsurumaki, noting "distant, awkward communication" can be observed between Shinji and other characters in the first episodes, described Evangelion as a "story about communication" that is directed to the otaku, criticized by director Anno for being overly closed in on themselves. Tsurumaki pointed out that Shinji continues to refuse to pilot the Eva in the following episodes, which led him to describe Evangelion as a story built on repetition. He also noted that Shinji never explicitly agrees to pilot the Eva in the final scene, even though he does so without hesitation as early as the next episode. AnimeFeminist website writer Jeremy Tauber interpreted the scene in which Shinji listens to his walkman ignoring the other train passengers as a reference to "how the electronics industry drove Japanese consumers to alienation". According to Tauber, Shinji does demonstrate the symptoms of social withdrawal felt by Japanese youth at the time, as his preference towards dissociation over socialization and camaraderie indicates. Tauber then compared Shinji's behaviour to hikikomori, young Japanese people who exhibit total withdrawal from society and seek extreme degrees of social isolation; while not describing Shinji as strictly hikikomori, he noted that skipping class, or fushūgaku, is "a tell-tale sign of social withdrawal and the descension into hikikomori-ism". Slant Magazine writer Michael Peterson similarly observed that the grouping of other passengers "is carefully arranged so as not to overburden or overcomplicate the image, all the while conveying Shinji's feelings of isolation in a crowd".

== Reception ==
"Hedgehog's Dilemma" aired on October 25, 1995, and scored a 5.8% rating of audience share on Japanese TV. The episode was generally well-received by critics. Stephen Bijan, writing for The Verge, described "Hedgehog's Dilemma"'s plot as one of the great tensions of the series and Shinji's reactions as instructive; he also considered the episode as an example of the show's capacity of "synthesizing its philosophical influences into a coherent, cohesive whole". Anime News Network's reviewer Nick Creamer described it as "harrowing" and a "wholly tonal, visually driven experience".

Screen Rant ranked it among the best Neon Genesis Evangelion episodes for its character exploration. EX.org's Peter Cahill praised "A Transfer" and "Hedgehog's Dilemma", but also stated "action fans might be a little disappointed in the story", since character psychology has a more prominent role in it than mecha fights. Max Covill of Film School Rejects ranked "Hedgehog's Dilemma" among the lowest of Neon Genesis Evangelion episodes; he criticized Shinji for being "whiny and unlikable", attributing the negative traits to the exclusion of Anno from the screenplay, but he also listed the scene of the colloquy between Shinji and Misato, with the Nerv logo in the background, among the "perfect shots" of the series. Anthony Gramuglia from Comic Book Resources defended Shinji's refusal to pilot the Eva and his weakness, comparing him to Amuro Ray from Mobile Suit Gundam, which he said was viewed "more favorably" by anime fans.

The Animé Café Japanese reviewer Akio Nagatomi described the scene in which Kensuke plays a survivor game alone as an example of the "incongruous character traits" presented in the episode. He also said that the viewer is never concerned about the plot development, since "It's just not that well written". Jane Nagatomi similarly described the ending as "predictable enough", but praised the scene in which Shinji, Toji and Kensuke talk as "really cute", "definitely a touch different". According to Yahoo! website, "Hedgehog's Dilemma" demonstrates what makes Shinji "a frustrating protagonist for many viewers", but in a thoughtful and atmospheric manner. Writer Dennis Redmond described the natural scenery around Tokyo-3 shown in the episode as "gorgeous". Forbes Lauren Orsini praised the final scene's still frame of Shinji and Misato, describing it as a "refreshing alternative" from the frenetic action of modern shows and "a silent response to the noise that allows us to look inward alongside these characters".

Psychology Today's Walter Veit attributed the popularization of the concept of the porcupine dilemma to Evangelion. The town of Hakone, the setting for the fictional Tokyo-3, has over the years launched tourism and urban development projects that use the series to promote the area, including dedicated initiatives in the Sengokuhara district, where Shinji first meets Kensuke. Official merchandise based on the episode has also been released, including lighters, umbrellas, and t-shirts.
