= A Transfer =

- Neon Genesis Evangelion episode
- The classmates of Shinji Ikari (in the middle) are amazed after he confesses to being an Eva pilot.
- Episode no.: Episode 3
- Directed by: Hirouiki Ishido
- Written by: Hideaki Anno; Akio Satsukawa
- Original air date: October 18, 1995
- Running time: 22 minutes

Episode chronology
← Previous "The Beast"	Next → "Hedgehog's Dilemma"

"A Transfer", known by the Japanese title "The Silent Phone", (Note: Japanese: 鳴らない、電話, Hepburn: Naranai, Denwa) is the third episode of the anime Neon Genesis Evangelion, created by animation studio Gainax. Series director Hideaki Anno and writer Akio Satsukawa wrote the episode, which was directed by Hiroyuki Ishido. It aired originally on TV Tokyo on October 18, 1995. The series is set fifteen years after a worldwide cataclysm known as the Second Impact, specifically in the futuristic fortified city of Tokyo-3. The protagonist is Shinji Ikari, a teenage boy whose father, Gendo, recruited him to the organization Nerv to pilot a giant mecha named Evangelion into combat with beings called Angels. In the episode, Shinji begins attending his new school in Tokyo-3 and has a difficult time dealing with the fame of being an Evangelion pilot. His classmate Toji Suzuhara, whose little sister was injured in Shinji's fight against the Angel Sachiel shown in the previous episode, is angry at him; a new Angel named Shamshel appears, and Shinji must once again pilot Eva-01 to defeat it.

Production for "A Transfer" began after the fifth and sixth episodes. The episode analyzes the characters' relationships and Shinji's psyche in particular. "A Transfer" scored a 7.1% rating of audience share on Japanese TV and received a divided reception. Critics praised the animation, sound, and character focus, while others criticized Toji's characterization and Shinji's actions.

== Plot ==
Shinji Ikari tries to adjust to his new life in Tokyo-3. He is now the official pilot of the giant mecha Evangelion 01 for the special agency Nerv and lives with Nerv's captain Misato Katsuragi, though their relationship is still distant. As the episode opens, he is lethargically going through the motions of training. In the morning he departs for school; Nerv's Dr. Ritsuko Akagi calls Misato to check on Shinji and is told that Shinji seems to have made no friends at school. There, Shinji's classmates Kensuke Aida, Toji Suzuhara, and Hikari Horaki are first introduced. They begin to discuss the battle between a mecha and an enemy named Sachiel, the third of a series of beings called Angels, which took place in the previous episode. Toji has only just returned to class for the first time since the fight, explaining that he had to care for his sister, who was injured in the battle with Sachiel. When Shinji's classmates discover his identity as a pilot, Toji blames him for his sister's injuries and gives him a beating in retaliation. Shinji's protestations that he was piloting involuntarily make Toji angrier.

The fourth Angel, Shamshel, attacks Tokyo-3, and Shinji is mobilized in Eva-01 to defend the city. Kensuke convinces Toji to sneak out of their shelter to watch the battle from nearby. Shinji loses his nerve to fight and is tossed into the air by Shamshel, almost killing Toji and Kensuke as he lands. This also severs Eva-01's Umbilical Cable, leaving it with just five minutes of reserve power. Shinji then begins fighting a defensive battle, attempting to protect Toji and Kensuke rather than defeat the Angel. To protect them from the battle, Misato orders Toji and Kensuke to take refuge in the Evangelion's cockpit. Inside, Toji sees Shinji's great anguish and pain as he fights the Angel, and is beset by remorse. Misato orders Shinji to retreat, but he loses his temper and charges Shamshel with his knife, defeating the Angel as its power runs out. Days later, Kensuke gives Toji the number of Shinji's phone so he can apologize; Toji attempts to call, but stops.

== Production ==
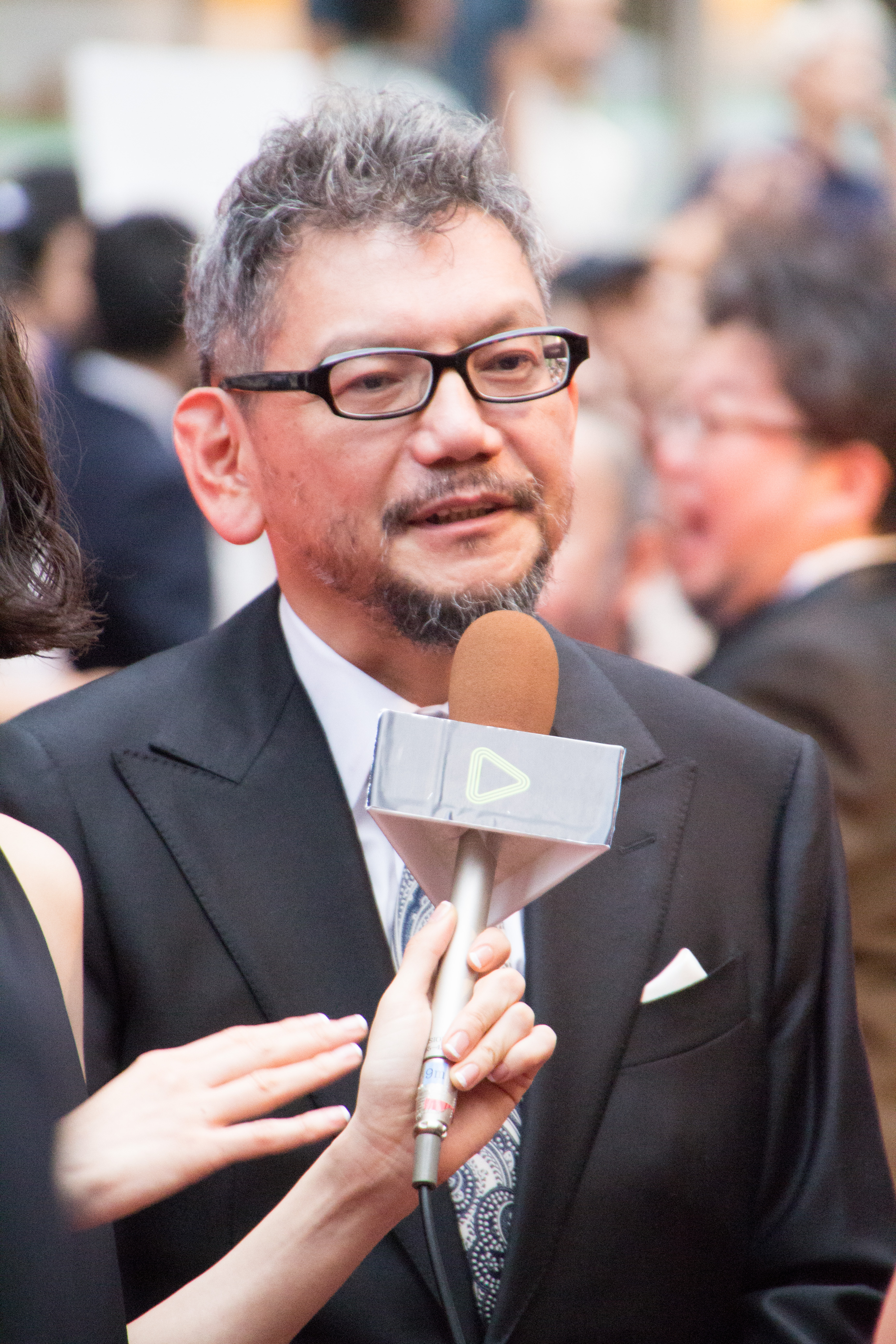
Neon Genesis Evangelion director Hideaki Anno

In 1993, Gainax studio wrote a presentation volume of Neon Genesis Evangelion named New Century Evangelion (tentative name) Proposal (新世紀エヴァンゲリオン (仮) 企画書, Shinseiki Evangelion (kari) kikakusho), containing a first draft of the planned episodes. The studio published the Proposal document in 1994. In the Proposal, the staff initially called the episode "The first telephone call" (初めてのTEL, Hajimete no tel). After the battle with the Angel, Shinji would have become friends with Toji and Kensuke, receiving a call from them; Gainax, however, changed the planned scenario and moved the beginning of the friendship to the following episode, "Hedgehog's Dilemma". As they were writing the scripts and the screenplay, the staff also felt that it would be logically implausible to have Shinji pilot Eva-01 again without first considering the effects of the boy's traumatic experience. Gainax later changed the original title to "The Silent Phone", with the English title "A Transfer".

Neon Genesis Evangelion director Hideaki Anno and Akio Satsukawa wrote the script for "A Transfer". Evangelion assistant director Kazuya Tsurumaki and Hiroyuki Ishido composed the storyboards. Ishido also served as director for the episode, while Nobuhiro Hosoi took the role of chief animator, and Tsurumaki and Yoshitō Asari served as assistant character designers. Asari also worked on Angel Shamshel's design. Animator Yō Yoshinari contributed to the depiction of the battle against Eva-01 and Shamshel. According to the schedule, Anno worked on the fifth and sixth episodes of the series, "Rei I" and "Rei II", before the third and fourth ones. For production reasons, the post-recording dubbing followed the same order. He felt he had to go beyond regular anime in developing realistic characters for "A Transfer" and "Hedgehog's Dilemma", so he tried to focus on Shinji's relationships in the installments.

Specific technical terminology was used for the simulated battle in the first scene, including terms such as "gain" and "induction mode". In the episode's original draft, Shinji was meant to use a large laser Gatling gun during training. In the scene where Toji talks about his sister, a shot of the roof of a civilian shelter collapsing was also planned, and Toji would have revealed that both of his parents, rather than only his father, worked for Nerv. The draft had not yet determined whether Kensuke would reprimand Toji, and the battle against Shamshel also differed slightly from the final version. Shamshel was meant to have arms that transformed into shields capable of deflecting projectiles, and during the battle it would have attacked Eva-01 with a knifehand strike, driving its hand into the Eva's body. Ritsuko would have encouraged Shinji to defeat the enemy, and after allowing Toji and Kensuke aboard Eva-01, Shinji was meant to avert his gaze with a displeased expression. In the following episode, Shinji would then have apologized to Toji and Kensuke for initially not wanting to let them aboard. Japanese academic Masaki Miyakawa noted how in Shinji's training scene, the control room where Ritsuko and Maya observe him has walls full of light indicators in the style of Leiji Matsumoto, particularly reminiscent of Space Battleship Yamato or Galaxy Express 999. In the episode, an image of a crater generated by the battle in the previous episode, "The Beast", was introduced, in which a mountain named Mount Takanosu was depicted. Tokyo-3 is also shown in a battle for the first time in "A Transfer"; for the landscapes of the city, Anno took inspiration from Tracy Island from the Thunderbirds series and the headquarters of UFO's SHADO organization.

Evangelion Chronicle, an official encyclopedia about the series, noted that the episode's screenplay deliberately subverts audience expectations. Viewers would typically expect Shinji to reconcile with Toji by the end of the story and finally receive a phone call, yet his phone—true to the episode's title—never rings, even in the closing scene, a choice that strengthens Toji's role within the narrative. Evangelion Chronicle also pointed out that mobile phones remained uncommon among the Japanese public in the late 1990s. As a result, Misato's decision to give a cellphone to Shinji, who was still a middle school student, stood out as remarkably unusual at the time. The publication further observes that Shinji's classroom features computers that the students actively use, even though personal computers still occupied the earliest stages of widespread adoption during the series' original broadcast, when most people regarded them as expensive technologies with relatively limited use. An imperfect three-dimensional representation of the Entry Plug was also added at the end of the episode, produced by Kensuke on his laptop according to his memories. Several voice actors were used again to portray Shinji's classmates in the installment; the female companions, in particular, are voiced by Yūko Miyamura, Kotono Mitsuishi, and Megumi Hayashibara, who also voice the characters of Asuka Langley Soryu, Misato Katsuragi, and Rei Ayanami. At the beginning of the episode, a radio program with two female speakers talking about Matsuzaki city was included, revealing details about the geography of the world of Evangelion. Junko Iwao and Yūko Miyamura voiced the two female speakers of the radio program. Eiji Maruyama, who worked on Mirai Keisatsu Urashiman and other anime series, also voiced Shinji's math teacher. British singer Claire Littley sang a cover of "Fly Me to the Moon" which was later used as the episode's closing theme song, replaced in late home video editions by another cover by Yōko Takahashi.

== Cultural references and themes ==
Angel Shamshel's design was informed by the Alien Bira from the Ultraseven series (1967).

Ritsuko Akagi mentions the hedgehog's dilemma, a psychoanalytic and philosophical term, to describe Shinji's behaviour in the first scenes. The concept is usually used to describe the behaviors of individuals with a borderline personality disorder. Like the hedgehogs described by philosopher Arthur Schopenhauer in his book Parerga and Paralipomena, Shinji is afraid to be hurt and withdraws from human contact. According to Schopenhauer's pessimistic philosophy, every human relationship is characterized by pain and miscommunication; the closer humans are, the easier it is to hurt each other. Akio Satsukawa added the term while writing the script. Schopenhauer's concept later becomes one of the show's main themes. As noted by writer Virginie Nebbia, all the main Evangelion characters hide their inner self for fear of being hurt, as in Schopenhauer's dilemma. It is revealed in the second half of the series that a secret society named Seele tries to merge all humanity into a single being, deleting human psychological barriers in a process named Human Instrumentality. For scholar River Seager, Evangelion Instrumentality can be regarded as a possible solution to Arthur Schopenhauer's dilemma. Animage magazine argued that the relationships between Gendo and Ritsuko, Shinji and Asuka, and Misato and Kaji all follow this scheme; Seele also physically hurts and attacks Nerv in the ending movie. According to writer Alexandre Marine, a similar concept can be found in Royal Space Force: The Wings of Honnêamise (1987) and The Secret of Blue Water, in which Nadia Arwol realizes she can't live without interacting with other people after a suicide attempt.

Gualtiero Cannarsi, responsible for the first Italian adaptation of the series, noted that one of Shinji's classmates seen in "A Transfer" resembles Nadia from The Secret of Blue Water. The episode also gives details about the Second Impact, which occurred on September 13, 2000; the date is a tribute to the TV show Space 1999, in which an explosion of radioactive waste deposits on the Moon takes place on September 13, 1999, causing the satellite to change its orbit. The information about the Second Impact presented in the episode is ultimately revealed to have been deliberately distorted in order to manipulate the civilian population in the following episodes. Mecha anime of the 1960s inspired the battle against Shamshel; the Angel's design is also reminiscent of Alien Bira, an extraterrestrial species that appeared in the Ultraman franchise. Torii are also framed during the battle against Shamshel, another reference to previous tokusatsu series. Newtype in particular noted how in one scene in "A Transfer" Shamshel walks by a lighthouse, highlighting its gigantic size; according to the magazine, Evangelion "perfectly captures the essence" of tokusatsu films. Writer Virginie Nebbia compared the battle against Shamshel to the works of director Akio Jissōji; typical elements of Jissōji's direction include reflections of glasses, the use of dazzling backlighting, and battles amplified by the orange of twilight. Nebbia also noted how the image of Shinji framed from above while going to school could be influenced by Osamu Dezaki's anime Dear Brother. Toji's introduction, on the other hand, resembles Shingo Kōzuki from Yoshiyuki Tomino's series Invincible Super Man Zambot 3, a stubborn boy who is initially hostile to the protagonist. Evangelion screenwriter Jun'ichi Satō compared the third and the fourth episode of the series to Mobile Suit Victory Gundam. Multiversity Comics' Matthew Garcia traced an influence on the episodes to Hideaki Anno's personal experience, particularly the production of his previous work, Nadia; according to him, like Anno on Nadia, Shinji is thrown into a situation he doesn't understand "or have much investment in".

The key theme of "A Transfer" and the following episode, "Hedgehog's Dilemma", is interpersonal communication. According to Newtype magazine, the work has "aspects of a youth drama", and even the drama between Shinji and his new classmates is portrayed with realism. "A Transfer" particularly focuses on Shinji's communication difficulties, rather than his battle with Shamshel. As the title "A Silent Phone" suggests, he is portrayed as unable to communicate with other people and uninterested in social relationships. The assistant director of the series, Kazuya Tsurumaki, noticed that at the beginning of the episode Shinji talks to Misato without going into her room or them looking at each other, "Like they are looking through a slightly opened door, but not connecting". Writer Álvaro Arbonés similarly noted how Misato speaks to Shinji in a distant manner in the first scenes, telling him to take out the trash, without any real emotional exchange or sincerity. Tsurumaki also pointed out how the same "distant, awkward communication" can be observed between Shinji and Rei and Shinji and his father, Gendo Ikari. He then described Neon Genesis Evangelion as a whole as a "story of communication". The only character who seems to be good at communicating is Kensuke, who uses his dialectical ability to instill guilt in Toji during the battle against Shamshel and push him to call Shinji in the last scene. His communicative ability, however, could be interpreted as a defense mechanism masking loneliness and inner fragility.

Shinji struggles to make friends and has a cold, laconic, reserved attitude in "A Transfer". He tries to lead a normal life and goes to school in the episode. Shinji also must find the fine line between duty and personal desire. He adopts a robot-like behaviour during training and a mechanical attitude at his new school, even though being a pilot makes him popular among his classmates. According to scholar Claudio Cordella, Shinji is still traumatized after his battle against Sachiel in the previous episode and has a repulsion for the Evangelion units. As noted by writer Hans-Georg Eilenberger, the Third Child has a hard time opening up to others and, as a result, is constantly wavering between emotional investment and withdrawal. According to scholar Sano Yasuyuki, Shinji is afraid to communicate with others, but he cannot cease desiring to touch others, as he still wants to be recognized by his father and has sexual interests in the female body. Yasuyuki noted how during the initial training scene, Shinji has a blank look, as if playing a video game; this means the Eva is nothing more than a video game whose system is controlled by another mysterious will for him. In a classic robotic animation series, the Eva should become Shinji's extended body; in Neon Genesis Evangelion, however, Shinji cannot control this "body" adequately. According to Andrew M. Winters, "it's no longer a matter of maintaining relationships, but it is a matter of survival that keeps Shinji in the pilot seat".

Another theme in "A Transfer" is masculinity. As noted by Yūichirō Oguro, the editor of supplemental materials included in the Japanese edition of the series, Neon Genesis Evangelion is skeptical about the patriarchal value of masculinity. In contrast with Shinji, Toji tries to act in a stereotypical masculine manner, but he is later symbolically punished in the series for this. According to academic Cristopher Smith, Shinji fails to perform or internalise violent hegemonic masculinity in the episode. Shinji does not even engage in this schoolyard scrap by fighting back when Toji beats him, but passively accepts the violence. After Toji's beating, Shinji curses his destiny of being an Eva pilot, saying he doesn't pilot by his choice. For Animedia magazine, Toji's confrontation with Shinji resembles a scene from a traditional Japanese youth drama (青春ドラマ, seishun dorama). Writer Philip Brophy also described Shinji's battle against Shamshel with cicadas in the background as an "audiovisual haiku" intoning "war as exhaustion; victory as aleatory; celebration as null". Shinji then demonstrates aggression throughout the course due to the lack of love and abandonment he suffered at the hands of his father at a young age. For Yasuyuki, another Neon Genesis Evangelion theme found in "A Transfer" is refusal; Shinji, for example, refuses to accept his guilt when Toji beats him. As noted by Arbonés, however, during the battle, Shinji decides to put his classmates and their safety before himself. Inside Eva-01's cockpit, Toji realizes the kind of suffering that Shinji goes through each time he mounts the Eva. According to scholar Khegan M. DelPort, Evangelion's moral seems to be that "we have to live with other people". For writer Gionathan C. Pacheco, Neon Genesis Evangelion can thus be described as a "manifesto against individualistic escapism".

== Reception ==
"A Transfer" aired on October 18, 1995, and scored a 7.1% rating of audience share on Japanese TV. Psychology Today's Walter Veit attributed the popularization of the concept of the porcupine dilemma to Neon Genesis Evangelion. Official merchandise based on the episode has been released, including lighters and t-shirts. Furthermore, according to Yahoo! website Shamshel's design almost certainly inspired the final form of Jean Jacket in Jordan Peele's movie Nope (2022).

The episode met with a divided reception. Screen Rant criticized Toji's aggression, as Comic Book Resources' Ajay Aravind did; according to Aravind, his behavior "has no rhyme nor reason to it, making him a classic bully". Screen Rant's Jack Cameron placed the battle against Shamshel among the lowest of Neon Genesis Evangelion fights, while Film School Rejects Max Covill criticized Shinji's actions, describing them as "frustrating". The Anime Café's reviewer Akio Nagatomi praised Shinji's manner to cope with the pressures of his pilot role and the glimpse into what the civilians go through in the battles. He also praised the animation, soundtrack, and directing, but criticized Shinji's revelation of being a pilot to his classmates as "some socially-inept writer's attempt to live out some adolescent fantasy". Jane Nagatomi similarly criticized the episode as "too predictable". Newtype magazine described the silhouette of Eva-01 and Shamshel standing still in the twilight after the battle as "impressive". Yahoo! website described Eva-01 and Shamshel's fight as a "great fight scene", but also noted how it "still ranks fairly low compared to others in Evangelion". EX.org's Peter Cahill praised "the wanton destruction and desperate heroism" of the battle, also eulogizing the animation of "A Transfer" and "Hedgehog's Dilemma". Supanova Expo's official website similarly ranked the scene in which Shinji rescues his classmates from Shamshel among the best moments of the character.
