= Rei I =

- Neon Genesis Evangelion episode
- The scene of Shinji Ikari and Rei Ayanami arguing on the escalator. The image lasts more than thirty seconds and has been analyzed by anime critics.
- Episode no.: Episode 5
- Directed by: Keiichi Sugiyama
- Written by: Hideaki Anno, Akio Satsukawa
- Original air date: November 1, 1995
- Running time: 22 minutes

Episode chronology
← Previous "Hedgehog's Dilemma"	Next → "Rei II"

"Rei I", also known by the Japanese title "Rei, Beyond the Heart", (Note: Japanese: レイ、心のむこうに, Hepburn: Rei, kokoro no mukō ni) is the fifth episode of the anime Neon Genesis Evangelion, which was created by animation studio Gainax. "Rei I" was written by Hideaki Anno and Akio Satsukawa, and directed by Keiichi Sugiyama. It was first broadcast on TV Tokyo on November 1, 1995. The series is set fifteen years after a worldwide cataclysm named Second Impact, mostly in the futuristic, fortified city called Tokyo-3. The episode's protagonist is Shinji Ikari, a teenage boy who is recruited by his father Gendo into the organization Nerv to pilot a giant biomechanical mecha named Evangelion to combat certain beings called Angels. In the episode, Shinji tries, but fails, to connect with Rei Ayanami, a fellow pilot, who is close to his distant and cold father Gendo.

When it was first broadcast, "Rei I" scored a 7.2% rating of audience share on Japanese TV. The episode won popularity polls and was praised by critics, who appreciated the introduction of Rei's character and her mysteriousness. Scientific concepts are mentioned in the installment, which contains cultural references to DNA, nitrogenous bases, and wave-particle duality. "Rei I" contains references to earlier fictional works as well, such as The Andromeda Strain and Sailor Moon. The laconic attitude of Rei's character has also been linked by critics to the Japanese socio-cultural situation, in particular with the generation born in the seventies and with a martyr complex. Critics analyzed Rei's home as well, comparing it to buildings of postwar Japan. Merchandise based on the episode has also been released by Gainax.

== Plot ==
The episode opens with a flashback to twenty-two days before. Rei Ayanami, the pilot of a giant mecha named Evangelion, is subjected with her Unit 00 to a test by operatives of the special agency Nerv. During the test, Eva-00 malfunctions, smashing the walls and windows of the room before eventually coming to a stop. Rei's cockpit is ejected during the emergency; Gendo Ikari, commander of Nerv, runs to open the cabin to make sure of Rei's status. The pilot, though injured, is still alive and conscious, while Gendo burns his palm and drops and damages his glasses.

In the present, Shinji Ikari, pilot of Unit 01, notices that Rei is always alone at school but appears to have a good relationship with his father Gendo, who instead is cold towards him. Shinji is tasked with delivering the new Nerv ID card to Rei and heads to her apartment. Finding the door unlocked and open, the boy enters and happens upon his father's damaged old glasses, which Rei is storing on her nightstand as a keepsake. Being distracted by the glasses, Shinji is taken by surprise when he accidentally bumps into a naked Rei, and ends up tripping and landing on top of her in a fit of panic. Rei does not flinch at the awkwardness of the situation and proceeds to stoically ignore her colleague and put her underwear on as he frantically tries to apologize and explain himself. Rei is later subjected to a new test with Eva-00, which is interrupted by an attack by a new enemy, the fifth Angel Ramiel. Shinji exits with Eva-01 to intercept the Angel, who fires a particle cannon, hitting the mecha's chest. Shinji screams in pain as Eva-01's chest begins to melt from the heat.

== Production ==
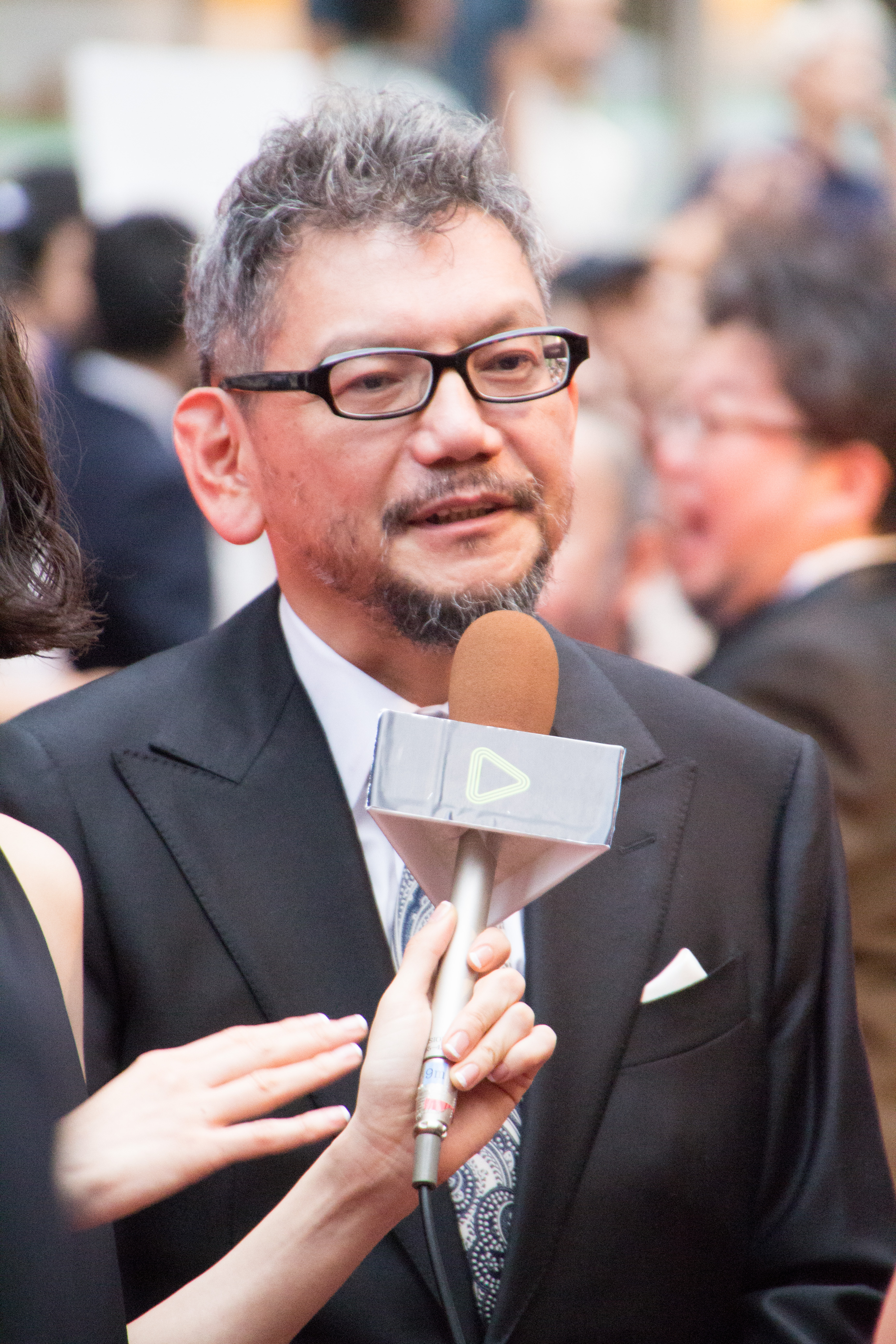
Neon Genesis Evangelion director Hideaki Anno

According to an official Neon Genesis Evangelion booklet, the fourth episode, "Hedgehog's Dilemma", was once omitted in terms of the series composition, and it was planned that "Rei I" would come after the third, "A Transfer". After the battle against Angel Shamshel, Shinji would become friends with his classmates Toji Suzuhara and Kensuke Aida in the third episode, receiving a call from them. As production progressed, however, staff members said they thought there was a need to depict Shinji's relationships with the people around him after the third episode. As they were writing the scripts and the screenplay, the staff also felt that it would be logically implausible to have Shinji pilot Eva-01 again without first considering the effects of the boy's traumatic experience. Neon Genesis Evangelion director Hideaki Anno was also stuck after writing the script for the first episode, "Angel Attack", which took half a year to complete, and he wrote "Rei I" and the sixth episode "Rei II" before the third and the fourth. For production reasons, the post-recording dubbing followed the same order. Akio Satsukawa and Hideaki Anno wrote the episode; Anno also worked on Ramiel's design. Jun'ichi Satō drew the storyboards under the pseudonym of Kiichi Jinme, Keiichi Sugiyama served as director and Masahiko Ohtsuku as assistant director. Shunji Suzuki worked as chief animator, while Seiji Kio served as setting assistant.

In 1993 Gainax wrote a presentation document of Neon Genesis Evangelion named New Century Evangelion (tentative name) Proposal (新世紀エヴァンゲリオン (仮) 企画書, Shinseiki Evangelion (kari) kikakusho) to find potential sponsors for the series, with the basic plot of the episode already programmed. The Proposal document was then published in 1994. The Japanese title "Rei, Beyond Her Heart" was also planned. In the episode's original draft, Gainax planned to equip the Evangelions with a positron engine made of a "pure crystalline metal of unknown origin". The staff also planned a scene in which Shinji would wonder why more Eva units were not being built and another in which Toji, jealous of the girls' attention toward Shinji, would attempt a basketball shot. Both ideas were later revisited for the seventh and seventeenth episode before ultimately being discarded. Rei was still to wear her eye bandage, while neither Misato Katsuragi's pet penguin's name, nor Ritsuko's remarks about Commander Ikari's inability to live had yet been conceived. Ritsuko would refer to Eva-00 as "Proto Evangelion", and her conversation with Misato about the cause of the activation test accident was originally intended to take place while the test was still in progress. Finally, the staff planned for Eva-00 to fail to activate because its internal battery had been completely depleted, as well as a scene in which Ramiel would be struck by cruise missiles.

Once the first part of Shinji's character arc was over in the previous episodes, the director decided to focus on Rei Ayanami in the two installments that followed. During the production, Anno encountered difficulties writing the character, not feeling "particularly interested" nor relating to her, but he thought of her as a representation of his unconscious mind. He also said that he forgot about her existence during production, giving her just a marginal space. In the fifth episode, explicitly dedicated to her character, Rei speaks seven lines and fifty-two words in the whole installment. Her storyline also changed. In the second draft of the scenario for the first episode, it was planned for Rei to rescue Shinji with an Eva. According to Neon Genesis Evangelion assistant director Kazuya Tsurumaki, the tentative plot would have given a valid reason for Shinji to choose to get on 01, thinking that Rei was hurt because of him, but the storyline was changed. A final scenario, in which Rei is injured during a botched Eva-00 test, was then considered. Moreover, the idea of Gendo's glasses being broken during the test was provided by Yoshiyuki Sadamoto, the character designer of the series.

For the scene of Rei and Shinji on the Nerv escalators, the staff graphically reproduced the effects of relative motion, making an ascending escalator appear faster, and a second one, which follows the camera movement, appear slower. While the scene where Shinji enters Rei's room was done in the typical style of Neon Genesis Evangelion, the scene where Rei is described as a normal girl was done in the style of Jun'ichi Satō, who previously worked on the Sailor Moon series. In the meal scene between Misato, Ritsuko and Shinji, Misato was represented taking inspiration from Usagi Tsukino, the protagonist of Sailor Moon. In the same scene, staff inserted graphic and humorous symbols on the characters' heads, taking inspiration from the shōjo manga and Sailor Moon. Furthermore, Sato tried to represent the scene in which Shinji is discovered in Rei's room by imitating the style of Leiji Matsumoto. He also wanted to add more details to the description of daily life, but Anno thought it would be excessive. Anno only gave the instruction to represent Rei's room as a "bleak room", and to represent it Akio Satsukawa was inspired by a flat he saw when he worked as a part-time plumber. It was easy for Satsukawa to write "Rei I", and the final product did not differ much from the initial draft he wrote.

Animator and screenwriter Mitsuo Iso had the idea of adding a rainbow in Rei's room scene. Iso chose it because since ancient times it had been considered a symbol of the path to Heaven and the Covenant between Man and God. In the original project, Rei would have eaten the flesh of an ancient ruin located in the depths of Nerv, Arqa, as in Daijirō Morohoshi's Koushi Ankoku. In her room in Arqa, there would have been many glasses, so as to create rainbows, flasks, and test tubes, German technical books, the Old Testament, and many toys—none of which, however, were human-shaped. In her apartment, there would also have been the symbol of the Essenes and an object representing the Tree of Life, similar to the Devil Tower in Steven Spielberg's Close Encounters of the Third Kind (1977). Iso also specified that "blood-stained eye bandage should be clearly identified as such, or a lot of numbskulls will get the wrong idea". In an early draft of the script, Shinji was supposed to be covered head to toe in Rei's underwear. However, as work progressed, this initial version seemed too suggestive and mischievous to the staff; the scene was thus reworked with a more comical twist. Jin Yamanoi and Yūko Miyamura voiced the unnamed Nerv technical operators in the episode, Kōichi Nagano and Hiro Yūki played two boys from Shinji's school, while Megumi Hayashibara, Rei's Japanese voice actress, sang a version of Fly Me to the Moon named "Rei #5" used as the ending theme.

== Cultural references, style and themes ==
Rei's apartment with blood stains and pill bottles has been compared with the Satyam, scientific laboratories of Aum Shinrikyō, and the works of artist Damien Hirst.

"Rei I" makes reference to scientific and biological concepts. During the incident where Eva-00 malfunctioned, for example, the Nerv use a special bakelite to block the Eva units, named after the homonymous phenol formaldehyde resin. In the following scenes, Dr. Ritsuko talks about the Angels' genetic similarity with humans; she analyzes the body of the fourth Angel, Shamshel, and its wave spectrum, finding it similar to the human gene. The words "pattern: blue" appear on her computer screen, since Angel's matter has a wavelength corresponding to that of blue light. On another screen also appears a map of human DNA, with the letters A, C, G, and T, corresponding to the nitrogenous bases — adenine, cytosine, guanine, and thymine. According to Ritsuko, although there are differences in constituent materials, the two maps have the same waveform pattern, and their signal arrangement and coordinates are 99.89% matched. The book Evangelion Glossary (エヴァンゲリオン用語事典, Evangerion Yougo Jiten) by Yahata Shoten noted how the number is higher than the percentage of genetic similarity between humans and monkeys. For academic Philip Brophy, this means Angels are more terrestrial than extraterrestrial and "more than mere Others". Japanese magazine Animage linked this resemblance to the traditional Christian angelic hierarchy in Thomas Aquinas Summa Theologica or De Coelesti Hierarchia by Pseudo-Dionysius the Areopagite, according to which angels occupy the lowest rank of the celestial hierarchy and are therefore the closest to humankind.

Ritsuko observes that the composition of the Angels appears to have both wave and particle properties, just as light does; Neon Genesis Evangelion manga English edition editor Carl Gustav Horn noted that the photons through which the electromagnetic spectrum is expressed have similar features. Writers Kazuhiza Fujie and Martin Forster similarly likened Ritsuko's statement to the wave-particle duality of quantum materials. In the same scene, a "code 601" appears on the computer screen, indicating the improbability of analysis. The code is a tribute to a similar scene from The Andromeda Strain (1971), based on the novel of the same name by Michael Crichton. Furthermore, in the first Eva-00 experiment scene, the English writing "Border Line" can be read on the Nerv monitors, indicating an absolute limit beyond which the Eva unit and its pilot are synchronized; according to writer Alexandre Marine, the Border Line can be linked to the borderline personality disorder, which leads sufferers to be prone to suicide or fits of rage. Gendo, who usually remains cold and emotionally detached, burns his hands while trying to rescue Rei in the scene. Writer Álvaro Arbonés noted how Gendo injures his hands just like Eva-01 did in the third episode, when Shinji saved Toji Suzuhara and Kensuke Aida from the Angel Shamshel. Ritsuko, on the other hand, seems offended by Gendo's attention to Rei. According to Arbonés, Rei is able to synchronize with her Eva-00 in the second experiment thanks to Gendo's rescue, because she is emotionally calmer and more open to another human being. Arbonés argued that up until the previous episode, the entire story is filtered through Shinji's point of view; from "Rei I" onward, however, the other characters' perspectives are explored as well. Moreover, contrary to narrative conventions, Rei is the protagonist of the episode but remains a passive object of events, and everything is filtered through Shinji's interest and actions.

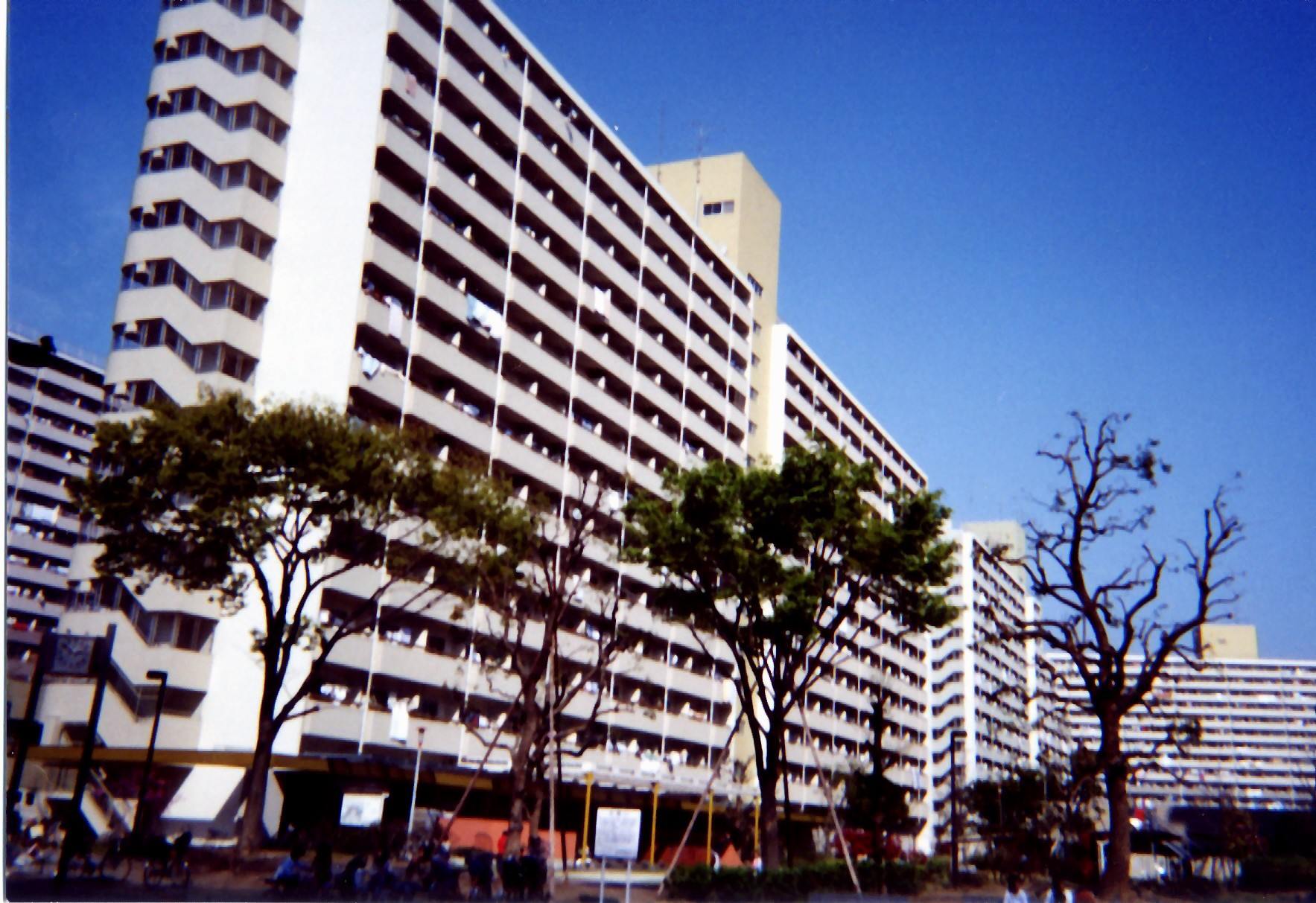
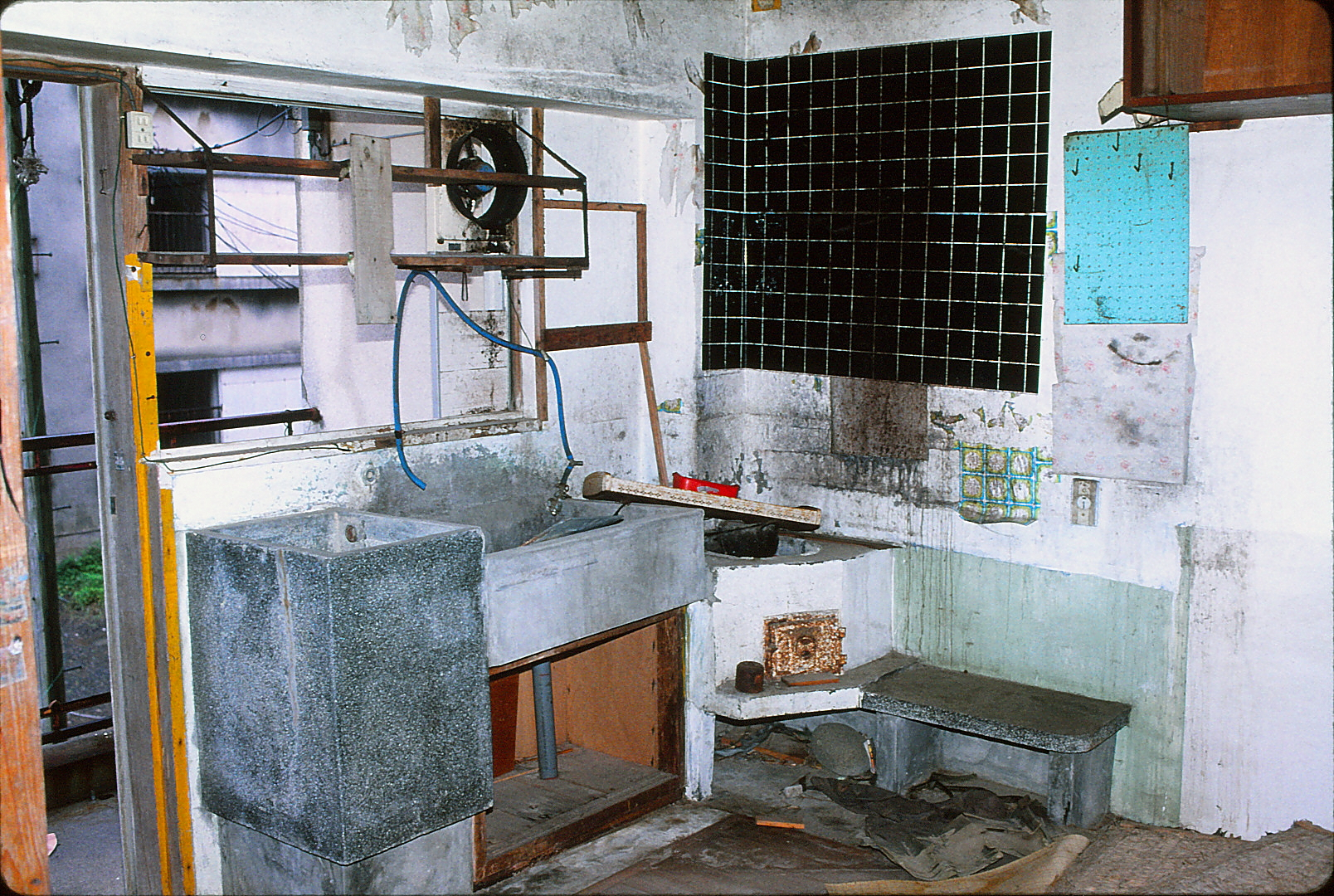
Rei Ayanami's building has been compared to the danchi, large clusters of apartment buildings or houses typical of postwar Japan.

In "Rei I", Shinji, while beginning to come to terms with his role as an Evangelion pilot, develops curiosity towards another pilot. He discovers that his cold father Gendo smiles and cares for Rei, changing his whole perspective after this; he then tries to communicate and establish a relationship with her, but Rei refuses to open up to him and does not understand the meaning of his actions. Evangelion assistant director Kazuya Tsurumaki pointed out the "distant, awkward communication" between Shinji and Rei on one hand, and Shinji and his father on the other in the first episodes, describing Neon Genesis Evangelion as a story about communication. Tsurumaki also noted that Shinji naturally accepts piloting the Eva by this point in the story. Justin Wu from The Artifice noted how it is revealed that all records of Rei's past have been erased from the database of Nerv, and this "generates the sense of mysteriousness surrounding the character"; Wu also noted that before Evangelion mysterious characters were people with a twisted and often tragic past, while Rei is presented as a girl with no past. For Japanese reviewer Akio Nagatomi, Rei's passive attitude also reflects one of the traits of traditional Japanese society – the martyr complex – in which a person will do whatever it takes to accomplish a given task, regardless of personal consequences. Furthermore, Shinji sees Rei conversing with his father in one scene, smiling and jumping like a girl in love; according to Jun'ichi Satō, this could be an excess of the animators and can be interpreted as a misunderstanding on the part of Shinji.

In another scene, Shinji tries to strike up a conversation on an escalator and criticizes Gendo in the process. Shinji says he doesn't trust his father, for which Rei slaps him. Kazuhisa Fujie and Martin Foster noticed that Rei slapped him "in very much the same way a mother would react to a selfish child". They linked Rei's slap to the fact that, as revealed in the series, Rei is a clone of Shinji's mother, Yui Ikari. Critics Brian Camp and Julie Davis described the escalators as a characteristic element of the series and of Anno's directional style. Writer Virginie Nebbia compared Evangelion use of escalators with the directional style of Akio Jissōji, who worked, among other things, on the Ultraman series. Academic Susan J. Napier, following critic Toru Endo, interpreted the descent into the base of Nerv and the images of escalators and elevators as a "descent into the subconscious". For movie critic Krystian Woznicki, the static mechanicalness of escalators is reminiscent of the beginnings of the anime medium, when stories were to a large extent verbal narrations. Viewers discover that Gendo's glasses broke in the flashback scene during the test; after Gendo saves her, Rei keeps them with her. Writer Fabio Bartoli linked the glasses to the crystal; Bartoli interpreted it as a reference to the shinjinrui (新人類; lit. "new human race"): the Japanese generation born in the 1970s, which is also known as crystal-zoku (クリスタル族; lit. "crystal tribe"), characterized by communication and social problems. For Animage magazine, the fact that Rei cherishes the glasses of Gendo, the "person she trusts the most", proves Rei is a teenage girl with emotions, although "she probably grew up without ever learning how to express her feelings".

During the episode, the HLM neighborhood in which Rei lives is also framed, made up of identical temporary buildings, slated to be demolished along with Rei's. Critics compared her building to the danchi, the dense, cheap housing complexes that appeared in postwar Japan, and to the character's biography, noting she's a replaceable clone. Anime Feminist writer Jeremy Tauber also said that the damaged, cracked roads surrounding the complex "bring back unpleasant memories of the Kobe earthquake". According to Japanese academic Tsuyoshi Ito, Ayanami's residential complex resembles the Japanese city of Chiba, and it is one of the distinct features of Evangelion's urban scenarios. Tokyo-3, however, also features Shinjuku-like skyscrapers, similar to the thirteen towers of Shinjuku in Ryū Murakami's Coin Locker Babies; therefore, Evangelion's urban scenarios are a fusion of Shinjuku and Chiba. According to Evangelion Chronicle, an official encyclopedia about the series, Rei's room reinforces an image of her that departs from the conventional anime heroine; the episode also contrasts the warm, lived-in atmosphere of Misato's apartment, filled with clothes and personal belongings, with the stark austerity of Rei's apartment, where her school uniform appears to be the only clothing she owns. Critic and philosopher Hiroki Azuma described Rei's room as similar to a science laboratory, particularly a medical one. He likened the room to the Satyam, scientific laboratories of Aum Shinrikyō, a Japanese religious sect at the center of media attention during the broadcast of the series. Writer Morikawa compared the image of Rei's room full of scattered medicines to the works of artist Damien Hirst, who is known for having used shelves of medicines as a conceptual art installation. There are also blood-stained bandages carelessly thrown away in her room. According to academic Philip Brophy, it seems modeled by Rei's "interior nothingness, as if she inhabits a sensory deprivation chamber". Writer Dennis Redmond also interpreted the images of the high-tech laboratory, identified with Ritsuko, as a reflection of the social and natural history of postwar Japan.

When Shinji enters Rei's room, she is presented naked after a shower; he accidentally falls on her whilst, touching her breasts in the process. Rei doesn't seem embarrassed by Shinji seeing her naked; she gets dressed and leaves without saying a word. Scholar Satoshi Tsukamoto described this brief encounter as "the beginning of their relationship". The scene has been described as a criticism or parody of typical anime fan service. Anime Feminist writers concurred that the scene, with its lack of music and long silence, "is not played for comedy at all". According to Christopher Kay from The Artifice, Anno uses such scenes to criticize the escapism of anime fans, who take refuge in a fictional and accommodating world. Carl Gustav Horn noted that the scene is "reminiscent of the most controversial one in Gainax's Honneamise", but it's an "eerie, mysterious scene, and erotic in a dark way rather than that of the 'cute' service shots". According to academic Yumiko Yano, Rei gives the impression of "innocence and purity", and the scene shows how she is indifferent to her own nudity and sexuality; Rei does not block the male gaze and is passive toward the viewer's sexual desires. According to Yano, this "innocent childishness" of Rei also makes men feel comfortable approaching her, and this gives Rei a "Lolita charm". Kaichiro Mirokawa also noted how Rei is presented covered with bandages at the beginning of the series; in "Rei I", however, she is depicted without any signs of injury, even though the interior of the room has blood stains and other elements to emphasise her convalescence. This suggests that the element of bandages was a stylistic choice rather than an important element for the plot. Writer Virginie Nebbia compared Rei and Shinji's scene to the anime Dear Brother, directed by Osamu Dezaki; in one scene in the anime, the protagonist Nanako discovers the apartment of the mysterious Rei Asaka. The audience has the impression of entering a secret sanctuary, a reflection of the character's disturbed psyche. Nebbia also pointed out that Evangelion thus can be seen as a denunciation, conscious or otherwise, of the otaku fetishization of the female body.

== Reception ==
"Rei I" was first broadcast on November 1, 1995, and attained a rating of 7.2% viewership on Japanese TV, the highest up to that point. Academic writer Olga Kopylova noted that Rei Ayanami enjoyed "a huge following" from "Rei I" onwards. In 1996, the episode ranked fifth among "best anime episodes" by Animage magazine's Grand Prix poll. Newtype praised "Rei I", describing the animation of the scene in which she smiles at Gendo as "excellent", while Digitally Obsessed's reviewer Joel Cunningham similarly lauded the installment, describing as a "pretty engaging" episode, "simply because Rei is such a fascinating character": "The cliffhanger ending, some mecha action, and some cute interplay between Shinji and Misato helps as well". Japanese website Merumo described Shinji's concern for Rei as one of the "highlights of the episode", and the scene in which Shinji encounters Rei after her shower as "famous". Critics also praised Rei's introduction and mysterious aura.

Protoculture Addicts gave a positive review to the home video issue with "Rei I" and "Rei II". Animé Café reviewer Akio Nagatomi appreciated its introduction of new mysteries and interactions, as "the writing seems to deliberately try to pace this interest with the level of interest generated in the audience". In their book Anime Classics Zettai!, writers Brian Camp and Julie Davis described the scene in which Shinji and Rei talk on an escalator as an example of the "intricate geometric compositions" in which Neon Genesis Evangelion characters are often placed, praising the composition and the editing of the scenes of the series. Philosopher Hiroki Azuma praised the depiction of her room, saying that, "Rei's solitude is grounded in a completely tactile substantiality that gives us extremely realistic images of the discommunication that children of the present face". Animator Yūichirō Oguro also expressed appreciation for the character design, the animation, and the work of chief animator Shunji Suzuki. A negative comment came from Comic Book Resources' Rhett Intiago, who criticized the scene in which Shinji accidentally touches Rei's breasts as a sexual assault: "Rei is completely unfazed, but that does not excuse the fact that now, Shinji has not only broken into her apartment but sexually assaulted her as well".

In the nineteenth episode of the Claymore anime series, Raki saves Priscilla from a falling block of bricks, ending up on top of her. Raki realizes he has his hand on Priscilla's breast, and then stands up embarrassed to apologize. The scene has been compared to the one where Shinji falls on Rei in "Rei I". The episode also inspired merchandise, including T-shirts and noodles.
