= The Beast (Neon Genesis Evangelion) =

- Neon Genesis Evangelion episode
- Shinji Ikari staring at the ceiling in Misato Katsuragi's apartment
- Episode no.: Episode 2
- Directed by: Kazuya Tsurumaki
- Written by: Hideaki Anno; Yoji Enokido
- Story by: Gainax
- Original air date: October 11, 1995
- Running time: 22 minutes

Episode chronology
← Previous "Angel Attack"	Next → "A Transfer"

"The Beast", known by the Japanese title "Unfamiliar Ceilings", (Note: Japanese: 見知らぬ、天井, Hepburn: Mishiranu, Tenjō) is the second episode of the anime Neon Genesis Evangelion, created by animation studio Gainax. The episode was written by the series director Hideaki Anno and Yōji Enokido and directed by Kazuya Tsurumaki. It aired originally on TV Tokyo on October 11, 1995.

The series is set fifteen years after a worldwide cataclysm named Second Impact, particularly in the futuristic fortified city of Tokyo-3. The protagonist is Shinji Ikari, a teenage boy who is recruited by his father Gendo to the organization Nerv to pilot a giant biomechanical mecha named Evangelion into combat with beings called Angels. During the episode, Shinji faces the Angel Sachiel but freezes with fear and fails to defend his Eva-01, which is left damaged and inoperable. Shinji wakes up in a hospital the next day and is taken in by Nerv's Captain Misato Katsuragi, who becomes his new legal guardian.

Production of "The Beast" began in September 1994 and ended in May 1995. Staff used Christian religious symbolism in the episode, with the intent of differentiating the show from other mecha series. The title itself, "The Beast", references the beast from the Book of Revelation. The episode scored a 5.3% rating of audience share on Japanese TV and received critical and public acclaim focused on its visuals, direction, and sound.

== Plot ==
Pilot Shinji Ikari prepares to face an enemy named Sachiel, the third of a series of beings called Angels, in his mecha Evangelion 01. Shinji manages to move his Eva, making it try a successful first step. As he attempts to take a second step, the Eva trips, falls over, and lands face-first on the ground. Eva-01 is left helpless as Sachiel advances on it; Shinji is frozen with fear and fails to defend himself as the Angel proceeds to pick up the Eva by the face and then damages its left arm and right eye. The pilot's signal is lost, and the Eva powers down. Suddenly, a confused Shinji wakes up in a hospital room the next day; the dramatic battle having been resolved off-screen. Meanwhile, his father, Gendo Ikari, head of the special agency Nerv, meets with the organization's mysterious benefactors, the Human Instrumentality Committee. The Chairman of the Committee, Keel Lorenz, instructs him not to let the reappearance of the Angels allow a process named the Human Instrumentality Project to fall behind schedule. Shinji sees his fellow pilot Rei Ayanami at the hospital. He also has a brief encounter with his father, but the two of them don't talk. Nerv's captain Misato Katsuragi shows up to check on Shinji in the aftermath of the battle. When she learns that Shinji is going to live alone, she decides to take him in to live with her instead.

Shinji arrives at Misato's apartment. Later that evening, he lies alone in his new bedroom. As he does so, sounds from the battle are heard and images of nerve cells as viewed through a microscope flash across the screen. In a flashback, Shinji remembers that Eva-01 was rendered inoperative by Sachiel's attack, with Nerv losing control of the Eva. Eva-01 reactivates and begins to act on its own. It launches a vicious attack upon the Angel, succeeding in damaging its face. A second attack by the Eva is blocked by a barrier named A.T. Field, but the Eva erodes it with another A.T. Field. Once the barrier is down, Eva-01 soundly defeats Sachiel by shattering the downed Angel's core. Sachiel wraps itself around the Eva and self-destructs; Eva-01 emerges from the explosion with little apparent damage. As Nerv regains control of the Evangelion, Shinji comes to in the cockpit. The damaged helmet sloughs off, and Shinji can glimpse the Eva's face reflected in the windows of a building. As he looks on, the Eva's eye regenerates and focuses straight at him. Shinji begins to scream, and the flashback ends. He slowly curls up in bed after recalling the battle; Misato comes to his door and praises him for piloting the Eva and saving the city.

== Production ==
I wonder if a person over the age of twenty who likes robot anime and bishōjo anime is really happy. If this person doesn't know that greater happiness exists even until he died, he is probably happy. Regrettably, I have my doubts about his happiness. As I was making this work I wanted to try to consider what in the world could the 'happiness' of such a person be?

— Hideaki Anno during the production of the first two episodes

Production for "The Beast" began in September 1994, simultaneously with "Angel Attack", and ended in May 1995. Yōji Enokido and Hideaki Anno wrote the script, while Kazuya Tsurumaki served as director for the episode. Unlike the previous installment, Gainax produced "The Beast" with a non-linear narrative, interspersed with continuous flashbacks and scene changes; Anno remained dissatisfied with "Angel Attack" during the post-recording and described it as "a failure", since it couldn't beat the first episode of the original Mobile Suit Gundam series, an episode so highly regarded by Anno himself and the series' staff that they knew its scenes, shot compositions, and narrative structure by heart. He was disappointed by the script and the structure, judging it "three minutes too long", so he completely reworked "The Beast" in the middle. Continuing their work from "Angel Attack", Anno and assistant director Masayuki composed the storyboards. Shinya Hasegawa handled the key animation around the scene where Misato is drinking beer in her apartment and suggests Shinji take a bath, while Yoshitō Asari and Seiji Kio served as assistant character designers.

The Japanese title "Unfamiliar Ceilings" was decided on in 1993, when Gainax wrote a presentation document of Neon Genesis Evangelion titled New Century Evangelion (tentative name) Proposal (新世紀エヴァンゲリオン (仮) 企画書, Shinseiki Evangelion (kari) kikakusho). The beginning of a battle between an Angel named Raziel and berserk Unit 01 was planned for "Angel Attack" in the Proposal, but it was moved to "The Beast" and the Angel changed to Sachiel. In Gainax's original plans, Sachiel was to fire a rapid-fire cannon and tear off Eva-01's arm rather than merely breaking it. Shinji would awaken in the hospital thinking about the loss of the arm, without the scene of the pierced skull, and the Committee for the Instrumentality Project would also include female members. After the meeting with the Committee, which contained no explicit mention of the Instrumentality Project, Gendo would slam his fist on the table. The episode's original draft did not yet include either the name of Misato's pet penguin, or the scene in which Misato feels guilty for using Shinji. During the second half of the battle, Sachiel was also to wield an arrow, which it would drive into Eva-01's head; in Gainax's original plans, Eva-01 was also to have biological teeth. The episode would conclude with Shinji crying on his bed.

When designing Misato's apartment, Gainax chose to include automatic doors from the outset because they were easier to animate. To represent Sachiel's AT Field, the main staff used special lighting effects, which appear and disappear for short frames. Yoshinari took care of the battle scene, trying to draw the shoulders and face of the Eva-01 using rulers. The staff also made extensive use of close-ups during the episode. During the battle, before Eva-01's berserk mode, the crew zoomed in on Shinji's face in close-up, giving the idea of wide-angle lens, and deforming it with CG. Writer Giuseppe Gatti described Shinji's face cut as "psychedelic". Shinji was originally supposed to reach a 400% synchro rate with Eva-01 in the clash, but the idea was later presented in the last part of the series instead. For the image of the Eva-01 destroying the AT Field, Hideaki Anno took inspiration from the image of tearing clothes, considering them as the most elementary form of protection for human beings; the concept was included in "The Beast" with no philosophical implications, and Anno thought about its meaning as the "walls of the heart" during the production of the latter part of the series. He also added the term Human Instrumentality Project, one of the most important concepts for the plot, by improvising and without having clear ideas about it. He stated that he had no idea about what Instrumentality was going to "complement" at the time, so the whole scene "is just a verbal bluff".

For the battle between Eva-01 and Sachiel Gainax created integration between the backdrops and the moving objects on several levels. Takeshi Honda, chief animator for the episode, and Yō Yoshinari handled the key animation of the scene. The fight was initially close to a tokusatsu battle in the style of Ultraman, but, according to Yūichirō Oguro, Honda apparently decided to give the scene a more anime style. Oguro noted that Honda draws characters in a more sophisticated style, unlike the animation director of the first episode, Shunji Suzuki, who tries to be more faithful to Sadamoto's character design instead. He also noted that people are depicted at the edge of the screen in "The Beast", a style he attributes to Masayuki. The green parts of Eva-01's armor were supposed to light up and stand out against the dark sky during the battle against Sachiel; although technically possible, the staff avoided doing so because it would have been costly and labor-intensive. Animation scholar José Andrés Santiago Iglesias noted how during the episode there is a visual juxtaposition between two frames from Shinji's point of view, depicting the ceiling of a hospital and his new room, which consist of a series of still images followed "by a high-speed sequence of different still images played at a rate of one image per frame"; Iglesias cited this directorial device as an example of Evangelion's extensive use of limited animation for artistic purposes. In the hospital scene, where Shinji stands alone in an empty corridor, contrasts of light and shadow were used, keeping the scene monochromatic, to represent Shinji's inner emptiness. Yūko Miyamura, Katsumi Suzuki, Megumi Hayashibara, and Takashi Nagasako voiced unidentified characters in "The Beast", while Nagasako, Suzumi, Motomu Kiyokawa, and Koyasu Takehito voiced the men of the Instrumentality Committee. Besides the original soundtrack, composed by Shirō Sagisu, Gainax also used You are the only one by Kotono Mitsuishi, Misato's voice actress, first released in her image album Lilia ~from Ys~ (1992). British singer Claire Littley sang a cover of "Fly Me to the Moon" named "Normal Version" which was later used as the episode's closing theme song, replaced in late home video editions by a "String Version" sung by the same singer.

== Cultural references ==
The scene where Misato talks about air conditioning in a truck with Ritsuko is a reference to Nadia: The Secret of Blue Water, Gainax's previous work, while the sequence in which Eva-01 is bleeding from the skull is similar to a scene from the Getter Robo manga, of which Anno is a fan. After Sachiel's defeat, Misato watches the battle report on television and remarks how Nerv hides the truth from the general public with a B-22 protocol; Anime Feminist website writer Jeremy Tauber and scholar Laura Montero Plata interpreted this as a reference to the Japanese government's reaction to the Kobe earthquake and the Aum Shinrikyō Tokyo subway sarin attack. Moreover, in the scene where Misato dines with Shinji in the apartment, the staff used the "Gainax bounce", a fan service that made the breasts of the female characters bounce, which Gainax invented and first used in the Daicon III and IV Opening Animations (1981-1983) short films. The city of Tokyo-3 is mentioned in "The Beast" for the first time. Its name is a tribute to the spaceship Tokyo III from the movie Sayonara Jupiter (1984). The scientific concept of phase space is also mentioned in relation to Sachiel's AT Field during Eva-01's battle. Furthermore, the main staff used real brands in "The Beast" scenes to depict a realistic fictional world, including a Mitsubishi Fuso truck, a Sony Digital Audio Tape and Yebisu beer with its logo depicting Ebisu, one of the Seven Lucky Gods. The inclusion of the real-existing Yebisu brand caused troubles during the first airing, so staff changed the name as Yebichu in the on-air version while maintaining Yebisu in the home-video release.

Writer Virginie Nebbia compared Eva-01's jump during its fight against Sachiel with one of the attacks of Ultraman Jack. Writer Alexandre Marine and Japanese reviewer Akio Nagatomi described the outcome of Eva-01's first battle as "very typical Hideaki Anno", noting how the director used "the exact same flashback/exposition technique" in Gunbuster, when Noriko Takaya in a bath recounts her meeting with Coach Ōta with some differences. Dennis Redmond interpreted the last image of the flashback of the battle against Sachiel, in which a close-up of Shinji's eye is visible while the boy screams in terror, as a quotation of "one of the first great video tropes", the close shots of Sally's quivering eye in The Texas Chain Saw Massacre (1974). Virginie Nebbia noted how the image of Eva-01's eye resembles female genitalia, and this detail indicates that Evas are organic and linked with femininity. Nebbia also compared the Signal Termination Plug, which stops an Eva unit, with the Ultra Cross, a cross-shaped weapon from The Return of Ultraman. Alexandre Marine similarly compared Eva-01's close-up to Alfred Hitchcock's directorial style; according to Marine, Eva-01's eye resemblance to human female genitalia emphasizes the theme of motherhood, one of the main ones in the series.

"The Beast" uses religious symbolism, including the Christian cross, for the Misato pendant and the Eva-00 cockpit. Angel Sachiel also explodes in the final scenes of the episode, forming a cross-shaped explosion. An official pamphlet states that the cross has the meaning as a symbol of death and self-sacrifice, although it's not clear which meaning the series follows. For scholars Satoshi Tsukamoto and Adam Barkman the Christian cross symbolism exemplifies Neon Genesis Evangelion's use of "biblical ethos as a dark inspiration for the story". The director of "The Beast", Kazuya Tsurumaki, said in an interview that Christian graphic symbols were used for artistic reasons by the main staff, because they were considered "cool" for the Japanese audience, and they were intended to differentiate Neon Genesis Evangelion from other mecha anime and give it an exotic appeal. Director Anno made similar statements, saying that he wanted to add complicated terms for "pedantry". According to the official booklets and materials, the title "The Beast" can refer to the Angel Sachiel, the berserk Eva-01, or Shinji's hidden destructive impulses. The official encyclopedia Evangelion Chronicle states that the title also references the beast from the Book of Revelation. Virginie Nebbia especially compared Sachiel's cruciform explosion to a scene in Seimei no Ki, the third installment of Daijirō Morohoshi's Yokai Hunter saga, in which Zezu, a "Christ-savior", takes the stricken souls from Hell to Heaven as a giant cross hovers in the sky.

== Themes ==
The episode, which connects directly to the first, has a very different structure from the previous one. According to writer Philip Brophy, the first battle of the series is interrupted before it can truly begin. As noted by scholar Giuseppe Gatti, the battle of Eva-01 in berserk mode is told through Shinji's flashback instead. According to Gatti, the image of Shinji waking up in a hospital bed, a recurring motif in the series and presented for the first time during the episode, could be interpreted as a metaphor for the viewer, who must piece together the pieces and go back and forth to understand the story. "The Beast" follows the main character's stream of consciousness, rather than the linearity of the battle. Shinji deals with her new life with Misato, presented in scenes with humorous tones, and his distant relationship with Gendo, who accidentally mets at Tokyo-3 hospital while he is visiting Rei. The episode's focus is primarily on the psychological analysis of the characters, particularly Misato, and on the dialogues between the main characters. Academic scholar Satoshi Tsukamoto noted in particular how the darkness of the battles is interspersed with moments of comedy, which contribute to making the series more familiar and reassuring for the viewer. Writer Zachary Vereb made a similar observation; according to him, viewers immediately begin to understand how the series features many moments of psychological introspection, and how philosophical reflections are juxtaposed and contrasted with furious mecha battles.

Scholar Susan J. Napier argued that Neon Genesis Evangelion looks like a classic mecha in "its basic plot outlines" but subverts the genre since its first two episodes, which are constructed around "all the conventions of the classic 'saving the world' narrative, only to undermine them". Shinji displays feelings far removed from the stereotypical concept of a hero in "The Beast", showing reluctance and vulnerability in his first battle with an Angel instead. Furthermore, the battle introduces the Evangelions' neural interface system, as Shinji immediately feels the Evangelion's pain as if it were his own body. Gatti argued that this paradox of a mind receiving real sensory signals from a fake body that doesn't belong to it is a common cyberpunk genre narrative trope. According to Claudio Cordella, following the trauma of the battle, Shinji develops a repulsion for the Evangelions; this traumatic experience introduces and anticipates other episodes in the series, which portray the Evangelion units as organic monsters rather than simple robotic machines. Furthermore, the episode, like other episodes in the series, has two different titles; according to scholar Bounthavy Suvilay, the goal is to create an overload of information to trigger a counter-circuit in obsessive anime fans, known as otaku in Japanese, who are known for examining animated sequences frame by frame.

Misato feels guilty for treating Shinji as a mere tool in the episode. For Anime Feminist writers, she experiences ambivalent feelings about using him. In an attempt to convey a sense of family warmth to Shinji, she appears forcibly cheerful, constantly talking and drinking beer all the time; according to writers Álvaro Arbonés and Claudio Cordella, she immediately presents herself as a mother figure to Shinji; Animage compared her with a "big sister" figure instead. Scholar Ida Kirkegaard noted Misato drinks a beer and laughs in one scene, which is later used in the series to "build a sense of familiarty" in order to "set a mood that is, at least on the surface, one of sitcom-like light-heartedness and warmth". Furthermore, throughout the episode, she reflects on herself and expresses her fears that she has revealed too much, that is, that she has revealed the reasons behind her ostentatious exuberance. This has led Newtype magazine to suggest that Misato is wearing several social masks. Furthermore, Shinji observes the rift between Misato's professional demeanor and her slovenly personal habits, since she lives in a chaotic house full of beer cans. AnimeFeminist Jeremy Tauber argued that Misato's apartment shows how the Evangelion world, even "with all of its technological fantasia", is a lost "barren, impoverished landscape". According to Arbonés, it is immediately clear that Misato, beneath her apparent cheerfulness, has a drinking problem. Arbonés also noted how the sequence in which Misato ruffles Shinji's hair during dinner resembles the scene in which the Angel Sachiel grabs Eva-01 by the head. It's left to the viewer to decide whether Shinji has truly discovered Misato's façade, given that in the following scene, while taking a hot bath, Shinji claims that Misato is ultimately a good person. Kazuya Tsurumaki also noticed that Misato talks to Shinji but doesn't enter his room at the end of the episode. He then described Evangelion as a "story of communication" with a message directed to anime fans, which director Anno judged too closed and introverted.

== Reception ==
"The Beast" aired on 11 October 1995 and scored a 5.3% rating of audience share on Japanese TV. It also screened with "Angel Attack" in front of two hundred people at the second Gainax festival on 22 and 23 July 1995 in Itako, Ibaraki, a few months before the airing. According to Gainax co-founder Yasuhiro Takeda, the work received a positive reception. At the 2006 Tokyo International Anime Fair, anime fans voted the first two Evangelion episodes as the anime they would most like to see again. Critics, including Yahoo! Entertainment, Anime News Network, and Newtype magazine, received Neon Genesis Evangelion's first two episodes positively. Protoculture Addicts magazine lauded the animation, soundtrack, and plot. Film School Rejects' Max Covill praised "The Beast" as did animator Yūichirō Oguro, writing for Newtype magazine, who praised its animation. Multiversity Comics' Matthew Garcia similarly lauded the confidence in the filmmaking and the animation of "Angel Attack" and "The Beast", eulogizing the "assurance and tenacity" of Anno and Gainax.

Anime News Network's Kyle Pope said, "The purpose of this episode was to establish the character of Misato which can be summed up in two words: alcoholic slut". The Animé Café's Japanese reviewer Akio Nagatomi criticized "The Beast" mood as "emotionally manipulative", since the viewer is supposed to be sorry for Shinji, but "subtlety seems to be beyond the grasp of the writers". Jane Nagatomi similarly described the story as "fairly weak", criticizing the idea behind the Umbilical Cable but also praising the humour of the scenes involving Pen-Pen. Jack Cameron of Screen Rant regarded Shinji's battle against Sachiel as one of the best Neon Genesis Evangelion fights. Comic Book Resources' editor Ajay Aravind similarly ranked it third among the best battles in the show. SyFy Wire's Daniel Dockery listed it as one of the "most awesome non-depressing" moments in the series, since "there's just something awe-inspiring and terrifying and uncomfortable about watching an uncontrollable Eva unit". Reuben Baron of Comic Book Resources also eulogized the battle, describing it as an example of the "warped brutality of Hideaki Anno's vision". Academic Susan J. Napier noticed the unconventionality of the fight, since Shinji shows reluctance and feelings "that seems less than conventionally heroic", and praised the fight sequence as it ends up "in a fascinatingly low-tech manner", while Ex magazine's Charles McCarter lauded the animation as "nice and clean", the soundtrack and the pace of the first two episodes. Japanese writer Taro Igarashi also praised the scene in which Misato and Shinji see Tokyo-3 skyscrapers emerging from underground as it "impressively introduces" the main setting of the series.

The first scene with Seele inspired a similar scene from the manga Jujutsu Kaisen 0, in which the lead Yuta Okkotsu is questioned by people seeking to control a Curse following him; writer Gege Akutami declared himself a fan of Anno's works. British rock band Fightstar named the song "Unfamiliar Ceilings", contained in the album One Day Son, This Will All Be Yours, after Neon Genesis Evangelion. Sachiel's design inspired Jordan Vogt-Roberts for Kong: Skull Island's Skullcrawler. The scene of Eva-01 going berserk is also referenced in an episode of the US cartoon Invader Zim. Official merchandise based on the episode has also been released, including lighters, T-shirts and reproductions of the battle against Sachiel.
