= Angel Attack =

- Neon Genesis Evangelion episode
- Shinji Ikari (center), Ritsuko Akagi (left) and Misato Katsuragi (right) with the Eva-01's head. The scene is influenced by Combattler V.
- Episode no.: Episode 1
- Directed by: Kazuya Tsurumaki
- Written by: Hideaki Anno
- Story by: Gainax
- Original air date: October 4, 1995
- Running time: 22 minutes

Episode chronology
← Previous —	Next → "The Beast"

"Angel Attack" (Note: Japanese: 使徒、襲来, Hepburn: Shito, Shūrai) is the first episode of the anime series Neon Genesis Evangelion, created by animation studio Gainax. The episode was written by the series director Hideaki Anno and directed by Kazuya Tsurumaki. It was originally aired on TV Tokyo on October 4, 1995. The series is mostly set in the futuristic, fortified city Tokyo-3, fifteen years after a worldwide cataclysm named Second Impact. The protagonist is Shinji Ikari, a teenage boy whose father Gendo has recruited him to the organization Nerv to pilot a giant mecha named Evangelion to combat beings called Angels. In the episode, Tokyo-3 is attacked by the Angel Sachiel, who fights the United Nations Army and the JSSDF. Gendo summons Shinji for the first time, and Shinji reluctantly agrees to pilot the mecha.

Production for "Angel Attack" began in September 1994 and ended in April 1995. Work on this and the series' early episodes took considerably longer than expected, a delay that would later cause scheduling problems for Gainax during the second half of the series. The episode, influenced by Japanese tokusatsu, references other mecha anime series and Gainax's previous works. It scored a 6.8% rating of audience share on Japanese TV and received critical and public acclaim focused on its visuals, direction, and introduction of the characters.

== Plot ==
Gendo Ikari, commander of a special agency named Nerv, summons his son Shinji to the city of Tokyo-3. Sachiel, the third of a series of mysterious enemies known as Angels, approaches a Japanese city underwater as a Japan Strategic Self-Defense Forces tank battalion awaits it on the shoreline. Shinji, who recently arrived in a nearby town, has remained above ground waiting for Misato Katsuragi, head of the military department of Nerv, who is due to pick him up. The Japan Strategic Self-Defense Forces air force begins to attack the Angel with missiles. Shinji is nearly killed in the ensuing battle but is rescued at the last moment by Misato, who arrives in her car.

The Japan Strategic Self-Defense Forces, admitting their ineffectiveness, transfer responsibility for the Angel's destruction to Gendo and Nerv. Elsewhere, Shinji and Misato descend deep underground into a geofront in a car train. Shinji is taken to the hangar of a giant mecha named Evangelion, where he is shown Unit 01, the first test type of the Eva series, as Gendo appears above. Shinji learns he has been summoned to pilot Unit 01 into battle against the Angel. He confronts his father and protests his treatment, believing he has no chance of completing the task, but Gendo tells him to pilot the craft or leave. Shinji initially refuses, and Gendo sends for his other pilot, Rei Ayanami, who is seriously injured. Confronted with the sight of Rei's injuries, Shinji agrees to pilot the Evangelion, which is then launched from the geofront into the path of the Angel on a road on the surface.

== Production ==
Gainax began planning the production of Neon Genesis Evangelion in July 1993. On September 20, the first internal meeting about the new project was held at the studio, but production for the first two episodes did not begin until September 1994, one year after the first meeting, and lasted for months. The production was slow, and, according to Evangelion's director Hideaki Anno, it took six months to complete the script for the first episode. Anno himself wrote the script; he also personally wrote the message on Misato's photograph in his characteristically soft, feminine handwriting. The director set himself the goal of surpassing the first episode of Mobile Suit Gundam; Anno himself and the series' staff admired it so deeply that they knew its shots, scenes, and narrative rhythm by heart. Kazuya Tsurumaki, assistant director of Neon Genesis Evangelion, served as director of "Angel Attack"; Anno and Masayuki, who drew storyboards for the episode, assisted him, while Shunji Suzuki worked as chief animator. Yoshitō Asari, Seiji Kio, and Yuh Imakake worked as assistant character designers. Production also involved animator Mitsuo Iso, who animated the battle between Sachiel and the United Nations aircraft.

Gainax decided the basic plot for "Angel Attack" in 1993, when it wrote a presentation document of Neon Genesis Evangelion titled New Century Evangelion (tentative name) Proposal (新世紀エヴァンゲリオン (仮) 企画書, Shinseiki Evangelion (kari) kikakusho). In the first draft, "Angel Attack" had been named "People's reunion" (再会する人々, Saikai suru hitobito). The Proposal document contained a detailed description of the first episode, which was conceived as a diptych with the second one. The episode would have begun with Shinji on a train, stopped by a battle between Rei Ayanami's Eva-00 and an Angel named Raziel; Raziel, described as a metallic Angel in the Proposal, would have vanished into a lake, with the damaged Unit 00 returning to the Nerv base. The beginning of a battle between Raziel and a berserk Unit 01 was also planned, but it was moved to the second episode. Until shortly before he began drawing the storyboards, Anno had not yet written the line in which Shinji firmly declares that he wants to pilot Eva-01, nor the scene in which he says "I mustn't run away". Unlike Yoshiyuki Tomino, the director of Mobile Suit Victory Gundam, Anno found it difficult to believe that anyone would willingly agree to pilot an Eva without hesitation; looking back, he said that he had made the same mistake as Victory Gundam. In the original script draft, once Shinji realized that he was wanted only because he was useful, he would smile with a hint of self-deprecation and quiet happiness. Furthermore, the staff employed several visual conventions typical of Japanese animation and manga in "Angel Attack"; in one scene from the episode, for example, Misato makes cartoonish expressions of surprise.

From the very first episode, the entire staff worked under intense pressure and struggled to keep up with the production schedule. By the time the series began airing with "Angel Attack", Gainax had completed only twelve episodes after nearly two years of production, leaving the studio to produce the remaining fourteen in roughly one-third of that time. This compressed schedule ultimately led to the severe production problems that affected the second half of the series. According to animator Shunji Suzuki, animating the episode also took several months. Production of "Angel Attack" officially ended in April 1995; one month later, the second episode was also completed. The dubbing sessions began on March 27, about six months before the series debut. The episodes were later screened in front of two hundred people at the second Gainax festival on 22 and 23 July 1995 in Itako, Ibaraki, a few months before their official broadcast. According to Gainax co-founder Yasuhiro Takeda, the work was still at an early stage, since "the opening sequence as well as other elements weren't quite ready yet, so the screening showed only the raw episodes". Miki Nagasawa, Megumi Hayashibara, Akiko Hiramatsu, Takehito Koyasu, and Takashi Nagasako played several announcements and unnamed characters in "Angel Attack", while Tomomichi Nishimura, Hidenari Ugaki, and Hiroshi Naka voiced the three soldiers who speak with Gendo in the first scenes. British singer Claire Littley also sang a cover of "Fly Me to the Moon" which was later used as the episode's closing theme song.

== Cultural references and themes ==
I wonder if a person over the age of twenty who likes robot anime and bishōjo anime is really happy. If this person doesn't know that greater happiness exists even until he died, he is probably happy. Regrettably, I have my doubts about his happiness. As I was making this work I wanted to try to consider what in the world could the 'happiness' of such a person be?

— Hideaki Anno during the production of the first two episodes

Gualtiero Cannarsi, who curated the first Italian adaptation of the series, noted that "Angel Attack" story starts in medias res, a narrative technique used in the following episodes of the anime by which, by means of flashbacks or the speeches and thoughts of the characters, what happened before the beginning of the narrative is reconstructed. He also noted that Shinji pronounces the phrase "I mustn't run away" in one scene of the episode, which later becomes one of the most typical of the character. Hiroki Azuma, a Japanese philosopher and cultural critic, speaking of his motto "I mustn't run away", described Evangelion as a story that depicts "anxiety without a cause", linking this feeling to the social repercussions in Japan after the Aum Shinrikyō Tokyo subway sarin attack. The sentence is inspired by the personal experience of Hideaki Anno, who felt "completely destroyed" after his work on Nadia: The Secret of Blue Water; he faced a hard time in the four years before the series' release and then returned to work on anime with the same idea. For Yasuhiro Takeda, a member of the Gainax studio, "what we saw in Evangelion was maybe just a reflection of those feelings". For the phrase "I mustn't run away", according to Takeda, the director took inspiration from an old failed Gainax project, Blue Uru, a sequel to the Royal Space Force: The Wings of Honnêamise (1987) movie. The series reprises this theme in the final episode. After discussing it with the series' character designer, Yoshiyuki Sadamoto, Anno added the line, "You can run away". According to Anno, the series does not argue that people should never run away, because running away is not always wrong. Instead, he criticized those who remain trapped in indecision over whether to flee, leaving themselves in a state akin to death, rather than those who escape genuinely unbearable situations.

According to writer Álvaro Arbonés, Neon Genesis Evangelion looks like a normal anime series in the first episode. The official series encyclopedia Evangelion Chronicle noted that the cheerful, catchy music accompanying the scene in which Shinji first sees Nerv headquarters evokes the atmosphere of an optimistic science fiction film depicting a bright future. Scholar Susan J. Napier similarly argued that Evangelion is a classic mecha in "its basic plot outlines" but subverts the genre since its first episode, which is constructed around "all the conventions of the classic 'saving the world' narrative, only to undermine them". "Angel Attack" also presents the show's major themes, including the father-son relationships and interpersonal communication. Yūichirō Oguro, editor of extra materials from the home video editions of the series, noted how Misato tells Shinji to act like a man in "Angel Attack", a theme also presented later in the series. According to an official booklet on the anime, it is unclear if the series supports the patriarchal model of masculinity or discusses its value instead. Claudio Cordella emphasized how his father doesn't care for Shinji, who is instead immediately put under psychological pressure. According to Anime Feminist, Shinji then feels betrayed when Misato also asks him to board. Scholar Nikolai Afanasov also noted that Shinji receives a letter containing an erotic photograph and a provocative note from Misato; thus, "the traditional strategy of sexualizing female characters to attract the attention of an adolescent male audience is fully present in the early stages". Scholar Álvaro Arbonés and critic Vrai Kaiser described Misato's picture as a simple example of fan service. Writer Andrew M. Winters has linked erotic tones in Shinji and Misato's interaction in "Angel Attack" to the series finale, in which Misato tries to spur Shinji to fight by kissing him and promising him sexual intercourse in her final scene.

According to scholar Betty Stojnic, Evangelion graphically depicts a family triad from the very beginning, represented by son Shinji, his mother Eva-01, and his father Gendo; Shinji "can only look on helplessly at the distant, authoritative silhouette of his father and the larger-than-life representation of his mother". Eva-01, in particular, raises its arm and protects Shinji; Claudio Cordella linked this moment to the fact that the soul of the boy's mother is inside Unit 01. During his reunion with his father, Shinji is positioned in front of the Eva's face, while his father appears higher up in the background. Furthermore, according to writer Bounthavy Suvilay, Gendo's face is hidden behind glasses that reflect the screens showing his son's face; Gendo is also often shown with his face partially covered by his clasped hands. This directorial choice, according to scholar William Routt, represents a graphic metaphor for his position of authority and the fact that Gendo does not reveal his feelings or intentions. Álvaro Arbonés similarly noted that Gendo seems to look at something viewers can't observe. Arbonés and writer Zachary Vereb also noted how "Angel Attack" immediately makes it clear that Shinji and Rei are both mere tools for Gendo. For scholar Andrew M. Winters, Shinji is "presented with choices that are not of his own design". Despite his initial refusal, Shinji eventually agrees to pilot Eva-01. Scholar Yuuki Namba thus argued that Shinji, contrary to what is commonly associated with his character, "isn't inherently weak-willed, but brave". The book Hideaki Anno Schizo Evangelion wrote that, "Moved by Rei's determination to stand despite her shoulders trembling with pain, Shinji finally gets into the Eva". For scholar Giuseppe Gatti, Shinji's role seems to allegorize the spectator's serial experience of Evangelion: not and "never fully aware of the details of the storyworld".

The episode presents references to earlier anime works, including Lupin III, Combattler V and GunBuster. Akio Jissōji's directorial style particularly informed the installment, along with shots influenced by the tokusatsu genre. Furthermore, staff used humorous graphic symbols that are typical of shōjo anime, drawing inspiration from the works of Kunihiko Ikuhara. In the first scenes, Japanese Defence forces attack Sachiel with missiles using a technique similar to the Itano Circus from Macross, a series Anno and other future Gainax members worked on as animators before Evangelion. "Angel Attack" also depicts existing military vehicles, including Japanese Type 74 tanks, Yak-38-inspired VTOLs, nacelle-less gyroplanes and M270 MLRS missile launchers. According to scholar Philip Brophy, the episode's first minutes are "a dense map of generic quotations of Japanese scifi tropes", taking in kaijū films like Godzilla, Ultra Q, Mazinger Z, Yamato, and Gundam. Brophy also noted the battle scenes "look and sound like television hot-spot reportage from the Gulf War to the USSR dissolution to the Afghanistan Civil War". Writer Virginie Nebbia interpreted an image from the episode representing Shinji's hand covered in blood as a reference to Jushin Liger. According to Nebbia, a similar image can also be found in Osamu Dezaki's anime Dear Brother, from which Evangelion borrows various techniques and symbols, including trains and electric poles.

The episode's first half, characterized by summery scenery and the constant sound of cicadas in the background, contrasts sharply with the much faster pace of the second half; Shinji himself is taken aback by the sudden succession of events. Moreover, in one of the first scenes, Shinji sees a ghost of Rei Ayanami in a deserted city near Tokyo-3. The Rei visible in the sequence is not the real Rei; the appearance has been connected to the scenario of the film The End of Evangelion, released in 1997 as a conclusion to the classic series. During the film, all forms of life come together in one being during the Instrumentality; human beings, shortly before dying, see Rei's ghosts appear, guiding them in the process as "messengers of redemption". According to Oguro, the Rei's ghost Shinji sees on the avenue is "the existence that gazes upon man", and the scene symbolizes that "Shinji is protected by his mother since the beginning of the series". Japanese anime magazine Newtype also wrote that the deserted city with Rei "seems to allude to the future interior landscape of Shinji and director [Anno]". Virginie Nebbia compared Rei's ghost to Arthur C. Clarke's novel Childhood's End; in the novel, the Overlord aliens explain to humans that time is more complex than what human science perceives and that humans actually invented the classical image of Christian demons, the Overlords themselves, as a future memory from the last years of the human race. According to Nebbia, Rei "appeared to Shinji from The End of Evangelion before becoming a God". Nebbia also noted how in Kihachi Okamoto's movie Blue Christmas (1978), Okamoto uses almost subliminal fast cuts that evoke Rei's ghost appearance.

== Reception ==
First episodes can make or break a series. Few anime premieres do a better job of setting up the players and crisis than Evangelion's opening episode. ... Evangelion is a rush of drama and excitement right from the start with the end of the world scenario and the "special" child who must save the world, making for an especially lovely touch.

— Max Covill (Film School Rejects)

The episode received critical and public acclaim. Gainax premiered "Angel Attack", along with the second episode, in a preview at the second Gainax festival on July 22 and 23, 1995, receiving a positive reception. The episode was first broadcast on October 4, 1995, and scored a 6.8% rating of audience share on Japanese television. After the series' first run, it ranked seventeenth among the best anime episodes of the moment in an Animage magazine Grand Prix poll. The scene in which Shinji meets Rei Ayanami for the first time also ranked sixteenth in a survey by TV Asahi about the best anime scenes. At the 2006 Tokyo International Anime Fair, anime fans voted the first two Neon Genesis Evangelion episodes as the anime they would most like to see again.

Critics, including animator Yūichirō Oguro writing for Newtype magazine, Screen Rant, Animedia and Anime News Network's Nick Creamer, appreciated the episode's direction and editing. Academic Susan J. Napier described the depiction of Shinji's and Misato's "inner world" in "Angel Attack" as an example of the series' unconventionality. Italian writer and critic Andrea Fontana wrote, "From the first episode, every detail [in Neon Genesis Evangelion] overflows with many meanings". Comic Book Resources criticized the depiction of the futuristic scenario, but defended Shinji and his reluctance to face the task of protecting humanity in "Angel Attack" from some criticisms made by animation enthusiasts. Kristy Anderson, writing for the Supanova Expo website, picked his decision to ride Eva-01 as one of the character's best moments. Film School Rejects' Max Covill similarly placed "Angel Attack" third among the best Neon Genesis Evangelion episodes, praising it for its visuals and introduction of mysteries of the series; he also lauded one shot of Shinji reading a book with the hand of an Evangelion in the background, listing it among the "perfect shots" of the series.

The Animé Café's Japanese reviewer Akio Nagatomi described the animation as "average" for a TV serial and praised "some interesting creature and mecha design", but also criticized the premise of the story of a young boy who fights alien beings as excessively derivative. The December 1995 issue of Newtype magazine lauded the series' realism and dense amount of information. SyFy Wire's Daniel Dockery described Sachiel's debut as "terrifying", but considered it reminiscent of "a bunch of giant monster tropes". Newtype wrote, "there are many elaborate camera angles that appeal to fans" and "the slightly unusual subtitles and the eye-catch screens are also strong points". Protoculture Addicts magazine lauded the animation, soundtrack, and story. Multiversity Comics' Matthew Garcia similarly praised the confidence in the filmmaking and the animation of "Angel Attack" and "The Beast", eulogizing the "assurance and tenacity" of Anno and Gainax. Ex magazine's Charles McCarter lauded the animation as "nice and clean", the soundtrack, and the pace of the first two episodes. According to the Newtype's official Evangelion film books, the scene in which Gendo takes command of the battle against Sachiel also received a positive reception for its "expressiveness", being "considered one of the best-executed of this episode".

Kinoko Nasu, writer of Mahōtsukai no Yoru and Fate/stay night, began his career as a writer after seeing "Angel Attack", an episode that according to him "can't have been ignored by neither I nor my contemporaries". Official merchandise based on the installment has been released, including lighters, T-shirts, and reproductions of the battle against Sachiel. In 2022, Bandai Spirits released an Ichiban Kuji Evangelion-themed lottery titled "Angel Attack", featuring figures of Eva-01, Sachiel, and Pen-Pen among its prizes.
