= Parerga and Paralipomena =

1851 German-language essay collection by Schopenhauer

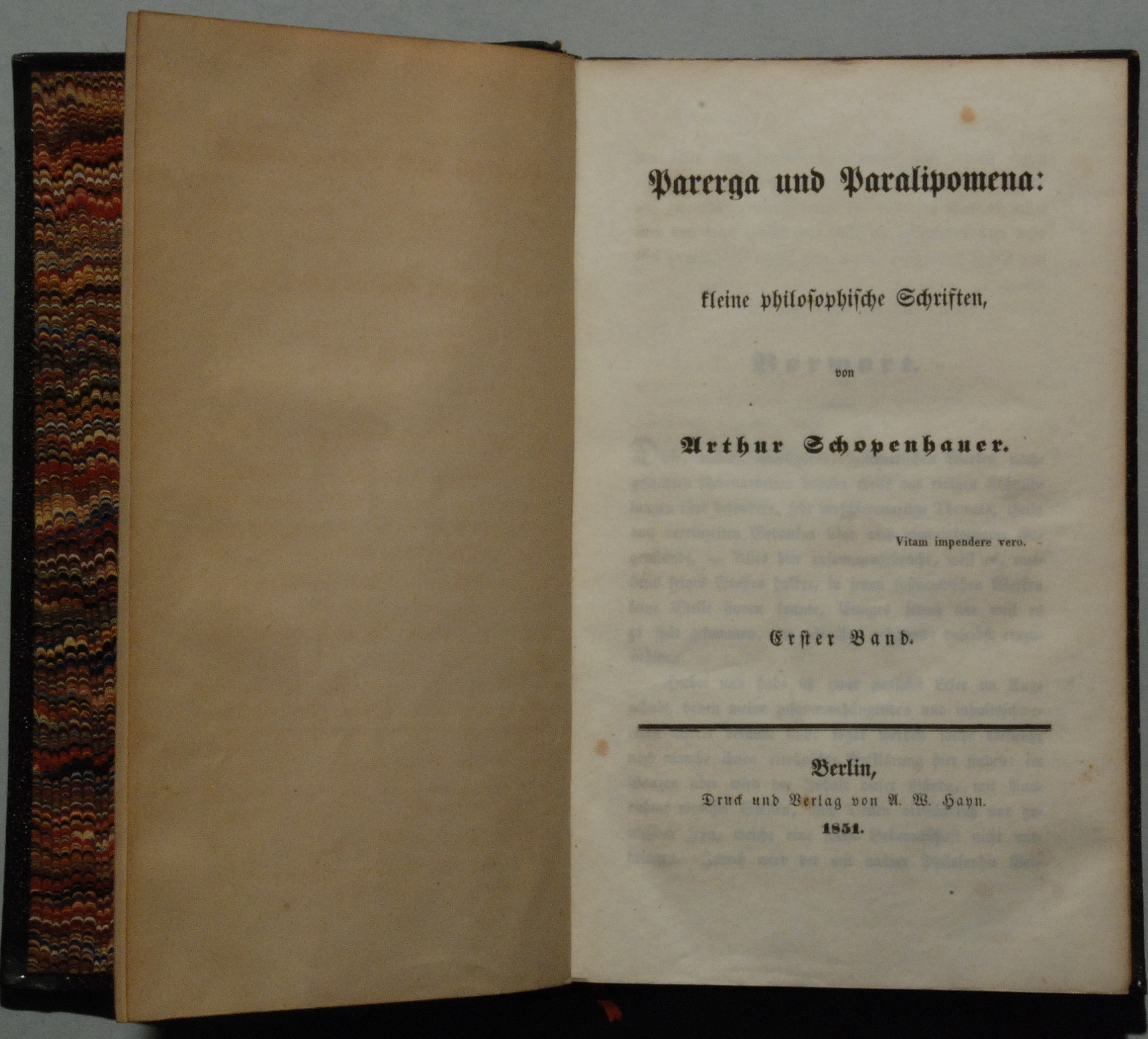
German original edition, 1851

Parerga and Paralipomena (Greek for "Appendices" and "Omissions", respectively; German: Parerga und Paralipomena) is a collection of philosophical reflections by Arthur Schopenhauer published in 1851. The selection was compiled not as a summation of or introduction to Schopenhauer's philosophy, but as augmentary readings for those who had already embraced it, although the author maintained it would be comprehensible and of interest to the uninitiated nevertheless. The collection is divided into two volumes, covering first the parerga and thereafter the paralipomena to that philosophy. The parerga are six extended essays intended as supplementary to the author's thought. The paralipomena, shorter elaborations divided by topic into thirty-one subheadings, cover material hitherto unaddressed by the philosopher but deemed by him to be complementary to the parerga.

== Contents ==
Volume One (Parerga)

- Preface
- Sketch of a History of the Doctrine of the Ideal and the Real
- Fragments for the History of Philosophy
- On Philosophy at the Universities
- Transcendent Speculation on the Apparent Deliberateness in the Fate of the Individual
- Essay on Spirit Seeing and everything connected therewith
- Aphorisms on the Wisdom of Life:
  - Fundamental division
  - What a Man is
  - What a Man has
  - What a Man represents
  - Counsels and Maxims
  - On the Different Periods of Life

Volume Two (Paralipomena)

Stray yet Systematically Arranged Thoughts on a Variety of Subjects:

- On Philosophy and its Method
- On Logic and Dialectic^{1}
- Ideas concerning the Intellect generally and in all Respects
- Some Observations on the Antithesis of the Thing-in-itself and the Phenomenon
- A few Words on Pantheism
- On Philosophy and Natural Science
- On the Theory of Colours
- On Ethics
- On Jurisprudence and Politics
- On the Doctrine of the Indestructibility of our True Nature by Death
- Additional Remarks on the Doctrine of the Vanity of Existence
- Additional Remarks on the Doctrine of the Suffering of the World
- On Suicide
- Additional Remarks on the Doctrine of the Affirmation and Denial of the Will-to-Live
- On Religion
- Some Remarks on Sanskrit Literature
- Some Archaeological Observations
- Some Mythological Observations
- On the Metaphysics of the Beautiful and Aesthetics
- On Judgement, Criticism, Approbation, and Fame
- On Learning and the Learned
- On Thinking for Oneself
- On Authorship and Style
- On Reading and Books
- On Language and Words
- Psychological Remarks
- On Women
- On Education
- On Physiognomy
- On Din and Noise
- Similes, Parables, and Fables^{2}

^{1} includes an introduction to The Art of Being Right, Schopenhauer's posthumously published discourse on rhetoric.
^{2} describes the hedgehog's dilemma, an analogy about the challenges of human intimacy.

== Publication ==
In light of the unenthusiastic reception of the philosopher's earlier publications, publishers were reluctant to commit to this, his last major work. It was only after significant difficulty and through the persuasion of the philosopher's disciple Julius Frauenstädt that Hayn of Berlin consented to publish the two volumes in a print run of 750 copies—with an honorarium of only ten copies for its author.

Parerga and Paralipomena drew the attention of John Oxenford, a noted observer and translator of German literary culture, who contributed a favourable, albeit anonymous, review of the work for the English quarterly journal Westminster Review in 1852. The following year, Oxenford would write for the journal an article on Schopenhauer's philosophy entitled "Iconoclasm in German Philosophy", which, translated into German and printed in the Vossische Zeitung would spark immediate interest of Schopenhauer's work in Germany and propel the obscure figure to lasting philosophical prominence. In the following years, Schopenhauer succeeded in publishing new editions of all his previous work on the strength of the revived interest, although his plans for a revised edition of Parerga and Paralipomena were stymied by the deterioration of his health in the months preceding his death in 1860.

== Style and influence ==
The subject matter and stylistic arrangement of the paralipomena were significant influences on the work of philosopher and psychologist Paul Rée, and through him most notably the philosopher Friedrich Nietzsche, whose later work explores—following Schopenhauer—the relation of man to himself, the universe, the state, and women through the art of aphorism.
