= The Artifice =

Online visual arts magazine

- Categories: Visual arts
- Frequency: Daily
- Publisher: The Artifice
- Founder: Misagh Alami
- Founded: October 17, 2009
- First issue: 2009
- Company: The Artifice
- Based in: Sweden
- Language: American English
- Website: the-artifice.com

The Artifice is an independent long-form online magazine that focuses on visual arts and other "unique topics." The website is collaboratively built and maintained by writers, with all articles peer-reviewed by other writers, with discussions about various types of visual media. The platform is open to any writer, and it works with WordPress.

The site offers in-depth articles in the field of film, literature, anime, manga, comics, games, television, arts, animation, and the craft of writing. The content is not in the style of academic essays, nor personal blogs, it is somewhere in between these two.

== History and profile ==
The Artifice was founded in October 2009 by Misagh Alami. In 2014 and 2015, they connected with University of Florida and George Mason University regarding contributors to the magazine. Around the same time, the Reed College Linguistics Department, and Rowan University shared promotional messages while the department of Savannah College of Art and Design encouraged students to write for the publication. Marymount Manhattan College highlighted a student published in the magazine, while Villanova's English Department, University of New England, and University of Massachusetts Amherst Art Department, encouraged their students to write for it.

The magazine has a network of spin-off sites, currently including a comprehensive database and community for abridged series named Abridged Series, a Reddit-style platform (Animefice) focusing on anime and manga, sections entitled Gamefice and Screenfice focusing on gaming culture, film, and television. and vTubie, a platform for Virtual YouTubers (VTubers).

== Writing process ==
The model of the writing process is divided into three major processes: Planning, Writing, and Reviewing. The Artifice is designed to encourage collaboration between writers on each phase. To help writers find a good topic to explore, the platform offers Topics. With this feature, writers can explore user submitted topics and also make their own topic suggestions. Once an article has been submitted for review, it will be available for processing by upper-tier writers who can provide helpful feedback to improve the content.

The peer-reviewed editorial system is in place to make sure published articles contain high-quality content, formatting unity, and professional credibility.

Once a writer gets published, they gain the ability to process submissions, work in collaboration with prospective writers, and thus decide what type of material meets their own standards.

== Readership ==
The magazine's audience has grown rapidly since its inception. As of September 2020, it is estimated to be read by an audience of millions, having more than 3,500,000 followers on Facebook alone.

The majority of their audience are from English-speaking countries, with the United States, United Kingdom, Australia, and Canada at the very top.

Currently, the Pennsylvania State University, University of Chicago, University of British Columbia, Ohio State University, University of California, Irvine, Purdue University, University of Arizona, University of Waterloo, Australian National University, and many others promote The Artifice as a writing opportunity for students, staff, and faculty. A variety of other academic institutions recommend The Artifice to their students, faculty, and staff, including Art Academy of Cincinnati, Belmont University, Brandeis University, Boston University, California State University, Northridge, Edgewood College, University of Massachusetts Boston, St. John's College, and Washington and Lee University.

Otherwise, Concordia University, Emily Carr University of Art and Design, University of Manitoba, York University, Flinders University, Macquarie University, and Goldsmiths, University of London also recommended it.

== Content ==
The magazine's content features a variety of topics within the arts spectrum. This includes deep dives into artists and franchises like J.R.R. Tolkien, Harry Potter, Star Wars, Disney, and H.P. Lovecraft, with everything from the humanitarian topics gender roles, identity, feminism, racism, LGBT+, to concepts like fandom, morality, fairy tales, adaptation, superheroes, otaku, and science fiction.
