= Hedgehog's dilemma =

Metaphor about the challenges of human intimacy

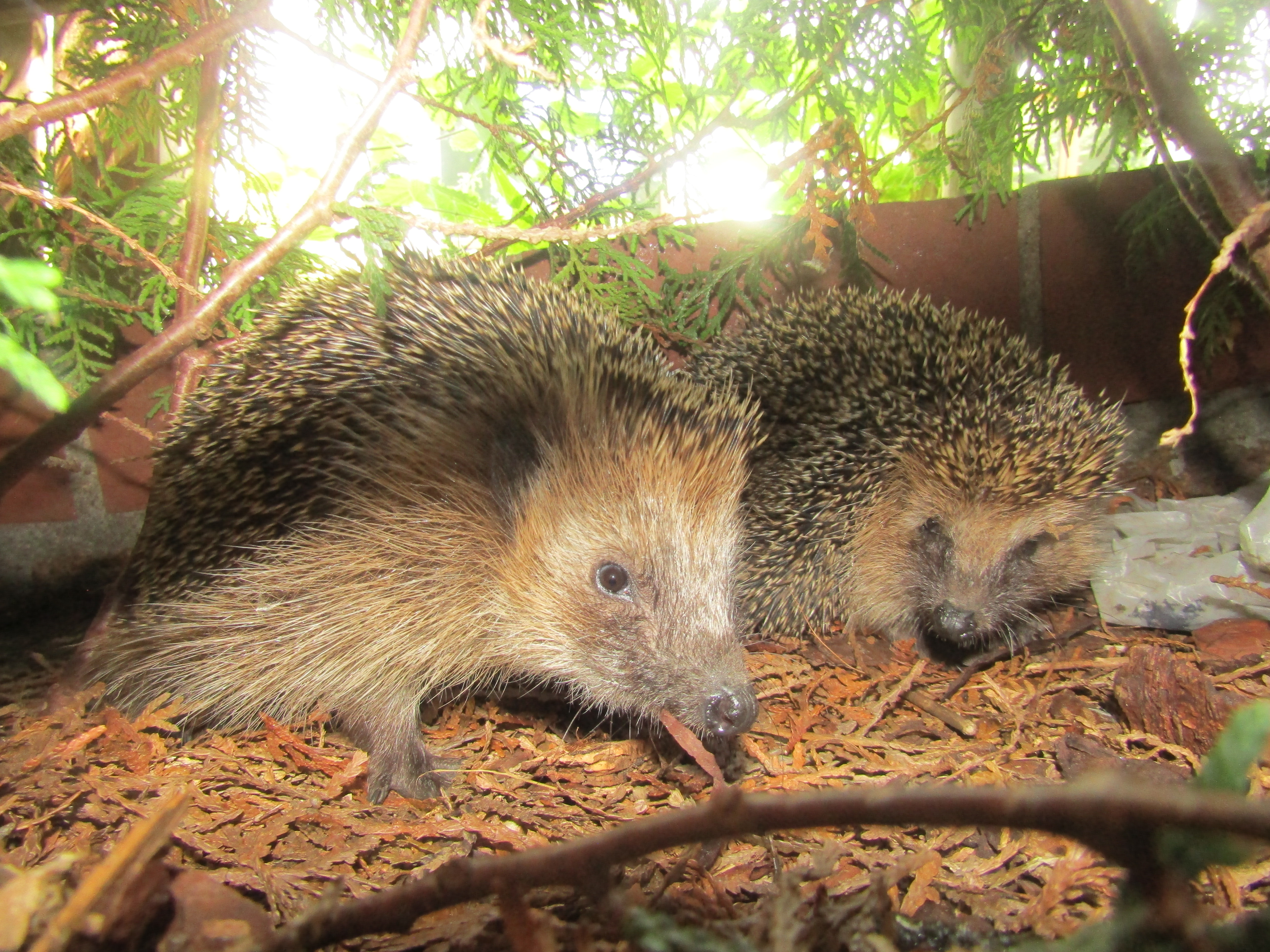
Two European hedgehogs

The hedgehog's dilemma, or sometimes the porcupine dilemma, is a metaphor about the challenges of human intimacy. It describes a situation in which a group of hedgehogs seek to move close to one another to share heat during cold weather. They must remain apart, however, in order to avoid hurting one another with their sharp spines. Though they all share the intention of a close reciprocal relationship, this cannot occur, for reasons they cannot avoid.

Arthur Schopenhauer conceived this metaphor for the state of the individual in society. Despite goodwill, humans cannot be intimate without the risk of mutual harm, leading to cautious and tentative relationships. It could be seen as wise to be guarded with others for fear of getting hurt and also fear of causing hurt; however, this may lead to unsatisfying relationships. The dilemma may encourage self-imposed isolation.

== Schopenhauer ==
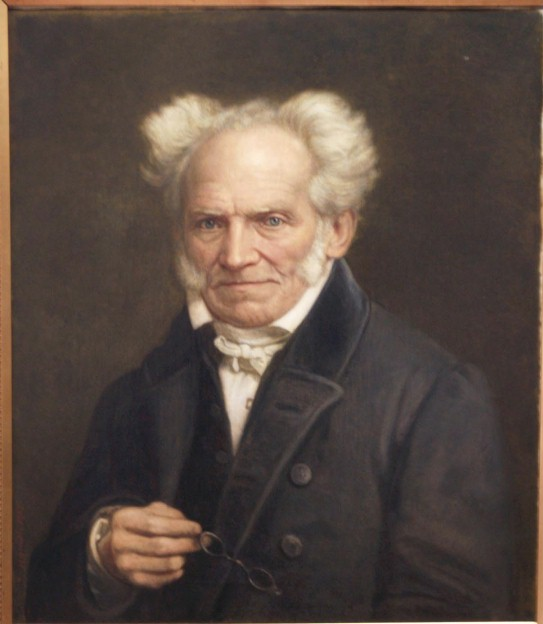
Schopenhauer published the first description of the porcupines' dilemma in 1851.

The concept originates in the following parable from the German philosopher Schopenhauer:

One cold winter's day, a number of porcupines huddled together quite closely in order through their mutual warmth to prevent themselves from being frozen. But they soon felt the effect of their quills on one another, which made them again move apart. Now when the need for warmth once more brought them together, the drawback of the quills was repeated so that they were tossed between two evils, until they had discovered the proper distance from which they could best tolerate one another. Thus the need for society which springs from the emptiness and monotony of men's lives, drives them together; but their many unpleasant and repulsive qualities and insufferable drawbacks once more drive them apart. The mean distance which they finally discover, and which enables them to endure being together, is politeness and good manners. Whoever does not keep to this, is told in England to ‘keep his distance’. By virtue thereof, it is true that the need for mutual warmth will be only imperfectly satisfied, but on the other hand, the prick of the quills will not be felt. Yet whoever has a great deal of internal warmth of his own will prefer to keep away from society in order to avoid giving or receiving trouble or annoyance.

— Schopenhauer (1851) Parerga and Paralipomena

== Freud ==
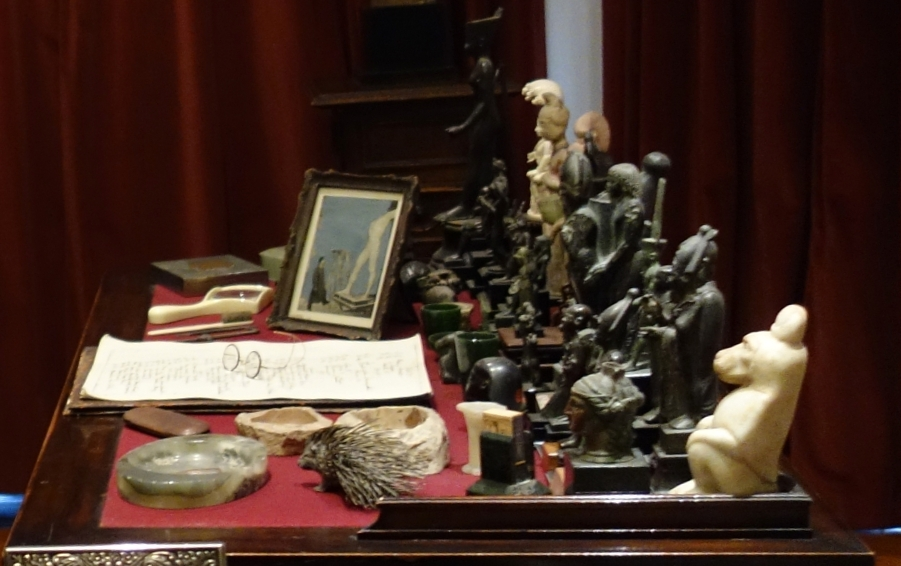
The porcupine on Freud’s desk in the study of his London home, now the Freud Museum.

It entered the realm of psychology after the tale was discovered and adopted by Sigmund Freud. Schopenhauer's tale was quoted by Freud in a footnote to his 1921 work Group Psychology and the Analysis of the Ego (German: Massenpsychologie und Ich-Analyse). Freud stated, of his trip to the United States in 1909: "I am going to the USA to catch sight of a wild porcupine and to give some lectures."

== Social psychological research ==
The dilemma has received empirical attention within the contemporary psychological sciences. Jon Maner and his colleagues (Nathan DeWall, Roy Baumeister, and Mark Schaller) referred to Schopenhauer's "porcupine problem" when interpreting results from experiments examining how people respond to ostracism. The study showed that participants who experienced social exclusion were more likely to seek out new social bonds with others.

== See also ==
- List of paradoxes
- Social isolation
