= Animedia =

Anime magazine

- Cover of the June 2024 issue, featuring Seishirō Nagi and Reo Mikage of Blue Lock: Episode Nagi
- Categories: Anime
- Frequency: Monthly
- Publisher: IID
- First issue: 1981
- Country: Japan
- Language: Japanese
- Website: cho-animedia.jp

Animedia (アニメディア, Animedia) is a Japanese monthly anime magazine by IID. Animedia was first published on June 9, 1981 and is one of the best-selling anime magazines in Japan.

== Overview ==
Animedia was first published on June 9, 1981, by Gakken Holdings (currently IID). The magazine provides news and information on the anime industry, including cast and staff listings, broadcast schedules, and exclusive features and interviews. Along with Animage and Newtype, it is one of the top three anime magazines and one of the top 10 best-selling anime magazines in Japan.

== Acquisition ==
IID, the media company that runs the Anime! Anime! and Anime! Anime! Biz news websites, has announced its acquisition of Animedia and its sister magazine Seiyū Animedia from Gakken Plus publisher. IID also acquired the other irregularly published "mooks" (magazine books) and the Chō! Animedia website from Gakken Plus.

== Annual awards ==
Anime Character Awards:

This contest is held every year in the February issue. Characters from anime broadcast over the previous year are ranked in various simple categories (such as "cool" or "dumb") as voted on by readers. For many years, the poll results were shown in the beginning of the magazine, but they were not included in the February 2011 and 2012 issues.

Top 10 Most Popular TV Anime:

This project was done most years from 1984 to 2008 in the February issue's "10 Greatest Anime News", but in 2009 it was published in the January issue's supplementary notebook along with "Major News".

Readers' Choice for the Best Anime of All Time:

This is an annual poll of the best anime works and characters of all time, held in the July issue (the anniversary issue). It was usually shown at the beginning of the magazine, but for the July issues of 2010, 2013, and 2014, it was not. In addition to male and female character categories, there used to be a category for other "best of" characters ("best nonhuman character").
