= Yūichirō Oguro =

Japanese screenwriter

Yūichirō Oguro (小黒 祐一郎, Oguro Yūichirō; born May 1, 1964) is a Japanese writer. He co-created the 1997 television anime series Revolutionary Girl Utena and its 1999 film sequel Adolescence of Utena as a member of the production group Be-Papas. He is also the editor-in-chief of the digital magazine Anime Style.

During his amateur days, he was a regular at Manga Garō, a coffee shop in Ekoda frequented by anime fans.

He is primarily involved in editing anime magazines, planning, and scriptwriting, and is known by the nickname "Anime-sama." His pseudonyms include Satsuki Hajime (五月 はじめ) and Ogikubo Nana (荻窪 七).

== Works ==
=== Magazines ===
- Animage – "I want to talk to this person" feature (November 1998 issue–present) (Tokuma Shoten)
- Bijutsu Techō special issue – Anime Style (Bijutsu Shuppan-sha)
- Monthly Anime Style (Style)
- Anime Style (Media Pal Mook)
- Comic Newtype (Kadokawa Shoten)

=== Television ===
- Dragon Ball (1988) – Script (as Satsuki Hajime)
- Shin Bikkuriman (1989) – Script (as Satsuki Hajime)
- Revolutionary Girl Utena (1997) – Planning
- Cyber Team in Akihabara (1998) – Planning support
- Gekiganger III (1998) – Script
- Doki Doki School Hours (2004) – Publicity support
- Kemonozume (2006) – Planning support, literature management, script (as Ogikubo Nana)
- Zoku Sayonara Zetsubou-Sensei (2008) – Series composition, adaptation
- Hanamaru Kindergarten (2010) – Series composition, script

=== Film ===
- Martian Successor Nadesico: The Motion Picture – Prince of Darkness (1998) – Head of publicity
- Adolescence of Utena (1999) – Planning
- Cyber Team in Akihabara: Summer Vacation of 2011 (1999) – Head of publicity
- In This Corner of the World (2016) – Special thanks

=== OVA ===
- Doki Doki School Hours Gold (2004) – Publicity support

=== Video packaging ===
- Neon Genesis Evangelion (1995) – LaserDisc cover structuring, writing
- Revolutionary Girl Utena (1997) – LaserDisc cover and liner notes structuring, writing
