= List of Neon Genesis Evangelion episodes =

Neon Genesis Evangelion is an anime series produced by Gainax and Tatsunoko Production and directed by Hideaki Anno. It began broadcasting in Japan on TV Tokyo on October 4, 1995, and ended on March 27, 1996. Evangelion is an apocalyptic storyline set in the mecha genre. It centers on a teenage boy recruited by a paramilitary organization named Nerv to control a giant cyborg called an Evangelion to fight monstrous beings known as Angels. The show takes place largely in a futuristic Tokyo years after a worldwide catastrophe. Parts of the series also focus on other Evangelion pilots and members of Nerv as they try to prevent another catastrophe. Installments of the show have been through various re-cuts and cosmetic revisions.

== Broadcast history ==
After several episodes were produced, the first episode aired on October 4, 1995, long after originally planned. Initially ignored (although received positively by those Gainax fans invited to early screenings), viewership grew slowly and largely through word of mouth.

The 16th episode marked a distinct shift to a more introspective, less action-focused tone that would come to characterize the second half of Evangelion. This change in emphasis was partly due to the intended development of the story, but also partly because by this point, production was running increasingly behind schedule; episode director Kazuya Tsurumaki identifies this as the impetus for Evangelion's turn into internal conflict:

I didn't mind it. The schedule was an utter disaster and the number of cels plummeted, so there were some places where unfortunately the quality suffered. However, the tension of the staff as we all became more desperate and frenzied certainly showed up in the film ... About the time that the production system was completely falling apart, there were some opinions to the effect that, "If we can't do satisfactory work, then what's the point of continuing?" However, I didn't feel that way. My opinion was, "Why don't we show them the entire process including our breakdown."

Despite this, by the 18th episode, the series had become enough of a sensation that Eva-01's violent rampage "[was] criticized as being unsuitable on an anime show that is viewed by children", and the 20th episode would be similarly criticized for the offscreen depiction of characters Misato and Kaji having sex. With this popularity came the first home media merchandise, "Genesis 0:1", containing the first two episodes on VHS and LaserDisc. Beginning a trend, it sold out. When the series finale aired, the plot apparently remained unresolved: the Human Instrumentality Project had reached its final phase, but the last two episodes focus entirely on the internal psychology of the characters, leaving deeply unclear what actually happens in the world of the series narratively. A feature film was created as a complementary, alternate ending to the original episodes 25 and 26 and released in three stages: first as a preview (Neon Genesis Evangelion: Death & Rebirth), then as the completed alternate ending (The End of Evangelion), then finally as a theatrical revival combining the two into one presentation (Revival of Evangelion). On home video, Episodes 21–24 of the television series were eventually re-edited with extended and new scenes to set up the events of the alternate ending.

The series saw its original English dub premiere in Australia on SBS in 1999. The series aired in the United States for the first time English subbed on San Francisco–area PBS member station, superstation KTEH (now KQEH) on March 5, 2000, as part of its Sunday late-prime sci-fi programming line-up. The first two episodes saw its nationwide broadcast English dubbed on Cartoon Network as part of its Toonami programming block's Giant Robot Week on February 24–25, 2003; both episodes were heavily edited for content. About three years later, the full series aired almost entirely unedited on Cartoon Network's Adult Swim from October 21, 2005, to April 14, 2006.

== Episodes ==
Each episode has two titles: one is the original Japanese title, and the second is an English title that was chosen by Japanese studio Gainax itself and appears as an eye catch. Most often, the official English title is not a direct translation of the Japanese title. For example, the direct translation of the Japanese title of episode 2 is "Unfamiliar Ceilings", but the English title is "The Beast". Sometimes, however, the two titles are either similar or exactly the same, as was the case with the first episode "Angel Attack". The 2019 Netflix release uses a direct translation of the Japanese titles, which are those shown below.

Many tracks on the original soundtracks are named after the English episode names in which they are first used, or vice versa.

No.	Japanese title	English title	Directed by	Written by	Storyboard by	Original release date	American release date
1	"Angel Attack"; Transliteration: "Shito, shūrai" (Japanese: 使徒、襲来)	"Angel Attack"	Kazuya Tsurumaki	Hideaki Anno	Hideaki Anno Masayuki	October 4, 1995	October 21, 2005
In 2000, the first disastrous contact with the mysterious beings known as Angels resulted in the global cataclysm referred to as the Second Impact, which wiped out half of the human race. To defend humanity against future Angel attacks, the United Nations established the Nerv organization in Tokyo-3 to develop giant bio-mechanical mecha known as Evangelions. Fifteen years later, the Angels have finally returned, and the untested Evangelions can only be piloted by specially selected 14-year-olds. Shinji Ikari, estranged son of the director of Nerv commander Gendo Ikari, arrives in Tokyo-3 and is dragooned into piloting Evangelion Unit 01 to fight the Angel, Sachiel, which is attacking the city.
2	"Unfamiliar Ceilings"; Transliteration: "Mishiranu, tenjō" (Japanese: 見知らぬ、天井)	"The Beast"	Kazuya Tsurumaki	Hideaki Anno Yōji Enokido	Hideaki Anno Masayuki	October 11, 1995	October 28, 2005
Shinji wakes up in the hospital, unable to remember the fight against the Angel the night before. Gendo wants nothing to do with him, so Nerv's head of operations, the young and attractive Captain Misato Katsuragi, becomes his legal guardian. Settling into life in Misato's apartment, he eventually recalls the furious battle.
3	"The Silent Phone"; Transliteration: "Naranai, denwa" (Japanese: 鳴らない、電話)	"A Transfer"	Hiroyuki Ishidō	Hideaki Anno Akio Satsukawa	Kazuya Tsurumaki Hiroyuki Ishidō	October 18, 1995	November 4, 2005
Shinji begins school at Tokyo-3 and meets classmates Toji Suzuhara, Kensuke Aida, and Hikari Horaki. Toji resents Shinji because his sister was badly injured in Shinji's first fight against the Angel Sachiel. Another Angel, Shamshel, appears, and Shinji must defeat it. Shinji is pushed to his mental limit during the battle, going berserk during the last seconds, engaging the Angel in close combat and savagely disabling it. Afterwards, he is devastated by the emotions he experienced during the battle. Toji, witnessing the toll Shinji's life as a pilot puts on him, decides to let go of his resentment.
4	"Rain, After Running Away"; Transliteration: "Ame, nigedashita ato" (Japanese: 雨、逃げ出した後)	"Hedgehog's Dilemma"	Tsuyoshi Kaga	Akio Satsukawa	Jun'ichi Satō	October 25, 1995	November 11, 2005
Overstressed from being made an Evangelion pilot, the previous fight with Shamshel, and fighting with Misato, Shinji runs away from home, soon encountering Kensuke in a field. Shinji is soon recaptured by Nerv and reluctantly accepts to resume piloting EVA Unit 01, but Misato states that if he cannot have the right attitude then he should quit being a pilot. She forces his resignation, and after saying goodbye to his classmates Shinji prepares to leave Tokyo-3 by train. However, at the last minute both Shinji and Misato have an epiphany that gives them a deeper understanding of each other. Shinji does not board his train to leave Tokyo-3 and decides to stay. Misato welcomes him back.
5	"Rei, Beyond the Heart"; Transliteration: "Rei, kokoro no mukō ni" (Japanese: レイ、心のむこうに)	"Rei I"	Keiichi Sugiyama	Hideaki Anno Akio Satsukawa	Jun'ichi Satō	November 1, 1995	November 18, 2005
Evangelion Unit 00 is finally repaired after it went berserk during the experiment it was in before the events of the first episode. Shinji tries to get to know the pilot of Unit 00, Rei Ayanami, better but finds that she is incredibly insular, has no friends, and records of her past have been erased. A new and powerful Angel arrives: Ramiel, a floating monolithic metal diamond with a powerful particle beam blast which nearly kills Shinji in Unit 01.
6	"Showdown in Tokyo-3"; Transliteration: "Kessen, daisan shin Tōkyō-shi" (Japanese: 決戦、第3新東京市)	"Rei II"	Hiroyuki Ishidō	Hideaki Anno Akio Satsukawa	Masayuki	November 8, 1995	November 25, 2005
The Angel Ramiel is boring down through the upper layers of Tokyo-3 to reach Nerv headquarters in the geofront below. Possessing a strong beam attack and the strongest AT field ever observed, a direct assault by an Evangelion would meet with failure. A plan ("Operation Yashima") is devised in which Shinji in Unit 01 will use an advanced prototype positron rifle to shoot Ramiel from outside its target zone, which must use the entire electrical output of Japan in order to operate, while Rei in Unit 00 shields Unit 01. Shinji's first shot misses while Ramiel retaliates with its energy beam, but Rei steps in front of Unit 01 to shield him. The shield is quickly worn down by the Angel's attack, and Shinji just barely manages to fire the second shot in time, destroying the Angel as Unit 00 is almost destroyed. He then comes out of his Evangelion to open the hatch to Rei's, finding her alive and crying with relief. When Rei shows her confusion at not knowing how to respond, Shinji just tells her to try smiling.
7	"The Works of Man"; Transliteration: "Hito no tsukurishimono" (Japanese: 人の造りしもの)	"A Human Work"	Keiichi Sugiyama	Hideaki Anno Yōji Enokido	Keiichi Sugiyama Hideaki Anno	November 15, 1995	December 2, 2005
Dr. Ritsuko Akagi, Nerv's chief scientist, explains to Shinji more of the classified real nature of Second Impact, the Angels, and the mission of the Evangelions to defeat them. A rival organization of Nerv builds a prototype giant robot, Jet Alone, meant as an alternative to the Evangelions, which this new robot line will supersede. Unlike the Evangelion units, which rely on external or limited battery power, the Jet Alone has an on-board nuclear reactor and can thus function indefinitely without external power. However, during the first public test of Jet Alone, it goes out of control and starts marching toward a nearby city with its reactor building to a meltdown. Shinji keeps the robot at bay in his Evangelion while Misato gets inside and attempts to shut down the reactor, only to find out that the apparent threat of a meltdown was staged by an act of sabotage. After everything is said and done, Ritsuko and Gendo discuss the fate of Jet Alone, revealing that they were behind the sabotage.
8	"Asuka Arrives in Japan"; Transliteration: "Asuka, rainichi" (Japanese: アスカ、来日)	"Asuka Strikes!"	Kazuya Tsurumaki	Hideaki Anno Yōji Enokido	Shinji Higuchi	November 22, 1995	December 9, 2005
Misato brings Shinji and his friends Toji and Kensuke on a flight to a United Nations carrier battlegroup which is transporting Evangelion Unit 02 and its fiery German-American pilot, Asuka Langley Soryu, to Japan. Escorting Asuka to Japan is Misato's old boyfriend, Ryōji Kaji. In the middle of some awkward introductions and reunions, a massive aquatic Angel, Gaghiel, begins attacking the fleet, and Asuka determines that she will fight it using Unit 02, by playing "hopscotch". However, for both due to their unfriendly meeting, she takes Shinji with her. The Angel drags Unit 02 underwater, and Misato devises a plan to kill it by lodging two sunken battleships in its mouth and then firing all weapons into it. By cooperating, Asuka and Shinji pull off the plan and the Angel is killed, and it is revealed that both Shinji and Asuka broke their synchronization records. Kaji is seen delivering Adam to Gendo, and Asuka transfers to Shinji's class.
9	"Mind, Matching, Moment"; Transliteration: "Shunkan, kokoro, kasanete" (Japanese: 瞬間、心、重ねて)	"Both of You, Dance Like You Want to Win!"	Seiji Mizushima	Hideaki Anno Akio Satsukawa	Shinji Higuchi	November 29, 1995	December 16, 2005
Asuka moves into Shinji and Misato's apartment where he and Misato live. As Asuka adjusts to Japan, the Angel Israfel attacks. After apparently being defeated, Israfel splits into two identical copies and defeats both Units 01 and 02. In desperation the UN takes the drastic step of dropping an N² bomb on the Angel, temporarily disabling it and giving Nerv six days to find a way to defeat it. They determine that both parts of the Angel must be defeated perfectly simultaneously, so on Kaji's suggestion, Misato puts Shinji and Asuka in a training regimen which has them spending as much time together as possible in order to synchronize their actions to pull off a coordinated dual attack set to a timed dance routine. Asuka and Shinji do not take well to such close conditions however, and the training is almost deemed a failure. Nevertheless, Shinji and Asuka eventually learn to put aside their differences and are able to pull off the routine almost flawlessly, destroying the Angel.
10	"Magmadiver"; Transliteration: "Magumadaibā" (Japanese: マグマダイバー)	"Magmadiver"	Tsuyoshi Kaga Hiroyuki Ishidō	Hideaki Anno Akio Satsukawa	Tsuyoshi Kaga Hideaki Anno	December 6, 1995	December 23, 2005
The Evangelion pilots (save for Rei) are excited about their upcoming class trip to Okinawa, but they are upset to learn that they cannot leave Tokyo-3, since they have to be on standby in case of an Angel attack. A dormant Angel, Sandalphon, is discovered in an embryonic stage nesting deep in the magma of an active volcano, and in the hopes of gaining greater insight into the Angels, Asuka is sent to capture it by lowering Unit 02 into the magma, while it wears a special giant coolant suit for protection. However, the Angel soon awakes and advances beyond its embryonic stage, forcing Asuka to battle Sandalphon while deep beneath the surface of the magma. Asuka defeats the Angel, but almost dies when Unit 02's protective equipment fails after suffering damage during the battle. Shinji, however, jumps to her rescue at the last moment.
11	"In the Still Darkness"; Transliteration: "Seishishita yami no naka de" (Japanese: 静止した闇の中で)	"The Day Tokyo-3 Stood Still"	Tetsuya Watanabe	Hideaki Anno Yōji Enokido	Masayuki	December 13, 1995	December 30, 2005
The electrical power in Tokyo-3 is completely cut off as a result of sabotage by parties unknown, trapping most Nerv personnel inside, and worse, trapping all three Evangelion pilots outside of the base. A new Angel, Matarael, appears and begins to burn its way down to Nerv headquarters by using a corrosive acid attack, and everyone inside must struggle to power up the Evangelions, as the pilots try to make their way back into Central Dogma through a maze of closed corridors and air ducts. The pilots then enter their Evas and go into battle. After traversing more vents and passageways, they come face to face with the Angel. Asuka defends Shinji and Rei from Matarael's corrosive acid, while the other two pilots retrieve Shinji's rifle. Shinji then uses the rifle to destroy the Angel.
12	"The Value of Miracles"; Transliteration: "Kiseki no kachi wa" (Japanese: 奇跡の価値は)	"She said, 'Don't make others suffer for your personal hatred.'"	Hiroyuki Ishidō	Hideaki Anno Akio Satsukawa	Masayuki	December 20, 1995	January 6, 2006
While Gendo and Fuyutsuki are out on a mission to Antarctica, a massive Angel, Sahaquiel, appears in Earth's orbit, well beyond the reach of the Evangelions, and launching several N² bombs at it has no effect. The Angel attacks by dropping small pieces of itself onto Earth below, calibrating its aim: once it has zeroed in on Tokyo-3, the main body of Sahaquiel will fall to Earth in a massive kamikaze attack to destroy Tokyo-3. All three Evangelions are deployed at once in a race to reach the Angel before it hits, hold it back by projecting their own AT fields, and destroy it. The operation is a success, and Shinji, much to his own surprise, receives words of praise from Gendo for his efforts. Shinji realizes that getting praise from his father might be his main motivation for being a pilot.
13	"Angel Infiltration"; Transliteration: "Shito, shinnyū" (Japanese: 使徒、侵入)	"Lilliputian Hitcher"	Tensai Okamura	Hideaki Anno Mitsuo Iso	Tensai Okamura	December 27, 1995	January 13, 2006
The pilots are undergoing a synchronization test directed by Ritsuko deep within Nerv headquarters when a new Angel, Ireul, appears within the base itself, being initially mistaken for corrosion. This Angel is actually a collection of millions of microscopic organisms, which interact to create a living biological computer circuit. Ireul infects Nerv's computer network, and then infiltrates two of the three Magi supercomputers that control the base before Ritsuko is able to set up a firewall to slow its advance. Ritsuko comes up with a scheme to use the Angel's rapid adaptive ability against it and force it to evolve into a benign state, but must race to implement the program before the Angel gains control of the base's self-destruct. After successfully pulling off the plan and destroying the Angel, Ritsuko gives Misato some insight about the Magi's workings, relaying the story of how her mother based its design on her own personality.
14	"Seele, the Seat of the Soul"; Transliteration: "Zēre, tamashii no za" (Japanese: ゼーレ、魂の座)	"Weaving a Story"	Masahiko Otsuka Ken Andō	Hideaki Anno	Hideaki Anno	January 3, 1996	January 20, 2006
The first half of this episode is a clip show, in the form of a report by Seele reviewing Gendo's actions, summarizing the first season of episodes and the story up until this point. In the second half, Ritsuko conducts an experiment to determine if pilots can be switched between the Evangelions they normally pilot. Rei can synchronize with Unit 01 fairly well, but when Shinji attempts to synchronize with Unit 00, it goes violently berserk inside of the base, in a manner identical to the failed activation test that took place before Shinji's arrival in Tokyo-3. As before, Unit 00 attacks the hangar's observation booth, smashing the window. However, Rei was standing at the window instead of Gendo, as was the case in the first test, causing Misato Katsuragi to wonder if Unit 00 was trying to kill Rei. Meanwhile, Ritsuko feels that Unit 00 was trying to attack Ritsuko herself. At the end of the episode, Rei uses Unit 00 to bring the Lance of Longinus recovered from Antarctica to the deepest level of Nerv's base, Terminal Dogma.
15	"Lies and Silence"; Transliteration: "Uso to chinmoku" (Japanese: 嘘と沈黙)	"Those women longed for the touch of others' lips, and thus invited their kisses."	Naoyasu Habu	Hideaki Anno Akio Satsukawa	Jun'ichi Satō	January 10, 1996	January 27, 2006
Kaji begins to make clandestine investigations into Nerv's dark secrets, after which he, Misato, and Ritsuko attend a wedding. Meanwhile, Rei and Shinji stay after class to clean up while Asuka is set up on a blind date by Hikari. Shinji meets Gendo at his mother's grave. Later that night, at Misato's apartment, Asuka kisses Shinji, which nearly suffocates him. Misato and Kaji end up rekindling their old romance, but she also discovers he is a double agent, sent as a spy by the Japanese government. Kaji, in turn, reveals to her that Nerv is hiding things from her. He shows her what he believes to be Adam, the first Angel, which is being kept deep underneath Nerv headquarters.
16	"The sickness unto death, and then..." Transliteration: "Shi ni itaru yamai, soshite" (Japanese: 死に至る病、そして)	"Splitting of the Breast"	Kazuya Tsurumaki	Hideaki Anno Hiroshi Yamaguchi	Kazuya Tsurumaki	January 17, 1996	February 3, 2006
A new and extremely bizarre Angel, Leliel, appears in the sky over Tokyo-3, apparently a black and white sphere. All three Evangelions move in to attack, but Shinji's attack is useless, and he along with Unit 01 are absorbed into a growing shadow that has engulfed the city. Ritsuko determines that Leliel exists on a higher dimension of existence, which can only be explained by mathematical concepts. The shadow on the ground, described as being 600 meters wide but only three nanometers thick, is the actual body of the Angel, and the sphere in the sky is its true shadow. Fearing that Unit 01 has been completely lost, Nerv prepares to drop all of its remaining N² bombs into the Angel, hoping that this will destroy Leliel even though it could easily kill Shinji as well. While trapped in Leliel, Shinji goes on an introspective mental journey. As the battery power completely drains and life support runs out in Unit 01, Shinji suddenly feels a ghostly woman embracing him, and he realizes that she is his mother. Outside Leliel, Misato and Ritsuko witness Unit 01 violently tear its way out of Leliel's shadow, thereby killing the Angel. Shinji is recovered alive and well, but his experiences inside the Angel have left him deeply unsettled.
17	"The Fourth to be Qualified"; Transliteration: "Yoninme no tekikakusha" (Japanese: 四人目の適格者)	"Fourth Children (Note: According to ADV co-founder Matt Greenfield at the 2011 Sydney Supanova Pop Culture Expo, Gainax, who titled the English episodes, kept insisting on calling an individual Evangelion pilot a "children", as Japanese has no plural to differentiate one from several if a number is not stated. Greenfield says the English team kept correcting it as "child" and that they "eventually won" with their version of the word. Khara's translation for the 2019 Netflix English release includes Gainax's original choice of "children".)"	Minoru Ōhara	Hideaki Anno Shinji Higuchi	Akira Oguro	January 24, 1996	February 10, 2006
Disaster strikes unexpectedly when Nerv-02, Nerv's second branch base in Nevada, mysteriously disappears in a flash, resulting in the loss of everything in a radius of eighty-nine kilometers and thousands of people. The incident coincided with an experiment to install an S² engine, capable of giving an Evangelion an unlimited power supply, into Evangelion Unit 04, one of the two new Evangelions which have recently finished construction in the United States. Panicking after the accident involving Unit 04, the United States government demands that Evangelion Unit 03, built in Nerv-01, Nerv's first branch base in Massachusetts, be removed from its soil as quickly as possible. As Unit 03 is about to arrive in Tokyo-3, Toji Suzuhara becomes the new pilot for it.
18	"Life and Death Decisions"; Transliteration: "Inochi no sentaku o" (Japanese: 命の選択を)	"Ambivalence"	Tensai Okamura	Hideaki Anno Shinji Higuchi	Tensai Okamura	January 31, 1996	February 17, 2006
Unit 03, being transported from the United States to Japan via airplane, flies through a microscopic Angel disguised as an odd cloud, infecting Unit 03. During Toji's first synch test, Unit 03 goes berserk and mutates into the Angel Bardiel. Possessing both the power of an Angel and the form of an Evangelion, Unit 03 destroys the test facility and advances toward Tokyo-3. All three Evangelions are sortied against Bardiel, but the Angel rapidly defeats both Unit 02 and Unit 00. Although Shinji does not know that Toji is trapped inside Bardiel, he refuses to use Unit 01 to attack it, wanting to try to save the pilot. As Unit 03 attacks Unit 01, Gendo orders that Shinji be cut off from control of Unit 01 and that Unit 01's dummy plug autopilot system be activated. Under the control of the dummy plug, Unit 01 savagely attacks Bardiel, tearing the possessed Evangelion to shreds and crushing its entry plug. After the battle, the already emotionally devastated Shinji is even more horrified as he sees Toji being taken from the wreckage of the entry plug.
19	"A Man's Battle"; Transliteration: "Otoko no tatakai" (Japanese: 男の戰い)	"Introjection"	Masayuki	Hideaki Anno Akio Satsukawa	Masayuki	February 7, 1996	February 24, 2006
Shinji, horrified and emotionally devastated by the battle between Unit 01 and Bardiel and witnessing Toji's near-death, as well as Gendo's indifference to the situation, quits Nerv for a second time. However, as he is leaving Tokyo-3, the Angel Zeruel appears and easily defeats the other Evangelions. After speaking with Kaji, who reveals the truth as to why the Evas are necessary to combat the Angels, namely to prevent them from making contact with Adam and thereby trigger the Third Impact which will result in the annihilation of mankind, Shinji returns to Nerv just before the Angel penetrates Nerv headquarters and engages the Angel in Unit 01. The Angel succeeds in overpowering Unit 01 as its batteries expire and blasts away the Evangelion's chest armor, revealing a core identical to those of the Angels. As the Angel attacks Unit 01's core, Shinji pleads with the Evangelion to start working again. Unit 01 goes "berserk", re-engages and defeats the Angel, and then tears apart and eats the Angel's corpse, absorbing its S² engine in the process.
20	"Of the Shape of Hearts and Humans"; Transliteration: "Kokoro no katachi, hito no katachi" (Japanese: 心のかたち 人のかたち)	"Weaving a Story 2: oral stage"	Masahiko Ōtsuka	Hideaki Anno	Kazuya Tsurumaki Hideaki Anno	February 14, 1996	March 3, 2006
During the climax of the massive fight against the Angel Zeruel, Shinji achieved an over 400% synchronization ratio with Unit 01, a level thought impossible. However, because of this, Shinji has merged with the Evangelion, and his body has reverted to LCL inside the entry plug. Over the course of thirty days, as Unit 01 stands immobile in its hangar, Ritsuko struggles to come up with a way to restore Shinji. Meanwhile, Shinji's consciousness goes on an introspective odyssey while merged with Unit 01 in which he comes into contact with the soul of his mother, Yui Ikari. After speaking with Yui, Shinji is "reborn" from Unit 01's exposed core. Later that evening, Misato and Kaji resume their love affair. During their meeting, Kaji gives her a chip which details all his findings from spying on Nerv, telling her it might be his last gift to her.
21 21'	"The Birth of Nerv"; Transliteration: "Nerufu, tanjō" (Japanese: ネルフ、誕生)	"He was aware that he was still a child."	Hiroyuki Ishidō (21) Masahiko Ōtsuka, Shunji Suzuki (21')	Hideaki Anno Akio Satsukawa	Jun'ichi Satō	February 21, 1996	March 10, 2006
Deputy Commander Kozo Fuyutsuki is kidnapped and interrogated by Seele, who are outraged that in its last battle Unit 01 absorbed the S² engine from an Angel into its body, so that it no longer requires an external power source and can now function indefinitely. Meanwhile, Kaji goes AWOL to try to find out the truth about Nerv. As Fuyutsuki is interrogated by Seele, he recounts in flashbacks how he first met Gendo and Yui, the dark events surrounding Second Impact, and how Nerv and the Evangelion project were born. Flashbacks also reveal the history of Misato, Ritsuko, and Rei. Fuyutsuki is rescued by Kaji, and Fuyutsuki warns him that Seele will want him dead now. That evening, Kaji is shot by an unseen assassin. Misato receives a voicemail from Kaji, in which he urges her to continue his search for the truth about Nerv, and from its nature she deduces that he is dead and breaks down in grief.
22 22'	"Staying Human"; Transliteration: "Semete, ningen rashiku" (Japanese: せめて、人間らしく)	"Don't Be"	Akira Takamura (22) Kazuya Tsurumaki (22')	Hideaki Anno Hiroshi Yamaguchi	Kazuya Tsurumaki	February 28, 1996	March 17, 2006
After being defeated yet again by an Angel, Asuka's synchronization ratio continues to drop, affecting her ability to pilot Unit 02. Flashbacks reveal Asuka's tragic childhood, which shaped her current abrasive personality. A new Angel, Arael, appears in Earth's orbit, well outside the range of any Earth-based weaponry, including the Evangelions. Asuka is told that she will be Rei's backup for the confrontation with the Angel. Infuriated, she launches herself and confronts Arael on her own. However Arael uses a telepathic attack which forces Asuka to relive traumatic events from her past, causing such mental distress that Asuka completely loses synchronization and Unit 02 shuts down. Gendo orders Rei to retrieve the Lance of Longinus and then use it against the Angel. The Lance succeeds in penetrating Arael's AT field and destroys it, but the Lance achieves escape velocity and enters a lunar orbit. Asuka is again angered by her defeat, worsened by her hatred of Rei.
23 23'	"Tears"; Transliteration: "Namida" (Japanese: 涙)	"Rei III"	Shōichi Masuo	Hideaki Anno Hiroshi Yamaguchi	Kazuya Tsurumaki Hideaki Anno	March 6, 1996	March 24, 2006
Following the last Angel's assault on her mind, Asuka sinks into clinical depression. The next Angel, Armisael, attacks, and attempts to merge itself with Unit 00, causing it to make contact with Rei's mind, as past Angels did with Shinji and Asuka. In order to save Shinji, Rei self-destructs Unit 00 in order to destroy Armisael. Rei is revealed to be "recovered" after a supposed near-death experience. Seele, wanting to get to the bottom of the incident, subjects Ritsuko to a humiliating interrogation with Gendo's consent. Wanting revenge on Gendo, Ritsuko betrays him by revealing several dark truths to Shinji and Misato about the Evangelions and Rei, particularity that soulless clones of the latter form the cores of the dummy plugs. In her anger at Gendo, Ritsuko destroys all the Rei clones.
24 24'	"The Final Messenger"; Transliteration: "Saigo no shisha" (Japanese: 最後のシ者)	"The Beginning and the End, or 'Knockin' on Heaven's Door'"	Masayuki	Hideaki Anno Akio Satsukawa	Masayuki	March 13, 1996	March 31, 2006
As Asuka's depression has grown to the point that she is reduced to catatonia, she runs away from home only to be found by Nerv agents in an abandoned house sitting naked in a bathtub. Seele sends Kaworu Nagisa to Nerv in order to be the replacement pilot for Unit 02. At first Shinji and Kaworu bond and quickly become friends. However, it is soon revealed that Kaworu is in fact the final Angel, Tabris, and has been sent to merge with Adam in Terminal Dogma at the bottom level of Nerv headquarters. Kaworu commandeers Unit 02, and Shinji engages it with Unit 01 in a fierce fight while in free-fall as they descend to Terminal Dogma. Kaworu reaches the Angel in Terminal Dogma as Shinji defeats Unit 02, but realizes that the Angel is not Adam but Lilith. Realizing it is the way things are meant to be, he then implores Shinji to kill him to prevent humanity from being destroyed. Shinji hesitates, but finally kills Kaworu. Later, traumatized by the day's events, Shinji tries to talk to Misato, but she is too distracted by her own struggles to be of comfort to him.
25	"The Ending World"; Transliteration: "Owaru sekai" (Japanese: 終わる世界)	"Do you love me?"	Kazuya Tsurumaki	Hideaki Anno	Kazuya Tsurumaki Hideaki Anno	March 20, 1996	April 7, 2006
The Human Instrumentality Project begins, merging the souls of mankind into a single entity. Shinji, Rei, Misato, and Asuka struggle with their reasons for existence. Shinji discovers that he has created a solitary existence for himself, a world in which he alone can exist.
26	"The Beast That Shouted 'I' at the Heart of the World (Note: Alternatively translated as "The Beast That Shouted 'Love' at the Heart of the World", in reference to Harlan Ellison's book and short story of the same name; the katakana word アイ (ai) is deliberately ambiguous as to whether it is the transliteration of the first-person singular pronoun "I" or the Japanese word for love (愛, ai).)" Transliteration: "Sekai no chūshin de "ai" o sakenda kemono" (Japanese: 世界の中心でアイを叫んだけもの)	“Take care of yourself."	Masayuki Kazuya Tsurumaki	Hideaki Anno	Masayuki Kazuya Tsurumaki Hideaki Anno	March 27, 1996	April 14, 2006
The Human Instrumentality Project continues as mankind attempts to complete its existence. Shinji continues to struggle with the impact of his personal existence, and eventually views a world (resembling a light-hearted, comedic high school setting) in which he is not an Evangelion pilot. Shinji, now understanding that his existence is not fixed, destroys the constrictive shell which he had formed around himself. He is met by all of the other characters from the series, who applaud and congratulate him, and, in response, he thanks them all.

=== Complementary ending ===
The complementary ending to Neon Genesis Evangelion is first teased in Rebirth, the second half of the theatrical presentation Neon Genesis Evangelion: Death & Rebirth. Rebirth comprises the unfinished first twenty-five minutes of Episode 25' and ends as the Mass Production Evangelions, under the control of Seele, sortie to combat Asuka, under command of Nerv. The full ending, split into two 45-minute episodes, 25' and 26', is shown in the theatrical film The End of Evangelion. These episodes were presented separately and with minor cosmetic differences on early home video releases.

No.	Japanese title	English title	Directed by	Written by	Storyboard by	Original theatrical release date
25'	"Air"; Transliteration: "Ea" (Japanese: エア)	"Love is destructive."	Kazuya Tsurumaki	Hideaki Anno	Masayuki Shinji Higuchi Kazuya Tsurumaki	March 25, 1997 (Rebirth); July 19, 1997 (End of Evangelion)
With the Angels defeated, Commander Gendo Ikari and Seele finally break their relationship and Gendo attempts to start Third Impact with Rei and the Angel Lilith in Terminal Dogma. Seele orders the Japanese Strategic Self Defense Forces (JSSDF) to attack Tokyo-3 and Nerv headquarters, eventually leading to Tokyo-3's destruction with an N² mine. Asuka, realizing that her mother's soul was watching over her inside Unit 02 all along, manages to synch up again with the Evangelion and repulses the JSSDF's attack on Nerv, prompting Seele to retaliate by sending in the nine Mass Production (MP) Evangelions, Units 05 through 13, to fight Unit 02. Meanwhile, Misato rescues Shinji from advancing JSSDF troops and brings him safely to Unit 01, but is mortally wounded. Ritsuko tries to initiate Nerv HQ's self-destruct as an act of petty revenge against Gendo, but it fails due to her mother's programming, at which point Gendo kills her. In a tough battle, Asuka is able to defeat the MP Evangelions, but Unit 02's batteries run out, and the MP Evangelions reactivate despite their wounds because they are fitted with S² engines. The MP Evangelions proceed to brutally eviscerate Unit 02. Shinji leaves the Geofront in Unit 01, but upon seeing the remains of Unit 02, he has a massive mental breakdown.
26'	"Sincerely Yours (Note: Alternatively translated as "My Purest Heart for You" – in reference to the Japanese title of the 1968 film Charly – or with the additional bracketed title, "My Purest Heart for You (Sincerely Yours)".)"; Transliteration: "Magokoro o, kimi ni" (Japanese: まごころを、君に)	"I need you."	Hideaki Anno	Hideaki Anno	Hideaki Anno Shinji Higuchi Jun'ichi Satō	July 19, 1997
Gendo starts Third Impact with Rei, but feeling Shinji's anguish, she rejects Gendo and merges with Lilith to become a god-like being. The MP Evangelions crucify Unit 01 with their Lance of Longinus replicas, and centering around the Rei/Lilith being, create an Anti-AT field which spreads over the entire world, reducing everyone to the primordial soup of LCL, merging into a single super-being as all souls merge. In a surreal sequence (in which Shinji imagines himself in different scenarios interacting with the people he has come to know and care about during his time as an Eva pilot), Shinji examines his life's meaning with Rei and what he truly wants, and after talking with the soul of his mother in Unit 01, decides to reject Instrumentality, accepting individual existence and the possibility of pain over the painless loss of identity. He is told all living things will have the choice of returning to individual existence if they can remember it. The Rei/Lilith being and the MP Evangelions decompose. In the end, Shinji wakes up on the beach of the Sea of LCL, which has formed over Earth, and finds that Asuka is lying next to him, inexplicably alive, her injuries sustained during her battle with the Mass-Produced Evas covered in bandages. Shinji, still in an emotionally fragile state, straddles the seemingly unresponsive Asuka and attempts to strangle her, but stops himself when she raises her hand to his face and caresses it. At Asuka's action, Shinji comes to his senses and breaks down in tears.

== Reception ==
While the entire series has received wide attention, individual episodes have also earned praise and occasionally been recipients of awards. For instance, in the 19th Annual Anime Grand Prix, a readers' choice award hosted by Animage magazine, seventeen episodes of Evangelion gained enough votes to be included among the one hundred "Best Loved Single Episodes". Episodes 24 and 26 took first and second place respectively with roughly six hundred votes each.

== See also ==
- List of Neon Genesis Evangelion films
- List of Neon Genesis Evangelion chapters
