= Fourth Children =

- Neon Genesis Evangelion episode
- The Dummy Plug implant with Rei Ayanami
- Episode no.: Episode 17
- Directed by: Minoru Ohara
- Written by: Hideaki Anno, Shinji Higuchi
- Original air date: January 24, 1996
- Running time: 22 minutes

Episode chronology
← Previous "Splitting of the Breast"	Next → "Ambivalence"

"Fourth Children" (Note: Japanese: 四人目の適格者, Hepburn: Yoninme no tekikakusha; lit. 'The Fourth to be Qualified') is the seventeenth episode of the Japanese anime television series Neon Genesis Evangelion. Hideaki Anno and Shinji Higuchi wrote the episode, while Minoru Ohara worked as director. The series' protagonist is Shinji Ikari, a teenage boy whose father Gendo recruited him to the special military organization Nerv to pilot a gigantic, biomechanical mecha named Evangelion into combat with Angels. In the episode, mecha Eva-04 and Nerv's Second American Division disappear, while Toji Suzuhara is selected as the pilot of Eva-03. Hikari Horaki, class leader of Toji and Shinji's class, asks Toji to prepare something for him to eat.

"Fourth Children" has references to scientific and religious concepts such as nucleotide bases, apoptosis, the Dirac sea, the God Marduk, and crucifixion. Writer Shinji Higuchi was inspired by the Ultraman franchise, conceiving the episode as the "calm before the storm" of the following episode, "Ambivalence". Higuchi also wanted to portray Hikari's feelings for Toji to emphasize the tragedy in "Ambivalence", in which Toji is injured during battle before Hikari can offer a bento for him.

It was first broadcast on January 24, 1996, and had a 7.3-percent audience share on Japanese television. The episode had a mixed reception from critics. The Anime Café and Film School Rejects disliked its poor pacing and animation quality, while Newtype, Anime News Network, and Digitally Obsessed appreciated its plot, characterization, and script.

== Plot ==
An organization named the Instrumentality Committee interrogates Nerv Captain Misato Katsuragi about Leliel, the twelfth of a series of beings named Angels, and its attempted contact with the Eva-01 mecha and its pilot, Shinji Ikari. Misato denies any attempt. After the interrogation, Nerv captain Gendo Ikari says that the Angels are beginning to gain consciousness.

Toji Suzuhara visits his sister in the hospital. The second U.S. section of Nerv in Nevada disappears after an experiment with the Eva-04, and the US government decides to transport Eva-03 to Japan. Dr. Ritsuko Akagi discusses the Dummy System, a new piloting system, with Gendo. At school, Toji is assigned by his class leader, Hikari Horaki, to bring overdue homework to Rei Ayanami, who has been absent for several days. Hikari tries to offer to accompany Toji, but she is stopped before she can speak, and Toji invites Shinji instead. Shinji accompanies him and, noticing Rei's dirty house, cleans her room; Rei blushes and thanks him.

Gendo and Nerv deputy commander Kozo Fuyutsuki discuss the Eva-04 incident and the Dead Sea Scrolls on a train. Ryoji Kaji, an investigator and Nerv member, tells Misato that the Marduk Institute, believed to be in charge of choosing Eva's pilots, does not exist. Kaji goes out with Shinji, discussing life and unpleasant situations in Kaji's garden. At the school in Tokyo-3 city, Toji is called by Ritsuko Akagi. During the afternoon, Toji and Hikari meet at school; Toji says that he has no one who prepares lunch for him, and Hikari offers to prepare something for him to eat. In the final scene, as Eva-03 travels through the skies of America, Toji silently throws a ball into the basketball court.

== Production ==
=== Genesis and staff ===
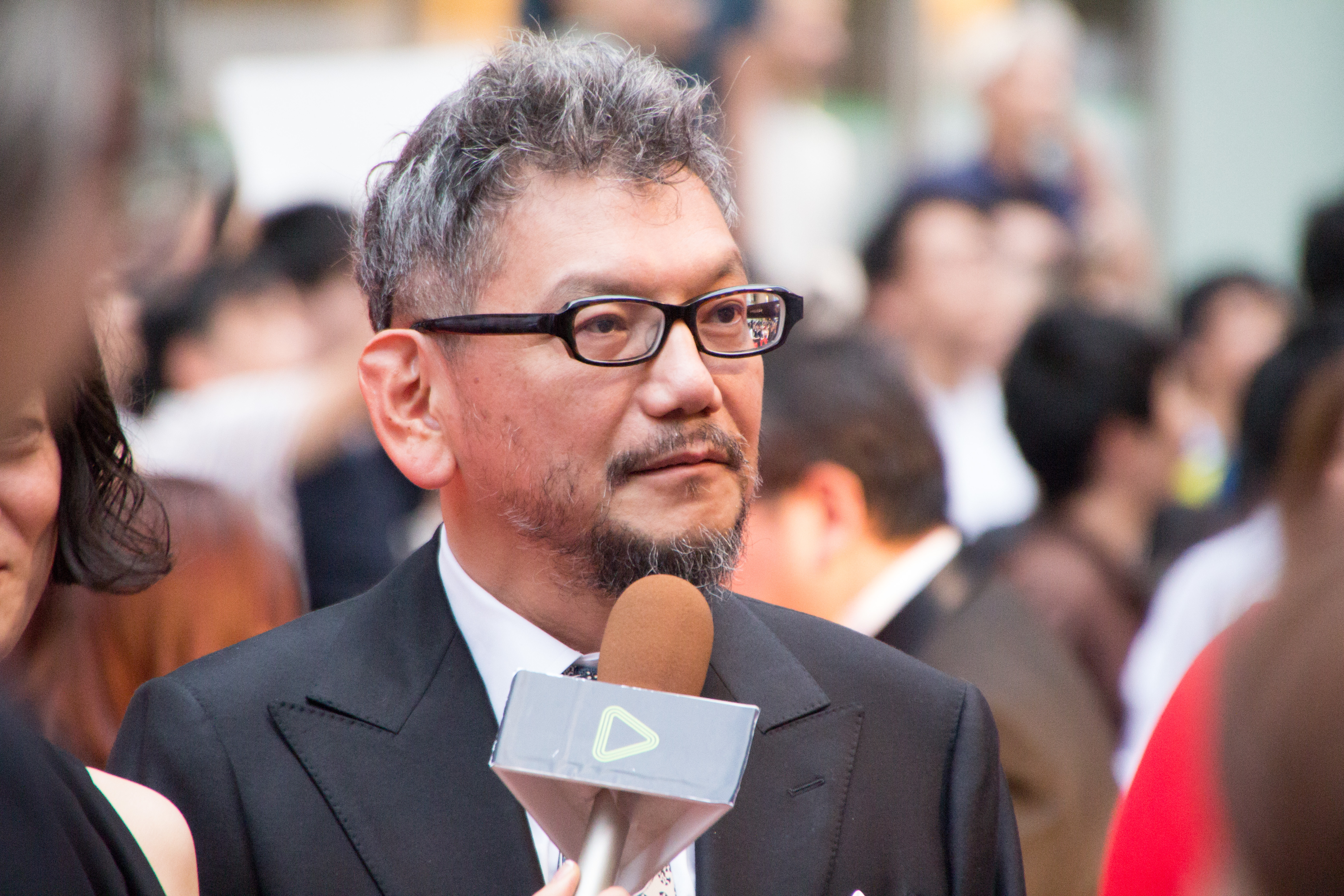
Neon Genesis Evangelion director Hideaki Anno

In 1993, Neon Genesis Evangelion studio Gainax submitted a presentation for the series entitled New Century Evangelion (tentative name) Proposal (新世紀エヴァンゲリオン (仮) 企画書, Shinseiki Evangelion (kari) kikakusho) with synopses of the planned episodes. The proposal was published the following year. For the first twelve episodes, Gainax followed it with only a few minor script alterations. From the thirteenth episode onward, the production deviated from the writers' original plan and the proposal. According to Michael House, American translator for Gainax, Neon Genesis Evangelion's main director Hideaki Anno initially intended to give the story a happy ending; during production, however, he realized he had created problematic characters and changed his plans. Hiroki Azuma, a cultural critic who interviewed Anno, said that Anno began criticizing obsessive anime fans – known as otaku – whom he considered close-minded and introverted as the series aired and created a dramatic, introspective mid-series story. As noted by Azuma, while Evangelion parodied previous anime and used "a lot of clichés" in the first part, Anno later subverted the anime tropes; comic characters like Asuka and Toji "must not be seriously injured" in an anime, but Anno broke the implicit expectations with the public making them injured in battle. Beginning with "Lilliputian Hitcher", the production ran into severe scheduling problems because of delays in episode delivery. Gainax had completed only twelve episodes by the time the series began airing after nearly two years of production, leaving the staff to produce the remaining fourteen in just six months—roughly one-third of the time they had spent on the first twelve.

In the original 1993 draft, the idea of an American division suddenly disappearing and an accident during the construction of Eva-04 were already planned. The names of Hikari's sisters and the Marduk Institute were also in the proposal. The Marduk Institute was described as an organization that acts on the "hypothesis of new mental cranial nerve vibrations", and only orphaned teenage boys could synchronize with the Evangelions; in the final broadcast version, it is a fictitious society behind which Gendo Ikari is hiding. The seventeenth episode was supposed to depict Asuka's first date and Misato's past, intended as a light episode before the series reaches its climax. Elements of the initial idea later flowed into "Magmadiver", with Asuka and Kaji at a shopping mall in the opening scene, and into the episode "He Was Aware That He Was Still a Child." The original script of the eleventh episode, "The Day Tokyo-3 Stood Still", included a mention of the S^{2} engine taken from Shamshel's body; Ritsuko would have said that the S^{2} engine is an unknown energy whose basic theory is "only a hypothesis". In another scene, Gendo asks Rei to join him for a meal while she lies completely naked inside a tube. In an interview, the series' character designer, Yoshiyuki Sadamoto, said that the image of Gendo returning to his room to find Rei waiting for him naked formed the basis of his initial conception of Rei Ayanami. According to assistant director Kazuya Tsurumaki, the staff originally conceived Rei as the clone of Gendo's deceased wife, making her both a wife and a daughter figure to him; Tsurumaki added that the most compelling aspect of their relationship lay precisely in the fact that they never entered into a sexual relationship despite the incestuous atmosphere of the original concept. For the image of a girl suspended inside a tube filled with liquid and bubbles the staff also drew inspiration from the Fight! Iczer One OVA anime series.

Shinji Higuchi and Hideaki Anno wrote the screenplay for "Fourth Children", while Akira Oguro drew the storyboards. Minoru Ohara directed the episode, and Mau Hanabata was its chief animator. Production involved studios other than Gainax, including FAI International, Neox, and Cockpit Studio. Singer Aki sang "Jungle Version", a "Fly Me to the Moon" cover, as the episode's ending theme.

=== Development and writing ===
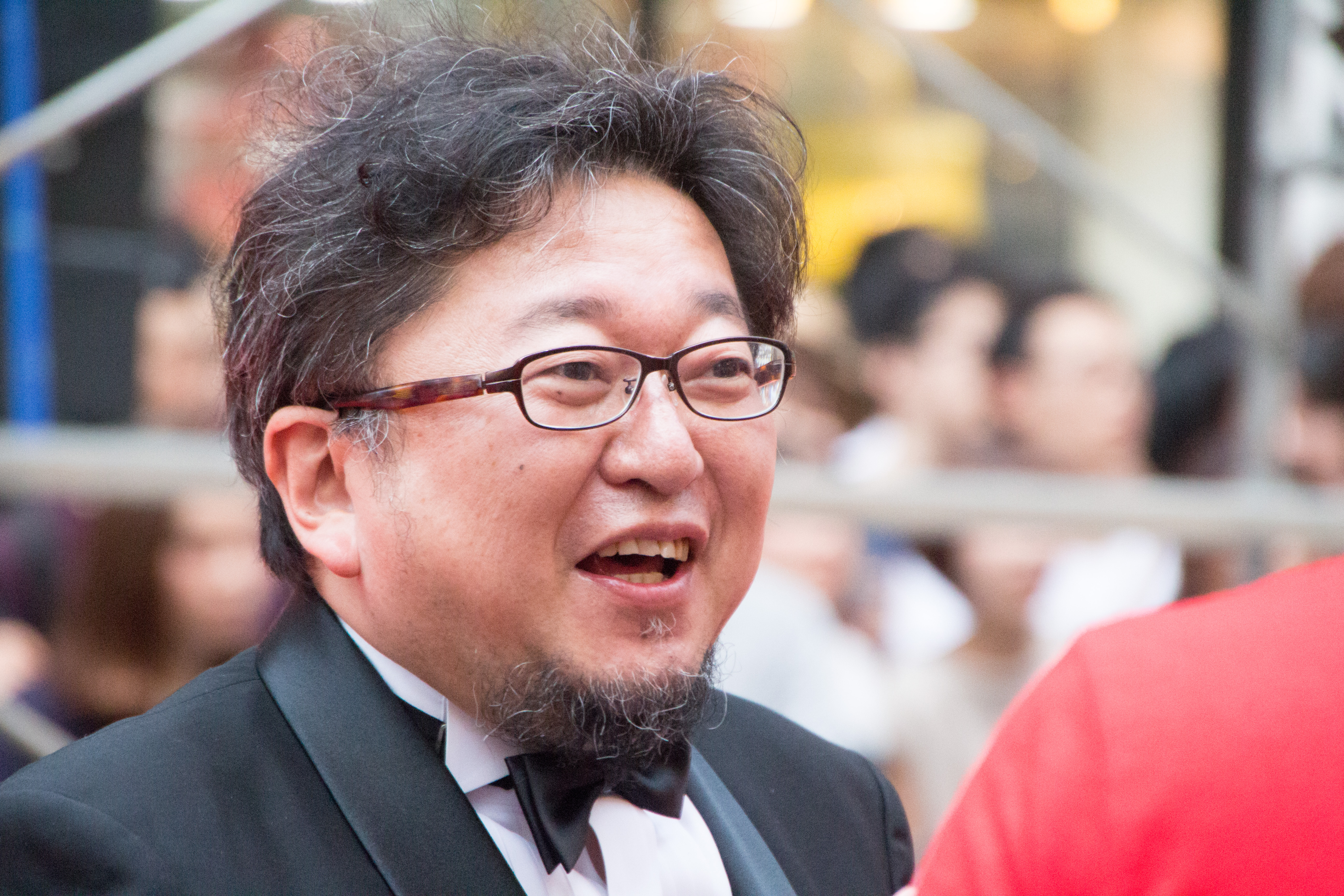
Shinji Higuchi wrote the script for "Fourth Child".

Shinji Higuchi, who worked on the episode's script, wrote "Fourth Children" as the "calm before the storm" of "Ambivalence" and "Introjection," focusing on the character's interpersonal relationships before showing Shinji losing the emotional support of Toji and Misato. The story is preparation for the following episode in which Gendo betrays Shinji; according to writer Virginie Nebbia, Higuchi borrowed the technique of two linked episodes from the Ultraman franchise. Because of his commitments to Gamera 2: Attack of Legion (1996), he left the rest to Anno after writing the draft for "Fourth Children" and Ambivalence", causing problems for the production. The episode's original draft did not initially include the scene in which Hikari offers to make Toji lunch. Furthermore, the script explicitly called for reusing a discarded idea from the series' fifth episode, "Rei I", in the episode's ending scene: Toji, jealous of the attention Shinji received from the girls at school, would attempt a basketball shot and miss in "Rei I". The following episode's original draft also included a scene in which Toji visited his sister in the hospital and gave her a present.

Higuchi wanted to emphasize the fragility of Tokyo-3 city and its infrastructure at this stage of the series, with Shinji's school portrayed as a building that can be dismantled at any time. Nerv, by contrast, is depicted as increasingly powerful. According to Higuchi, the relationship between Shinji and Misato is as fragile as Tokyo-3. He compared this scenario to the Return of Ultraman series. In Return of Ultraman, Hideki Gō alternates between the Monster Attack Team and the Sakata family, his civilian friends and recurring characters in the series. His friends Ken and Aki Sakata, however, suddenly die in a car accident. Enjoying plots with an "overwhelming sense of impermanence," Higuchi tried to recreate a similar story; however, he regretted making Hikari a stereotypical "young girl in love". He wanted to recreate a "vacillating" adolescent mind, since he could not express himself in junior high school when he fell in love with someone. According to Higuchi, Neon Genesis Evangelion characters usually do not trust other people. Hikari falls in love with Toji, however; this contrast underscores the tragedy of Toji, who is severely injured in battle in the following episode.

Evangelion Chronicle magazine noted that "Fourth Children" has many scenes set at dusk and distant shots, creating a third-person perspective; this directorial device presents events in an objective, detached manner, in contrast to the introspective, subjective perspective of other scenes in the series. Higuchi said in an interview that he disliked plots driven only by characters emotions, and wanted to make something similar to Jun Ichikawa's films. Azuma noted that Anno used directorial techniques similar to those of Jean-Luc Godard from the seventeenth episode onward. According to Azuma, however, Anno was not directly influenced by Godard; Anno named among his influences Kihachi Okamoto instead, a director influenced by Godard. The episode's filmbook noted that Kaji is possibly modeled on UFO's Captain Foster. Higuchi said that Anno asked him to portray Kaji like Masao Kusakari, who played Shunsuke Ryuzaki in the television series Pro Hunter. The Dummy Plug story was originally included in the episode "Lilliputian Hitcher", written by animator Mitsuo Iso; Iso, however, was not involved in the making of subsequent episodes, so the idea of a pseudo-personality for Rei, introduced in "Fourth Children", was the brainchild of another staff member. Furthermore, the episode has a vending-machine scene typical of Gunbuster, an earlier work by Anno.

== Cultural references ==
The original title of the episode is "Fourth Children." Pilots in the series are called "Children," even a single pilot. According to writers Kazuhisa Fujie and Martin Foster, the term may refer to the "children of God" mentioned in the New Testament. The choice to retain the plural for individual pilots has been interpreted as foreshadowing the fact that Rei has many clones, and as an homage to the anime series Space Runaway Ideon. Academic Masaki Miyakawa compared the scene in which Nerv's staff is around a table after the Second Branch incident to a similar scene in the 1974 anime series Space Battleship Yamato, while Japanese writer Taro Igarashi interpreted the scene in which the Nerv train seems suspended in the air as a possible homage to Galaxy Express 999. The names of Hikari's sisters, Nozomi and Kodama, are Japanese high-speed trains. "Fourth Children" also cites the JS Myōkō destroyer. A Nerv site in Matsushiro is named; in the actual Matsushiro, there is an underground Japanese imperial headquarters, whose space Nerv used. Writer Dennis Redmond also wrote that the disappearance of the Nerv base in Nevada is reminiscent of the post-Cold War scenario of Half-Life, which depicts a similar catastrophe at the Black Mesa Research Facility in Arizona.

"Fourth Children" also refers to scientific concepts and religion, particularly Christianity. Early in the episode, Dr. Akagi says that the second U.S. branch of Nerv was probably swallowed by a Dirac sea and disappeared. The expression refers to Paul Dirac's vacuum theoretic model, but critics have linked Evangelion's depiction of the Dirac sea more to the version presented in the novel Ten Billion Days and One Hundred Billion Nights (億の昼と千億の夜, Oku no hiru to sen oku no yoru) by Ryū Mitsuse than the actual Dirac sea. In another scene, portfolios of Shinji and other characters are seen, in which the term apoptosis is mentioned. The Dead Sea Scrolls of Seele, inspired by the real Qumran scrolls, are also mentioned. In the original storyboard, the Seele was supposed to be called "Essenes", a Second Temple Judaism sect. Kazuhiza Fujie and Martin Foster wrote that the Dead Sea Scrolls were reportedly deposited by the Essenes. In one of Mitsuo Iso's proposals, Adam would have been discovered by the Essenes, known for being a Jewish sect particularly scrupulous about excrements and for having their latrines kilometers away from Qumran; from Adam's excrement would have been born a man later known as John (ヨハネ, Yohane).

Kaji tells Misato that the Marduk Institute is a fictitious corporation behind which Nerv hides. The institute's name refers to the Babylonian deity Marduk, known by dozens of epithets; Neon Genesis Evangelion's Marduk Institute analogously consists of dozens of fictitious enterprises. According to Dokan magazine, the name Marduk also refers to the alien race of the same name present in the Macross II series. In the final scene Eva-03 is carried, crucified, in the air. The cross is a recurring motif in the series; according to an Evangelion program book, it has the double meaning of bloody death and self-sacrifice, but it is unclear which meaning the series uses. Evangelion assistant director Kazuya Tsurumaki stated in an interview that Christian symbols were used for aesthetic reasons by the staff because they were considered "cool" to its Japanese audience and to distinguish Neon Genesis Evangelion from other mecha anime.

The episode has a scene with Rei in the Dummy Plug Implant, which is formed by a test tube-like implant and brain-like tubes. There is a magic square on the floor, and the letters A, C, G, and T – corresponding to the four nucleotide bases – are visible in the room. The magic square, from The Psychological Attitude of Early Buddhist Philosophy by Anagarika Govinda, represents the structure and development of human consciousness. It has an outer rim and four stars, which writers Víctor Sellés de Lucas and Manuel Hernández-Pérez compared with The Lesser Key of Solomon. According to academic Tomoko Sakamoto and series staff, the device backs up Rei's memory. The Evangelion Glossary (エヴァンゲリオン用語事典, Evangerion Yougo Jiten) by Yahata Shoten also linked the Dummy System to Karl H. Pribram's holonomic brain theory, according to which memory is not limited to a specific part of the brain.

Ritsuko names the Super-Solenoid engine, also known as the S^{2} engine, in "Fourth Children". Evangelion Chronicle magazine compared the engine to a perpetual motion machine, such as the Archimedean spiral – believed to be incompatible with the laws of thermodynamics – and to the anthropic principle, according to which there is hidden energy in genes that has advanced life. Acquired through the Angel Shamshel, it gives powers to the Angels and can be linked to the Biblical fruit of life and the tree of life. In a statement for the liner notes of "Fourth Children", Kazuya Tsurumaki linked the anthropic principle to Lyall Watson's hundredth monkey phenomenon, a hypothetical scenario according to which consciousness can alter reality, and something that was previously nonexistent can become real the moment it is thought real. According to Tsurumaki, quantum physics could also be related to the hundredth monkey phenomenon, which is not to be understood as a rigidly fixed number, and even a single person can modify reality, making their dreams become true.

== Analysis and themes ==
"Fourth Children" has elements of scholastic romantic comedy, focusing on character emotions, their relationships and worldbuilding. Asuka scolds Shinji for forgetting their lunch, and Toji says that they look like two bickering spouses. Hikari's feminine side, Rei's emotions and Shinji's evolution are also explored. Toji reveals that he eats pre-packaged food, and Hikari takes the opportunity to make him a bento; according to writer Claudio Cordella, bento becomes "the only way a girl and a boy can communicate with each other". Misato is perplexed by a choice and, unlike Ritsuko, tries to prioritize her feelings, which has sparked past disagreements with Ritsuko. Writer Álvaro Arbonés noted the episode is built around the notion of Toji as a dramatic counterpoint to Shinji and its editing makes clear who the new Eva-03 pilot is. In another scene, Ritsuko gives Rei a look suggesting frustration or jealousy, a foreshadowing of Ritsuko's relationship with Gendo. Rei, who had been cold, blushes at Shinji's kindness and realizes that she never expressed gratitude to Gendo, indicating her evolution and increased emotion. Newtype magazine noted that when Shinji cleans Rei's room Toji points out how he has changed from their first meeting, in which he was a lonely person who "did not want to engage with other people". Furthermore, Ritsuko and Commander Ikari discuss the Dummy System, saying that "the soul cannot be digitized". The concept of a soul is examined later in the series, and Nerv treats it as a concrete entity. Dennis Redmond interpreted this as a "stinging critique of East Asia's indigenous industrialism".

Commander Ikari argues in another scene with Fuyutsuki about the city of Tokyo-3 in a train, saying that after the expulsion from Eden, humanity took refuge in cities with the help of science; the dialogue refers to the book of Genesis. According to the series' film books, the scene reveals a number of mysteries about the Evangelion plot. Redmond wrote that the dialogue implies that Gendo "is not the stereotypical mad scientist", revealing an "unexpected vein of humanity" in him. According to writer Taro Igarashi, unlike other science fiction stories like Blade Runner, Tokyo-3 is not depicted as a typical dirty dystopian city, but as a Japanese post-Second World War city, as if the Second Impact catastrophe had not occurred. Igarashi linked Tokyo-3's depiction with a comment of Anno included in the first volume of the Evangelion manga, in which he describes the Evangelion setting as a world in which "the shelves of convenience stores are filled". Igarashi also noted that Gendo and Fuyutsuki describe Tokyo-3 as a city of cowards who run away from their enemies; he linked the description of Tokyo-3 to Shinji, whom he described as an "autistic" character. As noted by Igarashi, Tokyo-3 is depicted as a miniature city closed to others and that serves as a metaphor for the ego. Noting how it has a cruciform shape, Igarashi linked it shape to a four-part garden, a possible reference to the Biblical Paradise. For scholar Yoshihiro Tanigawa, Tokyo "is the center of rationality" in the Evangelion world. According to Tanigawa, Gendo and Fuyutsuki's conversation hides an "important point about the self" in Evangelion; they believe this human condition must be eliminated, so "they commit themselves to their ego-dissolving project in order to overcome our fundamental cowardice".

In the first scene, Misato is questioned by the Instrumentality Committee. The Committee expresses concerns about the Angels getting more intelligent and asks whether the Angel launched a psychological attack against Shinji. Misato rejects the possibility of systematic action by the Angels, to which the Commission corresponds: "Their actions are independent, so far". At the end of the session, Gendo says that "the Angels are beginning to attain intelligence". The possibility of Angels learning and evolving is introduced. According to academic Satoshi Tsukamoto, the Angels "are attempting to acquire abilities to compete against human beings and control them". Japanese writer Masashi Kitamura agreed that the Angels gradually progress in communicating with the Evas they fight, and send messages to Shinji during the series. In another scene, Kaji takes Shinji to his melon field; Evangelion Chronicle noted that the melons' shape resembles that of the Angel Leliel. According to Redmond, Kaji's field indicates that Nerv's geofront "is also the symbolic global ecology of Tokyo-3's multinational city". Perhaps concerned about Shinji, Kaji begins to address unpleasant things and the pleasure of seeing something grow; Kaji tells Shinji that those who suffer show kindness to others. The theme of "unpleasant things" had already been explored in the previous episode. Scholar David Fajardo-Chica noted Kaji, unlike Gendo or Ritsuko, "always maintains that people only need personal reflection to understand social dynamics" in his philosophical conversations with Shinji. For writer Andrew M. Winters, Shinji becomes more sympathetic to the idea that people don't understand themselves, which allows him to accept people's flaws, "including his own". According to scholar Emily Wati Muir, Shinji also produces justification for war because "his newfound courage to protect humanity could arguably be considered 'the protection of the innocent'".

Another episode theme is masculinity, which has been addressed in previous episodes of the series. According to Anime Feminist website writers, Shinji started to internalize toxic masculinity in this story arc. Misato tells Shinji to act like a man in the early episodes, and Asuka takes him aback with phrases like "You are a man, aren't you?" which question his masculinity. In the vending-machine scene, Kaji suggests going out to Shinji, and Shinji replies, "I'm a boy"; this could mean that the boy is trying to find self-confidence and is accepting his masculine role. In contrast, academic Cristopher Smith said that after being trapped in the Eva-01 cockpit and the womb-like Leliel in the previous episode, Shinji's violent hegemonic masculinity collapses; in "Fourth Child", he returns to his normal speech patterns and happily cleans Rei’s apartment. Toji is also a boy trying to act forcibly masculine. Yūichirō Oguro, editor of the extra materials for the series' home-video editions, noted that Toji wears a tracksuit despite not being good at sports. In the scene where Toji and Shinji visit Rei's room, Toji says that cleaning is not something a real man should do. Oguro related this theme to the novel Ai to gensō no fascism (愛と幻想のファシズム; "The Fascism of Love and Fantasy") by Ryū Murakami, from which the names Toji Suzuhara and Kensuke Aida are taken; in Murakami's novel, machismo is explored, and masculinity is seen as an illusion. Toji's behaviour changes after his selection as an Eva pilot, probably because he knows Shinji's pain in piloting the Eva. According to Yūichirō Oguro, the episode's final scene, in which Toji plays basketball, represents his final decision.

== Reception ==
"Fourth Children" was first broadcast on January 24, 1996, and had a 7.3-percent audience share on Japanese television. Merchandise based on the episode, including a line of T-shirts, has been released.

The episode received a mixed reception. GameFan magazine praised "Fourth Children" and "Ambivalence", giving the highest rating for the episodes' story. Protoculture Addicts magazine similarly gave a positive review of the home video release containing the two episodes. Film School Rejects' Maxi Covill said that there is a lot of world-building in "Fourth Children", making the episode "a little on the slow side". The Anime Café's Akio Nagatomi noted that the animation quality declined, and criticized the writing: "It almost feels as if the writers had run out of materials, and they're trying to fill in the time to make their allocated 24-episode slot". According to Nagatomi, the writers could have better set up the plot twist of Toji being the Fourth Child. He also criticized the long scenes of Gendo and Fuyutsuki on the train: "Their entire conversation could have been presented in far less time, without covering all the other extraneous garbage". Other reviewers were more appreciative. Newtype described the representation of Hikari's feelings as "touching". DVD Talk plauded "Fourth Children" and the previous two installments as "excellent" for their "consistent batch of character drama and lighter moments". Digitally Obsessed's Joel Cunningham gave "Fourth Children" a positive review, praising the episode's plot presentation and writing that "nicely illustrates the balance this series is able to maintain". Anime News Network's Martin Theron praised "Fourth Children" and the other episodes of the story arc: "Nothing that happens in these episodes is coincidence. Even the smallest details matter".
