= Ambivalence (Neon Genesis Evangelion) =

- Neon Genesis Evangelion episode
- Eva-03 possessed by Angel Bardiel with the Sun behind it. Writer Virginie Nebbia noted how "Ambivalence" uses directional techniques used by Ultraman director Akio Jissōji, particularly the use of scenes illuminated by the red of the sunset.
- Episode no.: Episode 18
- Directed by: Tensai Okamura
- Written by: Hideaki Anno, Shinji Higuchi
- Original air date: January 31, 1996
- Running time: 22 minutes

Episode chronology
← Previous "Fourth Children"	Next → "Introjection"

"Ambivalence" (Note: Japanese: 命の選択を, Hepburn: Inochi no sentaku o; lit. 'Life and Death Decisions') is the eighteenth episode of the Japanese anime television series Neon Genesis Evangelion, which was created by animation studio Gainax. Hideaki Anno and Shinji Higuchi wrote the episode, which the animator Tensai Okamura directed. The series' protagonist is Shinji Ikari, a teenage boy whose father Gendo recruited him to the special military organization Nerv to pilot a gigantic biomechanical mecha named Evangelion into combat against beings called Angels. In this episode, a new pilot named Toji Suzuhara enters Eva-03. Eva-03 goes out of control after being possessed by the Angel Bardiel during its activation experiment. Shinji, aboard his Eva-01, refuses to fight against 03, bringing him into conflict with his father.

"Ambivalence" was produced by Production I.G., among others; Shinji Higuchi conceived the episode as a diptych with the previous episode "Fourth Children", and was inspired by the Ultraman franchise. Critics have compared the writing on Ambivalence to Anno's personal experiences and the direction of the works of Sergei Eisenstein, Jean-Luc Godard, and especially Akio Jissōji. The conflict between Gendo and Shinji has been compared to the dilemma of the Carneades table. The episode contains cultural references to earlier anime, including Dear Brother, and its title references the clinical psychologist Eugen Bleuler's concept of the same name.

The episode was first broadcast on January 31, 1996, and drew a 9.6 percent audience share on Japanese television. Critics praised the script, direction, and battle scenes, considering it one of the best episodes in the series, although some viewers during the first airing criticized it for the violence of the confrontation against Bardiel.

== Plot ==
During its airlift between the United States and Japan, the mecha Evangelion 03 passes through an electrical storm. Misato Katsuragi, head of the strategic department of the special agency Nerv, fails to tell her subordinate Shinji Ikari, the pilot of the Eva-01, the identity of the 03's pilot. At Tokyo-3 Middle School, Eva-02's pilot Asuka Langley Soryu verbally attacks her classmate Toji Suzuhara. Toji then talks with Eva-00's pilot Rei Ayanami about Ayanami's feelings for Shinji. After school, Asuka and her friend Hikari Horaki talk about Toji, and Hikari reveals she is in love with him. In the absence of Misato, Shinji and Asuka's legal guardian, Misato's boyfriend Ryoji Kaji takes care of the two and sleeps at their house; Asuka refuses to talk to Shinji about the new pilot, while Shinji and Kaji discuss the psychological distance that separates people, especially men and women.

During an activation test, the Eva-03 goes out of control, gaping its jaws and causing an explosion. The Evangelion 03 is revealed to be possessed by Bardiel, the thirteenth in a series of enemies of humankind called Angels. Bardiel fights Rei's Eva-00 and attempts to merge with it. The Angel easily defeats both Eva-00 and Eva-02. Shinji refuses to fight 03 and injure its pilot. Gendo Ikari, captain of the Nerv, activates a device named Dummy System; the Eva-01 self-activates and violently destroys the Eva-03, including the pilot's cockpit, while Shinji helplessly watches. Meanwhile, Hikari is in the kitchen preparing a bento for Toji, wondering if he will eat it. After the battle, Shinji sees the pilot Toji, who has survived, extracted from the cockpit; Toji is seriously wounded, and Shinji screams.

== Production ==
=== Genesis and staff ===
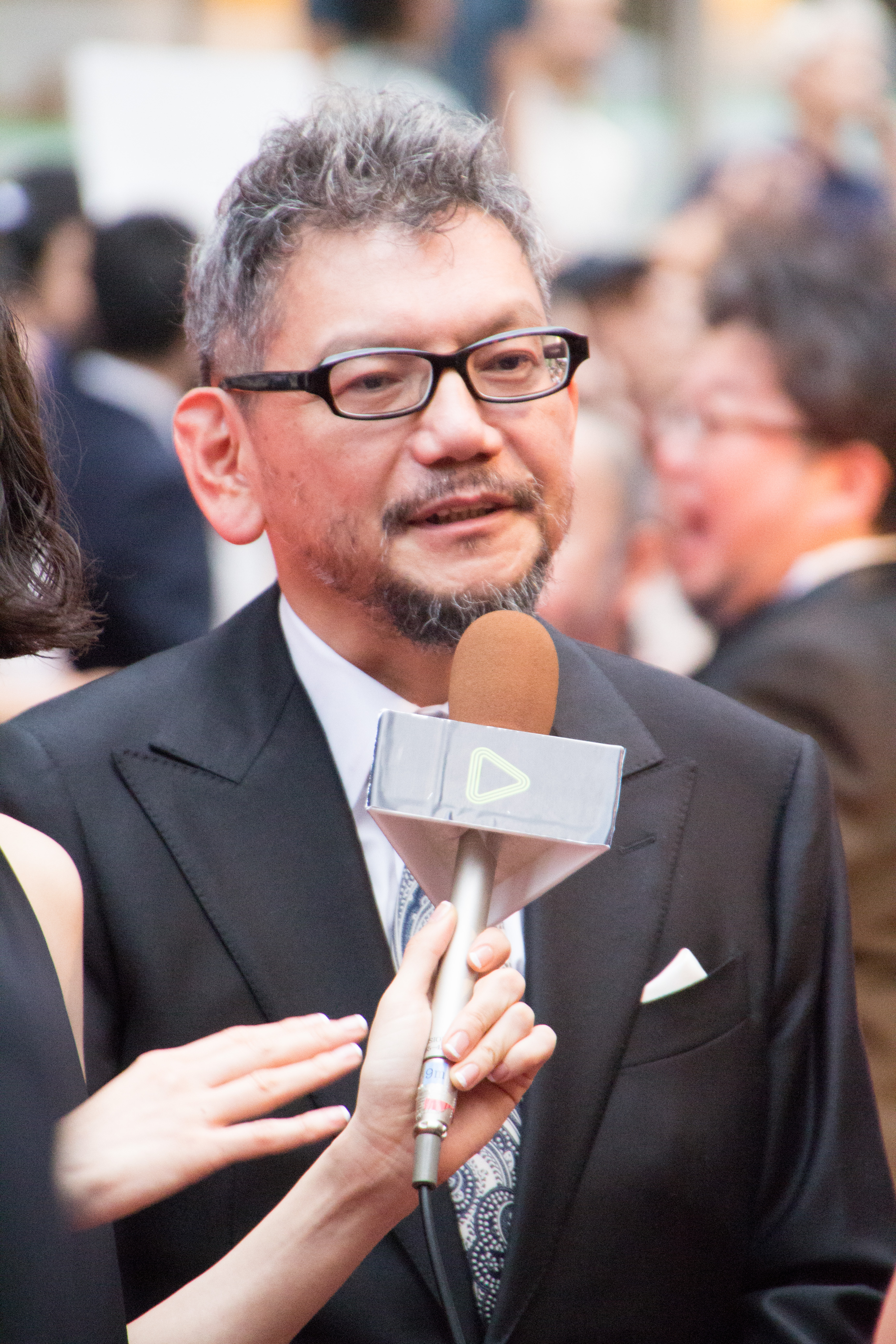
Neon Genesis Evangelion director Hideaki Anno

In 1994, Gainax published a presentation document for Neon Genesis Evangelion containing synopses of the planned episodes. For the first twelve episodes, the company followed the proposal's schedule with a few minor script differences. Gainax already planned an American-built Eva-03 in the proposal document. From the thirteenth episode onward, production deviated from the writers' original plan and the submission document. According to Michael House, Gainax's American translator, Neon Genesis Evangelion's main director Hideaki Anno initially intended to give the story a happy ending, but his plans in the making of the series changed after he realized he had created problematic characters. According to Hiroki Azuma, a culture critic who interviewed Anno, while the series was being broadcast, Anno began to criticize obsessive anime fans, known in Japanese as otaku, whom he considered closed-minded and introverted. Anno changed his original plans by creating a more-dramatic, introspective, mid-series story.

Beginning with "Lilliputian Hitcher", the production ran into severe scheduling problems because of delays in episode delivery. Gainax had completed only twelve episodes by the time the series began airing after nearly two years of production, leaving the staff to produce the remaining fourteen in just six months—roughly one-third of the time they had spent on the first twelve. The disastrous production schedule drastically reduced the number of available animation cels, leading to a corresponding decline in animation quality and provoking disagreements among the series' staff. Around the time of "Ambivalence" and the following episode, Anno and Gainax realized that they could no longer produce the series to a satisfactory standard while still meeting the broadcast schedule, although they continued trying to do so until the very end. These therefore became the last episodes to make full use of virtually all the studio's remaining resources before the production system completely collapsed. Anno himself likened the production to a "live performance" without a strict plan allowing the series to take shape in response to changing circumstances and production constraints. Around the eighteenth and nineteenth episodes, he finally decided how the series would end.

Shinji Higuchi and Hideaki Anno wrote the screenplay for "Ambivalence", and Tensai Okamura produced the storyboards. Okamura also directed the episode, assisted by Masahiko Otsuka and Ken Ando. Kazuchika Kise worked as the chief animator. Production involved studios other than Gainax, including Studio Mark and Production I.G. Production I.G previously worked on animation for the thirteenth episode, which includes another microscopic Angel called Iruel, and also worked on computer-generated imagery (CGI) for The End of Evangelion (1997). According to the Red Cross Book, the official booklet on The End of Evangelion, the series makes extensive use of CGI, which was processed in a flat, two-dimensional manner like computer screens. At first, Production I.G. was supposed to produce the whole anime, and the company president, Mitsuhisa Ishikawa, was willing to do so; for various reasons, including Mamoru Oshii's apparent refusal, the original plans were changed, so Production I.G. only took care of "Lilliputian Hitcher" and other individual episodes.

=== Development and writing ===
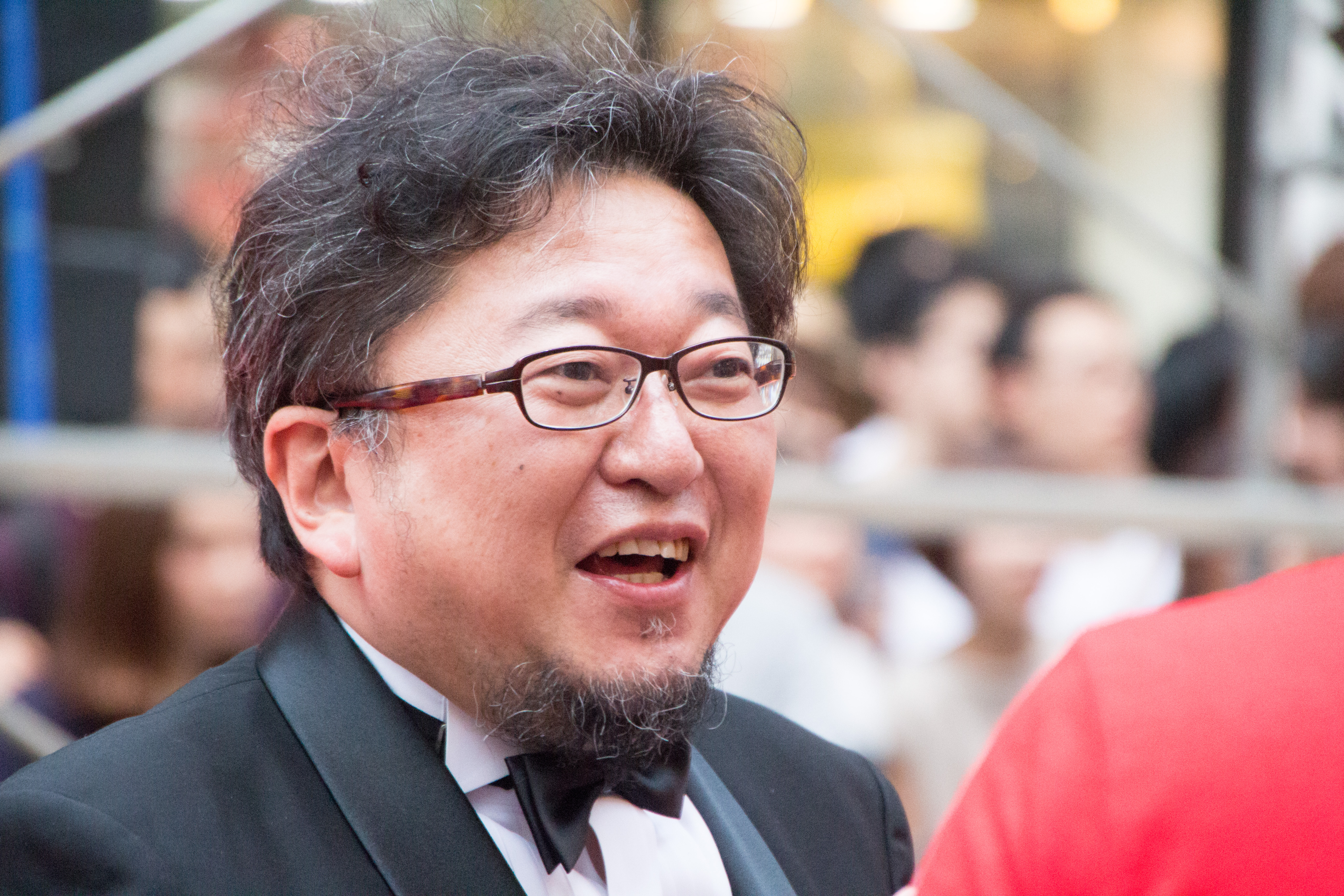
Shinji Higuchi wrote the script for "Fourth Child" and "Ambivalence"

In the 1993 Proposal, Gainax decided the basic plot for the eighteenth episode would have Shinji making a choice and fighting an Angel-controlled Eva-03 piloted by his friend. Hiroki Azuma noted that while Evangelion parodies earlier anime shows and uses "a lot of clichés" in its first part, Anno later subverted the anime tropes. While comic characters like Asuka and Toji "must not be seriously injured in an anime", Anno broke the implicit audience expectations, making them become injured in battle. Asuka's story reflected the changes. Despite receiving criticism for the violence, Anno defended his choice; believing violence is part of normal human life, Anno attempted to show the horror and crudeness of life, contradicting expectations and the pleasure principle of anime fans. According to Evangelion assistant director Kazuya Tsurumaki, the show's writers conceived Unit-03 in⁣ci⁣dent as a "cru⁣cial, cli⁣mac⁣tic episode" and were forced to abandon the portray⁣al of Asuka as a major char⁣ac⁣ter. After the Unit-03 in⁣ci⁣dent, "even the scenes where she does ap⁣pear were bound to be re⁣duced".

Shinji Higuchi, who worked on the episode's script, also wrote the previous episode "Fourth Child", as a precursor to "Ambivalence". According to writer Virginie Nebbia, Higuchi borrowed the idea of two linked episodes from the Ultraman franchise. Nebbia also compared Bardiel's role in "Ambivalence" with that of Imit Ultraman from the Ultraman series, in which fake Ultramans are controlled by Alien Zarab. Because of his commitments to Gamera 2: Attack of Legion (1996), after writing the drafts for "Fourth Child" and Ambivalence", Higuchi left finishing the scripts to Anno, causing problems for the production. Other proposals were put forward during production by animator and writer Mitsuo Iso. In Iso's ideas, Gendo would have inserted a password to disable a function that prevents Evangelion units from fighting each other, thus delivering the final blow to Toji via a device called the Black Tower. In the twenty-third episode, Shinji would later testify before a commission against Gendo about the incident. Gainax originally planned a scene in which Shinji, standing on the roof of Tokyo-3 Middle School, asked Asuka whether something had happened between her and Misato; Asuka would have brusquely denied it before turning away. The scene between Rei and Toji, meanwhile, was originally set on the hill behind the school rather than on the roof. During the battle against Bardiel-infected Eva-03, tentacles were also meant to emerge and infect Eva-00.

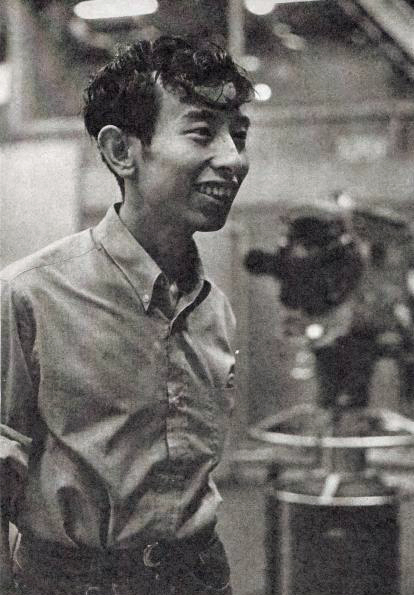
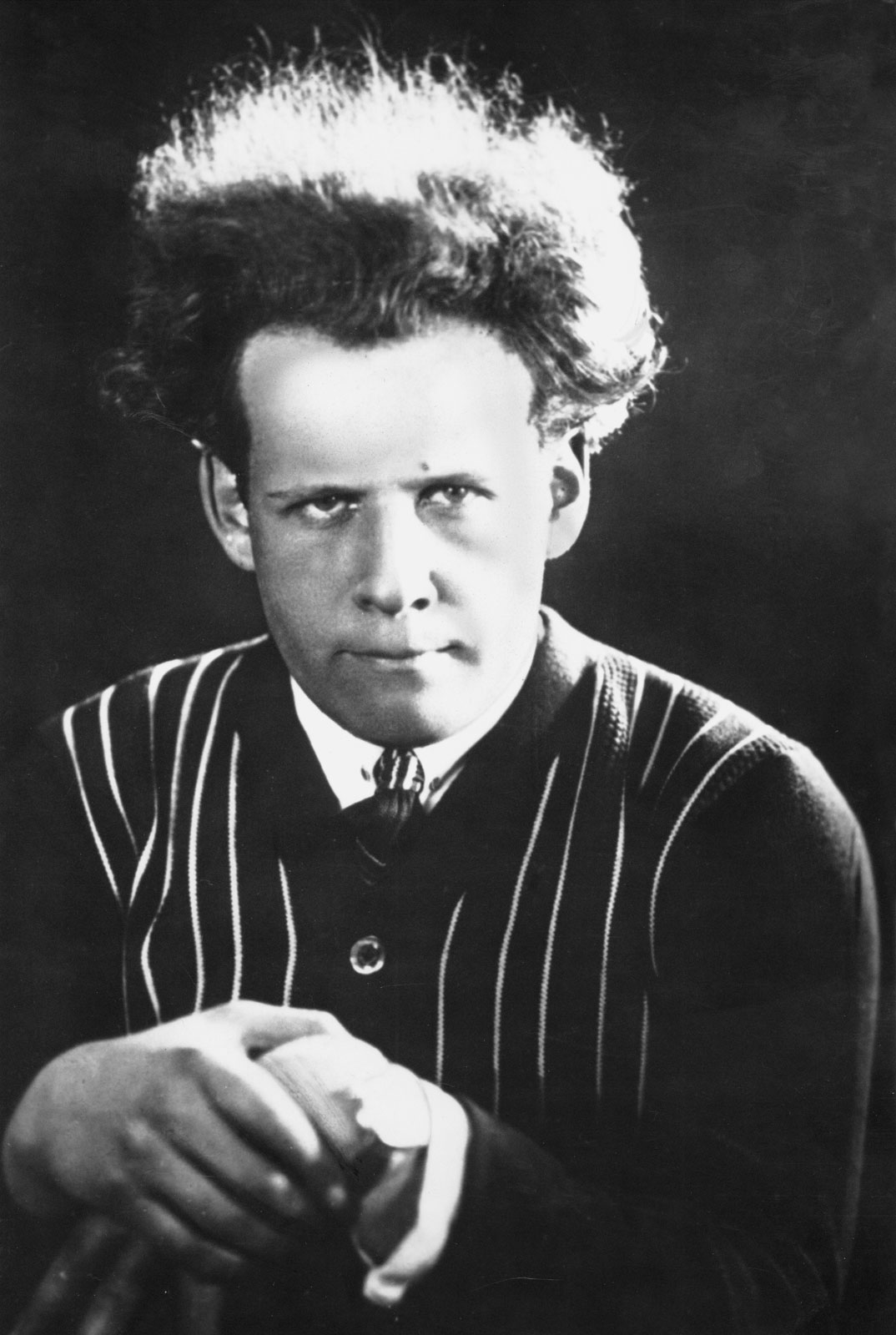
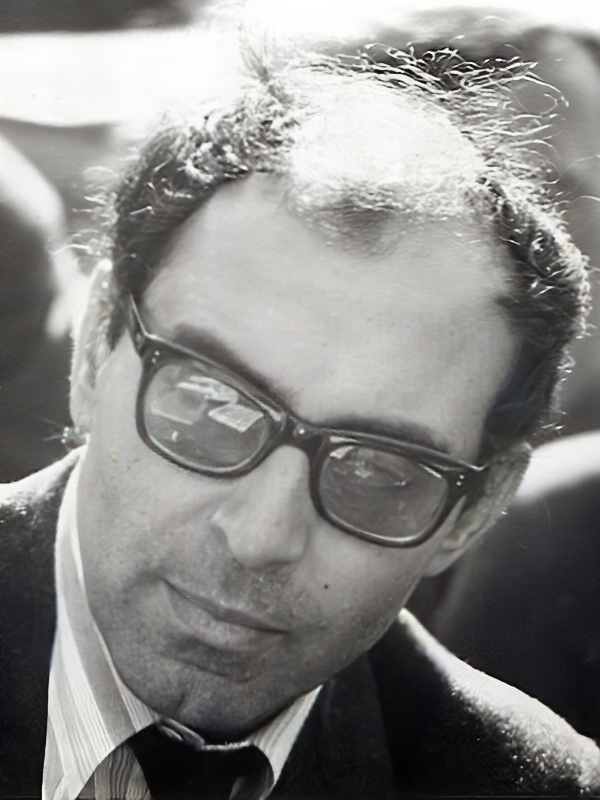
Critics compared the "Ambivalence" directional style with the works of Akio Jissōji, Sergei Eisenstein, and Jean-Luc Godard.

In the scene in which Eva-03 arrives in Japan, a diffusion process was applied to the cels to depict a heat haze. Furthermore, in the episode's original script was a scene in which Toji visits his sister in her hospital room. Although his sister was not supposed to be framed and have dialogue, Toji would tell her he had made his decision and leave her a gift. According to the Evangelion Chronicle magazine, "Ambivalence" does not explicitly state the name of the Fourth Child, although his identity is clear; the characters become anxious, arousing suspense for the climax in viewers. The same magazine noted there is no scene showing Toji wearing the Evangelion pilots' plugsuit and boarding the mecha, perhaps to shock viewers. According to official filmbooks on the series, the scene in which Hikari happily prepares bento for Toji unaware of the battle emphasizes the brutality of the confrontation.

Anno initially considered killing Toji after his confrontation with Eva-01; at the beginning of the series' production, he promised King Records producer Toshimichi Ōtsuki he would not kill child characters, so he reconsidered, and the writing staff decided to leave Toji mutilated. The production had fallen so far behind schedule that Otsuki had not even seen Eva-03 before the episode aired. When he came across a model of it at a party celebrating the end of the series' production in a building in Shinjuku, he was taken by surprise and wondered who had authorized its release. In the final version of the script, Toji loses only his left leg. This event is related to Anno's personal experience; his father, Takuyo Anno, lost his left leg in a youthful accident with a power saw and was forced to wear a prosthesis. Following the accident, Anno developed a fascination with deformity, believing he could love only something that is stumpy. In Tetsujin 28-go, one of Anno's childhood shows, a robot loses an arm; Anno grew up believing he could not love a perfect thing and that amputated mecha were more beautiful. For this reason, Anno included scenes in which mechas are cruelly mutilated in his works. Academic scholar River Seager described the result as "eerie and gothic, often blurring the line between the genres of mecha and horror". Writer Claudio Cordella similarly stated that Evangelion units' fights are "brutal, taking on authentic splatter horror film tones".

Japanese academic Osamu Tsukihashi compared the direction of the battle between Unit 01 and Bardiel to Sergei Eisenstein's film Aleksandr Nevsky (1938). As in Aleksandr Nevsky, close-up shots depicting the facial expressions of Eva units are first used during the clash, followed by a shot of the scenery, and a description of the movement. Hiroki Azuma also noted Anno uses directorial techniques similar to those of Jean-Luc Godard in "Ambivalence" and other Evangelion episodes. According to Azuma, Anno was not directly influenced by Godard; however, Anno named Kihachi Okamoto, who was influenced by Godard, among his influences. Trees and road signs are framed throughout the clash against Bardiel to give a sense of grandeur to the Evangelions and the battle. Such camera angles are reminiscent of old tokusatsu live-action films. Writer Virginie Nebbia also compared the episode's direction to that of Akio Jissōji, director of Ultraman; according to Nebbia, "Ambivalence" shares several elements typical of Jissōji's direction, such as the use of images reflected in glass, strong contrasts between figure and background, and scenes lit by the red of twilight.

=== Voice acting and music ===
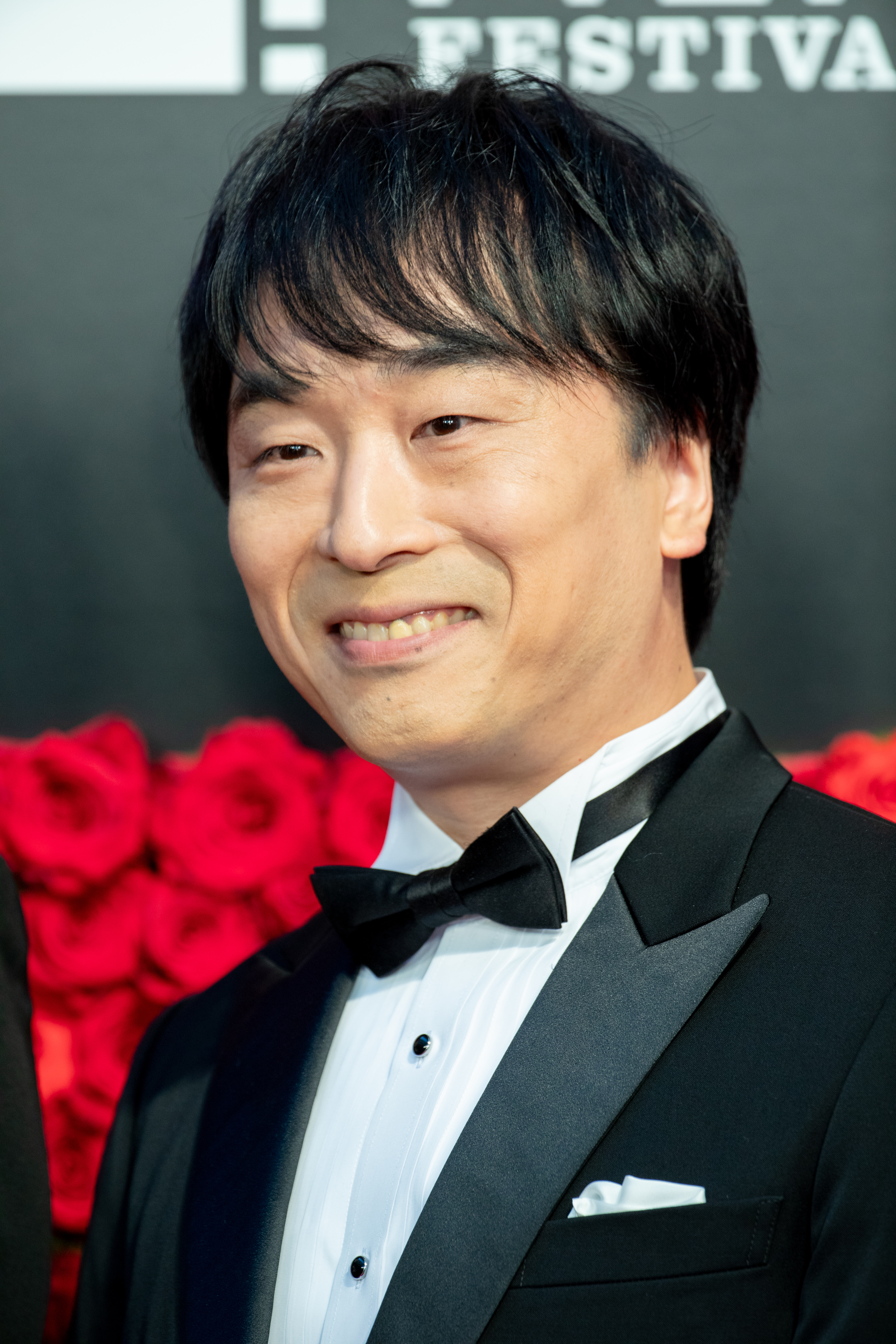
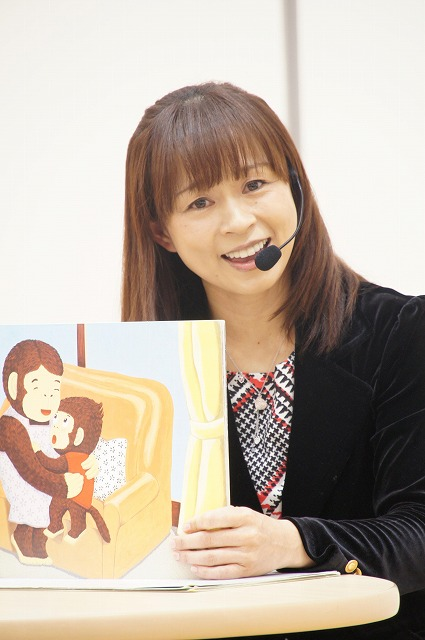
Tomokazu Seki and Junko Iwao, original voice actors of the characters Toji Suzuhara and Hikari Horaki.

Miki Nagasawa, Akiko Hiramatsu, and Kōichi Nagano, who provided voices for several main characters in the series, also played unnamed Nerv operators in "Ambivalence". Tomokazu Seki and Eiji Maruyama voiced other unidentified male characters. Michael House, and his friends George and Hiromi Arriola, played the Nerv's native-English-speaking operators. In an interview, House stated that about three weeks before that episode was recorded, Anno asked House "if there was anyone among my obviously extensive gaijin acquaintances whom I could get for recording some dialogue in an upcoming episode". House, George, and Hiromi recorded a block of dialogue before a commercial break; Anno mixed or overlaid this material with Japanese dialogue that had been recorded earlier. House said, "I recall the result was incomprehensible".

In "Ambivalence", Shinji, who is played by voice actress Megumi Ogata, cries and screams during the fight against the Angel Bardiel; at the end of the episode, Ogata felt physically exhausted and said her "whole body [was] aching". The episode's original draft did not explicitly call for Shinji to scream; it only indicated that he was meant to lose control. Junko Iwao, original voice actress for Hikari Horaki, also cried after watching one of the last scenes of the episode, in which Hikari, who is unaware of Toji's fate, prepares bento for him.

Evangelion staff included the audio of a television program that Asuka watches in the scene in which she is at home with Shinji and Kaji; the program is also audible in the fifteenth episode. In the audible segment in the fifteenth episode, a woman insists that a man resume his relationship with her, while in "Ambivalence", she seems to have regretted their reconciliation; the woman's feelings in the program can be overlaid with Misato's feelings for Kaji. Hiramatsu played the woman, while Nagano played the man from the fictional show. British singer Claire Littley sang "Fly Me To The Moon" as the episode's closing theme song; in the home-video editions of this episode, the original version was replaced with a new one called "B-4 Guitar".

== Cultural references ==
The episode's English title "Ambivalence" is a reference to the eponymous concept in psychology Eugen Bleuler coined; in that context, ambivalence denotes the presence of conflicting feelings in an individual, and can be applied to Misato's indecision in telling Shinji the identity of the 03 pilot, and to Shinji's desire to understand Gendo by talking to Kaji but rejecting him after the battle against Bardiel. Furthermore, Shinji cannot decide whether to carry out Gendo's orders in "Ambivalence". Bleuler's term can also refer to a child's feelings toward a parent who becomes an object of attachment and hostility; this can be linked to the Eva-01 simultaneously protecting Shinji but obeying Gendo's order to destroy Unit 03. Scientific terms, such as apoptosis, amygdala, parietal lobe, hippocampus, motor cortex, and ganglion, are also mentioned in the episode.

In the first scene of "Ambivalence", during the flight of the Eva-03, English-speaking Nerv operators call the control towers Ekta 64 and Neopan 400; the names refer to the photographic-film brand names Ektachrome and Fuji Neopan. Eva-03 then lands at Matsushiro, Nagano, where Nerv's second test site is located. In historical reality, the World-War-II-era Matsushiro Underground Imperial Headquarters is located at Matsushiro. The scene in which Hikari and Asuka argue at sunset over Toji echoes a similar sequence in Osamu Dezaki's anime Dear Brother. In the same scene, a humorous, drop-like graphic symbol appears on Asuka's forehead; according to official filmbooks on the series, the symbol references a "certain magical girl anime".

Hikari's two sisters' names, Kodama and Nozomi, came from Tokaido Shinkansen line high-speed trains. Japanese architects and writers Taro Igarashi and Yasutaka Yoshimura noted that a building that is visible from Misato's apartment resembles the Bank of China Tower in Hong Kong that was designed by Ieoh Ming Pei. According to Yoshimura, this would be in keeping with other 1960s influences on Evangelion and Tokyo-3 urbanism, such as Kenzō Tange's 1960 Plan for Tokyo or Pei's own Louvre Pyramid. Writer Dennis Redmond interpreted the scream of the infected Eva-03 as a reference to Godzilla, and noted Eva-03 is framed against the setting sun, which resembles the Japanese flag in the episode. According to Redmond, this is "a dead ringer for John Woo's Hong Kong thrillers, and the conclusion will subtly quote Woo's trademark theme of warring brothers or battling doubles".

== Themes ==
According to official filmbooks on Neon Genesis Evangelion, in "Ambivalence", which is the second episode of a trilogy focusing on the Forth Child, Toji Suzuhara, there are dramatic depictions of the psychology of the Evangelion characters. Writer Álvaro Arbonés noted the first half of "Ambivalence" deals with everyday life with a sense of gravity, while the second half is full of misunderstandings and unsaid things; all the characters and viewers know who the new pilot is, and the whole episode ends with a catastrophe. Protoculture Addicts noted this story arc "pushes the horror to a paroxysm as yet unattainned in the series". The episode focuses on relationships between the protagonists and the violence of the battle against Bardiel. According to critic Kenneth Lee, Toji helps Rei realize she has a purpose during the scene in which Toji confronts her on the rooftop of Tokyo-3 school. Rei becomes aware of her feelings toward Shinji by talking to Toji, while Hikari tells Asuka about her feelings for Toji. Asuka's pride is wounded because of Toji's selection as an Eva pilot; after the shock of discovering his selection, she verbally attacks Toji. Toji exhibits a sense of duty toward his sister that is comparable to the Japanese concept of giri (義理). Moreover, as noted by Newtype magazine, in one scene in "Ambivalence", Kaji claims mutual understanding is an illusion arguing with Shinji; according to the filmbooks, this sentence is an essential sentence for understanding Neon Gensis Evangelion. For Anime Feminsit website writers, Kaji is framed as "a role model" for Shinji in this story arc. Writer Hans-Georg Eilenberger also noted Shinji admits he doesn't understand adults at the end of the conversation, so "children and adults are struggling to have even an incomplete understanding of each other".

According to academic Fabio Bartoli, "Ambivalence" and "Introjection" have the most shocking scenes of Evangelion, in which the hedgehog's dilemma shows "its most dramatic consequences"

According to the academic Fabio Bartoli, "Ambivalence" and "Introjection" have the most-shocking scenes of Evangelion, in which the hedgehog's dilemma mentioned in the third episode for the first time shows its most dramatic consequences. Comic Book Resources described the episode as a "turning point", after which Evangelion becomes darker and more dramatic. According to the writer Virginie Nebbia, the depiction of the setting sun during the battle against Eva-03 represents "the end of something". The website Looper said, "Bardiel lays the foundation for the first of three events that drive Shinji's mental health to the brink". Writer Zachary Vereb similarly described the "Ambivalence" battle as the Evangelion "most brutal scene". The only light scene episode is one in which Hikari and Asuka argue about Toji. The nature of the Evas is also highlighted in the episode.

The episode's Japanese title, "Life and Death Decisions", suggests Gendo and Shinji come to different conclusions, and Shinji must decide whether to kill or be killed. Yūichirō Oguro, editor of extra materials for the home-video editions of Neon Genesis Evangelion, likened the conflict between Gendo and Shinji to the dilemma of the "table of Carneades" of the eponymous Greek philosopher; in this dilemma, two men find themselves vying for a table on which to survive after a shipwreck. According to Carneades, already mentioned in Anno's previous work GunBuster, killing another person might be ethically legitimate in extreme life-and-death situations. According to Asiascape magazine, the battle between Shinji's Eva-01 and Bardiel shows the last part of the series questions the division between humanity and alien Angels, and the legitimacy of human resistance against them. Scholar Sano Yasuyuki also noted how Shinji loses motivation to pilot his Evangelion unit after his father's betrayal.

According to Eilenberger, Gendo's reaction to Shinji's protest demonstrates how, in his and other characters' vision, children have little value and are treated according to a "deficit view". Writers Nathan Visser and Adam Barkman also noted that Shinji shows how little he cares about his life during the fight. According to academic Yuuki Namba, by refusing to fight Shinji "runs away" from the pilot role again, as he did in the fourth episode, "Hedgehog's Dilemma". For scholars Laura Cabassa and Matteo Caparrini, Shinji has to face the fact that "he's piloting something capable of cruel destruction and annihilation beyond imagining". As noted by academic Giuseppe Gatti, in order to defeat its enemy, Eva-01 manifests against the will of his children "animal characteristics". Álvaro Arbonés wrote that Shinji's Eva, with whom he identifies and who is an extension of his body, is "a vicious entity that enjoys murdering, devouring his enemies, and putting on a vomit-inducing spectacle". Academic Philip Brophy compared the battle to that of the second episode, "The Beast". At the end of "The Beast", Shinji sees the reflection of his Eva-01 and screams in terror when he realizes "what his Eva has become"; according to Brophy, "Ambivalence" repeats "this terrifying identification with the Self as Other".

According to the academic Cristopher Smith, while Shinji previously performed violent hegemonic masculinity on the Angels on behalf of society in the series, he cannot perform the same violence on his friends; while the relationship between the pilot and the robot is usually the fulfillment of power masculine fantasies in mecha genre, in "Ambivalence" it becomes a mechanism of trauma, forcing Shinji to watch his "second skin" perform violence he does not desire. According to Evangelion Chronicle, the fight is more like a "bizarre massacre" than a battle, and the use of Dummy System depicts Nerv as an evil organization that is difficult to trust, following and amplifying the trend inaugurated by the anime series Mobile Suit Gundam, which in 1979 proposed a scenario questioning the classic model of the good and righteous against bad guys. Álvaro Arbonés compared Anno's violence and brutality to the works of Yoshiyuki Tomino, particularly Space Runaway Ideon, with which Evangelion shares a tragic and "dark" atmosphere. Virginie Nebbia also said the gory, blood-filled scenes of the battle destroy the expectations of the classic mecha audience. According to Nebbia, the conflict between Gendo and Shinji represents a generational divide, in which Gendo's idea that the end justifies the means conflicts with Shinji's youthful idealism and rebellion.

== Reception ==
"Ambivalence" was first broadcast on January 31, 1996, and drew a 9.6% audience share on Japanese television. In 1996, it ranked sixteenth among the best anime episodes of the Anime Grand Prix, a large annual poll made by Animage. In July 2020, Comic Book Resources reported an 8.9/10 rating for the episode on IMDb, making it second among the highest-rated Evangelion episodes. Merchandise based on the episode, including a line of official T-shirts, has been released.

"Ambivalence" proved controversial. According to Nikkei Business Publications, and the writers Kazuhisa Fujie and Martin Foster, the depiction of violence was criticized as being "unsuitable on an anime show that is viewed by children". Kenneth Lee of Anime News Network, in a review of the series, criticized the script and characterizations in this part of the series. Lee noted there is a similarity between Gendo's and Shinji's stubbornnesses; Shinji is willing to die for his beliefs and is nearly killed by Toji's Eva; despite these "frightening and interesting" parallels between the characters, according to Lee, these parallels remain "inconclusive". Akio Nagatomi of The Anime Café criticized the script, which he said has "more holes than Swiss cheese". Nagatomi criticized the decision to reveal the identity of Eva-03's pilot at the end and Eva-03's airlift "plain idiotic" symbolism. Despite this, Nagatomi praised Kotono Mitsuishi's performance as Misato and the direction, saying: "It's tight, it's suspenseful, and it's very disturbing to watch".

Other reviewers were more appreciative. GameFan magazine praised "Fourth Child" and "Ambivalence", rating them an A for the story. Digitally Obsessed's Joel Cunningham also gave "Ambivalence" a positive review, saying: "it blends great action and animation with touching character moments and stirring drama". Rhett Intiago of Comic Book Resources criticized Shinji's hesitation before Eva-03, citing it as one of the actions by which Shinji "ruined his likability": "If Shinji had just taken care of things himself, he could have tried to stop the Angel without harming Toji/Asuka, but he chose to do nothing". Edward Lequin of the same site, in contrast, cited the battle among the moments when the viewer sympathizes with Shinji, calling it "heartbreaking". Newtype magazine praised Hikari's portrayal as a young woman who is in love with Toji, describing it as "heartwarming". Anime News Network's Brian Stremick reported that with "Ambivalence" anime fans were shown "in no uncertain terms that despite the time slot it was airing in and the lightness of the episodes after Asuka was introduced, that this could no longer be considered a kids show".

The action scenes have been generally praised by critics. Screen Rant, Game Rant, and Comic Book Resources cited the battle against Bardiel as among the most "disturbing" and best moments in Neon Genesis Evangelion. SyFy Wire's Daniel Dockery listed the battle among the series' "most awesome moments", while the Supanova Expo website cited Shinji's refusal to fight as one of the character's best moments, describing it as a noble choice. Collider's Jeremy Urquhart ranked "Ambivalence" seventh among the best animated television episodes ever; according to Urquhart, although Evangelion is divisive in itself, it is unlikely to have had the same lasting impact without "Ambivalence". Film School Rejects' Max Covill placed "Ambivalence" first on his list of the best Evangelion episodes, describing it as "a landmark episode of anime featuring images that will be forever etched into viewers' minds". Covill also listed several frames from "Ambivalence" as some of the "perfect shots" of Evangelion, including the image of Eva-03 walking with the sunset behind it. The website Kotaku cited "Ambivalence" as one of the series' best episodes. Yahoo! website similarly ranked it as the best Neon Genesis Evangelion episode.
