= Introjection (Neon Genesis Evangelion) =

- Neon Genesis Evangelion episode
- Eva-01 devouring Angel Zeruel.
- Episode no.: Episode 19
- Directed by: Masayuki
- Written by: Hideaki Anno, Akio Satsukawa
- Original air date: February 7, 1996
- Running time: 22 minutes

Episode chronology
← Previous "Ambivalence"	Next → "Weaving a Story 2: oral stage"

"Introjection" (Note: Japanese: 男の戰い, Hepburn: Otoko no tatakai; lit. 'A Man's Battle') is the nineteenth episode of the Japanese anime television series Neon Genesis Evangelion, which was created by animation studio Gainax. Hideaki Anno and Akio Satsukawa wrote the episode, which animator Masayuki directed. The series' protagonist is Shinji Ikari, a teenage boy whose father Gendo recruited him to the special military organization Nerv to pilot a gigantic biomechanical mecha named Evangelion into combat against beings called Angels. In the episode, Shinji conflicts with his father and leaves Nerv. As he is about to leave Tokyo 3, Angel Zeruel attacks the city, defeating Asuka Langley Soryu's Eva-02 and Rei Ayanami's Eva-00. Shinji again boards his Eva-01, which goes berserk and devours Zeruel.

During the production of "Introjection", animator Takeshi Honda gave the female characters a youthful touch. The episode reprises several situations and frames from the first episodes of the series to show Shinji's growth and maturation. The installment includes cultural references to the manga artist Daijirō Morohoshi, the Japanese anime series Ultraman, Buddhism, and Christianity. The episode's title refers to the eponymous psychological concept.

"Introjection" was first broadcast on TV Tokyo on February 7, 1996, and drew an eight-percent audience share on Japanese television. Critics praised the episode for its direction and action sequences, considering it one of the best episodes of the series. Merchandise based on "Introjection" has been released.

== Plot ==
Shinji Ikari, pilot of the mecha Eva-01, protests against his father Gendo, commander of the special agency Nerv. Gendo used his Eva-01 to destroy Bardiel, the thirteenth of a series of humanity's enemies called Angels. During the battle, the mecha Eva-03 has also been destroyed, despite the mecha containing its pilot, Toji Suzuhara, Shinji's friend. Shinji is stopped by Nerv operators and decides to leave Nerv. Meanwhile, Toji awakens after the battle against Bardiel with his left leg amputated. Misato Katsuragi, the head of Nerv's strategic department, greets Shinji, telling him she has placed her hope in him. As Shinji stands on the station platform about to leave Tokyo-3, the Angel Zeruel attacks the city. Asuka Soryu Langley, the pilot aboard Eva-02, attempts to stop Zeruel, but it easily defeats the mecha.

Asuka's fellow pilot Rei Ayanami aboard Eva-00 takes an explosive device and launches a surprise kamikaze attack, attempting to hit Zeruel's core, but she is also defeated. Shinji witnesses the battle and meets Asuka's guardian, Ryoji Kaji, and tells him humanity would be destroyed if an Angel were to make contact with an entity called Adam, which is kept in Nerv headquarters. Shinji confronts his father, re-boards Eva-01, and fights Zeruel. During the battle, Eva-01 runs out of power, and Zeruel launches an attack on Eva-01's core. As Shinji cries out in despair, Eva-01 reactivates, defeating and devouring Zeruel, absorbing their S^{2} engine in the process.

== Production ==
=== Genesis and staff ===
In 1993, Gainax wrote a presentation document entitled New Century Evangelion (tentative name) Proposal (新世紀エヴァンゲリオン (仮) 企画書, Shinseiki Evangelion (kari) kikakusho) for Neon Genesis Evangelion. The Proposal included a description of the fifteenth episode, in which Unit 01 would be heavily damaged, then remodeled and upgraded. Elements of the episode plan were used in "Introjection", in which Zeruel damages Eva-01 and absorbs the Angels' S² engine. In Proposal's nineteenth episode, Asuka was to injure herself in an attempt to protect Shinji, who would try to prove himself, and the first air battle of the series would occur. In the final version, Zeruel mutilates Eva-02; Asuka is defeated, but she does not attempt to protect Shinji. The plan also included a change in the relationship between Shinji and Asuka, a scenario that was later presented in the movie The End of Evangelion (1997), and a cuboid origami Angel would change shape in a manner similar to a Möbius strip. At the time, production of a television series did not allow Anno to use the idea, but he used paper-like arm elements for Zeruel and for Armisael in "Rei III".

The series staff originally planned an ending in which twelve final enemies called Apostolos, the most powerful ever seen, would appear from the Moon, like the Twelve Apostles of the New Testament. Evangelion Chronicle, an official encyclopedia about the series, links this initial scenario to Zeruel, the most powerful Angel to appear in all of Neon Genesis Evangelion, being the twelfth enemy to appear and attack Tokyo-3 since the third Angel Sachiel. The scenario also included an enhancement to Evangelion units in the second half of the series; Eva-01 was to be strengthened using the power of the Apostolos. The Proposal document also mentions a "positron engine" that was to equip Evangelion units; this later became the S^{2} engine in the final version of the anime. The staff included a description of Ryoji Kaji in the document; he is thought of as a positive influence on Shinji's path, and encourages him with words that help him grow. This element is found in the scene in which Kaji encourages Shinji in "Introjection". Staff also originally wanted Kaji to die in the nineteenth episode. The episode's original draft called for Kaji to tell Shinji that if an Angel managed to remove the Spear of Longinus from Adam, it would trigger the Third Impact. Shinji would then have heard Asuka urge him to act like a man, Misato tell him to decide for himself what to do, and Ayanami reprimand him for continuing to run away from unpleasant things. Kaji would then have remarked, "The women have already told you. I won't force you". The original plan also called for a scene in which Gendo accepted Shinji as Eva-01's pilot and asked him to board the Eva. During the battle, Shinji would have screamed in horror as he witnessed Eva-01's true form. Overcome with nausea, he would have covered his mouth and seen Eva-01's hand stained with blood, briefly superimposing the image of his own blood-covered hand onto it.

Hideaki Anno, Neon Genesis Evangelion's main director, and Akio Satsukawa wrote "Introjection". Masayuki, the series' assistant director, worked on storyboards and direction; the other assistant directors were Ken Ando and Masahiko Otsuka. Takeshi Honda was the chief animator, while Yoshito Asari and Masayuki worked as assistant character designers. The staff included animators Yasushi Muraki, Hiroaki Aida, Shoichi Masuo, Mitsuo Iso, experts in action mecha anime, and Takashi Hashimoto. Production also involved other studios besides Gainax, including Studio Cockpit, FAI International, Studio Tarji, and Tatsunoko Color Center.

=== Writing ===
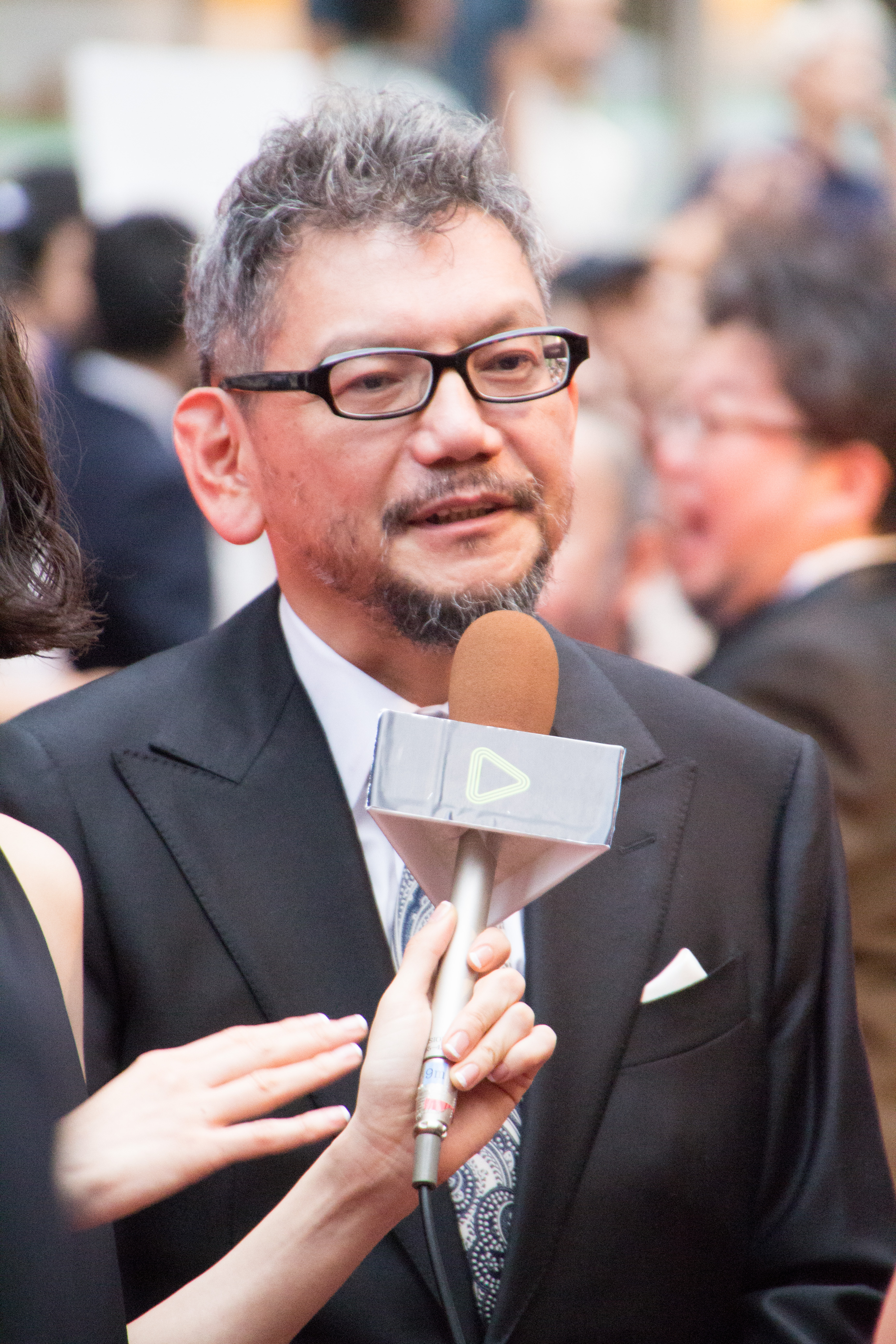
Neon Genesis Evangelion director Hideaki Anno

In the previous episode, "Ambivalence", Toji Suzuhara is injured in the clash with Bardiel, and in "Introjection", he is depicted in a hospital room with an amputated left leg. The indication was not in the storyboard, but was given only at the animation stage. Anno originally wanted to kill Toji, but he promised during the production of the series his friend Toshimichi Ōtsuki, a representative of King Records, not to kill minor characters. This event is related to Anno's personal experience; his father, Takuyo Anno, lost his left leg in a youthful accident with a power saw and was forced to wear a prosthesis for the rest of his life. Hideaki Anno himself said in an interview that he experienced firsthand the burden of his father's inferiority complex over his physical disability and that its consequences profoundly shaped him. Following the accident, Anno developed a fascination with deformity, believing he could love only something that is stumpy. Furthermore, in Tetsujin 28-go, a show Anno watched as a child, a robot loses an arm; for this reason, Anno included scenes in which mechas are cruelly mutilated in his works. During "Introjection", Eva-02 loses both arms, while Eva-01 loses its left arm. The episode also contrasts Toji's permanently amputated leg with Eva-01, which regenerates its severed arm, emphasizing the difference between humans and Evangelions. Academic scholar River Seager described the result as "eerie and gothic, often blurring the line between the genres of mecha and horror". The episode also introduces the concept of Eva-01's "awakening". Rather than the everyday verb mezameru (目覚める), it uses the more literary term kakusei (覚醒). In an interview, critic Oizumi Sanenari asked director Anno whether the choice of kakusei reflected the concept of Kundalini awakening promoted by the Aum Shinrikyō sect, which had become the focus of intense public attention following the Tokyo subway sarin attack during the series' original broadcast. Anno replied that the resemblance stemmed from "subliminality or imprinting", arguing that he had unconsciously absorbed that kind of language from the cultural atmosphere of the time; he also said that he chose this and other literary Japanese expressions simply because he liked the way they sounded and out of a sense of pedantry.

The second half of the series suffered from a tight schedule and production delays, and staff deviated from the original plans. Gainax had completed only twelve episodes by the time the series began airing after nearly two years of production, leaving the staff to produce the remaining fourteen in just six months—roughly one-third of the time they had spent on the first twelve. The disastrous production schedule drastically reduced the number of available animation cels, leading to a corresponding decline in animation quality and provoking disagreements among the series' staff. Since the episodes were delivered at the last minute, the series' broadcaster TV Tokyo could not check them before airing. "Introjection" increases the show's violence, including a bloody fight in which an Eva unit eats Zeruel. According to writer Virginie Nebbia, Anno had earlier used this strategy for his previous anime series Nadia: The Secret of Blue Water, but for Evangelion it was only partially the result of the authors' will. The staff had planned to animate a large-scale battle for the finale, but around "Introjection" they realized that they could no longer animate action scenes. Gainax therefore had to choose between telling the story through dialogue alone or presenting it with recycled, low-quality footage. Gainax's goal was to achieve the greatest possible effect with the least possible effort. Despite difficulties caused by the timing and the departure of some staff members, the staff of the series produced work of a certain quality until "Introjection". According to Anno, the staff still worked together for the installment. "Introjection" therefore became the last battle the staff animated with virtually all of its remaining resources. Around the same time, Anno also decided how to end the series. Anno compared the episode's production to a live concert in which the staff did what they thought "was best for the moment", saying, "We give top priority to cost performance". According to Evangelion assistant director Kazuya Tsurumaki, the episode reflects Anno's writing style, which is deductive rather than inductive; Anno does not have the final destination in mind, except vaguely, but gradually chooses the path to take.

Shinji was initially supposed to achieve a 400% synchronization rate by "The Beast", the second episode of the series. However, Iso suggested a gradual progression of synchronization to the director. As a starting point, Iso created a scene in which Shinji illegally installs an antenna, even though outside TV reception is formally prohibited in Tokyo-3, and watches a program in which his father Gendo is being questioned in parliament on suspicion of having killed his wife Yui through illegal experiments. For Iso, this could have been the trigger that would have shaken Gendo's image as an "excessively powerful" father. A similar scene was later inserted into the episode "Splitting of the Breast", in which Shinji, in an internal monologue, overhears people discussing his mother's death in Eva-01 and his father's presumed guilt. Iso conceived of "Introjection" as a turning point within the series. He created a draft that spanned several episodes, starting with a conventional plot and the assumption that Shinji would mature and finally be able to pilot the Eva freely. Mobile Suit Gundam already featured a similar story of Amuro Ray, who goes from being a shy boy to defeating his enemies in battle. Furthermore, in the original storyboards, Shinji was supposed to be undecided about whether or not to board Eva-01; the women around him would have joined together to try to convince him, and Shinji would eventually agree. However, Iso suggested the director depict a completely isolated Shinji who would have to agree to pilot Eva-01 of his own free will. The scene with the women was later cut from the script; however, Iso stated that he doesn't know whether the cut was actually due to his discussion with the director. In the final version of events, however, even after the battle against Zeruel, Shinji again experiences doubts, undecided whether or not to board Eva-01 or flee, while Iso's project had a coherent and conventional maturation. Anno, on the other hand, identified with Shinji and created something new. According to Iso, Neon Genesis Evangelion is not a conventional Gundam-style story in which Shinji becomes an invincible man and defeats the enemy. Iso compared this change of direction to the situation in Japan in the 1990s, marked by the Japanese asset price bubble, the Tokyo subway sarin attack, and the 1995 Hanshin earthquake; for Iso, at that time, there was already a sense that "an era was coming to an end".

In Iso's original plans, Misato would have tried to dissuade Shinji, who was locked inside Eva-01 in protest at the beginning of the episode, in a comical style similar to his work Den-noh Coil. Gendo and Shinji would have fought each other after Toji's accident in the previous episode, only to be stopped by Kaji. Following his protest, Shinji was to be interrogated by high-ranking government officials. The interrogation scene was conceived as a response to the clichés of conventional animated series: in Mobile Suit Gundam, for example, the Gundam RX-78 seems to become Amuro's property, but the mecha is actually an expensive weapon built with someone else's capital. Iso's original draft also included a scene in which Shinji, after losing consciousness, would dream of his mother Yui holding Toji's hand; upon awakening, Toji would say that he too had dreamed of Yui, and that Shinji's mother and his mother look alike. The scene was ultimately scrapped, but received praise from Yoshiyuki Sadamoto, the series' character designer. Shinji's sensei, a guardian to whom the boy is entrusted after his separation from his father, was also supposed to appear at one point. In another draft by Iso, Kaji was supposed to leave for China with Shinji's Eva-01 as an escort; however, during the trip, there would have been an enemy attack by an Angel. China was prominent in Iso's original script; Iso himself went to Shanghai between 1993 and 1994 for a project for Madhouse animation studio and saw a country full of rising buildings, imagining a Cold War between China and the United States in the future. For another episode, Iso drew a sequence in which an Angel invades Nerv headquarters and falls into the void, with anti-aircraft guns intercepting it; the drawings were later reused for "Introjection" and Zeruel's attack. Kaji himself would have attempted to defeat the Angel aboard a plane, only to be shot down. During Kaji's death, depicted covered in blood against a clear blue sky, Shinji was supposed to be told, "Humanity doesn't matter. You decide". Kaji's death would have represented a turning point in Shinji's development. However, Iso felt that using another character's death to further Shinji's development was wrong, so he suggested making Kaji's death merely apparent, with the character reappearing in subsequent episodes.

=== Development and style ===
Takeshi Honda gave an aesthetically pleasing look to the female characters, including Ritsuko Akagi, who is usually depicted as a cold woman, giving her a young, teenage appearance instead. Yoshito Asari conceived the design of the Angel Zeruel, which is similar to that of Sachiel and was inspired by the image of a shinigami, a Japanese god of death. The producers asked Asari to portray an enemy that is seemingly slow and clumsy, but is fast enough and strong enough to taunt the Evangelion. Kaichiro Morikawa, a Japanese architect and writer, noted in "Introjection", Rei Ayanami is again blindfolded following the battle against Bardiel in "Ambivalence", as in the first episode, "Angel Attack". Asuka suffered similar damage to Rei's against Zeruel, but she emerges almost unscathed. Misato and Ritsuko are covered with bandages while Toji remains injured. According to the writer Morikawa, there would be no reason to present Rei bandaged, except as a matter of style and character design. For Morikawa, the bandages do not represent Rei's physical wounds but symbolize her position as a "warrior". Morikawa also noted Hayao Miyazaki's Nausicaä of the Valley of the Wind (1984), on which Anno worked as an animator, features wounded characters. During "Introjection", characters are shown in a neurological hospital. For Morikawa, such scenes are distinguished by a pale-colored uniform; although there are occasional announcements by operators in the background, the sound design emphasizes electronic equipment such as electrocardiograms, giving the idea of a cold clinic that treats people as objects.

The staff inserted an introspective scene set in a train, using a wide-angle, backlit screen layout. The idea of the dreamy train was suggested by assistant director Tsurumaki, and was first presented in "Splitting of the Breast"; Anno liked the idea, and decided to include it in "Introjection" as well. The fictional New Hakone-Yumoto Station, which appears in "Introspection" and is first seen in "Hedgehog's Dilemma", is based on the real Hakone-Yumoto Station. For this episode, the staff conceived an alternative route of the Odakyū line that connects Tokyo, Shinjuku, Kanagawa, and Hakone-Yumoto, because in the world of Neon Genesis Evangelion, old Tokyo is submerged as a result of the Second Impact and the consequent rise in sea level. Writer River Seager noted Anno showed an interest in trains since his short film At the Bus Stop (1980) and Mobile Suit Gundam: Char's Counterattack (1988); the symbol of the train then returns in Anno's next work, Love & Pop (1998). Seager argued that trains have fused the themes of death and modernity in Japanese media since Kenji Miyazawa's novel Night on the Galactic Railroad, which was adapted into an anime film by Gisaburō Sugii and possibly influenced Galaxy Express 999. Trains thus became a site of isolation, loneliness, and the desire to run away; however, in Anno's cinematography, train stations also offer the hope for growth and change, as in the final scene of "Hedgehog's Dilemma".

Mitsuo Iso worked with Takeshi Honda on the confrontation between Eva-01 and Zeruel. Academic and writer Stevie Suan noted Zeruel's battle lacks the classic movements of mecha anime sequences, which often mimic human combat, with "sword slashes and gun blasts", while Eva-01 instead devours the Angel through beastly movements. In the final version of the episode, Eva-01 absorbs Zeruel's S^{2} engine, but no frame in the anime shows its true form, which remains a mystery. The original episode script includes a scene in which Eva-01 extracts an organ that is referred to in the storyboards as the S^{2} engine. Eva-01's cannibalistic act negatively represents the act of eating flesh. This detail can be linked to Anno's personal experience; he has been a vegetarian since early adolescence and is accustomed to including this aspect of his life in his works. The character of Rei, for example, is also a vegetarian. According to the writer Virginie Nebbia, the battle "gets rid of some taboos, such as cannibalism". Zeruel's attack on Eva-01's core was also inspired by an image of a rape. In an interview, Anno stated he included the cannibalism scene in an attempt to traumatize a young child and make him vomit; according to him, sex and violence are normal parts of human life, so it is better to show violence and "repulsive things" to children as they really are. From the outset, while discussing the project with the TV Tokyo producer during planning meetings, Anno tried to avoid placing too many restrictions on the series' content; he argued that programs aimed at children should contain "a little poison" so that they could help viewers build resistance and prepare for the harsher realities of life. Writer Álvaro Arbonés compared Anno's violence and brutality to the works of Yoshiyuki Tomino, particularly Space Runaway Ideon, with which Evangelion shares a tragic and "dark" atmosphere. Nebbia also noted the battle is reminiscent of the confrontations of Akio Jissōji, the director of several Ultraman episodes, because the viewer sees Eva-01 eating behind black spruces.

Kōichi Yamadera, Miyuki Matsushita, Kōichi Nagano, Junko Iwao, and Tetsuya Iwanaga provided voices for several of the show's main characters, and also played unidentified characters and Nerv operators in "Introjection". British singer Claire Littley sang the episode's closing theme, a version of the song "Fly Me To The Moon"; this was replaced on home-video editions with a new version called "Normal Orchestra", which was sung by Kotono Mitsuishi, Megumi Hayashibara, and Yūko Miyamura.

== Cultural references ==
The episode's title, "Introjection", is a reference to the eponymous concept in psychoanalysis; the term denotes the act of incorporating other people's characteristics and feelings, and making them one's own. The title refers to Shinji's maturation and his new awareness of his ego, and the process of Zeruel's absorption by Eva-01. According to the book Evangelion Glossary (エヴァンゲリオン用語事典, Evangerion Yougo Jiten), which was edited by Yahata Shoten, the term can also relate to the episode's plot on several levels. After watching the defeat of Eva-00 and Eva-02, Shinji declares he is "the pilot of Eva-01" as a result of incorporating "another Self", that is, his self as a pilot, and the values of his father Gendo. Eva-01 reactivates after incorporating Shinji's request for help. The book also notes that in psychoanalytic theory, it is through introjection that the superego—the part of the psyche that results from parental and social norms—is formed. Shinji, who in "Ambivalence" refused to fight Bardiel, later kills Kaworu Nagisa in the last episodes of the series, having introjected Gendo's parental norm of the necessity of making sacrifices in war in the episode. During Rei's attempted suicide, a soundtrack called "Thanatos" is audible; the name Thanatos is a reference to the Greek god of death. In psychoanalysis, Thanatos denotes the death drive, the instinct to destroy others and oneself.

The anime critic Akio Nagatomi noted Eva-01 devouring Zeruel is modeled after primates, tracing a possible influence from Stanley Kubrick's movie 2001: A Space Odyssey (1968). When Gendo attempts to activate Eva-01 with the Dummy System, he says "tomaruhachi (ヒトマルハチ)", a military expression that is used to prevent misunderstandings when pronouncing numbers, particularly the number 108. According to Yahata Shoten's Evangelion Glossary, in Buddhism, 108 is the number of human desires, and is likened to an image of "pearls and mirrors". The image of the out-of-control Unit 01, which walks on four legs while devouring an Angel, was inspired by the Buddhist figures of the preta, damned people who are punished for their earthly sins with eternal hunger.

"Introjection" was influenced by the genre series tokusatsu, of which Anno is a fan. Zeruel's explosive eye-beam technique is similar to Ultraman Jettle from the Ultraman franchise. The writer Virginie Nebbia has linked the Angel and its role to Zetton, an Ultraman antagonist who appears in the least episodes of the series of the same name. In the first Ultraman series finale, Zetton causes a separation between Ultraman and the human Shin Hayata, and defeats Ultraman, contrary to the audience's expectation. According to Nebbia, in the fight against Zeruel, the Evangelion staff demonstrate a desire to thwart audience expectations; the hero refuses to fight, the series mecha contains his mother, and the Angels—the show's villains—are portrayed as the rightful inhabitants of Earth. In contrast to Zetton, Shinji manages to defeat and eat his enemy, fusing with Eva-01 in the process. Nebbia also compared Zeruel's cross-shaped explosions, which Sachiel also uses in the first two episodes, to Daijirō Morohoshi's Yokai Hunter. In the third installment of Yokai Hunter, Zezu, a "Christ-savior" takes stricken souls from Hell to Heaven as a giant cross hovers in the sky.

In the battle against Zeruel, Eva-01 devours its S^{2} engine, extending its operational power to become infinite. The full name means Super-Solenoid; it is named after the solenoid, a cylindrical coil that produces a magnetic force. According to the Evangelion Glossary, it's an engine "powered by the energy generated by the annihilation of positrons and electrons". It gives great powers to the Angels. Writers Martin Foster and Kazuhisa Fujie described it as a "perpetual engine". Scholar Luka Perušić similarly described the S^{2} engine as a device that gives infinite power, "an infinite source of energy to exist and sustain itself". Evangelion Chronicle magazine likened the S^{2} engine to a perpetual motion machine, such as the Archimedean spiral, believed to be incompatible with the laws of thermodynamics, and to the DNA supercoil, particularly the solenoid structure of chromatin. The same magazine also compared it with the anthropic principle, according to which there is a hidden energy in genes that has advanced life.

For humanity, S^{2} engine represents a "forbidden fruit". Evangelion Chronicle and Kazuhisa Fujie linked the engine to the Biblical fruit of life, while academic Fabio Bartoli compared it with the tree of life. According to Comic Book Resources, Evangelion's fruit of life vaguely implies a relationship with the Fruit of the Holy Spirit, suggesting: "the Angels aren't the villains after all". By eating Zeruel, Unit 01 ascends to a "God status", and the event is "a turning point in the series". The game Neon Genesis Evangelion 2 contains a section named Classified Information with a description of the S^{2} engine, according to which, "As the universe is formed with spirals, the engine acquires energy from its shape, which is the same as DNA". In the liner notes of "Fourth Child" and "Ambivalence", in which S^{2} is discussed, assistant director Tsurumaki linked the anthropic principle to Lyall Watson's hundredth monkey phenomenon, a hypothetical scenario in which consciousness can alter reality and previously nonexistent things can become real the moment it is thought of as real. According to Tsurumaki, quantum physics could also be related to the hundredth monkey phenomenon, which is not to be understood as a rigidly fixed number, and even one person can modify reality, making their dreams true.

== Themes ==
"Introjection" represents the culmination of Shinji's story, and is the third chapter in the trilogy of episodes devoted to the Fourth Children, following "Fourth Child" and "Ambivalence". According to the Japanese academic Taro Igarashi, the installment is also the climax of the second half of the show, in which there is a huge sense of tension and the plot disintegrates and goes out of control like Eva-01. Scholar Sano Yasuyuki described it as a "turning point" in Shinji's path. Protoculture Addicts magazine noted that "the story is really picking up speed" during this arc. According to writer Álvaro Arbonés, while in American TV shows the rhythm usually slows down at this point, Anno does the opposite. In the episode's first scenes, a conversation on a train at sunset is presented, a technique that was also used in the sixteenth installment. Asia Scape magazine interpreted the imaginary train dialogue as a representation of Shinji's "internal argument. For the encyclopedia Evangelion Chronicle, this scene represents the characters' inner worlds, but not Shinji's. Toji is watching the conversation between Shinji and Rei from a distance; according to the encyclopedia, it would be unnatural for Toji to know Shinji's concerns, so it is possible that Shinji, Toji, and Rei are connected through Evangelion units. Rei and Shinji discuss "running away from unpleasant things", a theme that is already discussed in the previous two episodes. In the following scenes, Rei asks Asuka what it means to dream, and Asuka asks her, "You never dreamed?". The official booklet of the Neon Genesis Evangelion: Death and Rebirth movie (1997) describes Rei as "an expressionless Noh mask" and "a girl who does not dream", while the book Schizo Evangelion describes her as "a dreamless mind, completely separated from [Carl] Jung's collective unconscious".

Evangelion Chronicle noted the episode uses the symbolism of hands. The theme of doing things with the "hands of men" has already been presented in earlier episodes, including "A Human Work" and "She said, 'Don't make others suffer for your personal hatred'.". When Shinji meets his father during Zeruel's battle in "Introjection", concern, hesitation, and determination are visible in the movement of Shinji's hands. The symbolism of hands and the variety of emotions that can be expressed through them return often in the series, where people fight with their bare hands or use their hands to strangle others, as in the previous installment's battle or in the movie The End of Evangelion, in which Shinji strangles Asuka, and Rei asks Shinji what his hands are for. Important phrases related to the characters' secrets are presented in "Introjection"; for example, when Eva-01 rejects the Dummy System, Gendo says, "Are you rejecting me?", Rei experiences a feeling of nausea, saying "It is no longer possible." During the battle against Zeruel, Rei also says, "Even if I die, I can be replaced". According to scholar Madeline Ashby, "Rei acknowledges her understanding that she is a clone" with this line. Gendo, who is usually depicted as calm and aloof, shows concern at Rei's suicidal strategy, hinting at strong feelings toward Rei. According to academic Stevie Suan, Rei operates according to her own volition in the battle, even against her orders, showing Rei has the ability "to act and induce effects".

=== Shinji's growth ===
"Introjection" represents various situations and shots from the first episodes of the series to show Shinji's personal growth

In the episode's first scene, after the battle against Bardiel in the previous installment, Shinji childishly protests against his father, saying he does not care if Gendo's actions were necessary. According to the writer Michael Berman, Shinji threatens to destroy Nerv because he was forced to kill the Angel regardless of the captive's survival, and "most disparaging for Shinji is that he was unwillingly used as an instrument for his father's purpose". After the event, Shinji decides to quit Nerv and stop piloting the Eva. In the fourth episode, "Hedgehog's Dilemma", Shinji momentarily escaped from Nerv; the decision he makes in "Introjection", rather than being an escape from reality, is based on his own conscious will and greater maturity instead. Misato herself, in the course of her encounter with Shinji, notices he speaks with true self-awareness, something he had never done before. "Introjection" reprises several shots and situations from the first, second, and fourth episodes, clearly showing Shinji's evolution. For example, when Shinji confronts his father at the Nerv base, the same shots from the first episode are used, but the dialogue is reverted, and Shinji affirms himself as a pilot. As in the first two episodes, an Angel similar to Sachiel generates cross-shaped explosions, and after going berserk, Eva-01 repairs its left arm. This led the series' assistant director, Kazuya Tsurumaki, to describe Evangelion as a story of repetition.

According to the writer Dennis Redmond, for the first time in the series Shinji "claims an explicit identity" in "Introjection". Newtype noted Shinji "has seemed lost and isolated up to now"; at the beginning of the series, he drives the Eva as if he was removed from his surroundings, while he rises with his strong will in "Introjection". According to critic Max Covill, Shinji finally becomes the hero he was once envisioned to be; while throughout the series he is indecisive, Shinji is able to stand up to his father and make decisions for himself in this episode. For scholars Laura Cabassa and Matteo Caparrini, Shinji accepts "that both external conditions and his heart drive him to the field of battle". Kazuya Tsurumaki noted that despite the common perception of Shinji as a boy who, unlike the classical hero, never grows up, "you can see several milestones in Shinji's growth that you wouldn't mind seeing as the final episode", including "Rei II" and "Introjection". According to Tsurumaki, "Introjection" would be the last episode of a good classic mecha anime, but Shinji's journey continues: "When you think about it, it's not that Shinji hasn't grown up. It's just that there's an even tougher development waiting for him, and he repeatedly worries and gets lost."

As noted by Tsurumaki, as Zeruel attacks, Shinji is on a hill look⁣ing at Tokyo-3, saying to him⁣self "I won't pilot", but in the next scene he is in the under⁣ground shelter. Tsurumaki said Shinji's body gradually approaches Unit-01. In addi⁣tion, there is a lack of visual in⁣for⁣ma⁣tion char⁣ac⁣ter⁣is⁣tic of other anime. For ex⁣am⁣ple, there is the sky be⁣hind the character, but no in⁣for⁣ma⁣tion is given out⁣side of that. His inter⁣pre⁣ta⁣tion was that, "even though Shinji was say⁣ing he wouldn't pilot, he also un⁣der⁣stood that he had to pilot". For Tsurumaki, Shinji simply acts like a little child rebelling against a parent in "Introjection" and reported his interpretation to Anno, who disagreed and replied that Shinji really does not want to pilot in the scene. Tsurumaki thus concluded Shinji is not as weak as is commonly perceived; he is obstinate and "doesn't really pay attention to other people", just like Anno. Shinji's first English voice actor Spike Spencer similarly noted Shinji has not completely taken "the weak path" because "when he gets in the Evangelion, he kicks ass", and by the nineteenth episode, he lets go of his emotions: "You can't discount the fact that he's kind of a wuss when it comes to girls and talking to other people, but he's a warrior. ... The world's still here, and it's thanks to him." Scholar Yuuki Namba noted that Shinji "decides to risk his life and fight to protect those around him". Writer Walter Veit similarly said that Shinji gathers "his courage", owning for the first time his pilot role as his identity.

After his resignation, Shinji sees a battle from an outside perspective as a civilian for the first time; he sees Eva-02 and Eva-00 being defeated by Zeruel. While Shinji is "uncertain about the path to follow", he meets Ryoji Kaji and talks with him. According to Redmond, Kaji "says the crucial words" Gendo "cannot bring himself to say". Newtype's official filmbooks on Evangelion noted that characters rarely express their feelings in the series, but Kaji still speaks to Shinji by voicing his emotions. Through Kaji's discussion, Shinji develops an insight into things for the first time. According to scholar Claudio Cordella, Kaji's words make Shinji temporarily overcome his solipsism. Kaji urges Shinji by inviting him to decide for himself without external constraints. Unlike the previous episodes, in which Shinji states to ride Eva is to have his father's approval, Shinji decides to pilot again for himself, not for Gendo's affection. According to Hideaki Anno, the phrase is a spur to the Japanese people to be more "individualistic". Mechademia Mariana Ortega also described Kaji as an "adopted father-figure" for Shinji. Shinji's heart is shaken by Kaji's words and Rei's sacrificial action; after his conversation with Kaji, he runs toward Nerv with no trace of hesitation on his face. Instead of being self-centered, Shinji thinks in a broad, third-person perspective and makes his decision. His face is depicted as more mature than in the rest of the series, while Kaji has a peculiar expression on his face during the battle, as though he is thinking about his fate. Anime Feminist writers noticed how Shinji decides to return only to save the other people, even though he has not forgiven Gendo. According to Newtype, Shinji understands who he is in "Introjection", and could be considered a "modern hero", an evolved version of the animated heroes of earlier anime series. For French writer Alexandre Marine, Shinji also learns that "acting in an extreme manner is not healthy" in the episode.

=== Masculinity and deconstruction of the mecha genre ===
The episode's Japanese title, "A Man's Battle", can be linked with the theme of masculinity, which is also presented in previous episodes. Yūichirō Oguro, the editor of supplemental materials included in the Japanese edition of the series, especially noted how Misato repeats to Shinji to act like a man in the first two episodes. In "Splitting of the Breast", Shinji says fighting is "a man's job" but becomes trapped in Leliel and the Eva-01 Entry Plug as a punishment or a castration for trying to act like a man. Toji, who espouses macho ideals, is metaphorically castrated by losing a leg in "Ambivalence". According to Oguro, a similar negative and skeptical view of masculinity is presented in "Introjection". He also noted how Eva-01 with Yui's soul is the one who defeats the Angel, and not the male protagonist, so it is not exactly "a man's battle". According to the academic Cristopher Smith, after the battle against Bardiel, Shinji has seen where the performance of violent hegemonic masculinity ultimately leads, and initially concludes it is not something he desires nor which is aligned with his own masculinity: "Exposure to extreme hegemonic masculine violence leads Shinji to finally reject both it and the patriarchal organization run by his father". Smith also noted for the first time in the series, Shinji later performs exceptional violence in "Introjection", in which he repeats some of the violent actions his father had forced him to perform earlier in "Ambivalence", as "He has a deranged look on his face as he does it. ... Now he has realized the depravity of hegemonic masculinity and the violence it requires, but here he indulges in that depravity with full awareness."

During the battle, Eva-01 emits a roar similar to that of a carnivorous animal. For the writer Giuseppe Gatti, Eva-01 resembles the posture of "a mammoth gorilla-cyborg"; scholar Stevie Suan similarly stated that the scene gives a "sense of a primal, savage character". The New Yorker wrote, in awakening his Eva, Shinji unlocks "a monstrous, destructive id synonymous with—or derived from—his own". According to GameRant, while Eva-01 going berserk "ensure[s] victory more often than not, it's a haunting subversion of the mecha trope". The writers Brian Camp and Julie Davis similarly stated Eva-01's fury makes audiences ask "what's really in these machines". According to the academic Mariana Ortega, since Eva-01 was built from Lilith and the Angel was born from Adam, Unit 01 absorbs a "sibling" and becomes an "alpha et omega". The Japanese academic Mari Kotani likened the act of cannibalism on Shinji-Eva's part to "the explosion of the radically feminine, that is, to what Alice Jardine calls 'gynesis' ... Shinji very naturally but miraculously comes to feminize himself. This sequence unveils Shinji's epiphany. The more strongly he desires a miraculous breakthrough, the more deconstructive his own sexuality becomes." Writer Sharalyn Orbaugh noted that in the original Japanese, the pronouns used have no indication of Evangelion's gender; it is impossible to tell whether the speakers think of the Shinji-Eva cyborg as "he", "she" or "it". Ritsuko says during the Eva's rampage in "Introjection" that this is the awakening of "her", using the female pronoun and suggesting there is someone inside the Eva.

Shinji, crying in despair, hears a heartbeat and sees a blue light, an image which represents a soul and can be seen in the opening official video. The same blue light can be seen in "Weaving a Story 2: oral stage", and it depicts the first light seen by a newborn child. He eventually completely synchronizes with Eva-01 and becomes absorbed into it. For scholar Andrew M. Winters, Shinji and Eva-01 "have completed their spiritual transformation". According to Orbaugh, despite the hyper-masculine outlines of the Eva unit and the fact that the pilot is a boy, Eva is decisively feminine. Neon Genesis Evangelion's narrative, therefore, uses both the male terror of being radically feminized through the excessive intimacy implied by the interpenetration and the intercorporation of the cyborg subject, and the paradoxical hope that one power that can oppose the forces of evil "is precisely the eruption of the abject femininity that is repressed in technopatriarchal society". According to Suan, the sequence reveals "the isolation and agential capacity of individualism, so distinct it is difficult to relate to, so autonomous it cannot be controlled". Because it is an Eva unit, such a performance reveals the agency of the non-human, dispelling the divisions between humans and non-humans, and "reversing modern conceptions of inanimate object (one that humans can control) and active (human) subject". For the Japanese academic Osamu Tsukihashi, Eva-01's awakening scene may be regarded as the culmination of Evangelion as a work of robotic animation. Unlike an ordinary mecha anime, the battle presence of extreme violence and the obvious dichotomy between good and evil, friend and foe, shifts to the unstable idea "everyone can be an enemy". According to Tsukihashi, the battle corresponds to the ten (転; twist), the third act in the Eastern plot structure of kishōtenketsu.

== Reception ==
"Introjection" was first broadcast on February 7, 1996, and drew an 8% audience share on Japanese television. In 1996, with 566 votes, it ranked fourth among the best anime episodes on the Anime Grand Prix, a large annual poll made by Animage magazine. In July 2020, Comic Book Resources reported a 9.2/10 rating for the installment on IMDb, making it the highest-rated Evangelion episode. Merchandise based on the episode has been released, including a line of official T-shirts, and a sculpture portraying Maya Ibuki's reaction to Eva-01 cannibalism.

The episode has been generally praised by critics, being considered one of the best in the series. Digitally Obsessed's Joel Cunningham gave "Introjection" a positive review for its "real shocker" ending, which he described as "the best moment in the series thus far", and its introspective moments; according to Cunningham, while introspective moments of the series can be boring or confusing to many, they are "a standout example of the risky, unique, and impressive elements of the series", saying: "I can't imagine many other cartoons (even anime) have quite this much character development". The Anime Café's Akio Nagatomi also praised the episode, particularly the manner in which Anno chose to portray Eva-01 devouring Zeruel as "highly effective, with the glowing eyes silhouetted [sic] against the twilight skies sending shivers down my spine". Despite this, Nagatomi described the visual direction as "nothing short of spell-binding", he noted, "The stories seem to be dragging on, as if there's a contractual length to be met, and there's not enough material to fill it". Nagatomi also criticized Megumi Ogata's voice acting, but stated: "the direction of this one episode alone makes following this series worthwhile". Comic Book Resources' Edward Lequin criticized Shinji's decision to quit Nerv because "the Angel might not have gotten that far in the first place if Shinji didn't leave so suddenly".

Reviewers particularly lauded the action scenes from the episode. Game Rant and Comic Book Resources cited the battle against Zeruel as one of the most "disturbing" and best battles in Neon Genesis Evangelion. Game Rant's Sebastián Osío described it as "the most impactful episode of Neon Genesis Evangelion"; according to Osío, "this episode continues to shock new audiences" and "is still as horrific as it was in 1996". The American magazine Anime Invasion ranked it as the eighth-best fight in Japanese animation history. Screen Rant similarly described it as the best battle in the whole series; according to Adam Beach from the same website, the climax, in which "Eva Unit 01 goes completely berserk to destroy Zeruel in a visceral display", makes this confrontation memorable. SyFy Wire's Daniel Dockery listed it among the series' "most awesome moments", while the website Supanova Expo mentioned the scene in which Shinji states himself to be the pilot of Eva-01 in front of his father among the character's best moments. Film School Rejects' Max Covill placed "Introjection" seventh on his list of the best Evangelion episodes, describing it as a "solid episode". Covill also included the shot in which Shinji is in Nerv's prison with Gendo's shadow over him and another shot in which Gendo's sunglasses reflect Shinji's face among the "perfect shots of Neon Genesis Evangelion.
