= Kar =

Kar or KAR may refer to:

- .kar, a file format for karaoke files
- Kar, Iran, in Kurdistan Province
- Kar (beetle), a genus of beetles
- Car (Greek myth)
- Kar (novel), 2002, by Orhan Pamuk
- Kar (political group), a former faction in Afghanistan
- Kar (Turkish music), a genre in Ottoman classical music
- Kar (suffix), surname suffix in India
- Kainic acid receptor, ion channels that respond to neurotransmitters
- Karair, a Finnish airline, by ICAO code
- Killer activation receptor
- King's African Rifles, British Africa colonial regiment, 1902-1960s
- Keilschrifttexte aus Assur religiösen Inhalts, the title of a two-volume German work often abbreviated as KAR
- ISO 639-5 code for Karenic languages
- Kar Nataka or Karnataka, a state in southern India
- Kirby Air Ride, a Nintendo GameCube game from 2003
- Ensio Firearms KAR-21, a Finnish assault rifle.

== See also ==
- Kara (disambiguation)
- Car (disambiguation)
- Khar (disambiguation)
