= Caracara =

Caracara or Carcara may refer to:

== Biology ==
- Caracara (genus), a genus of birds with two recent species
- Caracara (subfamily), a subfamily of birds with five genera
- Cara Cara navel orange

== Art and entertainment ==
- "Caracara" (song), a 2014 song by K.O
- "Carcará", a 1965 single by Maria Bethânia
- Caracara, original title of The Last Witness (1999 film)

== Other uses ==
- Carcará, nickname of Braulio Estima, a Brazilian martial artist
- USS Caracara (AMc-40), a U.S. Navy minesweeper
- Carcara UAV, an unmanned aerial vehicle

== See also ==
- Kara Kara (disambiguation)
- Caracal (disambiguation)
