= The Beginning and the End, or "Knockin' on Heaven's Door" =

"The Beginning and the End, or 'Knockin' on Heaven's Door'"
- Neon Genesis Evangelion episodes
- Eva-01 with Angel Tabris, also known as Kaworu Nagisa.
- Episode nos.: Episodes 24/24'
- Directed by: Masayuki
- Written by: Hideaki Anno, Akio Satsukawa
- Original air date: 13 March 1996
- Running time: 22 minutes (on-air version); 25 minutes (video format version)

Episode chronology
← Previous "Rei III"	Next → "Do you love me?"

"The Beginning and the End, or 'Knockin' on Heaven's Door'" (Note: Japanese: 最後のシ者, Hepburn: Saigo no shisha; lit. 'The Final Messenger') is the twenty-fourth episode of the Japanese anime television series Neon Genesis Evangelion, created by animation studio Gainax. Neon Genesis Evangelion director Hideaki Anno and Akio Satsukawa wrote the episode, while Masayuki served as its director. The episode centers on Shinji Ikari, the pilot of the giant biomechanical Evangelion for the special agency Nerv. Following the psychological collapse of Asuka Langley Soryu, the pilot of Eva-02, Kaworu Nagisa arrives to replace her. Shinji and Kaworu quickly develop a close emotional bond, but Kaworu ultimately reveals himself to be the seventeenth and final member of a race of beings that threaten humanity known as the Angels.

Akio Satsukawa's original screenplay featured considerably stronger homoerotic overtones, including a scene in which Shinji and Kaworu would have swum naked together in a river and kissed. Masayuki reportedly threatened to leave the production over the script. Anno revised the original scenario, considering Satsukawa's original draft excessively explicit. Early drafts also included references to Erich Wolfgang Korngold's play Die tote Stadt and the introduction of a mini-Eva. The production was affected by severe scheduling problems and repeated delays, forcing the staff to complete the work within only a few weeks. Critics have identified references to Christianity and earlier Japanese works, including shōjo manga, Dear Brother and Ultraman.

The episode originally aired on TV Tokyo on 13 March 1996, achieving a nationwide television rating of 6.0%. It was well received by Japanese audiences. Both "The Beginning and the End, or 'Knockin' on Heaven's Door'" and Kaworu ranked among the most popular entries in their respective categories in the annual Anime Grand Prix poll conducted by Animage. The episode received generally positive reviews from both critics and audiences among Western audiences, although Kaworu's introduction sparked extensive debate among scholars and fans over the nature of his relationship with Shinji. Critics have also examined the episode's direction, particularly its use of Ludwig van Beethoven's Ninth Symphony and the prolonged still shot depicting Kaworu in the hand of Eva-01 during one of the episode's final scenes.

== Plot ==
Asuka Langley Soryu, the pilot of Evangelion Unit-02 for the special agency Nerv to fight mysterious beings named Angels, recalls her mother's suicide. Kyoko Zeppelin Soryu, who mistook a doll for her daughter, hanged herself shortly after Asuka had been chosen as Eva-02's pilot. In another flashback, Asuka learns from her fellow pilot Shinji Ikari that her guardian, Ryoji Kaji, has been killed. In the present, Nerv personnel find her catatonic in the ruins of a destroyed house. Meanwhile, Shinji wanders through devastated Tokyo-3 and meets Kaworu Nagisa, Asuka's replacement as Eva-02 pilot. Sent directly by the mysterious Human Instrumentality Committee, Kaworu immediately arouses Nerv's Major Misato Katsuragi's suspicions. Kaworu impresses the Nerv staff with his exceptionally high synchronization rate and tells pilot Rei Ayanami that they are fundamentally alike.

Kaworu and Shinji grow close after meeting at Nerv's public baths, where Kaworu tells Shinji that he deserves affection. The two share a room, and Kaworu says he believes he was born to meet him. Elsewhere, Nerv's Commander Gendo Ikari speaks to Eva-01 as though addressing his late wife, Yui. In the director's cut version, he is shown carrying the embryo of the first Angel, Adam, grafted into his hand. Kaworu secretly contacts Seele, who tells him that humanity has entrusted its hopes to him. Soon afterward, he takes control of Eva-02 without entering its cockpit and descends toward NERV's headquarters' deepest section, the Terminal Dogma. Realizing that Kaworu is an Angel, Shinji pursues him aboard Eva-01. Reaching Terminal Dogma, Kaworu discovers that the crucified giant beneath Nerv headquarters is the second Angel Lilith rather than Adam. Acknowledging humanity's will to live, he abandons his mission and asks Shinji to kill him. Rei silently watches the encounter, revealing that she too possesses an A.T. Field, the defensive energy barrier shared by humans and Angels. After a long hesitation, Shinji kills Kaworu. That night, Misato tells Shinji that only those who possess the will to live can survive.

== Production ==
=== Genesis and staff ===
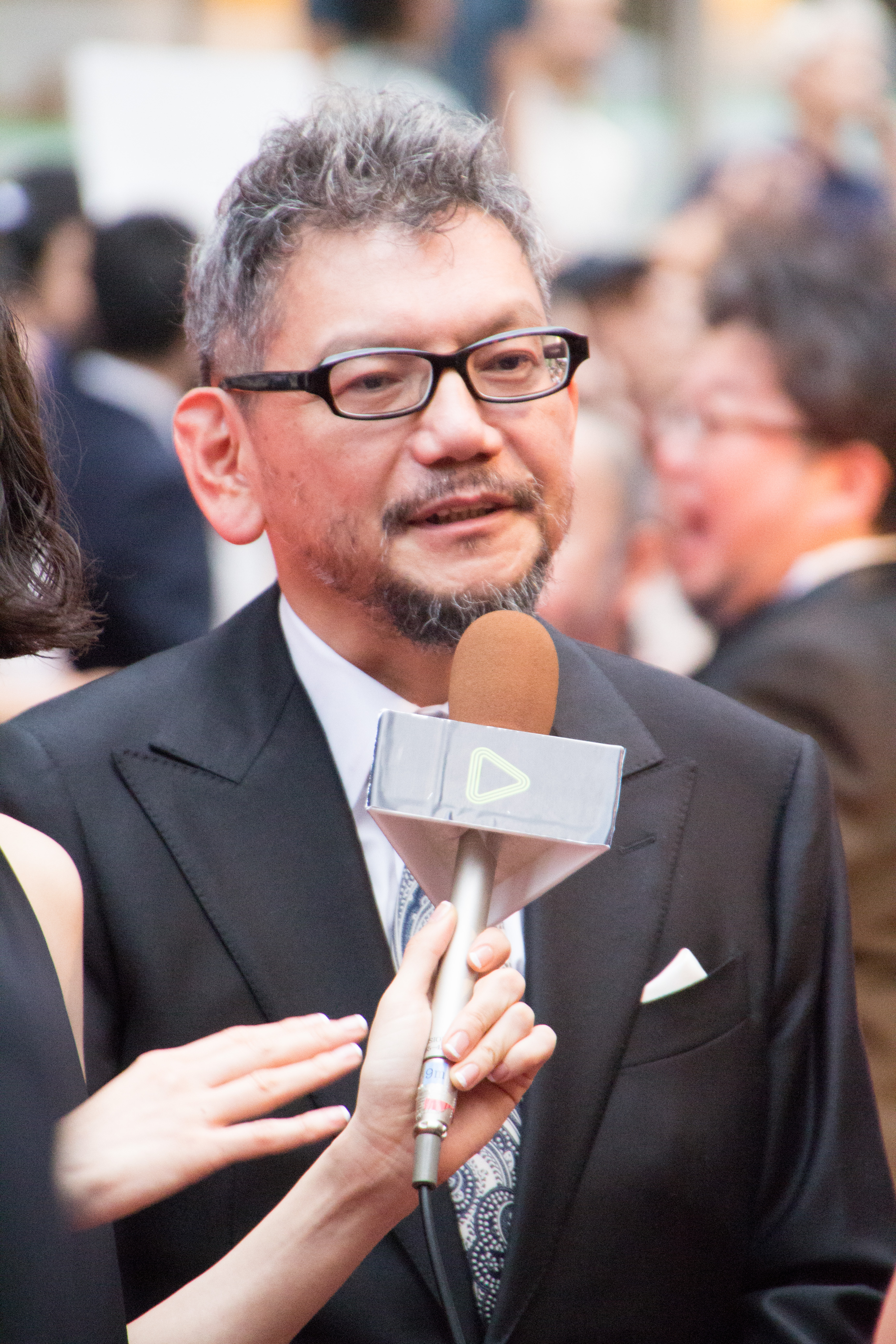
Neon Genesis Evangelion director Hideaki Anno

In 1994, almost two years before the episode aired, animation studio Gainax outlined an early version of the series in a planning document known as the New Century Evangelion (tentative name) Proposal (新世紀エヴァンゲリオン (仮) 企画書, Shinseiki Evangelion (kari) kikakusho) to present the series to potential sponsors. In this draft, the twenty-fourth episode bore the title "Now, the Promised Time" (今、契約時間, ima, keiyaku jikan). Rei was to suffer a mental collapse, and the story would reveal her secrets. Gainax also planned a giant battle as the ending with a final confrontation with the series' last twelve enemies, then called the Apostolos. Evangelion Chronicle noted that the number twelve reflects the twelve Apostles mentioned in the Book of Revelation. Gainax chose the Moon as the setting for the battle because of its symbolic association with Rei and the series' ending theme, "Fly Me to the Moon". The staff also planned to show a message written across the Moon's surface in the final scenes, in a sequence reminiscent of the ending of the OVA series Gunbuster. The twelve Apostolos would descend from the Moon simultaneously, while the entire American continent and Eva-06 would vanish at the same time. Humanity would realize its own helplessness before the twelve enemies in a story of despair and human drama leading to the "promised time", when people would have to "return to nothingness". Gainax ultimately abandoned most of these ideas during production. Evangelion Chronicle compared the initial scenario to Zeruel, the twelfth and strongest Angel to appear in the final version of the series in "Introjection", and the battle between Eva-02 and the Mass Production Models in the movie The End of Evangelion (1997).

The staff had already planned to introduce Kaworu Nagisa during the earliest stages of development. For that reason, they included him for two brief frames in the opening sequence of "A Cruel Angel's Thesis" as a pencil sketch against a red background, alongside images of Rei Ayanami and the caption "Angels". Gainax had nothing more than a character sketch of Kaworu at the time, drawn by the series' character designer, Yoshiyuki Sadamoto. The series' director Hideaki Anno intended to introduce an enemy in the form of a young human since the early stages of production, and Kaworu's role remained largely unchanged in the final version of the series. According to Sadamoto, however, Kaworu was not originally meant to be the last Angel. Instead, the staff simply envisioned that, after presenting Angels with widely different forms and abilities, one of them would eventually assume a human appearance. In the sixteenth episode, "Splitting of the Breast", the Angel Leliel comes into contact with Shinji Ikari. In the original screenplay, after experimenting with various human voices and languages, Leliel would ultimately have chosen Japanese to communicate with Shinji. Because Anno had already planned to introduce a human-looking enemy in the form of Kaworu Nagisa, however, he revised the script so that Kaworu, rather than Leliel, became the first Angel to speak a human language. Gainax also did not originally plan to introduce Lilith. The staff added the character only later, after further research into Christianity. According to Sadamoto, the decision stemmed from Anno's personal pride, as the director could not accept leaving Lilith out of the story.

In the Proposal, the twenty-second episode, "The Cat and the Transfer Student" (猫と転校生, Neko to tenkōsei), would have introduced the first humanoid Angel, an attractive young man, known as bishōnen in Japanese, constantly accompanied by a cat that Nerv would inadvertently allow into its headquarters. Shinji would then have faced the dilemma of confronting an anthropomorphic enemy, and the episode would ultimately have revealed Nerv's greatest secret. In this early draft, the young man was merely a puppet controlled by the cat, which was meant to be the true Angel. Sadamoto identified the Return of Ultraman episode "The Monster Tamer and the Boy" as a possible source of inspiration, since it features a lonely, ostracized boy named Ryō who shares a connection with a monster called Muruchi. Anno later considered Kaworu's introduction at Tokyo-3's school setting out of place for the twenty-fourth episode, as the story had by then moved beyond its original school-based premise. To avoid drawing complex scenes of the cat walking alongside him, the staff instead planned for Kaworu to carry it under his arm. Other proposals envisioned the Angel as the boy himself, while others portrayed it as a shapeshifter capable of assuming the form of either the boy or the cat, like a bakeneko, a shape-shifting cat yōkai from Japanese folklore. The staff ultimately abandoned the concept for practical reasons, since animating the cat would still have proved difficult. They also felt that the idea of a cat Angel manipulating a human puppet too closely resembled earlier works, like in the movie The Day the Earth Stood Still (1951). The ideas surrounding the bishōnen eventually evolved into Kaworu. The version ultimately broadcast on TV Tokyo diverged substantially from the project's initial outline. As production progressed, Anno and Gainax moved away from the Proposal original plans roughly from the thirteenth episode onward in favor of a more introspective, darker, and less linear story.

Hideaki Anno wrote the episode with screenwriter Akio Satsukawa. Anno also collaborated with Masayuki, the series' assistant director, on the storyboards. Masayuki additionally directed the episode, handled the layouts, and served as chief animation director. Masahiko Ohtsuka and Ken Ando assisted him with the episode's direction. The production involved, among others, Yō Yoshinari, Shinya Hasegawa, as well as the studios Neox, Marsa Inc., Anime Spot, and Tatsunoko Color Center. Yoshiyuki Sadamoto also contributed to the animation and supervised the layouts. Satsukawa chose both Kaworu's name and the episode's Japanese title. The production staff asked him to use something related to water or the sea. He opted for the surname Nagisa (渚; lit. 'shore') as a homage to Japanese director Nagisa Ōshima and to create a link with nami (波; lit. "wave") in the surname of Rei Ayanami. The name Kaworu was not written with the contemporary spelling カオル (Kaoru), but with the archaic character ヲ (wo). Nagisa (渚) was chosen to connect with the episode's Japanese title, "The Final Messenger" (最後のシ者, Saigo no shisha). Satsukawa then created a pun with the phoneme shisha, which can mean "messenger" (使者) or "dead" (死者) at the same time. Carl Gustav Horn, editor of the North American edition of the manga, recalled that, during the production of the last episodes, a Gainax staff member contacted him to verify the biblical source of the phrase "I am the Alpha and the Omega", which also appears in the episode's English title; Horn replied that the phrase appears three times in different forms in the Bible and provided the corresponding quotations.

=== Writing and early drafts ===
Anno worked on the episode's script with Akio Satsukawa. The director first gave each episode writer a memorandum outlining the general direction of the story and asked them to prepare an initial draft. The staff then reviewed the screenplay, offering comments and suggestions, after which the writer revised it accordingly. This process continued through multiple drafts. Anno then reviewed the script himself before further revisions and its submission to production. He discarded ideas he considered unsuitable for broadcast and unified the plot, characters, and other elements developed during the planning meetings into a consistent whole. By that point, Satsukawa had already contributed to nearly half of Evangelion's episodes, writing the scripts for the fifth, sixth, ninth, tenth, twelfth, thirteenth, nineteenth, and twenty-first episodes. He also introduced the concept of the hedgehog's dilemma, derived from Arthur Schopenhauer, which appears in the third and fourth episodes, which he wrote. The concept later became one of the series' central themes. In an interview, Satsukawa himself said that the episode that reflected his own personality most closely was the fifteenth, which he also wrote and contains neither Angels nor battles with Eva units, rather than the story of Kaworu. One of Satsukawa's drafts introduced a mini-Evangelion, the α Eva, built for the Human Instrumentality. Asuka and Rei would have experienced issues with their Evas. While discussing Misato's alcoholism and the meaning of love, Shinji would witness the arrival of Kaworu in a blue sailor uniform, being captivated by his beauty. Kensuke would visit the hospitalized Toji shortly before his discharge, describing Kaworu as a "prince". Unlike the final broadcast version, Satsukawa's draft also kept Tokyo-3 Middle School intact.

In Satsukawa's proposal, Shinji would have heard Vivaldi's "Winter" at school before walking with Kaworu in the rain and later swimming with him among the ruins of Odawara. Kaworu compared the city to Bruges in Erich Wolfgang Korngold's opera Die tote Stadt, whose protagonist builds a "Temple of Memories" for his dead wife. After Kaworu's true identity revelation, Asuka failed to pursue him with Eva-02, while Gendo fired Ritsuko for allowing his infiltration. Kaworu encountered the room where Rei was born before the α Eva attacked him like samurai Benkei on the Gojo Bridge and swallowed both him and Rei. After Eva-01 destroyed the α Eva, Kaworu compared Nerv itself to a "Temple of Memories" and instinctively tried to merge with Adam before Shinji killed him at the last moment. Ritsuko would then have been arrested, while Seele decided to dissolve Nerv. A second draft by Satsukawa opened with a dream depicted as a Western-style painting of twelve-year-old Asuka returning home after being chosen as an Eva pilot and finding her mother missing, before awakening in fetal position. Misato concealed Asuka's condition from Shinji; Ritsuko, meanwhile, was restrained during her confrontation with Gendo, comparing Rei to a toy, and laughing in Gendo's face. Shinji encountered Rei in a mirrored elevator and Kaworu playing the piano in the ruins of Tokyo-3. Kaworu later held Shinji's hand in Nerv's bath, causing him to faint; after Shinji awoke, Kaworu kissed him, which Shinji accepted naturally. Hyuga subsequently revealed the existence of the Dead Sea Scrolls to Misato, while Kaworu told Rei that she was like him after the two touched hands. Kaworu then took control of Eva-02. Believing Shinji incapable of killing him, Rei volunteered to stop Kaworu herself, although Shinji nevertheless pursued him in Eva-01. Seele ultimately identified humanity as the sole surviving Angel. In the subsequent final draft, Kaworu was introduced as a pilot sent from Germany and retrieved by VTOL aircraft after meeting Shinji. It retained the elevator scene between Shinji and Rei and the revelation that humanity was the final Angel. Gendo also addressed a naked Rei as "Yui", while Misato embraced Shinji in the final scene.

=== Development ===
In an interview, Anno stated that Satsukawa's original drafts had an atmosphere closer to homosexual works and contained scenes with more explicit homoerotic content. Anno himself described Satsukawa as being more capable than he was when it came to the subject of homoeroticism. In one scene, for example, Shinji and Kaworu were supposed to swim naked together in a river at night. In another scene from the drafts, rumors that he and Shinji were a couple would have begun circulating among the girls at school. Shinji would have tried to declare his love to Kaworu, but Kaworu would have rejected him. Shaken by the rejection, Shinji would have lost his appetite, prompting Asuka to worry about him. The series' producer rejected the river scene proposal, finding it excessive; the director, while modifying the sequence, stated that he retained some of the atmosphere of Satsukawa's original draft, moving the scene to the Nerv hot springs. According to Yoshiyuki Sadamoto, Anno developed Satsukawa's image of the two boys in the river in his own way, lending the scene in Nerv's public baths what he described as "a decadent" atmosphere. According to Yutaka Satō, public relations representative for Gainax, Satsukawa's original scene had a much more obvious erotic connotation than the final version in the Nerv public baths, which is a relatively common social situation for Japanese men. Satō also compared Satsukawa's scene to films starring River Phoenix. In another sequence from the original drafts, Kaworu played piano. Shinji would meet Kaworu at night in a deserted music room after an evacuation, and the two would then promise to play four-handed music together, with Kaworu playing a piano and Shinji playing a cello. The staff eliminated this suggestion, but Satsukawa still included a scene in which Shinji plays the cello in the fifteenth episode. The staff also added the final scene of Eva-01 being washed clean of Kaworu's blood, along with the subsequent scene between Misato and Shinji, during production.

Hideaki Anno admitted that he did not understand Kaworu Nagisa's character. He nevertheless sought to portray him as the "unconscious Shinji" and an idealized version of Shinji, someone everyone would fall in love with. He also projected onto him his own shadow, the dark side of an individual's personality as conceived by Carl Gustav Jung. When asked about the dialogue in the hot springs, Anno replied that he conceived the scene naturally; he also maintained that he hadn't read homoerotic material such as that in yaoi boy's love magazines before writing the episode, nor had he experienced anything similar to Kaworu's declaration to Shinji. The official film books on the series have emphasized that even in previous works by studio Gainax there are several scenes in which characters are soaking in water while bathing. This element also recurs frequently in Evangelion; the character of Misato, for example, loves bathing and has Pen-Pen, a hot spring penguin, as a pet. Anime critic Ryōta Fujitsu similarly observed that, in Hideaki Anno's works, the bath often serves as a place where characters reveal their true feelings. In Gunbuster, for example, Noriko and Kazumi deepen their bond with Jung Freud while talking in a large bath, whereas in Nadia: The Secret of Blue Water Electra reveals her tragic past while bathing aboard the Nautilus. Likewise, in Evangelion, Misato hints at her own past during the hot spring scene in "Magmadiver". The director linked the image of bathing in the tub to the idea of a return to the mother's womb. Anno also linked the bathing scene between Shinji and Kaworu to the spontaneous displays of homosocial bonds between men and young boys in Japanese society, where it is common after a day at the beach or after middle school to gather together in public baths, an informal meeting place for Japanese men, but without physical contact. Anno didn't hold Satsukawa back, but at one point he found his colleague's homoerotic script beyond his tolerance level. Masayuki also threatened to walk away from the production over the homoerotic elements in Satsukawa's script.

Additional suggestions came from Mitsuo Iso, who had previously contributed ideas for the fifth episode and written the thirteenth. Iso's proposal introduced Eva-05, described as an Evangelion of roughly human size, a miniature counterpart to Eva-01 with a roar modeled on the dinosaurs from Jurassic Park. Like Satsukawa's version, Iso's draft also portrayed Kaworu as a cat Angel; in Iso's idea, Kaworu was able to attack through psychokinesis and a dynamo, the astrophysical mechanism by which a celestial body generates an electromagnetic field. The cat would have attacked Toji and Kensuke before being pursued by a female Terminator and a male Terminator who fought using ninja-like techniques. Kaworu would then have spoken with Rei while standing atop a utility pole in a scene inspired by Kenji Miyazawa's Kaze no Matasaburo. The episode's overall surreal atmosphere would also have recalled Nazo no Tenkōsei (なぞの転校生; lit. 'Mysterious Transfer Student') by Taku Mayumura. Iso further proposed introducing rainbows as a religious symbol in the episode, reflecting their longstanding association with the covenant between God and humanity; the rainbow religious symbolism was ultimately incorporated into the fifth episode of the series, "Rei I". A fan theory also emerged claiming that Gainax had modeled Kaworu on Kunihiko Ikuhara, the director of Sailor Moon and a friend of Anno. Anno had worked as an animator on Sailor Moon and remained in close contact with Ikuhara while developing Evangelion. In an interview, however, Ikuhara said that he did not identify with Kaworu, arguing that the character's frank personality more closely resembled Anno himself. The only similarity he recognized was the scene in Nerv's public baths. On one occasion, he and Anno visited a hot spring with the Sailor Moon staff, and the two spent the entire night drinking and talking long after everyone else had gone to bed. When Ikuhara watched the episode, he found the scene virtually identical to that experience.

=== Animation, design and style ===
Like the rest of the series' second half, "The Beginning and the End, or 'Knockin' on Heaven's Door'" was produced under severe time constraints and suffered from significant production difficulties caused by an increasingly demanding schedule. When the series began airing, only the first twelve episodes had been completed after nearly two years of production, forcing Gainax to produce the remaining fourteen in roughly one-third of the time. Masayuki completed his work in only three weeks, whereas the early episode had required months merely to complete the scripts and animation. The staff devoted two full weeks to the animation before proceeding immediately to the editing stage. Since the episodes were delivered at the last minute, the series' broadcaster TV Tokyo could not check them before airing. Hideaki Anno himself described the production of the series, particularly its final episodes, as a live performance marked by improvisation and the absence of a clearly defined strategy; staff simply gave priority to cost performance. When the staff worked on the episode "Don't Be", they had no idea what would happen two episodes later in "The Beginning and the End, or 'Knockin' on Heaven's Door'". Even the concept of the AT Field, first introduced in the early episodes, initially carried no philosophical implications. Although Kaworu explains in this episode that the AT Fields are the "walls of the heart", Anno originally conceived them simply as a plausible explanation for why only the Evangelions could defeat the Angels using their own AT Fields. Sadamoto also recalled that Evangelion scripts were written with enough material for roughly two episodes before Anno condensed them, and believed that several scenes involving Kaworu were consequently discarded. The staff abandoned the originally planned ending and compressed ideas originally intended for five or six episodes into a single episode.

The production initially assigned the twenty-fourth episode to Kazuya Tsurumaki, the series' assistant director, while Masayuki was slated to direct the following episode. As the disastrous production schedule made it clear that Gainax could no longer complete the originally planned ending, the studio changed course and reassigned Masayuki to the preceding episode. Sadamoto, by contrast, had been only minimally involved in the series' production, as he was busy working on the manga adaptation of the series. At the time, Sadamoto was working on both the cover illustration for the manga's second volume and the chapters for its serialization, describing the period as a "hellish schedule". After managing to postpone the deadline for the manga pages, he found himself with a few free days and decided to join the episode's production. According to Sadamoto, the entire staff was in a general state of panic over the looming deadline by the time he joined the episode's production. Masayuki himself credited Sadamoto's arrival with saving the production. Sadamoto designed Kaworu as an idealized Shinji, taller and with a more slender neck, combining Shinji's facial features with those of Rei and Asuka. Another source of inspiration was the boys of Johnny's Jr., known for their youthful, androgynous facial features. Sadamoto himself had the opportunity to meet several members of Johnny's Jr. backstage. Kaworu was originally meant to acquire a design featuring a core and facial markings after a transformation. The episode's color designer, Harumi Takaboshi, also gave him red eyes to create a more distinctive impression.

Approximately one-third of the episode's visuals reuse footage from earlier episodes. For example, scholar Ida Kirkegaard noted that the entire sequence in which Misato Katsuragi and the Nerv operators react in shock to Kaworu's descent into Nerv headquarters consists entirely of animation banks—that is, footage reused from earlier episodes with different dialogue and narrative context. Her colleague José Andrés Santiago Iglesias similarly noted that the scene showing Asuka lying in a bathtub during her psychological breakdown contains almost no animation; he also observed that the kitchen scene between Asuka and Shinji ends with a "barely animated" close-up of Asuka's face. Gainax concluded the final confrontation with a still image lasting approximately one minute, showing Kaworu Nagisa cradled in the hand of Eva-01. Slant Magazine writer Michael Peterson cited the scene as an example of Hideaki Anno's visual minimalism. The staff had previously employed similar extended still frames during moments of tension between the characters in the fourth and twenty-second episodes. Ryōta Fujitsu argued that such a prolonged still image is a risky device to use in a television series because it exposes the story's artificiality to the viewer; nevertheless, he maintained that it succeeds in sustaining the scene's tension. José Iglesias argued the still image has a narrative and aesthetic function and "it mostly helps to build momentum and suspense in an attempt to convey Shinji's psyche"; according to Iglesias, "it could be argued that in this sequence, the Eva-01 is no longer a machine, but a visual representation of Shinji himself".

After the conclusion of the first broadcast Gainax remade the episodes affected by time constraints from scratch, including "The Beginning and the End, or 'Knockin' on Heaven's Door'". Several sequences were redrawn, and completely unedited sequences were added to better connect with the ending and to clarify some unexplained plot points. The extended version of the episodes, called the video format version or home video version, differs from the on-air version in several respects; Gainax first released the new footage in the movie Neon Genesis Evangelion: Death & Rebirth (1997) and later in the 1998 Evangelion Laserdisc edition. Anno initially considered expanding Shinji and Kaworu Nagisa's story in the home video version. In the broadcast version, Kaworu speaks almost exclusively with Shinji Ikari and has only a brief exchange with Rei Ayanami, as Anno felt there was no need for him to interact with the other characters. He later decided, however, to add a scene between Kaworu and Misato Katsuragi. In an interview conducted before the release of the home video extended version, Anno said that he could not imagine what such a scene would even look like. For the extended version, known in the West as the director's cut, Gainax added the opening scene in which Asuka learns of Ryoji Kaji's death, as well as the conversation between Kaworu and Seele on the shores of Lake Ashi. Furthermore, the director's cut altered the scene depicting Asuka in the bathtub during her psychological breakdown; the original television broadcast concealed her body in shadow, whereas the revised version shows it clearly. The studio also extended the conversation between Rei and Kaworu, inserted a shot showing the embryo of Adam in Gendo Ikari's palm and refined the animation of scenes already present in the original broadcast version.

=== Voice acting and English dub ===
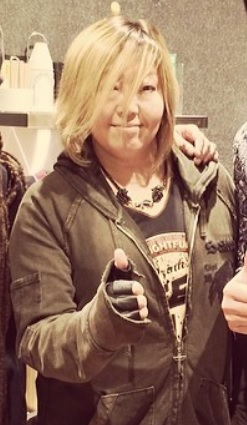
Megumi Ogata, Shinji's voice actress, defended Netflix's revised translation against accusations of queer erasure.

Akira Ishida voiced Kaworu in Japanese. Before Evangelion, Ishida voiced several notable characters, including Fish Eye, a sexually ambiguous character from Sailor Moon. Ishida obtained the role without a dedicated audition, and the production gave him little explanation of Kaworu's character. Anno himself said that he gave Akira Ishida very little direction, asking only for a gentler tone. Ishida said that he struggled to understand Evangelion, but he still found himself empathizing with Shinji in much the same way he had while reading No Longer Human by Osamu Dazai. Although he had to portray a character who speaks with "self-assured words", a "navigator for delving into the labyrinth of Evangelion", Ishida said that he nevertheless experienced a sense of anguish voicing him, wondering about the meaning of Kaworu's character. After only a few takes, Ishida fully captured the character, impressing Anno despite having neither seen the series nor been able to watch the animation during the recording sessions. In another interview, Anno admitted that he stopped understanding Kaworu Nagisa while making the episode, describing him as "a strange guy". Ishida's performance, however, led him to reassess the character, ultimately convincing him that the voice actor's interpretation surpassed the image he had originally envisioned. Sadamoto also envisioned him with a "younger" voice than in the final version while designing him.

Akira Ishida once again portrayed the calm and intelligent young man with Kaworu, a type of character he had frequently played before Evangelion. The home video version also brought the cast back to rerecord their scenes. In the conversation between Kaworu and Rei, for example, the revised version adopts a generally slower pace, while Ishida's performance gives Kaworu a slightly more theatrical delivery than the restrained television broadcast. Kotono Mitsuishi, Misato's voice actress, gave her character a more mature voice in the extended version. According to the official liner notes of the series, this change could be due to Mitsuishi's career; after Evangelion, she went from comic roles like Sailor Moon's Usagi Tsukino to more serious and mature characters, such as in Sentimental Graffiti or Crayon Shin-chan. During the recording sessions, the staff also asked Megumi Hayashibara, Rei's voice actress, to provide Pen-Pen's voice in the scene where Misato bids him farewell; the unexpected request caught Hayashibara off guard and made the recording unusually difficult.

Because some time had passed between the television broadcast and the extended version, Akira Ishida found it difficult to reproduce the same vocal tone. The staff themselves pointed out the difference, leaving him anxious about how fans might react. Uncertain about Kaworu's role in the story, he approached the first recording with considerable nervousness, choosing to perform the character naturally while conveying an air of mystery. By the time he rerecorded the role for the extended version, however, he felt much more at ease, later remarking that his performance in the original television broadcast had largely come about by chance. Ishida also recalled that he didn't consciously approach the public bath scene between Kaworu and Shinji as a yaoi sequence. Ishida nevertheless reprised the role shortly after the television broadcast for an audio drama named After the End and included on the album Neon Genesis Evangelion Addition (1996). On that occasion, he deliberately adopted what he described as a more yaoi-like vocal delivery, but the performance met with a negative response from fans, leading him to conclude that he had taken the wrong approach.

In Netflix's English 2019 dub, one of Kaworu's lines to Shinji changed from ADV Films' "I love you" to "I like you". Kaworu also describes Shinji as "worthy of love" in ADV Films' English dub, while Netflix's version translates the line as "worthy of grace". The decision proved controversial among some fans, who argued that it altered the nature of the characters' relationship for queer erasure. Anime scholar Jonathan Clements noted that ADV’s subtitles also used the term "like", making the censorship hypothesis unlikely. He further argued that "both terms carry a certain ambiguity". Dan Kanemitsu, Studio Khara's in-house translator and the person responsible for the revised Evangelion subtitles and other official Gainax and Khara translations, including the Rebuild of Evangelion films, explained that he consults the original creator whenever a passage is unclear or ambiguous. He defended the translation by emphasizing the importance of preserving ambiguity, citing Hideaki Anno's comments on Neon Genesis Evangelion's openness to interpretation, as well as his own commitment to accuracy and to conveying the original text's nuances across cultural boundaries. Megumi Ogata, Shinji's Japanese voice actress, also endorsed Kanemitsu's translation, stating that she had always interpreted Kaworu's words as expressing "like" rather than "love" and welcomed the Netflix version for adhering more closely to the original Japanese dialogue.

=== Music ===
The fourth movement of Symphony No. 9 by Ludwig van Beethoven

"The Beginning and the End, or 'Knockin' on Heaven's Door'" contains no original score by Shirō Sagisu, who composed the music for the rest of the series. The episode's only musical accompaniment is Symphony No. 9 by German composer Ludwig van Beethoven, specifically the "Ode to Joy" from its fourth movement, based on the poem of the same name by Friedrich Schiller. Akio Satsukawa was already known for incorporating classical music into his works, including pieces from Abbé Prévost's Manon Lescaut and Giacomo Puccini's Madama Butterfly. For the episode, Anno specifically selected the recording performed by the BRTN Philharmonic Orchestra under the direction of Alexander Rahbari. Kaworu hums the melody during his first appearance, and it can later be heard briefly playing from Shinji's Sony Digital Audio Tape player before the public bath scene. Kaworu himself describes music as the pinnacle of the culture created by humankind while singing the "Ode to Joy". The Ninth Symphony also accompanies the episode's final battle between Shinji's Eva-01 and Kaworu's Eva-02, as well as the final still image of Kaworu held in Eva-01's hand before his death. The series had previously used classical music in the twenty-second episode, "Don't Be", during the Angel Arael's psychological assault on Asuka. Writer Dennis Redmond compared Anno's use of classical music in violent scenes to Stanley Kubrick's A Clockwork Orange (1971). According to scholar Rose Bridges, even considering the Symphony's association with scenes of ultraviolence in A Clockwork Orange, Evangelion still manages to find "a different way to make it jarring".

Critics and the series' official materials state that the "Ode to Joy" was chosen both to reinforce the episode's central themes and because of the line, "We enter intoxicated and quivering, O Heavenly One, into Thy temple" (Wir betreten feuertrunken, Himmlische, dein Heiligtum in German). According to the official Symphony of Evangelion album booklet, the piece reflects Shinji's feelings toward Kaworu after the latter betrays him and Shinji ultimately kills him with Eva-01. Critic Ryōta Fujitsu argued that Kaworu's decision to hum and praise a song celebrating friendship is ironic and may symbolize the point at which the Angels, after their earlier blind, instinctive attacks, come to understand human beings. Scholar Haiku Hoffer has noted how "Ode to Joy", unlike other pieces such as Johann Sebastian Bach's Suite for Cello Solo No.1 in G Major used in the fifteenth episode, is well known in Japan, as it is played during end-of-year concerts called Daiku (第九; lit. 'Number Nine'); the fact that Kaworu hums the piece in front of Shinji, seen in Japan as a song to be sung as a group symbol of cooperation and a sense of community, would immediately suggest to the Japanese viewer how the two characters are destined to become friends over the course of the series. Also audible in the piece is the phrase "der Cherub steht vor Gott", "the cherub stands before God", which Hoffer associates with the fact that Kaworu stands before the Angel Lilith, a figure resembling a deity. Rose Bridges has linked the lyrics of Beethoven's Ninth Symphony, which center on the universal brotherhood of humankind, to Seele's Human Instrumentality Project, a plan to unite all of humanity into a single collective consciousness by eliminating conflict between individuals.

According to anime scholar Susan J. Napier, the use of Beethoven's "Ode to Joy" reflects Hideaki Anno's intellectual directorial approach, which abandons the spectacular imagery and relentless action typical of apocalyptic science fiction in favor of exploring what she describes as an "apocalyptic psyche"; Anno's "disorienting music" forms part of a combination of stark yet somber visuals, photomontages, and unsettling voice-overs, creating an audiovisual experience that privileges psychological exploration over spectacle. Dennis Redmond and Rose Bridges speculated that Anno chose the "Ode to Joy" because it has served as the official anthem of the European Union since 1985. Redmond further argued that Anno juxtaposes each of the central symbols in Friedrich Schiller's text with an opposing element from the episode: "divine joy with human sorrow, the daughters of Heaven with the angels of Seele, the highest reaches of Heaven with the deepest recesses of the Geofront, and the joyous sparks of the gods (Götterfunken in German) with the earth-shattering clash of the Evas". Scholar Gavin McDowell has connected the use of Beethoven's "Ode to Joy" to other German references throughout the series, arguing that Evangelion displays a broader fascination with Germany. These include the German names of organizations such as Nerv and Gehirn, as well as the inclusion of the Spear of Longinus, one of the religious relics sought by Nazi Germany during the Second World War. Redmond similarly likened Beethoven's Ninth Symphony to other German motifs throughout the series, including Asuka's German origins and Nerv's Third Branch in Germany.

== Cultural references ==
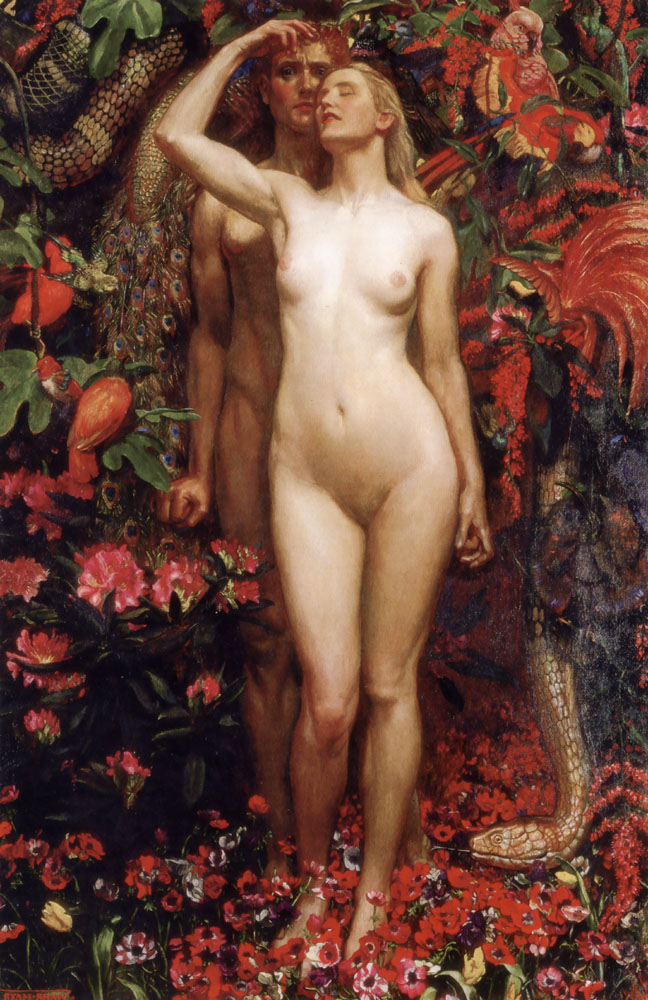
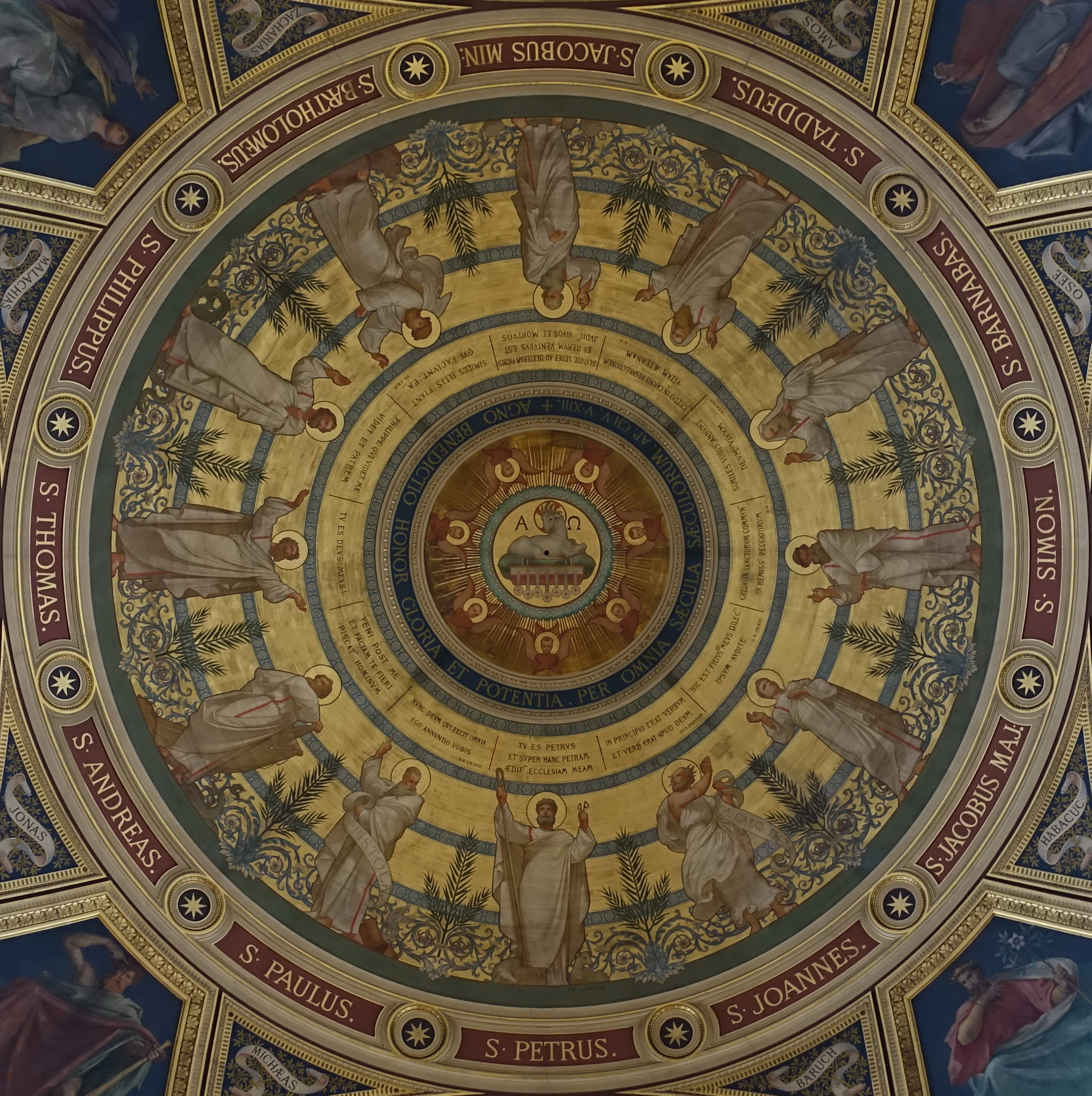
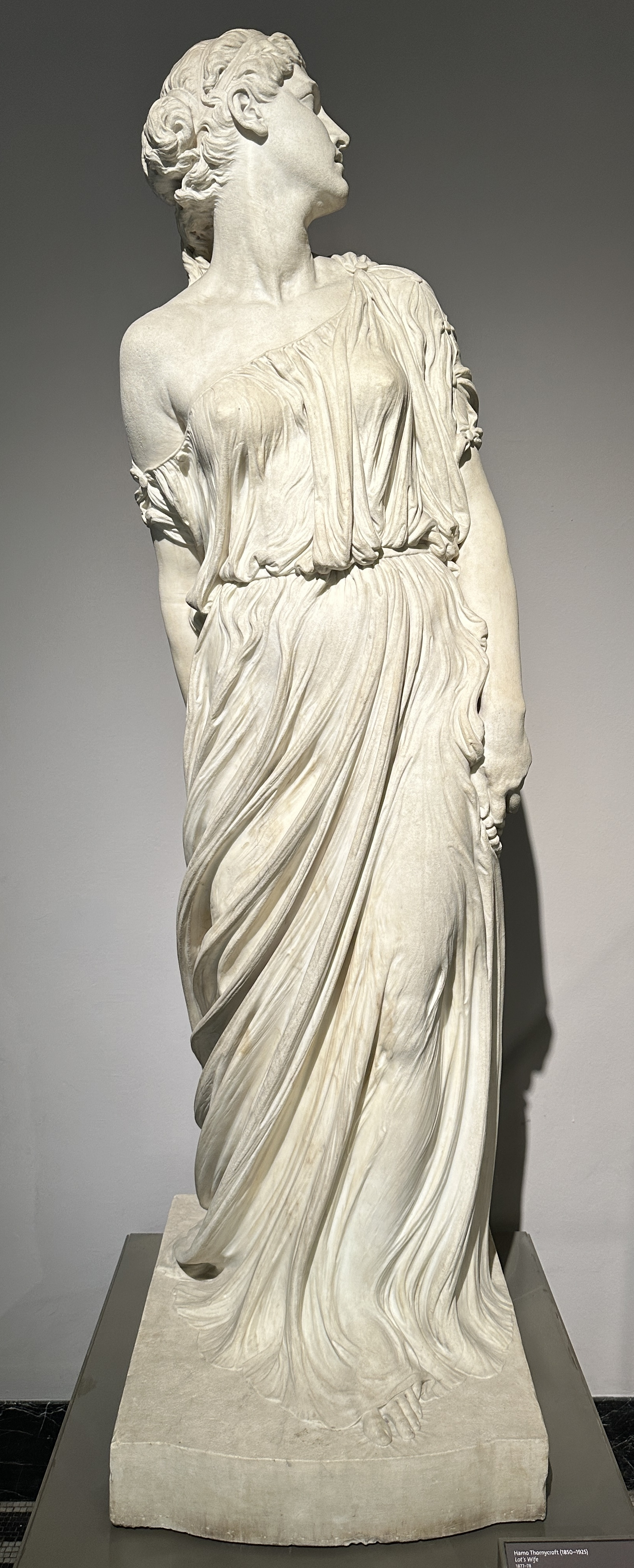
The episode draws on religious imagery from the stories of Adam, Eve, and Lilith, the Lamb of God described in the Book of Revelation, and the biblical story of Lot's wife turning into a pillar of salt.

The first part of the episode's title, "The Beginning of the End", references the Book of Revelation: ""I am Alpha and Omega, the beginning and the end, the first and the last". "The beginning" and "the end" symbolize the creation and destruction of the world in this context. The second part, "Knockin' on Heaven's Door", has instead been interpreted as a reference to the song of the same name by Bob Dylan. During the episode, Kaworu Nagisa refers to human beings as the Lilim, a race of demons from Jewish tradition said to be the children of Lilith. He also discovers that the giant concealed beneath Nerv headquarters is not Adam but the second Angel, Lilith, whose name derives from a demon identified in rabbinic literature as Adam's first wife before Eve. As later revealed in The End of Evangelion, Adam and Lilith are the two Seeds of Life from whom the Angels and humanity respectively descend, with humans themselves described as the eighteenth and final Angel. The videogame Neon Genesis Evangelion 2 further expands this premise, explaining that the First Ancestral Race originally sent both beings to Earth. Lilith, however, reached the planet by accident during the Giant Impact with her Black Moon, triggering a conflict in which the Angels, Earth's original inhabitants, struggle against humanity for dominion over the planet.

Throughout the episode, Lilith appears wearing her distinctive mask, which bears seven asymmetrically arranged eyes on an inverted triangle, the emblem of Seele. The symbol references both the seven-eyed, seven-horned Lamb of God described in the Book of Revelation representing the Seven Spirits of God and the Jewish tradition according to which Yahweh watches over Creation through seven eyes. The number seven takes on considerable importance in Kabbalistic mysticism of Judeo-Christian origin, as a symbol of completeness. Scholars Víctor Sellés de Lucas and Manuel Hernández-Pérez noted that Seele's emblem triangle may represent an inverted version of the Eye of Providence. According to the Evangelion Encyclopedia, published alongside the Italian Platinum Edition of the series, the seven eyes could also refer to the "seven wise custodians of the Torah". Writer Virginie Nebbia compared Lilith's face to the mask worn by Marilupa in Nausicaä of the Valley of the Wind by Hayao Miyazaki, while Kemur, an antagonist from Ultra Q, likewise features a similarly asymmetrical face. The episode also depicts Lilith crucified and surrounded by pillars of salt resembling those rising from Antarctica after the Second Impact in the series' twelfth episode. These pillars allude to the biblical story of Sodom and Gomorrah, traditionally associated with the Dead Sea, and more specifically to the transformation of Lot's wife into a pillar of salt. Hideaki Anno had already used the same motif in Nadia: The Secret of Blue Water, where the antagonist Gargoyle turns into a pillar of salt in the finale. Gainax later revisited the same biblical imagery in Evangelion through the Secret Dead Sea Scrolls, inspired by the historical Dead Sea Scrolls discovered at Qumran.

Japanese scholar and writer Yūya Satō compared Kaworu's role to that of the male characters of yaoi comics, as well as that of the characters of the shōjo genre, that is, Japanese comics aimed primarily at a female audience, typically characterized by introspection and an emphasis on the relationships between characters; for Sato, the appearance of Kaworu is more important on a thematic than narrative level, and would have the purpose of deepening the psychological aspects of Shinji. She compared his role to shōjo manga, where the process and the relational dynamics of the protagonists have more weight than the conclusion or the fights. Director Anno himself stated that he read romance novels written by female authors while writing the characters of Evangelion and that shōjo manga had influenced him since his youth. He often preferred them to shōnen manga, which target a predominantly male audience. Among the authors he cited as formative influences were Fusako Kuramochi, Shinji Wada, Mariko Iwadate, and Yumiko Ōshima. Furthermore, engineer Yumiko Yano also compared Asuka's dull gaze in the episode, locked up in a hospital room after a psychic and emotional breakdown, to the dolls of artist Katan Amano. Virginie Nebbia compared Kaworu's sociable personality to that of Perolynga and Metron, two monsters from Ultraseven. She linked the comparison to Akio Jissōji, a director who greatly influenced Anno and with whom Satsukawa collaborated on A Watcher in the Attic (1994). Perolynga in particular appears as a friendly monster whom the protagonists nevertheless kill at the end of the episode, despite its closing scenes suggesting that human beings are bad. Nebbia also noted that Jan, one of the protagonists of Childhood's End by Arthur C. Clarke, plays the piano on an Earth devoid of humanity much like Kaworu. She further compared Kaworu's angel-shaped statue to the cover illustration of Shitsurakuen (失楽園; lit. 'Paradise Lost') by Daijirō Morohoshi, which depicts the statue of an accusing angel precariously balanced above a vast expanse of water.

Critics have compared Kaworu to Jesus Christ because of his decision to sacrifice himself for the survival of humanity. Scholar Gavin McDowell further argued that Kaworu's revelation that he carries Adam's soul echoes Paul the Apostle's theology, which presents Christ as the new Adam. Psychologist Yasufumi Nakoshi instead compared Kaworu, an Angel incarnated in human form, to a recurring motif in Hindu mythology, in which deities assume human bodies, such as Krishna, an incarnation of Vishnu. Writer Tetra Tanizaki likewise likened Kaworu's role to that of the Christian guardian angel. Wired has suggested that the character may have drawn inspiration from Ryō Asuka, also known as Satan, the antagonist of Devilman by Gō Nagai. Animator Yūichirō Oguro instead compared Kaworu's role to that of Lalah Sune from Mobile Suit Gundam, a young woman who understands protagonist Amuro Ray's thoughts and ultimately dies at his hands in the closing episodes, while French website Du9 likened the image of Kaworu killed by Eva-01 to Francisco Goya's Saturn Devouring His Son. Kaworu's Angel name, Tabris, references the angel of free will from the Nuctemeron attributed to Apollonius of Tyana, reflecting his decision to allow Shinji to kill him. Evangelion Chronicle, an official encyclopedia about the series, noted that Apollonius's Nuctemeron also mentions a demon named Cahor (カホル, Kahoru), the angel of deception, a reference to Kaworu's deceptive human appearance. Writer Alexandre Marine interpreted Kaworu's name as a possible reference to Kaoru Orihara, also known as Kaoru-no-kimi ("Prince Kaoru"), the androgynous girl from Dear Brother by Osamu Dezaki. Marine also connected the archaic spelling Kaworu, rather than the modern Kaoru, with Kaoru (薫), the character from Murasaki Shikibu's The Tale of Genji. Critic Ryōta Fujitsu noted that Kaworu's name is gender-neutral, linking the choice to the androgynous portrayal of Satan in Devilman. Anno reiterated in an interview that he instead associated the name with Kaworu's role as an ideal boy and an idealized version of Shinji, arguing that "there's no feminine sense whatsoever".

== Themes ==
"The Beginning and the End, or 'Knockin' on Heaven's Door'" primarily explores the psychology of its characters, reveals several mysteries surrounding the true nature of the Angels, and introduces the character of Kaworu Nagisa. The episode opens by revealing Asuka's past, including her mother's suicide following a descent into madness. After losing her ability to synchronize with Eva-02, Asuka falls into a catatonic state and enters the hospital. Writers Heather Browning and Walter Veit observed that "without the validation she receives from piloting the Eva, she no longer feels like her life is worthwhile". Anime critic Akio Nagatomi argued that Asuka ultimately becomes a reflection of her mother, reinforcing one of the series' central themes: the burden parents pass on to their children and the way the latter repeat their parents' mistakes. In another scene, Gendo describes the Spear of Longinus as an obstacle to his desires. Misato Katsuragi also responds coldly to Shinji in the last scene, comforting him without physical contact, foreshadowing a scene in The End of Evangelion in which Shinji admits that he fears her. Meanwhile, Makoto Hyuga reveals his feelings for Misato.

Writer Álvaro Arbonés observed that the episode does not center on the mystery of Kaworu's identity as an Angel, since his angelic nature becomes apparent from his opening scenes. The episode hints at Kaworu's true identity from his very first appearance, in which he sings Beethoven while sitting atop an angel-like statue. Critic and writer Ryōta Fujitsu compared Kaworu's angelic statue to a gargoyle or a fallen angel. During one conversation, Kaworu tells Rei that they are alike. According to scholar Fabio Bartoli, as a clone descended from Adam, Kaworu lacks a personal past just like Rei. Rei herself recognizes the similarity and displays superhuman abilities throughout the episode by generating an AT Field and witnessing Kaworu's death from above within Nerv headquarters. The theatrical version further reveals that, like Rei, Kaworu's clones serve as the basis for the Dummy System, an artificial piloting system that replicates a human pilot's thought patterns for the Mass Production Model Evas. Shinji, meanwhile, associates Rei with his mother, Yui Ikari.

The previous two episodes introduced the Angels Arael and Armisael, both of whom attempted to establish contact with Asuka and Rei through violent psychophysical attacks while seeking to understand the human mind. As Kaworu, Tabris refines the same strategy. An official series booklet explains that Seele likely recovered Kaworu in an embryonic state after the Second Impact. According to a guide on the original series included with the Neon Genesis Evangelion RPG card game, the chrysalis-like Angel discovered beneath Mount Asama in the tenth episode indicates that the Angels remained dormant across the Earth as embryos, while animator Yūichirō Oguro interpreted its rapid adaptation to the volcanic environment as suggesting that Angels could alter their forms and abilities according to their surroundings or purpose. Oguro further interpreted Kaworu's remark to Rei as suggesting that the preceding Angels had explored various forms before Kaworu, the final Angel, attained the same form as humans. The episode also reveals that Kaworu's birthday coincides with the Second Impact, an event triggered by the implantation of human genes into the first Angel, Adam. Scholar Fabio Bartoli consequently speculated that the genetic donor may have been the fourteen-year-old Misato, who was present in Antarctica during the catastrophe.

The episode reveals that the second Angel, Lilith, gave rise to humanity, whereas Adam became the progenitor of the Angels that attacked Nerv throughout the series and the Evas. Kaworu also explains that he himself comes from Adam and that the return of either life form to its respective source can obliterate the other. Academic Mariana Ortega consequently described Rei and Kaworu as two "primordial parents" comparable to those of Jewish mythology. Kaworu further explains that every living being possesses an AT Field, describing it as the "walls of the heart" that separate one person from another, a major Evangelion theme. Rather than breaking through Shinji's psychological defenses with violence like the previous Angels, Kaworu lowers them through kindness and gentle words; this behavior can therefore be interpreted as an attempt to lower Shinji's AT Field. Scholar Antony Chun-man Tam described the AT Field as "the manifestation of the physical and mental divisions between beings", a concept that suggests genuine mutual understanding ultimately remains impossible. The conversation between Shinji and Kaworu, centered on pain and loneliness, also echoes Rei's dialogue with Armisael in the preceding episode. In an interview, Hideaki Anno likewise stated that he had come to regard happiness as nothing more than an illusion.

=== Shinji's psychology and existentialism ===
Throughout the episode, Shinji struggles with loneliness after his friends leave Tokyo-3. One scene shows him overlooking the ruined city in a shot recalling the panoramic view from the series' fourth episode, immediately before he meets Kaworu. The episode also alludes to Shinji's life before arriving in Tokyo-3, when he lived with a guardian living empty days with no real human interaction. Scholar Rob Vuckovich observed that Shinji displays a misanthropic attitude while discussing his past. Vuckovich further argued that Evangelion explores the existential themes of suffering and individual isolation through Shinji's freedom to choose. In his view, Shinji's decision to kill Tabris, the Angel of free will, not only has apocalyptic significance for humanity's fate, but also "illustrates the conflict that wages inside Shinji's conscience as he exercises his free will". In Shinji's case, "human existence rests literally and figuratively in his hands". Kaworu tells Shinji that he avoids human contact because doing so protects him from emotional pain; without human contact, however, people remain alone and cannot truly live. Vuckovich connected this dialogue to Arthur Schopenhauer's hedgehog's dilemma, previously introduced in the series, according to which every human relationship inevitably entails suffering.

In an attempt to overcome his loneliness, Shinji comes to regard Kaworu as a friend, only to face the necessity of killing him. Vuckovich compared Shinji's dilemma to Abraham's willingness to sacrifice Isaac in obedience to God, as discussed by Søren Kierkegaard in Fear and Trembling (1843). According to Vuckovich, "the isolated Shinji exemplifies the Kierkegaardian concept of the individual who desperately has to perform a task that no other can perform". He further argued that the climactic battle between Tabris and Shinji unfolds primarily within the protagonist's inner self, portraying him as "the hero who longs not to be the hero" and wishes someone else could take his place. Vuckovich also noted that Tabris, the Angel of free will, never directly handles anything during the battle because free will itself has limitations. Eva-01 is wounded in the chest during the clash, a detail that Vuckovich interpreted as a metaphor for Shinji's broken heart. As Vuckovich concluded, "For Shinji, there is no avoiding whatever choice he opts for, because he is seized by his own free will to put an end to deliberation. Shinji must live with the consequences of his own design". Writer Patrick Drazen instead compared Shinji's inner conflict to that of Prince Hamlet, the protagonist of Hamlet by William Shakespeare.

=== Shinji and Kaworu's relationship ===
Critics have analyzed the symbolism of hands throughout the episode, particularly the scene in which Kaworu inadvertently touches Shinji's hand and Shinji does not pull away. According to Masayuki, the staff originally intended Kaworu merely to brush against Shinji's hand, but production time constraints left the animators' more intimate interpretation uncorrected.

Kaworu plays a brief yet pivotal role in Shinji's character arc. Scholar Satoshi Tsukamoto and Protoculture Addicts magazine argued that Shinji sees Kaworu as someone who understands and accepts him. Kaworu tells Shinji that his heart is as fragile as glass and that he loves him for that very imperfection. After discovering that Kaworu is in fact an Angel, Shinji feels betrayed by the only person to whom he has opened himself so completely. According to writer Zachary Verber, Shinji consequently faces the dilemma of killing the first person to genuinely accept and love him in the name of duty. Psychologist Yasufumi Nakoshi has further argued that Kaworu can express his feelings for Shinji only by sacrificing himself. Fabio Bartoli stated that Shinji, by killing Kaworu, destroys the purest part of himself. Kaworu's death ultimately precipitates Shinji's complete psychological collapse in the series finale. Before dying, Kaworu says that meeting Shinji made him happy; Evangelion Chronicle stated that his affection for Shinji is genuine and independent of his identity as an Angel. Anime Feminist writers likewise interpreted Kaworu's interactions with Shinji as a sincere expression of love.

The official series filmbooks noted that Kaworu keeps his hands in his pockets for most of the episode, a gesture commonly associated with concealing something. His interactions with Shinji, however, often reveal his hands openly, reflecting a form of symbolism that runs throughout both the episode and the series. Critic Vrai Kaiser noted that "Kaworu and Shinji's very intimate bath conversation focuses on shoulder-up shots and the meeting of their hands". In the previous episode, "Rei III", Misato Katsuragi tried to reach Shinji by touching his hand, but Shinji rejected the gesture because Misato merely sought temporary comfort for herself through him. Kaworu, by contrast, naturally takes Shinji's hand despite Shinji's usual reluctance toward physical contact, expressing a sincere desire to understand him rather than to use him. Their relationship is depicted in an ambiguously worded manner; Kaworu uses the word suki (好き) to express his feelings for Shinji in the bath scene, which can indicate various forms of intimacy from friendship to love, and has been variously translated as such in the show's officially licensed translations. He also states that Shinji deserves koui (好意, lit. 'affection, kindness'). Evangelion Chronicle further noted that, although Asuka and Hikari share a conversation in a bedroom scene, Asuka avoids eye contact, in contrast to Shinji and Kaworu, who look directly into each other's eyes.

Controversies have arisen over the nature of Shinji and Kaworu's relationship, as has the nature of Kaworu's character. Several scholars, including cultural critic Hiroki Azuma, have argued that Shinji develops a homosexual attraction or curiosity toward Kaworu, or that their relationship remains deliberately ambiguous rather than purely platonic. In his book Anime Explosion!, writer Patrick Drazen expresses the view that Kaworu's offer of apparent love for Shinji is a tactic that he uses as the last Angel to disarm Shinji. Drazen reports that some believe that whether Kaworu as an Angel has any concept of sexuality is unclear because of the way he is presented in the series. Lynzee Loveridge of Anime News Network interpreted Kaworu as a negative figure, saying that "Kaworu's kindness has a nefarious side", seeing him as an Angel who deceives and uses Shinji for his own purposes. For Mike Crandol he "is representative of blind, total and unconditional love and acceptance, but like those things Kaoru turns out to not be real at all". Kentaro Takekuma, the editor of a book of interviews with Evangelion staff named Parano Evangelion, believes that for Shinji, Kaworu turns out to be the first friend he can trust and a homosexual romantic interest. Scholar Emily Wati Muir likewise described Kaworu as "a friend and a romantic interest" for Shinji.

Scholar Jessica Bauwens-Sugimoto described Shinji and Kaworu's relationship as "an exceptional pairing for yaoi standards", noting that Kaworu enters the story only near the end of the series; she further argued that "the relationship is unstable and hazily defined, but it already transcends homosociality because of Kaworu's transgression of normative male (and human) boundaries". Writer Álvaro Arbonés argued that the entire episode appears carefully constructed to suggest a romantic subtext, while maintaining that its central theme ultimately concerns the possibility of a sincere friendship free from toxicity. Mechademia writer Mariana Ortega further noted that a figure resembling Kaworu appears in one scene of The End of Evangelion to comfort Shinji; according to Ortega, the sequence "arguably adds homosociality and unresolved homosexual desires to the list of issues impeding Shinji's sexual and psychic maturation". Vrai Kaiser similarly argued that Kaworu represents "Shinji's understanding of 'love' during Instrumentality, and is the 'important person' who breaches his AT field". Kotono Mitsuishi and Megumi Hayashibara, Japanese voice actresses of Misato Katsuragi and Rei Ayanami, compared the two to Orihime and Hikoboshi, two legendary lovers of the Japanese tanabata myth. Megumi Ogata, Shinji's voice actress, rejected the notion of Kaworu as his lover, or that he is someone he can depend on, but instead sees him as a friend that is his equal. Director Anno stated in several interviews that he did not particularly have the yaoi audience in mind while making the series and that, although Shinji blushes, the character is not inclined to "carnal desires" in the episode. Masayuki likewise explained that the staff paid little attention to the yaoi audience during production; he also recalled that Kaworu was originally supposed only to brush against Shinji's hand, but the animators exaggerated the gesture and production constraints prevented the staff from correcting it.

== Reception ==
"The Beginning and the End, or "Knockin' on Heaven's Door"" was first broadcast on 13 March 1996 and drew a 6% audience share on Japanese television. The episode ranked first with 623 votes in the 1997 Anime Grand Prix, the annual readers' poll conducted by Animage magazine. Kaworu likewise placed second in the Best Male Character category, behind only Shinji Ikari. In July 2020, Comic Book Resources reported an 8.6/10 rating for the installment on IMDb, making it the fourth-highest-rated Evangelion episode. Merchandise based on the episode, including a line of official T-shirts, has been released.

The public and anime critics, including Screen Rant and Comic Book Resources, received Kaworu with widespread acclaim. Kaworu's introduction also received an especially enthusiastic response from female audiences. Reviewers praised his relationship with Shinji as one of anime's strongest portrayals of queer intimacy and as unusually progressive for its time. Lynzee Loveridge of Anime News Network praised the development of their relationship, finding it "refreshing". Other reviewers negatively received the episode. According to the website Otaquest, detractors have labeled Kaworu as a "yaoi fuel", "while others see him as a vital piece of the Evangelion puzzle". Akio Nagatomi of The Anime Café criticized the reuse of designs from Gunbuster, the series' reliance on clichés, and the characterization of its protagonists—particularly Shinji, whom he argued never undergoes meaningful development. Anime News Network writer Kenneth Lee criticized Kaworu as "an enigmatic figure that further adds fuel to the fire of confusion, but he just manages to raise even more questions that remain unanswered". Lee considers their relationship to be "disturbing, gratuitous, and unnecessary". According to Lee, the openness Shinji shows towards Kaworu is implausible and "irrational": "Ultimately, the homosexuality issue seems nothing more than cheap shock value tactics to stun Generation X".

"The Beginning and the End, or 'Knockin' on Heaven's Door'" is generally considered one of the best of the series, and Tabris' fight with Shinji was also received positively by critics. Comic Book Resources editor Reuben Baron, in particular, described Kaworu's death as "the most dramatic example" of the narrative seriousness of Neon Genesis Evangelion later episodes. According to Kotaku's Alex Walker, the episode represents Evangelion at its psychological peak, portraying the emotional collapse of Asuka, Misato, and especially Shinji following Kaworu's brief friendship and death. Screen Rant's Jack Cameron feels his confrontation with Shinji is, "Perhaps the most heartbreaking of fights in the whole series". Kaworu's last scenes were also appreciated by anime critic Chris Beveridge. Comic Book Resources editor Ajay Aravind mentioned Kaworu's descent into Terminal Dogma among the Evangelion scenes that changed the anime landscape forever. Critics particularly praised the final still image of the sequence, depicting Kaworu in Eva-01's hand, calling it both an exemplary use of the still frame as a directorial device and one of the series "iconic" images.
