= Kara =

Kara or KARA may refer to:

== Geography ==
=== Localities ===
- Kara, Chad, a sub-prefecture
- Kára, Hungary, a village
- Kara, Uttar Pradesh, India, a township
- Kara, Iran, a village in Lorestan Province
- Kara, Republic of Dagestan, a rural locality in Dagestan, Russia
- Kara, Sardauna, a village in Sardauna, Nigeria
- Kara, Papua New Guinea, a town on Bougainville Island in Papua New Guinea
- Kara, Togo, a city in northern Togo
  - Kara Region
  - Roman Catholic Diocese of Kara, Togo
- Gaya confederacy or Kara, a former confederation in the southern Korean peninsula
- Kara crater, a meteorite crater in northern Russia

=== Rivers, Seas ===
- Kara (river), a river in northern Russia, flowing into the Kara Sea
- Kara River (disambiguation), other rivers named Kara
- Kara Lake, Bolivia
- Kara Sea, a sea in the Arctic Ocean
- Kara Strait, a strait in Russia

== People ==
- Kara (name), a surname and given name, and a list of people with the name
- Kara people, an ethnic group in South Sudan, exceeding 100,000 members
- Kara people (Tanzania), an ethnic group, estimated 86,000 members
- Kara language (disambiguation)

== Film and television ==
- Kara Film Festival, a film festival held at Karachi, Pakistan
- "Kara" (Smallville episode)
- "Kara" (Supergirl episode)
- Kara, a 2012 short CGI film, which anticipates Detroit: Become Human
- Kara (film), 2026 Indian film by Vignesh Raja

== Music ==
- Kara (South Korean group), a girl group
- Kara (British band), a folk music group

== Other uses ==
- Kara (gastropod), a genus of land snails
- Kara (Sikhism), a type of a steel bracelet
- KARA (FM), a radio station licensed to Williams, California, United States
- KARA (New Mexico), a defunct radio station formerly licensed to Albuquerque, New Mexico, United States
- Kara class cruiser, a Soviet warship class
- Acadiana Regional Airport's ICAO code
- Korea Automobile Racing Association

== See also ==
- Kara Kara (disambiguation)
- Kar (disambiguation)
- Cara (disambiguation)
- Khara (disambiguation)
- Kiara (disambiguation)
- Qara (disambiguation)
- Karnataka or Kara Nataka, a state in southern India
