= Khar =

Khar may refer to:

== Places ==
- Khar, Mumbai, a suburb of Mumbai, India
- Khar, Punjab, a town in the Punjab Province, Pakistan
- Khar, Bajaur, a town in the Bajaur Agency of Khyber Pakhtunkhwa Province, Pakistan
- Khar, Nepal, a village in Darchula District, Nepal

== Names ==
- Khar (tribe) a tribe in South Punjab
- Hina Rabbani Khar (born 1977), foreign minister of Pakistan
- Ghulam Mustafa Khar (born 1937), former governor of Punjab province in Pakistan

== Other uses ==
- KHAR, a radio station in Anchorage, Alaska, United States
- Khar, an Ancient Egyptian unit of measurement used for volume
- Khar, an Ancient Egyptian term used to designate the geographical region encompassing Canaan and Syria

== See also ==
- Khar Lake (disambiguation)
- Khara (disambiguation)
- Kar (disambiguation)
