= K. nepalensis =

K. nepalensis may refer to:

- Kar nepalensis, a ground beetle
- Kerria nepalensis, a scale insect
- Kobresia nepalensis, a bog sedge
- Krananda nepalensis, a geometer moth
