= Do You Love Me? (Neon Genesis Evangelion) =

- Neon Genesis Evangelion episode
- Shinji Ikari during one of the episode's introspective sequences
- Episode no.: Episode 25
- Directed by: Kazuya Tsurumaki
- Written by: Hideaki Anno
- Original air date: 20 March 1996
- Running time: 22 minutes

Episode chronology
← Previous "The Beginning and the End, or "Knockin' on Heaven's Door""	Next → "Take Care of Yourself"

"Do You Love Me?" (Note: Japanese: 終わる世界, Hepburn: Owaru sekai; lit. 'The Ending World') is the twenty-fifth and penultimate episode of the Japanese anime television series Neon Genesis Evangelion, created by the animation studio Gainax. Series director Hideaki Anno wrote the episode and developed its storyboards alongside Kazuya Tsurumaki, who directed it. The episode follows Shinji Ikari, the teenage pilot of Evangelion Unit-01 for the paramilitary organization Nerv, as he grapples with having killed Kaworu Nagisa in the preceding episode. As a plan to merge human consciousness begins, Shinji, Rei Ayanami, Asuka Langley Soryu, and Misato Katsuragi confront their fears and memories through a series of introspective exchanges.

Gainax originally planned a conventional climax involving a large-scale battle, but severe scheduling problems forced the staff to discard a completed script and substantially revise the planned conclusion. The staff rewrote most of "Do You Love Me?" in just two weeks. The staff consequently relied heavily on editing and previously produced animation. The finished episode largely replaces conventional action in favor of internal monologues, still images, intertitles, reused footage, abrupt visual discontinuities, and other experimental techniques. Anno drew on psychoanalysis while developing the series' final episodes, and critics and scholars have linked "Do You Love Me?" to concepts associated with Sigmund Freud, Søren Kierkegaard, and R. D. Laing. The episode's English title itself derives from Laing's book Do You Love Me? An Entertainment in Conversation and Verse.

"Do You Love Me?" first aired on TV Tokyo on March 20, 1996. Its unconventional approach contributed to controversy over the television conclusion of Neon Genesis Evangelion. Some critics objected to its abrupt shift from the series' earlier science-fiction and mecha narrative to psychological introspection, as well as its abstract imagery, extended still frames, and reduced focus on plot development. Others praised Anno's experimental direction and the episode's focus on Shinji's mental state, self-acceptance, and relationships with others, seeing its introspective structure as a fitting culmination of the series' psychological themes. Gainax later produced the film The End of Evangelion (1997), which offers an alternative ending to the series. According to official materials, the television and film versions represent separate conclusions that branch from the same point in the story and develop differently, although they share the same basic thematic framework.

== Plot ==
Shinji Ikari, the teenage pilot of the giant mecha Evangelion Unit-01, operated by the paramilitary organization Nerv, is tormented by having killed Kaworu Nagisa, the final Angel, one of the mysterious beings that threaten humanity, and wonders whether he should continue piloting. When Shinji says he pilots to protect humanity and because others are kind to him, Asuka Langley Soryu, the pilot of Evangelion Unit-02, accuses him of seeking validation from others. Rei Ayanami, the pilot of Evangelion Unit-00, in turn confronts Asuka about her own dependence on other people. Asuka is shown curled in a fetal position inside Eva-02 at the bottom of a lake, lamenting that her inability to pilot has deprived her of her value. Rei tells her that she fears loneliness because her sense of identity depends on others. Three incarnations of Rei then question the nature of their shared identity, concluding that their identities are shaped by their relationships with others. They express a desire to die while also fearing the loss of their own existence. Gendo Ikari, Shinji's father and the commander of Nerv, appears before Rei and tells her that the time has come for her to fulfill the purpose for which she was created.

The Human Instrumentality Project then begins. Its aim is to merge humanity into a single collective consciousness, erasing the boundaries that separate individual minds. Shinji feels his consciousness expand as his sense of having a separate body begins to fade. Gendo describes the process as humanity's return to its lost mother, while Nerv scientist Ritsuko Akagi explains that people seek to fill an emptiness within their souls. The episode then turns to Nerv operations director Misato Katsuragi, exploring the contrast between her childhood desire to become a "good girl" for her mother and earn her absent father's approval and her adult relationships. The episode revisits Misato's relationship with her former lover Ryoji Kaji, including their sexual relationship. She acknowledges that Kaji reminded her of her father and that this resemblance contributed to their separation. The other characters then confront her about her tendency to use relationships to alleviate loneliness and the disparity between her public and private selves. The episode also explores Asuka's childhood, including her mother's mental breakdown and suicide, as well as her continuing fear of loneliness and abandonment despite her determination to live independently. Shinji and Misato appear beside Asuka. All three express their fear of abandonment and death. Their surroundings transform into an auditorium, where versions of Shinji and Misato watch their counterparts onstage. The characters recognize the process as Instrumentality and question the reliability of memory and individual perception. Shinji is finally told that he created the empty world around him through his desire to isolate himself from others and avoid emotional pain.

== Production ==
=== Background and staff ===
Neon Genesis Evangelion faced production difficulties, particularly during the second half of the series, due to time constraints and a tight production schedule. When the series began airing in October 1995, animation studio Gainax had completed only twelve of the planned twenty-six episodes after approximately two years of production, leaving the staff far less time to produce the remaining fourteen. These constraints had already affected the first episode, "Angel Attack", which took several months to complete, including six months spent writing its script. Hideaki Anno, the series' chief director and principal screenwriter, said in interviews that the writing process lacked a clear plan and compared the production to a "live performance". In 1993, Gainax prepared a proposal for the series that included synopses of all twenty-six planned episodes. From the thirteenth episode, "Lilliputian Hitcher", onward, however, the series diverged from the original plan. According to cultural critic Hiroki Azuma, who personally interviewed Anno, the director decided to change direction while the series was airing. After observing the reactions of anime fans, or otaku, whom he considered excessively withdrawn and introverted, Anno steered the second half of the series in a darker, more introspective direction. He moved away from the conventional linear narrative and a resolutive happy ending. Michael House, who worked as an English-language translator for Gainax at the time, recalled that Anno realized during production that he had created characters with excessive psychological difficulties. As a result, he changed direction in the second half of the series and abandoned his original scenario, in which the protagonists would mature and overcome their personal difficulties.

During production, Anno also developed an interest in the human psyche and psychoanalysis, and began exploring the workings of the human mind. He used this interest to express himself through the series. He had briefly encountered books on psychoanalysis at university and found them more interesting than his other reading. While writing the fourteenth episode, "Weaving a Story", Anno needed material for an introspective monologue by Rei Ayanami, whom he wanted to portray as a schizophrenic character. A friend then lent him a volume on mental illness from the Bessatsu Takarajima (別冊宝島) series, which contained a poem written by a person with a mental disorder. The poem profoundly affected him. Toshio Okada, a former Gainax member and longtime friend of Anno, also noted that the director often struggled to decide how to conclude the series. Anno himself said in an interview that he decided on the ending around the eighteenth or nineteenth episode. The nineteenth episode also marked the last time the production staff could pool all their remaining resources and work together as a team. Afterward, the production plan broke down, and the staff worked on individual episodes without knowing what would happen two episodes later. Gainax therefore tried to make the best use of its limited resources. The staff had far fewer animation cels at their disposal, and the visual quality of the animation also declined. Dissatisfaction grew among staff members, who questioned whether to continue working on the series when production conditions made satisfactory results impossible. The staff delivered episodes so close to their deadlines that TV Tokyo had insufficient time to review them before broadcast. For example, the staff completed the twenty-fourth episode in only three weeks. Masayuki handled most of the work, with Yoshiyuki Sadamoto assisting and ultimately saving the production. By then, the tight schedule had left the staff in a state of panic.

Hideaki Anno wrote the script for "Do You Love Me?" and worked on the storyboards with Kazuya Tsurumaki, who directed the episode. Masahiko Otsuka and Ken Ando served as assistant directors, while Takeshi Honda worked as chief animator.

=== Genesis and early drafts ===
Gainax's original proposal called for a large-scale battle and a definitive climax on the Moon. In the original scenario, twelve powerful enemies, known at the time as Apostolos, would descend from the Moon. The staff chose the Moon as the battle's setting because of its symbolic association with Rei and the series' ending theme, "Fly Me to the Moon". The staff also planned to depict a message across the Moon's surface in the final scenes, echoing the ending of the OVA series Gunbuster. Eva-06 and the entire American continent would disappear, while humanity would be powerless against the Apostolos and their overwhelming strength. The twenty-fifth episode, titled "Arqa, the Promised Land", would reveal that the laboratory where the story takes place housed the ancient ruins of a site called Arqa (アルカ, Aruka), which shared its name with a level of the underworld in Jewish tradition. To stop the twelve Apostolos, the United Nations would abandon the Human Instrumentality Project despite Gendo's objections. Shinji and the others would remain at the laboratory because of Rei Ayanami, and the following episode, "The Only Neat Thing to Do", would resolve all the story's mysteries as the laboratory faced destruction. According to Evangelion Chronicle, an official encyclopedia of the series, the concept of the twelve Apostolos might have a connection to the twelve Apostles in the Book of Revelation. Other proposed elements included the discovery at Arqa of cards containing records of its inhabitants' personalities, and the existence of two separate Arqas: one in Japan and another in Antarctica, the latter described as "the subterranean Antarctic kingdom discovered by Nazi Germany". The staff also envisioned a submarine at the bottom of the Nerv base, resting in a completely black body of water, beneath which things would become inverted. The planned conclusion also included a scene in which Gendo, as he parted from his son Shinji, would say "Live!" (生きろ, Ikiro), echoing the ending of Gainax's earlier work, Nadia: The Secret of Blue Water.

Mitsuo Iso, who wrote "Lilliputian Hitcher", also contributed ideas for the story. Iso proposed that Gendo would attempt to clone Yui from an isolated cell, fail, and then abandon Arqa. When Gendo returned three years later, he would discover a young Rei eating Arqa's flesh, in a scene resembling Kōshi Ankoku-den (孔子暗黒伝) by manga artist Daijirō Morohoshi. Iso also imagined Rei as composed of a lunar substance called Adamah and linked Arqa to the Moon. In the final episodes, an Angel would introduce itself to Rei as a messenger from the Moon and an emissary of Arqa. Iso further proposed that Gendo would pilot Eva-06 while the Japanese Self-Defense Forces confronted Nerv, with the confrontation ending when Gendo was shot down and crashed into Lake Ashi. Gendo would also engage in a psychological confrontation and make a pact with the twelve Angels, similar to the events depicted in Dororo by Osamu Tezuka, before merging with them and the Tree of Life in a scene modeled on "Jack and the Beanstalk". In another scene, Gendo would call Rei "Yui", and she would respond that she was not Yui. Rei would also kill either Gendo or Shinji to achieve rebirth without the karma of being Shinji's mother, an idea inspired by Ryū Murakami's Coin Locker Babies. The finished series omitted Arqa, establishing instead that the GeoFront, also known as the Egg of Lilith, had existed since ancient times. Scholar Taro Igarashi suggested that the Arqa ruins may have evolved into Nerv's base in the final script, noting that Fuyutsuki describes the base as a perfectly round cave in the twenty-first episode. Igarashi thus interpreted the GeoFront itself as "some sort of ancient ruin". Although the initial scenario envisioned twelve powerful Angels appearing in the final episodes, the final version features Zeruel in "Introjection", the twelfth Angel to attack in the series and its most powerful enemy. The theatrical conclusion also retains elements of the original proposal, including the United Nations' decision to destroy the laboratory against Gendo's wishes and conflicts between characters with opposing goals. In the film, the Japan Self-Defense Forces attack Nerv, Gendo clashes with Keel, and Ritsuko Akagi rebels.

=== Development ===
The production staff realized even before work began on "Introjection" that the production schedule made the planned large-scale battle sequence impossible to complete. Faced with these time constraints, Gainax ultimately discarded the script it had already completed for the twenty-fifth episode. The staff then rewrote "Do You Love Me?" almost entirely, but Anno kept his original concept for the last episode. Yoshiyuki Sadamoto and other staff members identified the lack of a clear connection between "Do You Love Me?" and the preceding episode as the main problem with the scripts for the concluding episodes. They believed the original script for "Do You Love Me?" would have provided a clearer link between the preceding episode and the finale. "Do You Love Me?" also introduced a section titled "Case 1", which explored Misato, Asuka, and the other characters. Gainax had planned to follow it with a "Case 2" in the final episode, but time constraints forced the staff to abandon this idea. Staff members also stated that the protagonist of Neon Genesis Evangelion changed in "Do You Love Me?" and the final episode, as the narrative became more personal. In their view, these episodes portrayed Anno's anguish rather than Shinji's, with piloting an Eva serving as a parallel to producing animation. Around this time, Anno began speaking with Toshimichi Ōtsuki, a King Records representative and producer of the series. Ōtsuki recalled that they spent hours talking at an establishment in Shinjuku. Anno listened as Ōtsuki discussed psychology, memories, and experiences that had affected him, speaking much like a university professor. Ōtsuki later recalled that the first part of "Do You Love Me?" drew on some material from those conversations.

The final draft of the episode included additional scenes, such as an image of Shinji alone with Misato that subsequently shatters, a longer exchange with Kaji about Misato's desire for children and sexual relationships, and an exchange, ultimately omitted, in which Rei declares that she is not a doll. Anno also recalled that the original plan called for Asuka to recover during "Do You Love Me?". The staff created approximately three to four hundred new animation cels for "Do You Love Me?" and used existing footage for the rest of the episode. Manga artist Kentaro Takekuma described the result as an unusually editing-intensive production, comparing the episode's narrative structure to a puzzle. According to the series' staff, Neon Genesis Evangelion employed directing and storytelling techniques that Gainax had previously used in the thirty-seventh episode of Nadia: The Secret of Blue Water, "Emperor Neo". During production, the staff almost completely reworked the episode in just two weeks. As with "Emperor Neo", Gainax coped with the limited production time by editing and reusing existing footage to construct a new narrative. Some staff members supported the final episodes, others considered them adequate, and a minority were dissatisfied. Anno maintained, however, that the staff could not have produced the episodes in any other form under the circumstances, and promised that they would remake them later. Despite these difficulties, Anno was satisfied with the final two episodes, believing that they reflected his state of mind at the time. Toshimichi Ōtsuki similarly believed Anno had genuinely intended to end the series this way. When asked about the philosophical complexity of the final two episodes, Sadamoto linked it to the difficulties Anno faced during production, describing the director as increasingly exhausted and close to depression. Some commentators speculated that complaints from the Parent-Teacher Association had led to censorship, but Anno maintained that the final result reflected his deliberate artistic decisions. Anno also viewed the plot as a way to bring a narrative to an end, even though that narrative continued for him personally. He described Neon Genesis Evangelion as his life transferred onto film and argued that, although the narrative continued, the television program still had to end.

=== Animation and style ===
One sequence in "Do You Love Me?" uses mirrored images resembling a Rorschach test, a device critics and scholars highlighted among the episode's abstract visual techniques.

"Do You Love Me?" and the final episode rely heavily on reused footage and still images, with much of their running time devoted to static images accompanied by monologues, dialogue, or white text on black backgrounds. The episodes also employ shifting animation cels, rapid horizontal movements, and variations in frame speed to suggest motion in otherwise static images. Alex Nguyen of Inverse described the final episodes' exploration of the characters' psychology as a form of abstract animation. Other visual techniques include Rorschach test-like mirrored images, photographs, images of dead Nerv personnel, and collages of footage from earlier episodes. José Andrés Santiago Iglesias argued that these techniques deliberately disorient viewers and that prolonged stillness can evoke discomfort and alienation. Susan J. Napier likewise emphasized the frequent use of still images, arguing that they interrupt the flow of fast-paced imagery, hold viewers' attention, and direct it toward Shinji's psychological state and memories. William D. Routt similarly argued that the images encourage viewers to animate the sequences "psychologically, compositionally, and even artistically through the ways in which the images call attention to themselves as images".

The A.V. Club described the finale as setting aside the climax of the series' central conflict to explore Shinji's unconscious, while Perry Gottschalk described the episodes as unfolding within a "psyche-space" created by the Human Instrumentality, where Shinji's struggle with self-doubt reaches its climax. /Film editor Soham Gadre described the episodes as taking a "visionary and surreal" turn, comparing their depiction of Instrumentality to dreamlike vignettes or a subliminal therapy program. Gadre observed that "Do You Love Me?" alternates scenes from Shinji's life and memories with title cards posing direct personal questions, voiced by other characters or an unnamed narrator. Scholar Giuseppe Gatti characterized the conclusion as "surrealist" in form, interpreting its combination of reused imagery and other visual techniques as an exploration of Shinji's unconscious rather than a conventional narrative resolution, and as a rejection of classical or cathartic storytelling in favor of an open ending. Routt argued that the stillness of the climax encourages viewers to interpret it psychologically while drawing attention to the constructed nature of the narration. Zoltan Kacsuk suggested that the increasing frequency of intertitles reflects the difficulty of depicting complex internal emotional states through animation.

Academic Ida Kirkegaard examined the prominent reuse of existing animation with newly recorded dialogue in the introspective sequences of "Do You Love Me?", comparing this technique with a similar sequence in the sixteenth episode, "Splitting of the Breast". She focused on a previously used shot of Asuka wearing a towel, originally set in Misato's kitchen, which appears in both episodes with different dialogue. Kirkegaard argued that reusing the shot changed its function from depicting Asuka herself to representing Shinji's impression of her. In "Do You Love Me?", Shinji converses with an image of Asuka assembled from unrelated stock animation cuts. Her clothing changes between shots, while the original background of Misato's apartment gives way to the same black void that surrounds Shinji. Kirkegaard argued that these conspicuous discontinuities present Asuka as an assemblage of Shinji's memories and impressions rather than an autonomous character, while the newly recorded dialogue distinguishes the sequence from the conventional reuse of animation to depict a memory. She also observed that every shot of Asuka in the sequence uses stock animation except for two shots featuring both characters, whereas all but one of Shinji's shots are newly drawn. Kirkegaard considered this contrast deliberate, arguing that the repeated cuts give the characters' memories and impressions an uncanny, malleable quality. She considered the technique particularly prominent in "Do You Love Me?", where Shinji and other characters undergo similar introspective "interrogations" through recombined images representing their impressions of one another. By contrast, she argued that reused cuts in the series' control-room sequences preserve a sense of coherent physical space, whereas the conspicuous discontinuities in "Do You Love Me?" correspond to an internal, psychological world.

=== Music ===
In addition to the original score composed by Shirō Sagisu, "Do You Love Me?" opens with "Ode to Joy" from the fourth movement of German composer Ludwig van Beethoven's Ninth Symphony, which had also appeared in the preceding episode. Scholar Rose Bridges described Beethoven's Ninth Symphony as one of the series' most iconic musical choices, arguing that Evangelion gave the piece a disturbing effect different from its association with scenes of extreme violence in Stanley Kubrick's A Clockwork Orange (1971). Susan J. Napier argued that Anno abandoned the spectacular imagery and relentless action associated with apocalyptic science fiction to explore an "apocalyptic psyche"; she identified disorienting music, stark imagery, photomontages, and disturbing voice-overs among the devices used to achieve this effect. "Do You Love Me?" uses "Borderline Case" (A-4), which combines synthesized vocalise with percussion. Evangelion frequently uses the piece in scenes depicting the characters' inner worlds. The episode also uses a variant of A-4 consisting solely of its synthesized vocalise. "Rei I" (A-1) serves as Rei Ayanami's theme and accompanies her scene of inner conflict in "Do You Love Me?". The Refrain of Evangelion album booklet described the melody as evoking sadness. The piece opens with a seven-note phrase played on solo piano, followed by an ethereal main melody marked "gently and mysteriously" in the score. After the theme repeats, the opening phrase returns with lower strings, after which the harp and piano intertwine in a recurring descending figure. The opening phrase later reappears in the brass, followed by another statement of Rei's theme on solo piano; the lingering descending figure then accompanies the conclusion for harp, cello, and full ensemble. Writer Masaki Miyakawa compared "Rei I" to Ryūichi Sakamoto's compositions and the opening theme of Nausicaä of the Valley of the Wind (1984), while scholar Heike Hoffer noted that Rei's theme featured piano harmonies reminiscent of Debussy. The episode's ending theme is a version of "Fly Me to the Moon" titled "Rei (#25) TV Size Version" and performed by Megumi Hayashibara.

=== Voice acting ===
Megumi Hayashibara, Rei's voice actress, voices three incarnations of the character during Rei's internal monologue, subtly varying her delivery for each. Rei II, for example, speaks in a comparatively gentle tone, while the child Rei has a "ruthless" personality. Kotono Mitsuishi similarly voices three aspects of Misato during her internal monologue: the younger Misato speaking with Kaji, her emotional side, and her analytical and critical side. The episode's liner notes explained that Misato's monologue follows the structure of Rei's preceding scene and compared its three-way internal dialogue to the Magi System, Nerv's computer system divided into three personalities. Sadamoto recalled that Mitsuishi cried while reading the script for "Do You Love Me?", prompting Anno to make a victory gesture. When Sadamoto told him that his manga editor had reacted the same way, Anno repeated the gesture and declared, "We won".

== Cultural references ==
The English title "Do You Love Me?" derives from British psychiatrist R. D. Laing's book Do You Love Me? An Entertainment in Conversation and Verse The Neon Genesis Evangelion Encyclopedia included with the Italian Platinum Edition described the episode as a visual adaptation of Laing's distinctive literary style, characterized by conversations between unidentified individuals. "Do You Love Me?" and the following episode were also likened to Mamoru Oshii's film Talking Head (1992), but Anno rejected the comparison, stating that he had never seen the film. Anno described the finale's theatrical presentation as a play-within-a-play. Writer Dennis Redmond likewise observed that "Do You Love Me?" "draws extensively on theatrical tropes – spotlights, character monologues, and simple stage props – borrowed from East Asia's thriving theater culture". Writer Mario Pasqualini noted that the Japanese term za (座), used in the title of the fourteenth episode, could refer to a theater or stage, and linked this meaning to the theatrical setting of the television finale. Anno also explained that the finale's exploration of the characters beyond their outward appearances drew on Sigmund Freud's concept of the "good mother" and "bad mother" during the oral stage. According to Anno, a child initially perceives a nurturing mother and an irritable or restrictive mother as separate figures, and can perceive another person as an individual only after recognizing both aspects within the same personality. Japanese critics Eiji Ōtsuka and Tetsuya Miyazaki also compared Shinji's lengthy interior monologues in the television finale to brainwashing or psychotherapy.

Yahata Shoten's Evangelion Glossary (エヴァンゲリオン用語事典, Evangerion Yougo Jiten) examined the characters' interpersonal difficulties through the psychological concept of attachment behavior (愛着行動, aichaku kōdō), a term that appears as an on-screen caption during the analysis of Asuka. The Evangelion liner notes described attachment as a psychiatric term for the reciprocal relationship between an infant and its mother or other attachment figure, distinguishing early affective behavior directed toward multiple objects from selective attachment to a specific person, which they termed a "bond". They characterized Asuka's behavior as "attachment behavior" and Rei's as a "bond". The episode's liner notes also suggested that Asuka's relationship with Eva-02 could represent a form of attachment. The Evangelion Glossary suggested that Shinji's difficulty expressing emotion toward others stemmed from the loss of his mother during childhood and his subsequent separation from his father. In Asuka's case, it interpreted her efforts to reject childish behavior and "become an adult" as a way to gain recognition after her mother's psychological breakdown; her mother's subsequent suicide deprived her of an attachment figure. In "Do You Love Me?", Asuka also criticizes Shinji after he says that he is "doing his best for other people". The Evangelion Glossary linked the exchange to the psychological concept of dependence (依存, izon), which it defined as reliance on something or someone else. Shinji remains fixated on having killed Kaworu and attempts to suppress the thought by reminding himself that Kaworu was an Angel. The Glossary identified this as an example of obsession (強迫観念, kyōhaku kannen), which it defined as a persistent thought that a person cannot dismiss. The episode also explores separation anxiety (分離不安, bunri fuan), which the Glossary defined as anxiety or sadness caused by separation from an attachment figure; it noted that the phenomenon can also affect adults experiencing separation or loneliness. Evangelion Chronicle identified this anxiety in Asuka's internal world, where she expresses her fear of loneliness and of being left completely alone.

== Academic analysis and themes ==
From the second half of the series onward, the characters' inner lives become a central focus of Neon Genesis Evangelion. The series explores interpersonal communication through streams of consciousness sequences involving its main characters. This narrative technique, used in the fourteenth, sixteenth and twentieth episodes of the series, culminates in the final two episodes, in which the narrative unfolds entirely through the characters' dialogue and internal monologues. Writer Simon Richmond characterized them as "a self-consciously arty and abstract examination of the main characters' inner thoughts and demons". Anime scholar Susan J. Napier argued that, rather than concluding with a cataclysmic struggle, the two episodes shifted abruptly toward an unexpected form of closure and presented Shinji's inner psychological world as an exploration of the nature of reality itself. Scholars Víctor Sellés de Lucas and Manuel Hernández-Pérez similarly described the final two episodes as a fragmented narrative focused on Shinji's inner world, contrasting their reused footage, extended voice-overs, and live-action sequences with the action-driven episodes that precede them. Anime Herald interpreted their almost abstract storyboards as reflecting internal turmoil rather than external action and connected Anno's visual storytelling with the series' philosophical themes. Paul M. Malone likewise argued that the final two episodes moved away from action to examine Shinji's identity and self-worth, using flashbacks and abstract animation both to envision him as an integrated individual and to deconstruct him as a fictional character.

In "Do You Love Me?", Shinji's mind serves as the episode's principal mise-en-scène, as he faces questions about his fears and reasons for piloting the Eva. Napier argued that his answers challenged conventions of the mecha genre: Shinji identifies his father as his greatest fear and admits that he pilots the Eva to gain others' approval. Rei and Asuka face similar questioning, with Napier describing Rei's interrogation as shifting from psychoanalytic to metaphysical questions as she questions her identity and relationship with other minds. Mio Bryce, Paul Cheung, and Anna Katrina Gutierrez likewise interpreted the final episodes as examinations of each protagonist's subjectivity. They argued that Rei's confrontation with her multiple bodies prompted her to assert an individual identity shaped by her relationships with others; her subsequent desire to die and "return to nothing", in their interpretation, emphasized death as a component of human subjectivity and agency. Writer Gabriel Tsang argued that the latter episodes' monologues explored the meaning of personal existence, relating them to the nihilistic contexts of post-traumatic Europe and over-capitalized Japan. He described the conclusion as an "existential self-counselling" in which the characters' individual autonomy took precedence over the machines they pilot. Scholar Nikolai Afanasov similarly interpreted the stylistic shift as a means of portraying the characters' internal suffering. Writers Andreu Ballús and Alícia Torrents extended this psychological confrontation to viewers, interpreting Shinji's story as a "trap" that exposed and challenged the spectator's passive or comfortable position. In their reading, the challenge facing Shinji also confronts the viewer.

=== Philosophy and character exploration ===
After killing Kaworu in the previous episode, Shinji continues to struggle with Kaworu's death and confronts his longstanding frustrations in "Do You Love Me?". In the opening scene, which revisits the final scene of the previous episode, Misato tries to convince him that he did nothing wrong, because Kaworu wanted to die. The latter part of the scene differs, however, as it takes place within Shinji's inner world. In the final dialogue, the other characters tell Shinji that he wanted to shut himself away in a solitary world free from unpleasant things. Evangelion Chronicle linked the episode's Japanese title, "The Ending World", to Shinji's own end of the world; it described the episode as showing him a "conditional ending in which he rejects what is unpleasant and seeks a more solitary world". The publication also interpreted the image of the enormous Eva-01 looming over the diminutive Shinji in his inner world as suggesting that he was about to be swallowed by a demon dwelling within his own mind. Shinji confronts his own conflicting thoughts, revealing the extent of his suffering. Writer Andrew M. Winters wrote that Shinji "visits questions dealing with his self-worth, self-identity, and our hatred towards others" during this process. During the episode, the French philosophical term raison d'être (レゾンデートル, rezon dētoru), meaning "reason for being", also features. Shinji repeatedly questions his own raison d'être, asking why he is allowed to exist. Heather Browning and Walter Veit viewed Shinji's questioning of his raison d'être in "Do You Love Me?" as part of the series' broader search for meaning and personal identity, relating these existential concerns to Albert Camus's philosophical question of whether life is worth living.

Browning and Veit understood Human Instrumentality as dissolving the psychological boundaries between individuals and, consequently, the individual self. They related Instrumentality to Martin Heidegger's distinction between authentic existence and the loss of the self in the anonymous collective of "the They". Evangelion Chronicle likewise described Instrumentality as a process intended to compensate for the deficiencies in each person's psyche and thereby resolve the anxiety and fear arising from them. In the latter half of "Do You Love Me?", Shinji describes feeling his own form disappear; the episode's liner notes linked this sensation to the twentieth episode, in which Shinji dissolves inside Eva-01's cockpit. In the following scenes, Ritsuko describes a fundamental emptiness in the human soul that produces fear and that people have continually sought to fill. Writer Luka Perušić identified the alternative to this condition as the pursuit of eternal existence, connecting it to the desire to ascend to a higher plane of existence by overcoming human limitations. Scholar Betty Stojnic interpreted Shinji's experience of Instrumentality in "Do You Love Me?", in which the boundaries of his body begin to dissolve, in terms of Gilles Deleuze and Félix Guattari's concept of "absolute deterritorialization". In her reading, Instrumentality shifted the series' focus from human relationships toward more abstract questions about existence and identity.

As Instrumentality unfolds, Rei confronts questions about her identity and seeks answers about the meaning of her existence. Three manifestations of Rei appear during this interrogation; the Neon Genesis Evangelion Encyclopedia identified one as Rei I and described Rei II as the only incarnation that still existed and as finding her own raison d'être in her relationship with Gendo. Rei asserts that her identity as Rei Ayanami has developed over time through her interactions with others; Browning and Veit interpreted this as illustrating how relationships with others shape and transform individual identity. They similarly argued that Shinji ultimately finds meaning and defines his identity through his relationships with others, while retaining the separation necessary for an individual self to exist. Rei's assertion prompted writer Gionathan C. Pacheco to describe Neon Genesis Evangelion as a "manifesto against individualistic escapism". The Evangelion Chronicle encyclopedia connected Rei's inner monologue, in which the Self emerges from relationships with others, to the ideas Danish philosopher Søren Kierkegaard presented in his essay The Sickness Unto Death. "Do You Love Me?" also explores Asuka's fear of loneliness and Misato's past and psychology, featuring a scene with a fan that alludes to a summer episode in which Misato and Kaji spent an entire week in bed. During the scene, Misato says that she must not cry and must instead become a "good girl"; as she speaks, scattered building blocks assemble into a rocket-like shape that the storyboard labels "a symbol of the penis" (ペニスの象徴, penisu no shōchō). The episode's liner notes considered whether Misato's refusal to cry represented an attempt to acquire masculine traits and whether this had shaped her behavior. Writer Jake Potter argued that Kierkegaard's work, referenced in the title of the series' sixteenth episode, influenced Evangelion and particularly its final two episodes, through Kierkegaard's concept of despair. During her monologue, Misato initially claims to be happy before admitting that she is not and that she does not recognize the self she presents to others as her true self. Potter linked this conflict to Kierkegaardian despair, arguing that Misato's fundamental problem was that her self was "broken". He similarly interpreted Shinji as an embodiment of Kierkegaardian despair.

=== Relationship with The End of Evangelion ===
The End of Evangelion incorporates images first shown in "Do You Love Me?", including the bodies of Misato Katsuragi and Ritsuko Akagi.

Following the conclusion of the television series, Gainax produced The End of Evangelion (1997), offering another conclusion to the original series. The film incorporates images from "Do You Love Me?", including Eva-02 and Asuka at the bottom of a lake and the corpses of Ritsuko and Misato. The End of Evangelion develops these scenes further, depicting Gendo and Rei reaching their "promised time" and the details of Ritsuko and Misato's deaths. In the theatrical version, the Human Instrumentality Project is presented as an attempt to incorporate humanity, regarded as an incomplete collective, into a complete, unified being; the ultimate form of Instrumentality depends on Shinji's choice while aboard Eva-01. Critics and scholars have offered differing interpretations of the relationship between the two endings. Some regarded them as essentially the same ending viewed from different perspectives. Others characterized the film as an alternative or semi-alternative ending, while others described The End of Evangelion as a remake of the television series' final two episodes.

Andreu Ballús and Alba G. Torrents treated them as separate conclusions, describing the television finale as a therapeutic departure from conventional narrative that addressed the spectator directly. Stevie Suan contrasted the optimistic television ending with the film's darker tone, arguing that they presented different conceptions of the self and its relationship with the world. Minori Ishida by contrast, described The End of Evangelion as an elaboration of the final two television episodes providing a definitive ending, while Gabriel Tsang called it a more explicit conclusion. Paul M. Malone suggested that neither ending necessarily depicts a reality beyond Shinji's psyche, contrasting Gendo's apparent victory over Seele in the television version with Seele's violent pursuit of its program in the film. Gavin McDowell also contrasted the television finale's replacement of climactic confrontation with Shinji's internal struggle with the film, emphasizing the ambiguity of their relationship. Malone nonetheless interpreted both versions as depictions of identity crises in which Shinji's world collapses and he must reconstruct himself and his relationship with it. Rufus Manji described the film as Anno's alternative ending, contrasting the television version's more positive conclusion with the film's more cynical treatment of Shinji's relationship with others.

According to Carl Gustav Horn, editor of the English edition of the Neon Genesis Evangelion manga, before the release of The End of Evangelion Anno said that the film would present the television ending from a different perspective. Official materials described the film as both a remake and an alternative ending to the original series finale. The series' official booklets also explained that the two were distinct endings that shared the same themes and basic framework, comparing them to identical twins, "different people with the same genes". According to Evangelion Chronicle, the original ending and The End of Evangelion differed substantially in their modes of expression despite sharing a common essence; The End of Evangelion focused on the plot, whereas the television series focused on themes, minimizing narrative elements. Hideaki Anno himself compared the two endings to a multi-ending video game. Animator Yūichirō Oguro, editor of the extra materials from the Japanese home video editions of the series, observed that "Do You Love Me?" examined Misato and revealed the reasons for her lively, action-oriented behavior, while The End of Evangelion placed her back at the center of the action and depicted her dying while trying to save Shinji, in contrast to her portrayal in the television finale. The official encyclopedia Evangelion Chronicle likewise noted that Shinji encountered a side of Misato she herself had tried to hide from other people, while in the film she spoke about her weak points, allowing Shinji to discover the "true Misato" in a different way from the television finale. According to Neon Genesis Evangelion assistant director Kazuya Tsurumaki, Shinji's characterization had also changed in the film "in terms of emotional flow". Tsurumaki attributed this difference to the production timeline: the staff created the film almost a year after completing the preceding television episodes, whereas "Do You Love Me?" remained more "emotionally linked" to them.

== Reception ==
"Do You Love Me?" was first broadcast on March 20, 1996, and achieved a 7.7% television audience rating in Japan. Merchandise based on the episode, including a line of official T-shirts, was subsequently released. "Do You Love Me?" and the series finale sparked considerable discussion and mixed reactions among fans following their broadcast. Los Angeles Times writer Charles Solomon noted that the final episodes provoked heated debate almost immediately after their broadcast, as some viewers regarded them as profound while others questioned their meaning. The Mainichi Times wrote that after the broadcast of the penultimate episode, "nearly all viewers felt betrayed ... When commentator Eiji Ōtsuka sent a letter to the Yomiuri Shimbun, complaining about the end of the Evangelion series, the debate went nationwide".

Kenneth Lee of Anime News Network criticized the television finale's abrupt shift from the series' mecha narrative to psychological introspection, characterizing its visuals as a mixture of "recycled, jumbled images and long still-frame cut scenes". He argued that the change abandoned the narrative developed in earlier episodes and left the conclusion disconnected from the rest of the series. Akio Nagatomi of The Anime Café praised Anno's visual experimentation but found the final episodes inconsistent with the rest of the series and the conclusion disappointing. Max Covill of Film School Rejects criticized "Do You Love Me?" for excessive "psychobabble", comparing it to a therapy session rather than the combination of battles, humor, and character drama that, in his view, defined the series at its best. Despite acknowledging its dramatic emphasis, he argued that the episode offered little else. Yahoo! criticized "Do You Love Me?" for abandoning the preceding science-fiction plot in favor of the characters' internal monologues. The review argued that the episode lacked both the earlier narrative's "thrills and mysteries" and the playfulness of the series finale, finding the result boring and irritating. Reuben Baron of Comic Book Resources called "Do You Love Me?" "dreadfully boring", arguing that it restated the characters' psychological problems didactically while leaving the plot static.

Randy Miller III of DVD Talk found "Do You Love Me?" difficult to follow and potentially alienating, but praised its relatively structured presentation. However, discussing the final two episodes together, he found them confusing, describing the conclusion as an "emotional fizzle rather than a bang". Rafael Motamayor of SlashFilm praised the final two episodes, arguing that Anno turned the production's limitations into "a beautiful piece of abstract animation". He described the two-part finale as a metaphysical group therapy session and regarded its introspective focus as a fitting culmination of the series' exploration of loneliness, self-acceptance, and human connection. He subsequently called the two-part finale one of anime's most "emotionally powerful" endings and praised its therapy-session-like resolution of Shinji's arc as "a brilliant choice", finding the result both epic and intimate. Daniel Dockery of Syfy Wire defended the final two episodes, describing himself as "quite fond" of their story and arguing that their focus on Shinji's mental state provided a fitting conclusion to his character arc. He characterized Shinji's eventual self-acceptance as a haunting form of optimism consistent with the series' psychological concerns. Rob Bricken of Gizmodo favored the television finale over the franchise's subsequent endings, praising the final two episodes for emphasizing Shinji's examination and acceptance of himself, his flaws, and his relationships with others.
