= Kara River (disambiguation) =

Kara River may refer to:

- Kara River (North Asia), flows into the Kara Sea in northern Russia
- Kara (Shilka tributary), a tributary of the Shilka in Zabaykalsky Krai, eastern Russia
- Kara River (Togo)
- Kara River (Central Asia)

== See also ==
- Kara (disambiguation)
- Karasu (disambiguation) – "Su", literally 'water', may also mean 'river' or 'stream'
