= Take Care of Yourself (Neon Genesis Evangelion) =

- Neon Genesis Evangelion episode
- Episode no.: Episode 26
- Directed by: Masayuki; Kazuya Tsurumaki
- Written by: Hideaki Anno
- Original air date: March 27, 1996
- Running time: 23 minutes

Episode chronology
← Previous "Do You Love Me?"	Next → —

"Take Care of Yourself", also known by its Japanese title "The Beast that Shouted 'I' at the Heart of the World" (世界の中心でアイを叫んだけもの), is the twenty-sixth and final episode of Hideaki Anno's anime series Neon Genesis Evangelion, produced by Gainax. The episode was written by the series director Hideaki Anno and directed by Kazuya Tsurumaki and Masayuki. The episode follows the same abstract format as its predecessor, "Do You Love Me?", primarily focusing on the psychology of teenage protagonist and Evangelion Unit-01 pilot Shinji Ikari, as he deals with his self-hatred, fear of rejection, and uncertainty regarding his identity.

"Take Care of Yourself" aired originally on TV Tokyo on March 27, 1996 and, like its predecessor, divided critics and audiences. Many criticized the abrupt narrative shift, the abstract imagery, and the unsolved character arcs, but others praised the focus on Shinji's path to self-acceptance and viewed it as the culmination to the series' long-running psychological themes. A year later, Gainax produced The End of Evangelion (1997), which provides a different ending to the series.

== Plot summary ==
The Human Instrumentality Project continues as mankind attempts to complete its existence. Shinji Ikari, the teenage pilot of Evangelion Unit-01 for the secretive military organization Nerv, contemplates his existence, believing he is unwanted. Through personal questions and conversations with Nerv operations director Misato Katsuragi, Asuka Langley Soryu, the pilot of Evangelion Unit-02, and Rei Ayanami, the pilot of Unit-00, Shinji questions how his identity is perceived by the people around him. He confronts his fear of rejection, loneliness, and low self-esteem, believing that being an Eva pilot is the only thing that gives him value, while they challenge his beliefs, saying that those flaws are shared by humanity. He hears imagined voices of his friends saying they hate him, though this exists within his perception of himself. Shinji's deceased mother, Yui Ikari, tells him that only he can find his own worth.

The setting transforms into an abstract void with Shinji and the other characters as pencil sketches, representing a world of perfect freedom, which is also perfect nothingness. Without boundaries or people, Shinji has difficulty defining himself and concludes that his identity is shaped by the perceptions of other people and his relationships with them. He is eventually shown a comedic, sitcom-esque world where the characters have ordinary lives; Shinji and Asuka are childhood best friends, Yui is alive and happily married to Gendo Ikari, Rei isn't a clone of Yui but is instead a bubbly transfer student, and Misato is a school teacher.

Upon seeing this, Shinji realizes that his life could've been different, and that this is not the only possible version of his existence. The other characters explain that people see things from their own perspective, including themselves, and they can change it easily by altering their perception. Shinji realizes that he can accept himself, declaring that he is worth living. The dark, constrictive world he is in shatters, and he reunites with the characters applauding him, saying, "Congratulations!" Shinji happily thanks them.

== Reception ==
Due to the controversially ambiguous nature of the episode, the audience reception was mixed. Some viewers found the episode to be a fitting conclusion to the series, while others felt that it was unsatisfying and confusing, which even led to death threats to the series creator Hideaki Anno. Spike Spencer, Shinji's voice actor in the ADV Films English dub of the series, was confused about the ending and improvised a comedic rant in-character as Shinji venting confusion about the ending during an outtake.

Some viewers praised the episode for its deep exploration of the main characters' inner struggles and the series' overarching themes of psychological trauma and religious symbolism.
