= Khara =

Khara may refer to:

== Places ==
- Khara, Iran, a village in Isfahan Province, Iran
- Khara-Khoto, the ruins of a medieval city in western Mongolia
- Khara, Pakistan, a town in Punjab, Pakistan
- Khara, Nepal, a village in Nepal
- Khara, Raebareli, a village in Uttar Pradesh, India

== People ==
- Khara (surname), a surname and clan in northern India, Pakistan, and Afghanistan
- Khara Jabola-Carolus, American feminist and government official

== Other uses ==
- Khara, a character in the Ramayana
- Khara (studio), an animation studio associated with Hideaki Anno
- Kharaa, a fictional disease in the video game Subnautica

== See also ==
- Khar (disambiguation)
- Khaira (disambiguation)
- Kara (disambiguation)
- Cara (disambiguation)
