= Kara Kara =

Kara Kara or Karakara may refer to:

- County of Kara Kara, Victoria, Australia
- Electoral district of Kara Kara, a former electoral district in Victoria, Australia
- Shire of Kara Kara, a former local government area in Victoria, Australia
- HMAS Kara Kara, a Royal Australian Navy vessel during the Second World War
- The Gayiri people of central Queensland, Australia (also called Kara Kara)
- K'ara K'ara, an Andean mountain
- Karakara, town in Niger
- Karakara (film), a 2012 film
- Karakara, a song from the album Kessoku Band
- Cubone (known as Karakara in Japan), a Pokémon

== See also ==
- Kara (disambiguation)
- Caracara (disambiguation)
