= Kar (suffix) =

Family name suffix of Western India

Kar (Marathi: कर Kar, Konkani: कार Kār) is a suffix used after the names of villages along the western coast of India, forming the most common surnames used by the Marathi and Konkani people in Maharashtra, Goa and some parts of Karnataka.

== Etymology ==
The suffix Kar comes from the Sanskrit Kāra, which means "making, doing, lord of", later modified to mean "hailing from" or "belonging to" in Prakrit-based languages.

== Usage ==
Such surnames are commonly used by communities of Konkani and Marathi ethnicities all over India. Most of them identify themselves with a place their ancestors hailed from, or sometimes with new places to which they have migrated. For example, if a person hails from the village of Borim in Goa, his surname would be Borkār; this custom is also followed by Konkani migrants to Karnataka. If a person hails from the town of Sirsi, the surname used would be Sirsekār.
