= SantosLab Carcará =

Carcará

General information
- Type: UAV
- Manufacturer: SantosLab
- Status: Active
- Primary user: Brazilian Navy

History
- First flight: 2009

The SantosLab Carcará is a Brazilian lightweight unmanned aerial vehicle designed to be transported by a single soldier. The soldier's height allows takeoff and landing in restricted areas where other aircraft are unable to operate. It is designed to be used in any theater, even if it is without roads or paths, or surrounded by obstacles.

It is designed for the Brazilian Marine Corps infantry in real-time reconnaissance.

== Characteristics ==
The Carcará was ordered by the Brazilian Navy to equip an infantry Marine Corps. The Navy wanted a UAV with stealth features that was lightweight, flexible, and resistant. The Carcará has a low acoustic signature, can be controlled by a single soldier, and can gather telemetry data. It can be programmed to follow a target automatically. To the naked eye, while in the air, it looks like a caracara.

== Specifications ==
- Wingspan: 160 cm
- Operating speed: 40 km / h
- Takeoff: manual or catapult
- Recovery: "deep stall"
- Autonomy: 60 to 95 minutes
- Payload: mobile camera with zoom, or Infra-red sensor
