= Khar Lake =

Khar Lake may refer to:

- Khar Lake (Khovd)
- Khar Lake (Zavkhan)
