= Khara, Pakistan =

Village in Punjab, Pakistan

Khara
- Village
- Location within Pakistan
- Coordinates: 30°56′56″N 73°44′36″E
- Country: Pakistan
- Province: Punjab
- District: [[]]
- Time zone: UTC+5 (PST)

Khara is a village located within the Neela Dullah in the Punjab region of Pakistan. It is part of Khara Tehsil and is located at 31°9'41N 74°25'28E with an altitude of 195 metres (643 feet).
