= Qar, Iran =

Qar قار
- Village
- Location within Iran
- Coordinates: 35°16′15″N 47°02′45″E
- Country: Iran
- Province: Kurdistan
- County: Sanandaj
- Bakhsh: Central
- Rural District: Howmeh

Population (2006)
  - Total: 805
- Time zone: UTC+3:30 (IRST)
  - Summer (DST): UTC+4:30 (IRDT)

Qar (Persian: قار, also Romanized as Qār; also known as Kār and Qāv) is a village in Howmeh Rural District, in the Central District of Sanandaj County, Kurdistan Province, Iran. At the 2006 census, its population was 805, in 190 families. The village is populated by Kurds.
