= Anime Explosion! =

Book of essays about anime

Anime Explosion! The What? Why? & Wow! Of Japanese Animation
- Cover of Anime Explosion! The What? Why? & Wow! Of Japanese Animation by Patrick Drazen.
- Author: Patrick Drazen
- Language: English
- Subject: Anime
- Genre: Non-fiction
- Publisher: Stone Bridge Press
- Publication date: January 1, 2002
- Publication place: United States
- Media type: Print (Paperback)
- Pages: 369 pp (first edition)
- ISBN: 978-1-880656-72-3

Anime Explosion! The What? Why? & Wow! Of Japanese Animation is a book of essays about anime written by Patrick Drazen. It was published on January 1, 2002, by Stone Bridge Press. The first half of the book defines "what anime is, what it is not, and more important, how it differs from American cartoons in general and TV-based American entertainment in particular". The second half looks into "individual films and directors". The book is used as a text in the "History and Art of Animation" course at Clarkson University, in the "Japanese Animation: Still Pictures, Moving Minds" course at Massachusetts Institute of Technology and in the "Animation: History and Criticism" course at Emory University.

== Reviews ==
Anime News Network's Mikhail Koulikov commends the book for being "packed with information" and having "valid points, and intelligent opinions". However, he criticizes the book for its "little overall cohesiveness; more a collection of articles in book form than a book". John F. Barber commends the book as a "timely and fascinating guide to the world of anime". Animefringe's Ridwan Khan criticizes the book for its "glaring omission" of anime history as "70s and 80s [anime] are either overlooked or mentioned in passing". Khan also criticises the book's cover for looking "too busy, too comic book, and too cheap pop". He commends Drazen for creating "a concrete basis in Japanese culture with just a dash of intellectual daring to explain anime in a fashion that makes the book extremely interesting".
