= Caracal (disambiguation) =

The caracal is a medium-sized wild cat.

Caracal may also refer to:

- Caracal (genus), a genus of cats comprising the caracal and the African golden cat
- Caracal (album), the 2015 album by Disclosure
- Caracal, Romania, a city in Olt County, Romania
- Caracal (river), a river in Dolj and Olt Counties, Romania
- Caracal Battalion, a unit of the Israel Defense Forces
- Plasan Sand Cat, also Caracal APC, an armored vehicle from Plasan Sasa
- Caracal pistol, a pistol made in the United Arab Emirates
- 2007.2 Caracal, a release of the operating system Pardus
- Military variant of the Eurocopter EC725 helicopter
- Caracal, a Caldari cruiser from the MMO Eve Online

== See also ==
- Karakul (disambiguation)
- Caracole, a turning maneuver on horseback
- Rooikat, an armoured fighting vehicle built in South Africa
- Caracalla, Roman emperor
- Caracol, Belizean archaelogical site
