= Kar nepalensis =

Scientific classification
- Domain: Eukaryota
- Kingdom: Animalia
- Phylum: Arthropoda
- Class: Insecta
- Order: Coleoptera
- Suborder: Adephaga
- Family: Carabidae
- Subfamily: Platyninae
- Tribe: Platynini
- Subtribe: Platynina
- Genus: Kar; Morvan, 1998
- Species: K. nepalensis

Binomial name
- Kar nepalensis Morvan, 1998

Genus of beetles

Kar nepalensis is a species of beetle in the family Carabidae, found in Nepal.
