= Weaving a Story 2: oral stage =

- Neon Genesis Evangelion episode
- Shinji's pilot suit expelled by Eva-01, resembling a spontaneous abortion.
- Episode no.: Episode 20
- Directed by: Masahiko Otsuka
- Written by: Hideaki Anno
- Original air date: February 14, 1996
- Running time: 22 minutes

Episode chronology
← Previous "Introjection"	Next → "He was aware that he was still a child"

"Weaving a Story 2: oral stage" (Note: Japanese: 心のかたち 人のかたち, Hepburn: Kokoro no katachi, hito no katachi; lit. 'Of the Shape of Hearts and Humans') is the twentieth episode of the Japanese anime television series Neon Genesis Evangelion, created by animation studio Gainax. Hideaki Anno wrote the episode and animator Masahiko Otsuka directed it. The series follows Shinji Ikari, a teenage boy whose father Gendo recruited him to the special military organization Nerv to pilot a gigantic biomechanical mecha called Evangelion against mysterious beings called Angels. In this episode, Eva-01 absorbs Shinji inside its cockpit. Trapped inside the mecha and without a physical body, Shinji reflects on his life and past battles while Nerv carries out a plan to rescue him.

The episode echoes the title and structure of the fourteenth episode of the series, reusing shots and situations from previous installments. The staff completed production in about a week, amid a schedule that had nearly collapsed. The story explores the themes of motherhood and masculinity, referring to scientific and psychological concepts; the title itself refers to Sigmund Freud's eponymous psychoanalytic concept.

"Weaving a Story 2: oral stage" premiered on February 14, 1996, drawing a 7.4% audience share on Japanese television. Reviewers gave the episode a mixed reception; the last scene, which depicts implied sex between the characters Misato Katsuragi and Ryoji Kaji, was criticized and became controversial upon airing on TV Tokyo. Some reviewers criticized the recycling of previously used animation and continuity errors, while others appreciated the use of previous footage, Anno's writing, the final scene, and the performance of Misato's voice actress, Kotono Mitsuishi.

== Plot ==
After the massive fight against Angel Zeruel, Shinji Ikari, pilot of the mecha Eva-01, becomes trapped inside its cockpit, losing his physical form and dissolving into it. Nerv devises a plan to recover Shinji. After a month, Nerv implements the recovery project, but Shinji refuses to return to reality; the pressure in the cockpit increases, rejecting its contents, including Shinji's pilot suit. Shinji's consciousness relives his life and the people he has known, such as Nerv Major Misato Katsuragi, and his fellow pilots Asuka Langley Soryu and Rei Ayanami, and reflects on his reasons for boarding the Eva. He also contemplates the nature of the series' enemies, known as the Angels, comparing them to his father, Gendo Ikari, with whom he has an adversarial and detached relationship. While floating naked in the sea of consciousness, Shinji feels the presence of his mother Yui, whose soul is kept inside Eva-01. Shinji decides to return to the real world and emerges from Unit 01's exposed core. After Shinji's recovery, Misato meets with her lover Ryoji Kaji; while they have sex in a bed, Kaji gives Misato a capsule, saying it may be his last gift to her.

== Production ==
Neon Genesis Evangelion director and main screenwriter Hideaki Anno wrote "Weaving a Story 2: oral stage", and worked with the series' assistant director Kazuya Tsurumaki on the storyboards.. Tsurumaki also served as the episode's chief animation director. This makes "Weaving a Story 2" one of the few episodes in the series written by Anno alone. Masahiko Otsuka directed the episode. Production involved other studios besides Gainax, including Studio Cockpit, Production I.G, and Tatsunoko Color Center. Production I.G previously worked on animation for the thirteenth episode, which included a microscopic Angel called Iruel, and "Ambivalence". The company also worked on computer-generated imagery (CGI) for The End of Evangelion (1997). According to the Red Cross Book, the official booklet on The End of Evangelion, the series makes extensive use of CGI, which was processed in a flat, two-dimensional manner like computer screens. At first, Production I.G. was supposed to produce the whole anime, and the company president, Mitsuhisa Ishikawa, was willing to do so; for various reasons, including Mamoru Oshii's apparent refusal, the original plans were changed, so Production I.G. only took care of "Weaving a Story 2: oral stage" and other individual episodes.

Gainax originally wanted the twentieth episode of the series to be titled "The Birth of Nerv". In the original scenario, Unit Eva-05 was to be shipped to Nerv from Germany. The same episode was to include a flashback to Gendo's story and an incident in which the Dead Sea evaporated fifteen years before the events of the series. Staff later changed their plans and conceived "Weaving A Story 2: oral stage", like the fourteenth installment "Weaving a Story", as a summary that is largely centered around the reuse of already existing material. During the planning stages, staff also considered the title "Shinji, the Birth" (シンジ、誕生, Shinji, tanjō) for the episode. The original script contains several differences from the version broadcast on TV. For example, Misato would have referred to only two berserk incidents involving Eva-01 instead of three, while Ritsuko would have explained that the Unit's core had "appeared" and that the Unit itself had begun to develop a will and an ego. Misato would also have reflected on humanity's desire to wield a tool endowed with divine power; furthermore, in her final scene with Kaji, she would have discussed the Angels' origin, saying: "I know the Angels aren't just weapons left behind by the First Indigenous Race" (使徒は第１先住民族の残したただの戦闘兵器ではない事は、わかっているわ).

Gainax used several frames from previous episodes of the series in the scenes focusing on Shinji's introspection; the staff added the scenes and made only minor changes, such as the backgrounds. Gainax also included a short sequence of a child Shinji inside the laboratory as foreshadowing of an event that occurs in the following episode. According to writer and movie critic Dennis Redmond, the introspective sequences create "a vibrant visual rhythm which matches the subtle techno loop of the soundtrack". Images of trains and newspaper headlines are visible, along with shots of a seashore and kanji characters in various fonts. Scholar Philip Brophy described the episode editing as a "synapse-shredding peak", as it reaches 75 images in 10 seconds and 85 images in 11 seconds. Writer River Seager noted Anno showed an interest in trains since his short film At the Bus Stop (1980) and Mobile Suit Gundam: Char's Counterattack (1988); the symbol of the train then returns in Anno's next work, Love & Pop (1998). Seager argued that trains have fused the themes of death and modernity in Japanese media since Kenji Miyazawa's novel Night on the Galactic Railroad, which was adapted into an anime film by Gisaburō Sugii and possibly influenced Galaxy Express 999. Trains thus became a site of isolation, loneliness, and the desire to run away; however, in Anno's cinematography, train stations also offer the hope for growth and change, as in the final scene of "Hedgehog's Dilemma".

In one of the scenes of Shinji's inner monologue, Eva-01's empty cockpit is shown with only Shinji's pilot suit floating inside. Japanese architect and academic Osamu Tsukihashi noted that, in the previous episode, "Introjection", Shinji is depicted aboard the Eva-01 in his school uniform instead. In the following scenes, Nerv's scientist Ritsuko Akagi claims Shinji, absorbed by the Eva-01, shows his image through his pilot suit, which represents his essence. The explanation was absent at the storyboard stage. According to Tsukihashi, Ritsuko's explanation is weak, but it may have been inserted by the episode staff to emphasize Shinji's physical absence. Tsukihashi traced the discontinuity between the two episodes to Evangelion production history; Anno said he did not follow a defined blueprint but chose fragmentary images that flashed through his mind and added them to the story as he worked, like "a live performance". Production also suffered from a lack of time due to the schedule. Gainax had completed only twelve episodes by the time the series began airing after nearly two years of production, leaving the staff to produce the remaining fourteen in just six months—roughly one-third of the time they had spent on the first twelve. Despite "Weaving a Story 2" being conceived as a recap episode, the production for the installment took about one week. According to chief animator Kazuya Tsurumaki, the schedule was a "disaster" at the time, with constant time pressures that prevented the staff from working quietly. He said that he felt exhausted at that time; despite this, especially from "Weaving a Story 2" onward, he experienced a pleasant sensation, and although he felt "dead tired", he experienced the feeling of using his natural abilities to their fullest potential.

As the episode's closing theme, the staff chose a version of Bart Howard's song "Fly Me to the Moon" entitled "B-22 A-Type", which was later replaced with a version of the same song called "B-4 piano" in later home-video editions of the series.

=== Final scene ===
The final scene, consisting only of close-ups and no explicit images, is an implied sex scene between Misato and Kaji and was designed for airing in a protected time slot. The sequence lasts almost two minutes, with partly cut close-ups of the characters' faces. According to academic José Andrés Santiago Iglesias, this peculiar interrelation of shots is reminiscent of panel transitions in manga, and "pillow-shots" in Japanese classic cinema, a term which was borrowed from Japanese poetry and was first coined by film theorist Noël Burch to refer to scenes composed of apparently random shots, depicting events that are secondary to the main action. Panel transitions are used to define the overall mood or a place in a given scene, and "rather than acting as a bridge between separate moments", the Evangelion viewer "must assemble a single moment using scattered fragments". Misato's words were left up to Kotono Mitsuishi, her voice actress; the script had only Anno's direction that said: "Mitsuishi, I look forward to working with you".

Because of the schedule, the staff concluded production of episodes just before the deadline, and TV Tokyo, the series' Japanese broadcaster, did not have enough time to check them. According to writer Alexandre Marine, these production delays allowed Anno to insert a risky sex scene. Toshimichi Ōtsuki, a representative of King Records and producer of the series, did not see the episode's final scene before the airing; he stated that if he had known in advance what Anno had done, he would have stopped it. After the first few episodes, Anno largely stopped involving Ōtsuki in the series' production; only after the controversy over the implied sex scene did he bring him back in to help manage the fallout. Staff members felt so tired due to the production schedule that they wanted to show a close-up of human genitalia, so the show would be canceled at some point. Anno said he had been "under pressure" because of TV restrictions. He defended the inclusion of Misato's sex scene, saying sex and violence are integral parts of human life, and that these scenes were necessary for the unraveling of the plot and "understanding life". According to Anno, such topics, which are usually kept away from children, should be shown in all their rawness, as a "poison" with which to immunize children and prepare them for real life. Writer Vrai Kaiser noted that Misato and Kaji's "loving, consensual" sex conversation obscures their bodies despite having previously shown more on screen, so "nudity is primarily a mark not of intimacy but of vulnerability, and the naked body is indeed actively disassociated from sex more often than not" in the series.

== Cultural references ==
Ritsuko and other characters in "Weaving a Story 2: oral stage" name the concept of the "ego boundary", a limit within which the ego recognizes its body as "self" and which if crossed leads to the dissolution of the body into a "quantum state", that is, a state in which the body is formed by quanta rather than atoms. In this case, the term ego refers to Sigmund Freud's psychic apparatus model, in which the ego mediates between the instinct of the id and the censure of the superego. Scholar Luka Perušić wrote, "ego nurtures our identity, protects our selfhood, and maintains our ability to communicate with others". Nerv's operators compare the composition of the liquid inside Eva-01's cockpit, in which Shinji is dissolved, to a "soup of life", the primordial soup from which terrestrial life is thought to have arisen. Evangelion Chronicle, an official encyclopedia about the series, and the book Evangelion Glossary (エヴァンゲリオン用語事典, Evangerion Yougo Jiten), edited by Yahata Shoten, likened this detail to the RNA world theory and the theory of chemical evolution, according to which organic substances formed from inorganic substances in the oceans; this term is later used for the LCL sea in the movie The End of Evangelion (1997). Other scientific or psychological terms are named during the episode; including apoptosis, Hayflick's limit, the trigonometric concept of tangent, addiction, alienation, and compensation.

During Shinji's retrieval operation, a Nerv's operator says the boy's "ego boundary results in being fixed in an indefinite loop", and Ritsuko claims the emitted signals remain imprisoned in "Klein's space", referring to the Klein bottle, a three-dimensional version of the Möbius strip. Shinji's monologue also mentions internalization, a process through which the superego is formed; repression, identification, and symbiosis, a form of mutual dependence between two living beings. Other psychological terms appear on Nerv's monitors; on a graph called Psychic Essence Threshold Signal, the negative axes are labeled destrudo, while the positive axes are named libido. They refer to the two concepts in Edoardo Weiss's psychoanalysis of the same name, also known as Eros and Thanatos; they denote the life and expansion drive, and the death and retraction drive, respectively. During the rescue operation, there is a death or destrudo reaction, and the term cathexis is named, which in Freudian psychology indicates libidinal investment toward an object. In the process, Shinji hears his mother Yui saying, "Anywhere can be heaven if you have the desire to live", which writer Dennis Redmond interpreted as a reference to Akira Kurosawa's 1956 movie Ikiru.

== Themes ==
"Weaving a Story 2: oral stage" represents a turning point in Neon Genesis Evangelion; from this point, the series relies more on the mysteries and emotional bonds of the characters than on action elements. Protoculture Addicts magazine also noted "the story is really picking up speed" in this story arc. According to Hideaki Anno, the third and last arc of the anime begins with the episode, so the story becomes more "abstract". Shinji, absorbed by Eva-01 after the previous episode's battle, finds himself in his inner world, and questions his life and his reasons for piloting the Evangelion 01, concluding he boards the Eva to gain the approval of others. According to scholar Sano Yasuyuki, "Weaving a Story 2" represents a "turning point" in Shinji's journey. He finds himself in a closed, cozy world where he seeks the innermost aspirations, and dreams of his ego's desires. Searching tentatively for the meaning of his existence, it becomes clear that he desires affection and care from the people around him. He remembers past battles and ponders the meaning of war. In his spiritual world, Shinji also remembers that he had already met Eva-01 before he arrived at Nerv, fleeing from his parents. According to an official booklet about the series, Shinji ran away from that site, and that incident planted a "compulsive idea" in him that he must not "run away". Academic Giuseppe Gatti noted the theme of "postbiotic" fusion is linked to "forms of narrative diradiation and confusion" that intensify as the relationship between Shinji and the Eva-01 becomes more complex, and the boundary "between reality and virtuality, intention and action, me-ness and we-ness becomes indistinguishable".

Yūichirō Oguro, the editor of supplemental materials included in the Japanese edition of the series, noted that the episode deals with the theme of masculinity. Writer Claudio Cordella also noted motherhood symbolism, with Evas representing a mother, the LCL resembling the amniotic fluid, and the Entry Plug a womb. As in the battle against Angel Leliel in "Splitting of the Breast", Shinji declares himself to be a man in "Introjection", but he is punished by his mother and trapped inside Eva-01's womb-like cockpit. According to the Japanese academic Mari Kotani, winning the fight against Angel Zeruel in "Introjection", "the hero is also incorporated into the cyborg feminized matrix" of Evangelion-01; according to Mari, this reflects the fact that Shinji becomes increasingly feminized during Evangelion. According to scholar Cristopher Smith, Shinji confronts the fact that other people treat him kindly only because he performs machista masculine violence; performing violence for society is a requirement for being cared for by others or even allowed to exist. Smith said, "men with queer masculinities that cannot perform hegemonic masculine violence have no place in society, and therefore no right to exist" in the world of Evangelion. In the same dream, Misato tells Shinji his current personhood exists because he piloted the Eva and performed violence. She also tells Shinji he must choose his actions from now on, that there is a choice, and, according to Smith, "he can let hegemonic violent masculinity define him, or he can choose something else".

Shinji confronting his father Gendo during his monologue

During Shinji's monologue, a young Rei talks to Shinji as he escapes from reality; an image of Shinji and his father standing in his way is also visible. Shinji then links the image of the enemy—the Angels—to his father Gendo. Academic Susan Joliffe Napier, noting the Angels are explicitly associated with Gendo, described the Angels themselves as father figures. According to Dennis Redmond, Rei takes on the role of Shinji's internalized conscience in the process; "the arbiter of a complex set of Oedipal conflicts and psychological ambivalences". For writer Álvaro Arbonés, following an Oedipal logic, Shinji wants to be recognized by Gendo and kill him at the same time. Arbonés also noted that Misato represents another Oedipal "maternal figure". During the last dream sequence, there is a rewriting of Shinji's farewell to Misato at the train station before Zeruel's attack in "Introjection". Misato tells Shinji that only he can decide his future. Redmond said Shinji finally grasps what Misato really said in the previous episode: "that she would always care about him, regardless of whether he was a pilot or not". Meanwhile, in the real world, Ritsuko talks about a failed recovery plan that happened ten years before, foreshadowing Yui's contact experiment with Eva-01 seen later in the series. According to Yoshihiro Tanigawa, the episode also suggests that Seele, Gendo, and Fuyutsuki's true desire is "the dissolution of the ego's boundaries".

Scholar Yoshihiro Tanigawa compared Shinji's visions to the oceanic feeling, a sensation of eternity and being one with the external world as a whole discussed by Sigmund Freud and Romain Rolland. In another part of his monologue, Shinji sees Misato, Rei, and Asuka proposing to "become one" with him. According to Redmond, the scene quotes erotic hentai manga. Misato's role is that of the motherly provider, while Rei addresses Shinji by his last name, Ikari, a formal reference to family ties. Only Asuka is genuinely seductive, airily tossing her hair, flashing her eyes, and urging Shinji to do something instead of bemoaning his fate. Animage magazine described this proposal as a possible solution to Arthur Schopenhauer's hedgehog's dilemma, mentioned in the first episodes. According to Mechademia writer Mariana Ortega: "melding with Misato, Rei and Asuka, Shinji ceases to be who he is, and they cease to be themselves, becoming part of an asexual, impersonal, and immaterial bliss that exists outside time and space". Ortega argued this represents Shinji's encounter with a sort of "eternal feminine" that is traced back to the mother "not as an individual but as a state of being". This event also represents a "portrayal of sexual anxiety"; an equivalent myth can be found in the Jewish character Lilith, a "killer of children and oneiric temptress". Ortega noted this also prefigures the Instrumentality seen in The End of Evangelion. According to scholar Alba G. Torrents, the desire to be one with "the Other" is clear in the scene. Writers Bounthavy Suvilay and Shoko Fukuya similarly noted that the scene is reprised in the last episode of the series and the scenario of Shinji dissolved into Eva-01 resembles the Instrumentality shown in the finale. According to Anno, the scene with Misato, Rei, and Asuka represents Shinji's mother's voice asking Shinji if he wants to become one with her, but his mother returns Shinji to Misato in the end.

=== Motherhood and criticism of otaku ===
The episode's title "Weaving a Story 2: oral stage" refers to Freud's eponymous psychoanalytic concept; in Freudian theory, the oral stage is the first stage of a child's psychosexual development, in which pleasure is mainly gained from sucking on the mother's breast, and the main erogenous zone is the mouth. In the opening scenes, during Nerv's preparation for Shinji's rescue, there is a close-up of Misato's mouth as she argues with Ritsuko, a foreshadowing of the theme. Shinji asks for kindness from others, showing he has a passive, dependent personality; he thus regresses to the oral phase, a period in which the Self and the Others are undifferentiated. In the final scenes, Ritsuko and Misato hear a radio program in which a speaker talks about a reader's companion, explicitly naming the oral phase. In this case, the term refers to the concept of fixation or oral personality, which according to Freud is exhibited by individuals who were inadequately nurtured during childhood and who therefore desire attention, seeing others solely as objects for their pleasure, just like Shinji does. According to writer Alexandre Marine, Misato also has an oral personality, as she finds comfort in physical pleasure. Hideaki Anno stated in an interview that he felt like Shinji because he acts like a "melancholic oral-dependent type". Anno also reused the Freudian theory of the oral phase in the last episode of the series, in which Shinji sees both the good side and the bad, hidden side of other people, like the child who realizes in the oral phase that his mother is not split into "good mother" and "bad mother", understanding that positive and negative aspects can coexist in a single individual instead.

During Shinji's inner monologue, an image of him as an infant being breastfed appears. According to animator Yūichirō Oguro, this means that Shinji returns to his mother's breast, resolving his oral-stage fixation.

According to writer Álvaro Arbonés, the episode title reinforces the idea that everything that happens in the installment is related to sexuality; Arbonés also noted Freud linked sexuality with cannibalism. In his monologue, Shinji sees the image of his mother breastfeeding him as a child; Shinji himself curls up in a fetal position, another reference to the oral stage. The image of Shinji being breastfed by his mother has led Ortega to describe Yui as a "benign Madonna", more balanced than the other mothers in the series, Naoko Akagi and Kyoko Zeppelin Soryu. Unlike Naoko and Kyoko, who died by suicide, characterized and killed by their "woman" aspect in fits of jealousy and guilt, Yui simply disappeared into Eva-01 and became "all-mother". According to Ortega, "unlike the vampiric Naoko and Kyoko, Yui/Eva01/Rei/Lilith ultimately acts as the force of development and engenderment". Yui acts as protector and savior against the demiurgic Gendo, who plays the role of a "paternal tyrant". For Ortega, Yui's nature becomes the final sacrifice that allows "the 'new genesis' promised in the title to come into being". Anime Feminist website writers also associated the episode's themes with Jacques Lacan's psychoanalytic theory, which described the mother as the child's first Other.

According to the writer Virginie Nebbia, the challenge of Shinji and other characters in the series is to succeed in leaving the mother figure, to whom the characters return thanks to the Evangelion units, to free themselves from their addictions, and attempt to live an adult and responsible life. According to Nebbia, the series however does not make "an idyllic and unclouded portrait of mothers facing contemptuous fathers". The benevolent mother figure stands alongside the overprotective mother, also symbolizing the "fear of women" by obsessive anime fans, known as otaku in Japanese. For scholar Andrew M. Winters, Shinji recognizes that human beings decide their future, and that through transformation "we become independent and not defined by our parents". According to manga author Kentaro Takekuma, "Weaving a Story 2" also makes extensive use of the symbolism of returning to the womb, childbirth and conception, something he considered rare in anime. Takekuma argued that the episode's Yui represents the very concept of motherhood rather than Shinji's literal mother, or an existence that lies beyond logic, a woman as perceived from a man's perspective; by contrast, the father figure represses the son through comprehensible logic and overt violence—an explicit, recognizable form of authority—whereas the mother envelops the child with benevolence.

During the rescue operation, Shinji seems to refuse to come back to reality, and his pilot suit is forcibly ejected from the cockpit; the image is reminiscent of that of a miscarriage. Shinji also remembers his mother's smell, and he sees a flickering light in front of him while swimming in a sea of amniotic fluid. The light resembles an image of the outside world as seen through the eyes of a baby in the womb and the religious concept of the soul, which Nerv treats as a concrete entity. According to Oguro, the image of the mother's breast can be interpreted as a metaphor for Shinji going back in time, drinking his mother's milk, and resolving his fixation. Regressing to the oral stage allows Shinji to re-establish a trusting relationship with his mother, and thus to resolve his oral personality. He then hears a conversation between Gendo and Yui before his birth saying that if they had a boy they would have called him Shinji, while if they had a girl they would have called her Rei; Yui repeats "Shinji ... Rei". According to the official encyclopedia Evangelion Chronicle, the scene is key to the relationship between the two characters. According to the academic Taro Igarashi, this can be linked to the high compatibility Shinji shows with Rei in the series. Writer and researcher Fabio Bartoli connected Yui's phrase "Shinji ... Rei" to the shinjinrui (新人類; lit. "new human race"), the young people who grew up in the 1970s who were perceived to be different from earlier generations; he thus described Evangelion as a gospel directed to the shinjinrui. During the process, Shinji also hears his mother Yui saying: "Anywhere can be heaven if you have the desire to live". Writer and academic Mariana Ortega noted Yui repeats the same words in the finale of The End of Evangelion. The scene marks the boy's rebirth as a human being. Shinji chooses to return to the real world and, touched by his mother's feelings, appears naked before Unit 01's lit-up core; the Evangelion Glossary and The New Yorker noted this image also resembles a childbirth. Yui also says that only those who live can achieve happiness; Luka Perušić compared this to Søren Kierkegaard's philosophy, according to which human beings are crucified between the finite and the infinite, and "in the uncertain possibility lies the potency for freedom".

== Reception ==
"Weaving a Story 2: oral stage" was first broadcast on 14 February, 1996, and drew a 7.4% audience share on Japanese television. In 1996, with 93 votes, it ranked eighteenth among the best anime episodes of the Anime Grand Prix, a large, annual poll made by Animage magazine. In July 2020, Comic Book Resources reported a rating of 8.6/10 for the installment on IMDb, making it the seventh-highest-rated Evangelion episode. Gainax also released official merchandise based on the episode, including a line of official T-shirts.

The episode received a mixed reception from anime critics. The Anime Café's Akio Nagatomi criticized "Weaving a Story 2: oral stage"; while appreciating the introspective exploration of the human ego and "some fine acting" by "a most distraught" Kotono Mitsuishi in the ending scene, Nagatomi said the way Shinji is recovered with a deus ex machina destroys the effect because the "writer buried the plot so deeply, there was no means to extricate it". He also criticized the continuity error in which Shinji's suit is shown instead of his school uniform, and the use of long-dialog pieces, single-scene shots, and flashbacks. Film School Rejects' Max Covill ranked the episode among the worst of Neon Genesis Evangelion, criticizing the use of flashbacks to fill in the run time and writing. According to Covill: "Shinji does eventually come back to the physical world, but the lack of animation is painful in this episode". Despite his criticism of the recap of previous episodes, Covill praised the shot in which Shinji's suit is expelled from Eva-01's cockpit, citing it as among the "perfect shots of Neon Genesis Evangelion.

During its first airing, the episode proved controversial. According to Nikkei Business Publications and writers Kazuhisa Fujie and Martin Foster, the closing sex scene between Kaji and Misato, while it contains no explicit images, was criticized as being "inappropriate" for an anime show that is viewed by children. Anime News Network writer Brian Stremick similarly reported that the implicit sex scene shocked many fans and caused "plenty of consternation"; Japanese anime fans posted on the internet "that the show shouldn't be broadcasting that kind of material in the early evening, but late at night". GameFan, on the other hand, described the sex scene as "tastefully-done". Dennis Redmond praised two shots of Eva-01 swathed in white bandages, describing them as "extraordinary". Digitally Obsessed's Joel Cunningham gave a positive review of "Weaving a Story 2: oral stage", saying it cannot be missed and praising its "great ending". According to Cunningham: "This episode is also a series highlight, once again exhibiting how much can be done with simple animation and suggestion/repetition". Yahoo! website wrote, "Comparable to The Sopranos' dream episodes and the weirdest parts of Twin Peaks, this episode infuses the sensibility of art cinema into a TV serial to incredible captivating results". Analysing the episode, Japanese academic Osamu Tsukihashi noted that Anno's script leads the viewer to connect and join together seemingly disconnected parts; Anno's work does not represent a coherent overall picture, and the viewer needs to create a coherent picture of the work as a whole. According to Tsukihashi, the incoherence of the episode enhances the work.
