= Weaving a Story =

- Neon Genesis Evangelion episode
- An image of Rei Ayanami's inner monologue. Several images of the girl put in a row appear during Rei's stream of thoughts, described by critic Dennis Redmond as reminiscent of 1970s science fiction.
- Episode no.: Episode 14
- Directed by: Masahiko Otsuka, Ken Ando
- Written by: Hideaki Anno
- Original air date: January 3, 1996
- Running time: 22 minutes

Episode chronology
← Previous "Lilliputian Hitcher"	Next → "Those women longed for the touch of others' lips, and thus invited their kisses"

"Weaving a Story" (Note: Japanese: ゼーレ、魂の座, Hepburn: Zere, tamashii no za; lit. 'Seele, the seat of the soul') is the fourteenth episode of the Japanese anime television series Neon Genesis Evangelion, which was created by Gainax. The episode, written by Hideaki Anno, and directed by Masahiko Otsuka and Ken Ando, was first broadcast on TV Tokyo on January 3, 1996. The series is set fifteen years after a worldwide cataclysm known as Second Impact and is mostly set in the futuristic, fortified city of Tokyo-3. The series' protagonist is Shinji Ikari, a teenage boy recruited by his father Gendo to the special military organization Nerv to pilot a gigantic, biomechanical mecha named Evangelion into combat against beings called the Angels. In the course of the episode, a secret sect named Seele examines Gendo Ikari's actions to determine whether his actions are in accordance with the organisation's plans, which follow ancient documents called the Dead Sea Scrolls. Evangelion's pilots are tested; during her test, Rei Ayanami has a long stream of consciousness in which she investigates her identity.

During the making of the series, director Anno felt he had neglected Rei's character, so he tried to devote space to her by writing an inner monologue by depicting her as a girl with schizophrenia. A friend of his had lent him a volume on mental illness with a poem written by a nervous sufferer. Anno wrote Rei's monologue taking inspiration from the book's poem by inserting more and more psychological introspection in the episodes to follow.

"Weaving a Story" drew a 0.9% audience share on Japanese television. The first part of the episode, a summary of the previous thirteen, was deemed both useful and superfluous by reviewers. In contrast, Rei's inner monologue attracted positive comments.

== Plot ==
The first half of this episode is a clip show, in the form of a report by the secret organization Seele reviewing the actions of Gendo Ikari, commander of the special agency Nerv, summarizing the first season of episodes and the story up until this point. In the second half, Nerv's scientist Ritsuko Akagi conducts an experiment to determine if pilots can be switched between the Evangelion mechas they normally pilot. Pilot Rei Ayanami can synchronize with Unit-01 fairly well, but when Shinji Ikari attempts to synchronize with Unit-00, it goes violently out of control inside the base. Unit-00 attacks the hangar's observation booth, smashing the window. However, Rei was standing at the window instead of Gendo, causing Major Misato Katsuragi to wonder if Unit-00 was trying to kill Rei. Meanwhile, Ritsuko feels that Unit-00 was trying to attack her. At the end of the episode, Rei uses Unit-00 to bring a giant weapon named Spear of Longinus recovered from Antarctica to the deepest level of Nerv's base, the Terminal Dogma.

== Production ==
In 1993, Gainax wrote a presentation document for Neon Genesis Evangelion entitled New Century Evangelion (tentative name) Proposal (新世紀エヴァンゲリオン (仮) 企画書, Shinseiki Evangelion (kari) kikakusho) to find potential sponsors for the series, containing the initial synopsis for the planned episodes. The Proposal document was then published in 1994. For the first twelve episodes aired, the company roughly followed the schedule envisioned by the first draft, with only a few minor script differences. From the thirteenth episode onward, however, the production deviated from the original plan of the writers and from what was initially envisioned in the submission document. The fourteenth episode of the series was to be titled "The Sickness Unto Death, and" (死に至る病、そして, Shi ni itaru yamai, soshite), and not "Weaving a Story"; during the installment, the second of a trilogy of episodes with the same basic theme, Shinji would learn "true fear and despair". The staff in progress abandoned the original project, and some of the ideas for the trilogy were later transferred and condensed into the sixteenth episode, "Splitting of the Breast". According to Michael House, translator for Gainax at the time, Neon Genesis Evangelion's main director Hideaki Anno initially intended to give the whole story of the anime a happy ending, but he realized that he had created characters that were too problematic during production, so he changed his plans. According to Hiroki Azuma, a culture critic who personally interviewed the director, Anno also began to criticize obsessive anime fans, known as otaku in Japanese, whom he considered too close-minded and introverted, so he changed his original plans during the first broadcast by creating a more dramatic and introspective story toward the middle of the series. Beginning with "Lilliputian Hitcher", the production also ran into severe scheduling problems because of delays in episode delivery. Gainax had completed only twelve episodes by the time the series began airing after nearly two years of production, leaving the staff to produce the remaining fourteen in just six months—roughly one-third of the time they had spent on the first twelve.

Hideaki Anno wrote the screenplay and produced the storyboards. "Weaving a Story" was one of the three episodes of the series that Anno wrote all by himself. Masahiko Otsuka and Ken Ando acted as directors. Kazuya Tsurumaki and Masayuki, the two assistant directors of the series, worked on the main designs together with Hisaki Furukawa, Shohei Sotoyama, and Yasuhiro Kamikura. Production involved other studios besides Gainax, such as Cosmos, Studio Bihou, and Maki Productions. Anno worked on "Weaving a Story" at the same time as the production of the sixteenth episode. During the making of the series, he felt particularly conflicted about the character of Rei Ayanami. Anno tried to bring a hidden side of his psyche into the character, portraying her as a representation of his unconscious. In spite of this, he felt uneasy, because he did not really feel interested in or akin to Rei. During the course of the episodes, he devoted very little space to the character, almost forgetting about her existence; he thus decided halfway through the series to devote more space to Rei inserting her inner monologue. Initially, the director thought of portraying Rei as a girl suffering from schizophrenia, and tried to "talk about himself". Despite his attempts, however, he could not write the monologue, so he began to read about psychology to find the words to express himself. To help him, a friend of his lent him a volume from a series of magazine-like books called Bessatsu Takarajima (別冊宝島) on mental illness, inside which was a poem written by a mentally ill person. The poem deeply affected Anno, and he was finally able to write the monologue in one go. From then on, the concept of the series veered in an introspective direction, in an attempt to describe how the human mind works.

In the episode's original script, Ritsuko hypothesized that Eva-00 was rejecting Shinji, or conversely that Shinji was rejecting the Eva. During production, animator Mitsuo Iso proposed making Rei a girl destined to die at her first menstruation. The story for the Dummy System, a piloting system based on Rei's pseudo-personality first mentioned in "Weaving a Story", was not written by Iso, but was already present in "Angel Invasion," which he wrote, although he was not involved in the writing of the subsequent installments. Most of the episode consists of a summary of the previous thirteen installments, with the use of numerous captions written in Matisse Mincho font and in bold type. Writers Álvaro Arbonés and David Bordonaba-Plou noted that a summary episode for an anime was usual at the time. The entire first part is devoid of background music; the staff also kept character lines to a minimum. The second part, on the other hand, while presenting unedited sequences and continuing the plot, consists of images constructed using photographic material collected from previous episodes. The number of new frames was reduced to only five hundred. Whilst normally for summary episodes duplicate films of the scenes already filmed are used, Neon Genesis Evangelion staff decided to re-photograph the component drawings for "Weaving a Story" instead. For the scene of Sachiel's attack, the crew intentionally deleted the flying VTOL vehicles present in the original installment. The staff also added old sequences with different colouring, such as the scene where Eva-00 goes berserk. Takashi Nagasako, Junko Iwao, Takehito Koyasu, Katsumi Suzuki, Miki Nagasawa, Tetsuya Iwanaga, and Kotono Mitsuishi played unidentified characters audible in the background of the scenes of "Weaving a Story". The voice acting of scenes from previous episodes was also redone. The scene where Asuka and Shinji scream while kicking the Angel Israfel, for example, is covered by the soundtrack in the original episode, while for "Weaving a Story", Asuka and Shinji's voice actresses, Yūko Miyamura and Megumi Ogata, had to play the scream scene that was originally left silent several times. Yōko Takahashi, who had already sung the opening theme song, also sang a version of "Fly Me to the Moon" which was later used as the episode's closing theme song, later replaced in later editions of the series by a version called "Rei solo/Normal".

== Cultural references and themes ==
According to Kazuya Tsurumaki, assistant director of the series, Anno may have taken inspiration from the 45th episode of Mobile Suit Victory Gundam, "Uso Dances in Hallucination", to compose "Weaving a Story"; like the Gundam episode, "Weaving a Story" is a summary episode that is not really one, telling something new instead. Evangelion Chronicle magazine compared the heavy use of captions in the first part of "Weaving a Story" to the films of director Kon Ichikawa, and the Furuhata Ninzaburo series. The Japanese title of the episode has been translated in the English edition as "Seele, the throne of the soul". Carl Gustav Horn, editor of the North American edition of the manga, linked the "throne of the soul" to the Jewish Kabbalah, describing it as "a very Sephirothic concept". Critic Mario Pasqualini noted how the character za (座) could also be translated as "theater", linking the title translation "Theatre of the Soul" to the last episodes of the series, in which the characters of the series undergo therapy in a metaphysical theater.

"Weaving a Story" contains the first explicit mention in the anime of the Dead Sea Scrolls, a series of secret documents in Seele's possession. The name refers to the real Dead Sea Scrolls, discovered in a cave on the northwest coast of the Dead Sea region in Palestine in 1947. It was rumoured that parts of these ancient manuscripts were hidden by the Vatican because of inconvenient material that could shake the foundations of the Christian religion. Hideaki Anno incorporated the Dead Sea Scrolls into the script because he found the idea that their undisclosed contents might undermine Christianity particularly compelling. According to Anno, the Old and New Testaments contain inconsistencies and distortions, including the account of Adam's creation; he argued that the Genesis narrative had been reshaped to promote a patriarchal worldview, since Eve, as the woman, should have been created first. According to the character designer of the series, Yoshiyuki Sadamoto, the post-apocalyptic scenario and the use of the Dead Sea scrolls in Neon Genesis Evangelion are a "side effect" of Nadia: The Secret of Blue Water, a previous work by Gainax and Anno. Igarashi compared the function of Evangelion Dead Sea Scrolls to Gabriel García Márquez's One Hundred Years of Solitude, in which events are discovered already written in Sanskrit on the scrolls of Melquíades. Rei also mentions the "Red Earth" in her monologue, a reference to some theories about the etymology of the name Adam, according to which it means "earth" or "red".

Neurology terms are mentioned in the compatibility test scene, such as the optic nerve, autonomic neurons, the two brain hemispheres, vertebrae, synapses, corpus callosum, spinal cord, cerebrum, tactile neurons, and sensory neurons. In the final scene of the episode, the spear of Longinus is mentioned for the first time, and is transported by Rei with her Eva-00 in the deepest section of Nerv's headquarters. The spear is named after the legendary Roman soldier who used his spear to pierce Jesus Christ when he was crucified on Golgotha; legend has it that whoever wields this spear impregnated with Christ's blood will control the world. Writer Patrick Drazen has compared Longinus' spear from the series to Amenonuhoko (天沼矛), the spear of the two creator kamis Izanagi and Izanami. Furthermore, "Weaving a Story" presents for the first time the real names of the Angels who appeared in the previous episodes. Their names all refer to real angels from the apocryphal Judeo-Christian manuscripts; the characteristics of each Angel are also linked to them, forming a complex web of symbolism. ScholarGavin McDowell noted that many Evangelion Angels have names of angels from the Book of Enoch; since Aramaic copies of 1 Enoch were found among the real Dead Sea Scrolls, McDowell speculated that Enoch's record of angelic hostility to humanity inspired the scenario outlined in Evangelion's fictional Dead Sea Scrolls. McDowell, noting that Seele is a German word for "soul", also saw a fascination for Germany in Evangelion. The official Evangelion Chronicle encyclopedia stated that Seele probably rose in Europe and hid itself to avoid being accused of being heretical. According to Evangelion Chronicle, after finding documents written in a script never used by any known human civilization, Seele deciphered the documents and verified its contents, "finding several ruins and collecting precious artifacts".

== Themes and style ==
The deformed face of Rei Ayanami which Shinji sees while on Eva-00. This led fans to speculate that Eva-00 has the soul of the first Ayanami clone.

Japanese writer Shoko Fukuya has noted how the memories and previous events of the series are remixed in "Weaving a Story" through captions and stories of people connected to the Evangelions, similar to a news report; whereas before Neon Genesis Evangelion was a simple private story of Evangelion pilot boys, it is reinterpreted as a scenario planned by Seele. This reportage, according to Fukuya, is unreal, and would show how Evangelion is indeed a descendant of monster-of-the-weeks shows like the tokusatsu series Ultraman, but at the same time different from them. The reportage also features the voice of Hikari Horaki, who claims that she is used to evacuation trials. As noted by academic Taro Igarashi, the experience of war is depicted as an extension of the young boys' daily lives. Scholar Bounthavy Suvilay also noted that Evangelion focuses on the main characters' psychology from "Weaving a Story" onward.

In the test compatibility scene, Shinji, having climbed onto the Eva-00, notices that he can feel Ayanami's smell. The book Evangelion Glossary (エヴァンゲリオン用語事典, Evangerion Yougo Jiten) by Yahata Shoten noted that the sense of smell is related to memory and sexual arousal, since a quarter of people with anosmia do not experience desire. Asuka reacts by asking whether Shinji is a pervert; the episode's original script explicitly instructed that she deliver the line in a jealous tone. Shinji glimpses a distorted image of Rei for a moment. This has led to discussions among fans and to speculation that Eva-00 contains the soul of the first clone of Rei, or Naoko Akagi. Furthermore, a cut from the Eva-00 activation test shows Ritsuko, Naoko's daughter, with dark hair; according to Comic Book Resources writer Hannah Alton, "it seems likely that Rei I's soul is mistaking Ritsuko for Naoko". Architect Kaichiro Morikawa likened Rei's deformed face which Shinji sees to the artistic installations of Tony Oursler. Shoko Fukuya compared the exchange of memories between Shinji and Rei to the Instrumentality visible in the last episodes of the series, a process in which the human souls merge into one entity. Academic scholar Mariana Ortega also noted how Asuka compares Eva-01 to the maternal breast and womb during the same scene, another theme presented in the following episodes.

The episode is the first to paint the inner world of a character, Rei, offering a long poetic monologue marked by a series of seemingly disconnected images and memories. Mechademia academic magazine noted how it is labeled "Rei's poem" by fans for its "fragmentary, cryptic nature". The fundamental theme of the second half of the series thus becomes that of the representation of the characters' psyche and the investigation of the "human heart", reaching its climax in the finale. Rei asks "Who am I?" and "Who are you?" in the course of her monologue; several identical images of the girl arranged in a row also appear in the scene. Writer Dennis Redmond linked Ayanami's questions to "Who is No.1?", the refrain from The Prisoner, and to the key line "Who am I?" from Heiner Müller's Germania Death in Berlin. According to Redmond, Rei's multiple images are reminiscent of the clones and androids endemic to 1970s science fiction, while the images appearing during Rei's poem "suggest a spectrum from classic East Asian mythology", such as the creation of Monkey King in Journey to the West from the union of Heaven and Earth, referred to by Rei as "sky" and "mountains". Rei also says she doesn't like the red colour in the monologue; Anime Feminist writers linked this passage with Rei's dislike of Asuka.

Writer Yuya Sato compared Rei's inner monologue to those in girls' manga, known as shōjo. For example, Sakumi Yoshino's manga Eccentrics presents questions about personal identity and moments of introspection similar to Rei's "Who am I?" question. As in shōjo manga, there is no need for a clear answer to the question in Rei's monologue; its purpose for Sato is only to ask questions. Ayanami's stream of consciousness does not move the story forward, and Rei lets out what she feels in a chaotic way, instead expressing her dislikes and sympathies; this world of dislikes and sympathies also constitutes another thematically popular aspect in shōjo manga. Director Anno himself stated that he read romance novels written by female authors while writing the characters of Evangelion and that shōjo manga had influenced him since his youth. He often preferred them to shōnen manga, which target a predominantly male audience. Among the authors he cited as formative influences were Fusako Kuramochi, Shinji Wada, Mariko Iwadate, and Yumiko Ōshima. According to scholar Jonas Faria Costa, Rei feels alienated from herself in the episode, similar to the characters of Italian writer Luigi Pirandello. Academic Alba G. Torrents made a similar observation, saying that from "Weaving a Story" a side of Rei emerges in which she is an "Other not only to other people, but also to herself". Writer Gabriel F. Y. Tsang noted that in Rei's monologue there is no God who has granted humans a purpose to survive, so "her enquiry about the nature of Self points to nothing". Rei also describes herself as a "girl who doesn't bleed"; according to the official filmbooks on the series, this could mean that the girl does not have a menstrual cycle.

== Reception ==
"Weaving a Story" was first broadcast on January 3, 1996, at 8:00 AM, an unusual time for Neon Genesis Evangelion due to a New Year's rescheduling, and thus drew a 0.9% audience share on Japanese television, the lowest in the entire series. Merchandise on the episode has been released. A virtual reality game named Neon Genesis Evangelion VR: The Throne of Souls has been developed by Khara and Bandai Namco Entertainment; the same companies released an upgraded version of the attraction entitled Evangelion VR The Throne of Souls: Runaway (エヴァンゲリオンVR The 魂の座：暴走, Evuangerion VR The tamashī no za: Bōsō) in 2017.

The Anime Café's Akio Nagatomi positively received the episode. The summary of the previous installments is in his opinion useful; Nagatomi also found Rei's soliloquy "fascinating", concluding his review by saying, "Not an exciting episode, but very important in its content". According to Protoculture Addicts magazine, despite the first half is a summary it still "should be viewed carefully". Film School Rejects' Max Covill, on the other hand, commented negatively on "Weaving a Story", placing it second to last in his ranking of the Neon Genesis Evangelion episodes and criticizing the heavy recycling of already used animations. Yahoo! Entertainment wrote, "Viewers tuning in weekly might have appreciated this at the time, but nobody wants to watch this in the streaming age". For Digitally Obsessed's Joel Cunningham the episode does a good job of "answering some questions without really answering anything", but he described it as weaker than the twelfth and the thirteenth for the long summary. Cunningham still praised the ending, "a real shocker that left me, upon first viewing, racing to the store to purchase the next video". Writer Dennis Redmond described Rei's monologue as an "astonishingly beautiful dream sequence".

== See also ==
- "Weaving a Story 2: oral stage"
