= Those women longed for the touch of others' lips, and thus invited their kisses =

- Neon Genesis Evangelion episode
- Misato and Kaji kiss. Critic Akio Nagatomi criticized the scene as "overdone".
- Episode no.: Episode 15
- Directed by: Naoyasu Habu
- Written by: Hideaki Anno; Akio Satsukawa
- Original air date: January 10, 1996
- Running time: 22 minutes

Episode chronology
← Previous "Weaving a Story"	Next → "Splitting of the Breast"

"Those women longed for the touch of others' lips, and thus invited their kisses" (Note: Japanese: 嘘と沈黙, Hepburn: Uso to chinmoku; lit. 'Lies and Silences') is the fifteenth episode of the Japanese anime television series Neon Genesis Evangelion, which was created by animation studio Gainax. The episode, written by Hideaki Anno and Akio Satsukawa and directed by Naoyasu Habu, was first broadcast on TV Tokyo on January 10, 1996. The series is set fifteen years after a worldwide cataclysm known as Second Impact and is mostly set in the futuristic, fortified city of Tokyo-3. The series' protagonist is Shinji Ikari, a teenage boy who is recruited by his father Gendo into the special military organization Nerv to pilot a gigantic, biomechanical mecha named Evangelion into combat against beings called Angels.

In the course of the episode, the agent Ryoji Kaji conducts investigations into an institute called Marduk and gathers together with his Nerv colleagues Ritsuko Akagi and Misato Katsuragi for a party. After the party, Misato, Ryoji's ex-girlfriend, confesses to him the real reason why she left him years before. Meanwhile, Shinji meets his father to visit the grave of his mother, Yui, and kisses fellow pilot Asuka Langley Soryu.

According to screenwriter Satsukawa, "Those women longed for the touch of others' lips, and thus invited their kisses" is the Neon Genesis Evangelion episode in which his personality is most reflected. During the episode, entirely focused on the relationships of the characters and devoid of action scenes, use is made of religious symbolism and music outside the original soundtrack of the series, including Johann Sebastian Bach's "Suite for Cello Solo No.1 in G Major".

"Those women longed for the touch of others' lips, and thus invited their kisses" drew a 6% audience share on Japanese television and received mixed reception from critics. Some reviewers criticized the script, the interpretation of Kotono Mitsuishi, Misato's voice actress, the music, and Asuka's behavior. Other reviewers appreciated the kiss between Shinji and Asuka and the one between Misato and Kaji, praising the religious symbolism and the focus on the relationships between the protagonists.

== Plot ==
The commander and deputy commander of the paramilitary agency Nerv, Gendo Ikari and Kozo Fuyutsuki, discuss their projects and Ryoji Kaji, a secret agent engaged in investigations in Kyoto into an institute called Marduk. Meanwhile, Shinji Ikari, a pilot at Nerv, asks his colleague Rei Ayanami what kind of person his father Gendo is and tells her that she reminds him of a maternal figure. Misato Katsuragi, head of the strategic department of Nerv and legal guardian of Shinji and Asuka Langley Soryu, heads to a wedding party with her friend Ritsuko Akagi and Kaji, her ex-boyfriend.

Shinji visits his mother's grave with his father, then returns home to play the cello. Asuka, who left shortly before for a date, also returns home and compliments Shinji's cello playing. Feeling bored, Asuka suggests to Shinji that he should kiss her, and the two exchange a kiss. Meanwhile, a drunk Misato is escorted home by Kaji; she reveals along the way to Kaji that the real reason why she broke up with him years before was because he reminded her of her father, with whom she had a conflicted relationship. Misato bursts into tears, and Kaji kisses her. The next day Misato discovers Kaji secretly entering the deepest section of the Nerv headquarters; Kaji then shows her a crucified giant, which he identifies as Adam, the first Angel.

== Production ==
=== Series and episode background ===
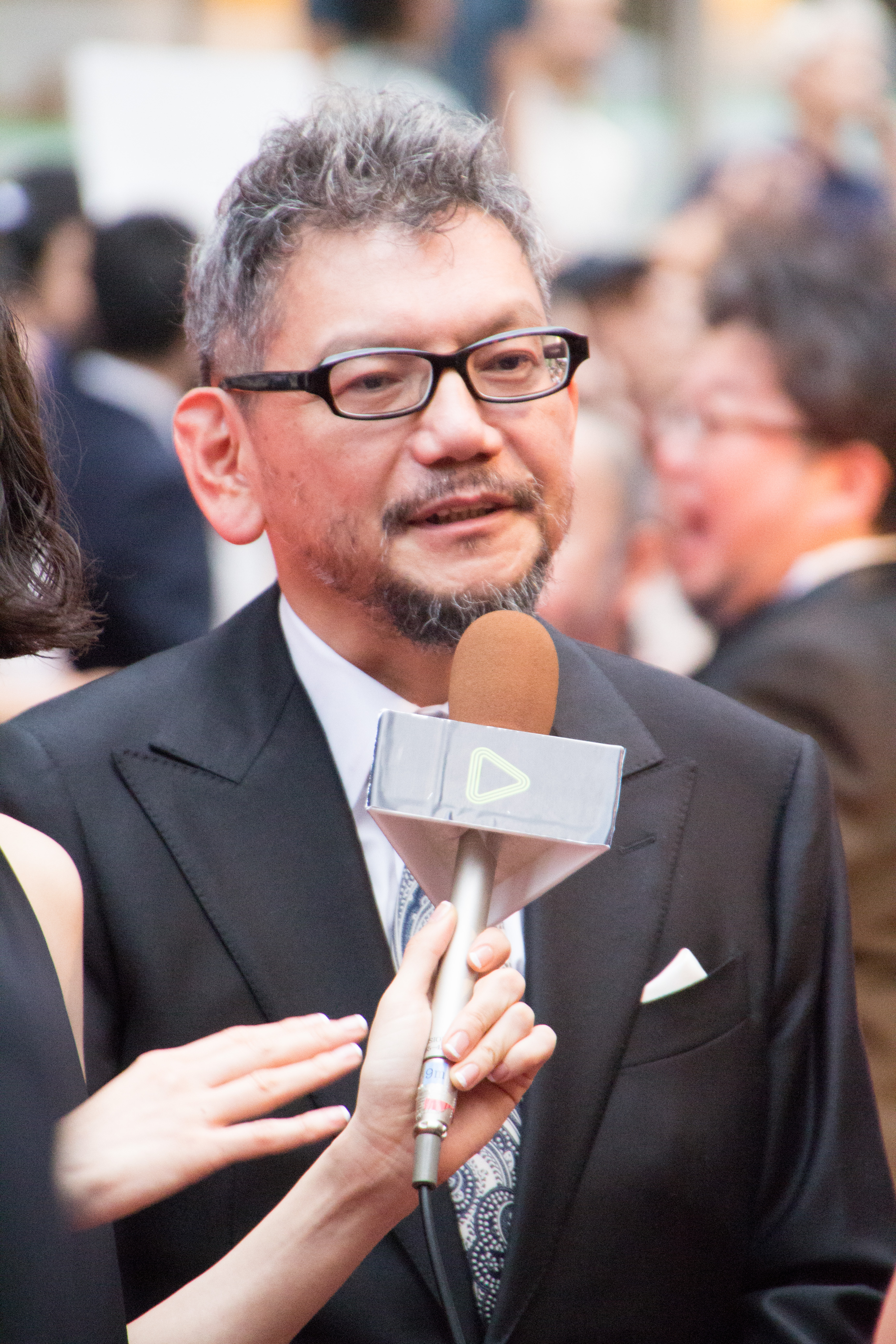
Neon Genesis Evangelion director Hideaki Anno

In 1993, Gainax wrote a presentation document for Neon Genesis Evangelion entitled New Century Evangelion (tentative name) Proposal, (Note: Japanese: 新世紀エヴァンゲリオン (仮) 企画書, Hepburn: Shinseiki Evangelion (kari) kikakusho) containing the initial synopsis for the planned episodes. The Proposal document was then published in 1994. For the first twelve episodes aired, the company roughly followed the schedule envisioned in the first draft, with only a few minor script differences. However, from the thirteenth episode onward, the production deviated from the original plan of the writers and what had been initially envisioned in the submission document. According to Michael House, translator for Gainax at the time, Neon Genesis Evangelion's main director Hideaki Anno initially intended during the making of the series to give the story a happy ending. However, during production, Anno realized that he had created characters that were too problematic, so he changed his plans. According to Hiroki Azuma, a culture critic who personally interviewed the director, Anno began to criticize obsessive anime fans—known as otaku in Japanese—whom he considered too close-minded and introverted, and so changed his original plans by creating a more dramatic and introspective story toward the middle of the series. Beginning with "Lilliputian Hitcher", the production also ran into severe scheduling problems because of delays in episode delivery. Gainax had completed only twelve episodes by the time the series began airing after nearly two years of production, leaving the staff to produce the remaining fourteen in just six months—roughly one-third of the time they had spent on the first twelve.

The fifteenth episode of the series was originally to be titled "Shinji, once again" (Note: Japanese: シンジ、ふたたび, Hepburn: Shinji, futatabi), rather than "Those women longed for the touch of others' lips, and thus invited their kisses". During "Shinji, once again", which was part of a series of episodes with the same basic theme, Shinji would make the decision to ride the Eva Unit 01 once again after "a recovery". The heavily damaged Eva-01 would also be remodeled and upgraded. The staff decided to abandon the original idea while working on it, with some of the ideas later being used for the sixteenth episode, "Splitting of the Breast", or the nineteenth episode, "Introjection". The exploration of Misato's past and inclusion of a scene concerning "romance comedy" was initially supposed to occur in the seventeenth episode, entitled "Asuka's First Date" (Note: Japanese: アスカ、初デート, Hepburn: Asuka, hatsu dēto) in the Proposal. The Proposal does not specify if "romance comedy" was referring to the kiss between Shinji and Asuka or something else. In the final version of the episode, Kaji shows Misato a giant identified as the first Angel, Adam; it is revealed in the series finale that the giant's true identity is that of Lilith, the second Angel. According to character designer Yoshiyuki Sadamoto, the original story for the series did not feature Lilith, but was included following the premiere of the series and some staff research performed on Christianity; Sadamoto stated that Lilith's inclusion occurred because "not touching [her] seemed to hurt Anno's pride".

Hideaki Anno and Akio Satsukawa wrote the screenplay, while Jun'ichi Satō produced the storyboards under the pseudonym Kiichi Hadame. Satō, who previously worked on Sailor Moon, wrote episodes with important moments between Misato and Kaji, like the twelve-first. Naoyasu Habu served as director, with Masahiko Ohtsuka as assistant director. Shunji Suzuki worked as chief animator with Katsuichi Nakayama and Naoya Furukawa as assistant chief animators, while Mitsuo Iso and Takeshi Honda served as assistant character designers. Production involved other studios besides Gainax, such as Cosmos, Studio Mark, and FAI International. In an interview, Satsukawa stated that the fifteenth one is the Neon Genesis Evangelion episode in which his personality is reflected the most, as there is no Angel and only one scene with the Evangelions.

=== Development ===
In the wedding scene with Misato, Ritsuko, and Kaji, the staff added a line in which Kaji says, "To live is to change". According to members of the series' staff, Hideaki Anno often includes remarks of this kind in his works to ease his own anxiety, even though, in their view, he never truly changes as a person. Yoshiyuki Sadamoto contrasted Anno with Mobile Suit Gundam series director Yoshiyuki Tomino. Sadamoto argued that, despite Tomino's outward stubbornness, he genuinely takes an interest in other people, especially women; Anno, by contrast, urges himself to change and not withdraw from others through statements of that kind, yet, according to Sadamoto, he has no genuine interest in other people. In the same scene, Misato fixes Kaji's tie, and he thanks her in a close-up. Yūichirō Oguro, the editor of supplemental materials included in the Japanese edition of the series, stated that the use of close-ups is typical of Satō's style. According to Satō, the original storyboard for the scene where Kaji kisses Misato did not specify whether Misato's hands should remain dangling or hug Kaji's back, and Anno made a decision later; Misato raises her hands and then lowers them again in the final version, as if she was hesitating over whether or not she should accept Kaji's kiss.

In the episode's original draft, the informant who provides Kaji with information was a man rather than a woman and, unlike in the final version, did not use feeding stray cats as a cover. In the following scenes, Hikari would have invited Asuka out for ice cream, while Asuka would have expressed concern for Shinji and recognized Hikari's feelings for Toji, suggesting a double date. Other dialogue differences involve Ritsuko's scene, in which she would have said that life is interesting precisely because the human heart harbors contradictory feelings, and Kaji's conversation with Misato, in which he would have remarked that she had become more honest with age, while Misato would have replied that she would not even have had the courage to speak to him if not for the alcohol. In the scene where Shinji looks at Rei, Asuka was also meant to show an annoyed expression. Before the storyboard stage, Yui's date of death had not yet been established, and Misato would have mistaken the giant beneath Nerv headquarters for Eva-03.

For the scene in which Kaji nostalgically reflects on Misato having started wearing high heels, the staff drew on one of Hideaki Anno's personal experiences. Before the storyboard stage, Gainax also planned a scene showing the attractions at the amusement park during Asuka's date. Mitsuo Iso drew the second Angel, Lilith. In Gainax's original design, the ruins of an ancient ruin called Arqa (アルカ, Aruka) were to be revealed beneath Nerv headquarters in the second half of the series; Arqa was later eliminated in the final version of the series, and Gainax asked Mitsuo Iso to design Terminal Dogma, its replacement. Iso depicted Lilith, then referred to as Adam, hanging from a cross with a regular crystalline structure, with the idea that it was a special material that could resist its "force field." Iso drew details of the seven eyes of Lilith's mask following the director's instructions. In his original designs, Lilith would have had writing on its hands and a swollen abdomen, similar to that of a pregnant woman; however, Anno rejected the proposal to avoid suggesting deformity or disability. The idea of the mutilated lower body also came to Iso; Iso himself noted that even in the works of anime director Mamoru Oshii, with whom he had worked in the past, there are characters with similar lower bodies.

=== Music and voice acting ===
"Suite n. 1" by Bach

Misato's voice actress Kotono Mitsuishi sang a cover of Bart Howard's song "Fly Me to the Moon", called "Misato 4beat", which was used as the episode's ending theme. The staff used an instrumental piano version of the same song when Misato is kissed by Kaji. In addition to the original soundtrack of the series, composed by Shirō Sagisu, in the wedding scene the staff used "Tentoumushi no sanba" (Note: Japanese: てんとう虫のサンバ; lit. 'The Ladybug's Samba'), a pre-existing piece composed by Daizo Saito and Shunichi Makaino. "Tentoumushi no sanba" was popular in Japan at the time and was usually used during weddings. The staff recorded the song during dubbing without using a pre-existing recording; Iwao, Nagasawa, Miyamura, and Ogata recorded the song.

Shinji plays Johann Sebastian Bach's "Suite for Cello Solo No.1 in G Major" on the cello in another scene from the episode. When questioned about the choice to have Shinji play a cello, Anno replied that "it was just that the character gave off the feeling of a cello"; it was actually Akio Satsukawa who proposed it while writing the episode. Satsukawa, known for using classical music pieces in his works, such as Manon Lescaut and Madama Butterfly, also suggested using Bach's composition. (Note: The piece was later used for the movie Evangelion: Death and Rebirth (1997) and added to several soundtrack albums of the series, including Neon Genesis Evangelion: S² Works, Refrain of Evangelion and Neon Genesis Evangelion Soundtrack 25th Anniversary Box.) Academic Heike Hoffer noted how choosing Bach's piece could be a way for the writers to delve deeper into Shinji's psychology; the piece requires a certain level of skill to play, and this allows Shinji to be depicted as a yūtōsei (優等生), a model student, a figure very present in Japanese society and in anime. The scene does not use the usual anime cinematographic clichés in which a character does something extraordinary and "élite"; furthermore, Shinji, usually worried about other people's opinions and in need of approval, does something alone, without being seen by anyone and seen from behind. According to Hoffer, this is reflected in the Proposal, in which Shinji is defined as a somewhat boring and passive exemplary student.

During the kiss between Shinji and Asuka, Shinji's voice actress Megumi Ogata held her breath throughout the scene. Furthermore, to voice Asuka's gargle after the kiss, her voice actress, Yūko Miyamura, actually gargled in front of her microphone. Miki Nagasawa, Kōichi Nagano, Fumihiko Tachiki, Kōichi Yamadera, Junko Iwao, and Tomokazu Seki, members of the series' primary voice staff, also voiced several unidentified background characters over the course of the episode.

== Cultural references and themes ==
Some of the main themes Neon Genesis Evangelion delves into in the fifteenth episode are the exploration of the human soul, the emotional walls that separate people, and the difficulty of understanding other people. With "Those women longed for the touch of others' lips, and thus invited their kisses", the Evangelion storyline begins to move towards its third part and climax. Several mysteries, such as Gendo and Fuyutsuki's plans and Kaji's actions are revealed, and the plot enters the series' second half, which is characterized by a different tone and denser contents than the first half. At the center of the episode are Kaji's investigations, Nerv's mysteries, and the relationships between the characters, without fight scenes involving the Angels. Shinji and his father Gendo have a conversation while visiting Yui Ikari's grave after years of separation, while, as the English title says, Kaji kisses Misato, and Asuka kisses Shinji.

For writer Andrew M. Winters, Gendo and Shinji's visit to Yui's grave facilitates a conversation between Shinji and Gendo that helps Shinji develop a better understanding of their relationship. Shinji is honest about why he was afraid to visit the grave for over three years. Gendo explains that there is no body buried there, but that the gravestone is merely decorative, a way of remembering; Gendo, however, also recognizes that humans survive by forgetting. Shinji thus finds solace in his loss and better understands why he was entrusted with the task of fighting the Angels. According to scholar Hans-Georg Eilenberg, the series presents Shinji "not as a victim of circumstance but as a human being in the making". He does not merely endure his situation but repeatedly takes an active stance toward it, as he confronts his father at his mother's grave. Scholar Yoshihiro Tanigawa further noted that Evangelion does not appear to have the "Tokyocentrism" typical of Japanese animation, showing Kyoto city instead. Furthermore, for writer Álvaro Arbonés, the episode draws clear parallels between Shinji and Asuka and Kaji and Misato. According to Arbonés, Misato and Asuka are also compared, highlighting their differences; while Misato blames herself for everything bad that happens in her life, Asuka constantly blames others for everything that happens to her.

=== Psychology, relationships, and sexuality ===
During a scene with Kaji, Misato reveals to her ex-boyfriend that she left him because she realized that he resembled her father. According to Evangelion Chronicle, Misato unconsciously searches for the figure of the father in her partner. As noted by Newtype magazine, she is unable to "integrate the image of her father in her mind", and to avoid that void, she seeks an ideal father in her boyfriend; however, like many women with a similar behaviour, she becomes afraid of interacting with other people and she hurts them. For Jianne Soriano of Affinity Magazine, Misato suffers from the Electra complex, a psychological concept formulated by Carl Gustav Jung to indicate a girl's psychosexual competition with her mother for possession of her father. Misato's English voice actress Allison Keith described the scene in which she cries in front of Kaji as "the only time I saw the realistic side of the burden she carries on her shoulders". In the same scene, Misato admits with Kaji that she feels as weak as Shinji, and Keith said, "I think that Misato is much more of a child. Not only does she surround herself with Rei, Asuka, and Shinji for a sense of empowerment, because she's in charge of them, but I think also she wants to live with them because she's in arrested development herself".

Asuka Langley Soryu impulsively kisses Shinji Ikari to relieve her boredom. According to critic Fabio Bartoli, their kiss is a "negative experience that left heavy marks" on Asuka's psyche

Shinji has an important conversation with Rei in the elevator scene, telling her that she reminds him of a maternal figure. According to Evangelion Chronicle magazine, that Rei partakes in such an intimate conversation and the body language she expresses in the scene is unprecedented, and would have been unimaginable in the first part of the series; this illustrates the evolution of her character and her relationship with Shinji. Newtype magazine noted that Shinji and Rei's words and actions have moved to a place of "mutual understanding" in this part of the series, and they act like a mother and a child. Writer Kazuhisa Fujie also linked Shinji's words to the fact that Rei is actually a clone of his mother Yui. According to Álvaro Arbonés, the elevator represents a "non-place", a transitional space where most of the series' most intimate conversations take place.

The episode's Japanese title, "Lies and Silences", could refer to the secrets of Misato, the Marduk Institute, or even to Asuka. After having kissed Shinji, Asuka lies and says that she only wanted to kiss him out of boredom, as if to reassure herself. Fabio Bartoli noted that the kiss turned out to be a "negative experience that left heavy marks" on her psyche. According to the episode's original draft, Asuka's gesture of rinsing her mouth immediately after the kiss deeply hurts Shinji. For Anime News Network's Mike Crandol, the scene exemplifies how Shinji loves Asuka but does not know how to express his feelings, while Asuka has similarly romantic feelings for Shinji but "her ego prevents her from admitting it even to herself". According to fellow Anime News Network editor Lynzee Loveridge, it also reminds viewers that Asuka and Shinji are two "inexperienced kids given an impossible task and severely neglected from affection by the adults in their lives".

After her kiss with Shinji, Asuka notices that Kaji, whom she has a crush on, has Misato's lavender perfume on him, and is shocked by this revelation. According to Newtype, this is the moment when Asuka realizes she's still a child and her love for Kaji suffers a setback. The magazine Evangelion Chronicle noted that lavender has several meanings in the language of flowers, including "expectation", "doubt", and "silence". The Evangelion Glossary (エヴァンゲリオン用語事典, Evangerion Yougo Jiten) by Yahata Shoten linked lavender with the meanings of "consideration", "link". Furthermore, Ritsuko mentions the concepts of homeostasis and transistasis in one scene, saying that it is the nature of living beings to have the instinct to preserve their state with homeostasis and simultaneously to change it with transistasis. Kaji adds that these two instincts are like men and women, indicating that there is both an attitude aimed at changing the relationship and one that makes it stable in romantic relationships. The term homeostasis was coined by Walter Bradford Cannon, but the union of these two opposing qualities and the idea that they define life is a concept formulated by the Evangelion staff. Necrosis is also mentioned during the episode.

=== Religion ===
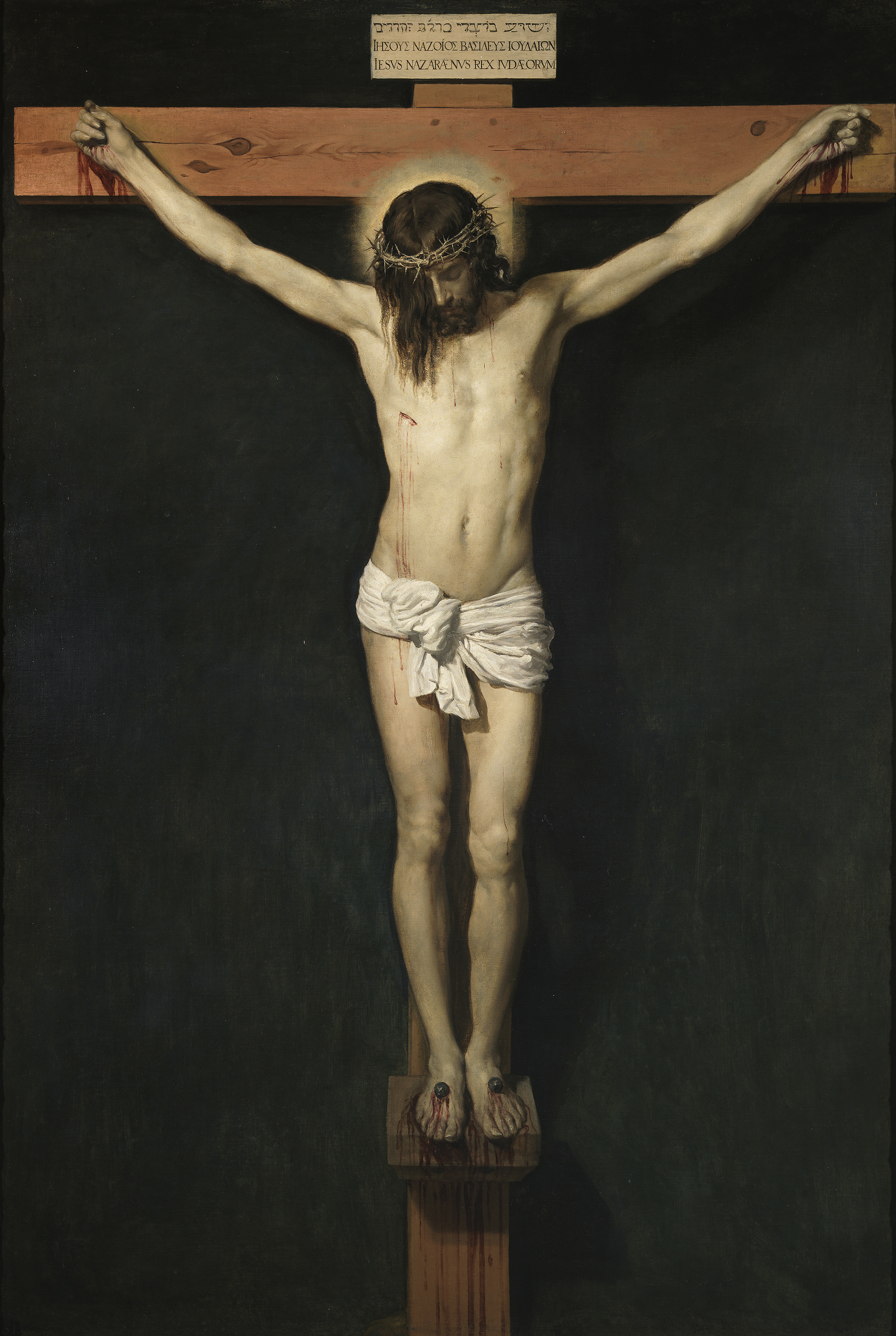
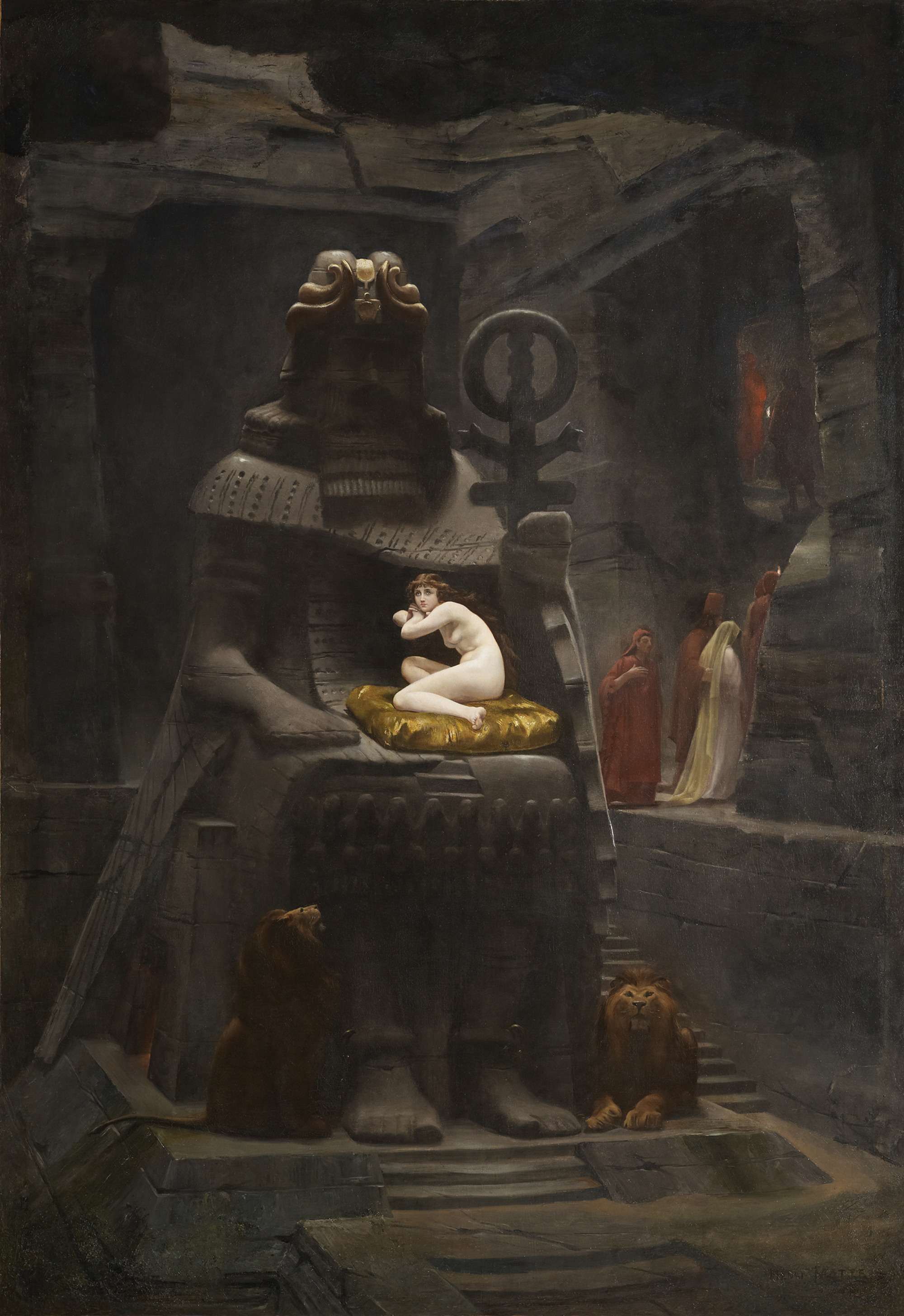
According to official materials and critics, the episode contains references to Christianity and the Bible—like the crucifixion of Jesus (left)—as well as the Mesopotamian god Marduk, also known as Bel (right).

"Those women longed for the touch of others' lips, and thus invited their kisses" contains several references to religion. At the end of the episode, a white giant identified as Adam appears; the giant is crucified and wears a mask with seven eyes. The crucifixion is a common symbol throughout the series, although it is unclear what meaning is attributed to it in the anime. According to the assistant director, Kazuya Tsurumaki, the symbol of the cross and the Christian symbolism in Neon Genesis Evangelion were primarily used for aesthetic reasons, to differentiate it from other mecha anime, and give an exotic air to the series for the Japanese target audience. The giant is pierced by a weapon called the spear of Longinus. The spear is named after the legendary Roman soldier who used his spear to pierce Jesus Christ when he was crucified on Golgotha in the Gospel of Nicodemus; legend has it that whoever wields this spear impregnated with Christ's blood will control the world. According to scholar Gavin McDowell, Evangelion's spear of Longinus is named after the Christian relic because "it serves a parallel function—a weapon of immense power capable of piercing a god". Writer Patrick Drazen also compared Longinus' spear from Evangelion to Amenonuhoko (天沼矛), the spear of the two creator kami deities Izanagi and Izanami.

Further Christian symbolism is apparent in the image of the seven eyes, or Seele's emblem, which alludes to the Book of Revelation. In said book, the number seven is frequently mentioned, and a lamb with "seven horns and seven eyes" is described; the seven eyes "are the Seven Spirits of God sent out into all the earth". The seven eyes also have a connection with the eyes of Yahweh, capable of observing all creation, also called the "pupils of God". The number seven takes on considerable importance in Kabbalistic mysticism of Judeo-Christian origin, as a symbol of completeness. According to a theory formulated by Carl Gustav Horn, editor of the North American edition of the manga, the seven eyes and Seele's emblem could be linked to the Book of Zechariah: "'See, the stone I have set in front of Joshua! There are seven eyes on that one stone, and I will engrave an inscription on it,' says the Lord Almighty, 'and I will remove the sin of this land in a single day'". Scholars Víctor Sellés de Lucas and Manuel Hernández-Pérez noted that Seele's emblem triangle may represent an inverted version of the Eye of Providence. According to the Evangelion Encyclopedia, published alongside the Italian Platinum Edition of the series, the seven eyes could also refer to the "seven wise custodians of the Torah". Writer Virginie Nebbia compared the appearance of Lilith's face to Kemur from Ultra Q or to Marilupa's mask from Hayao Miyazaki's Nausicaä of the Valley of the Wind.

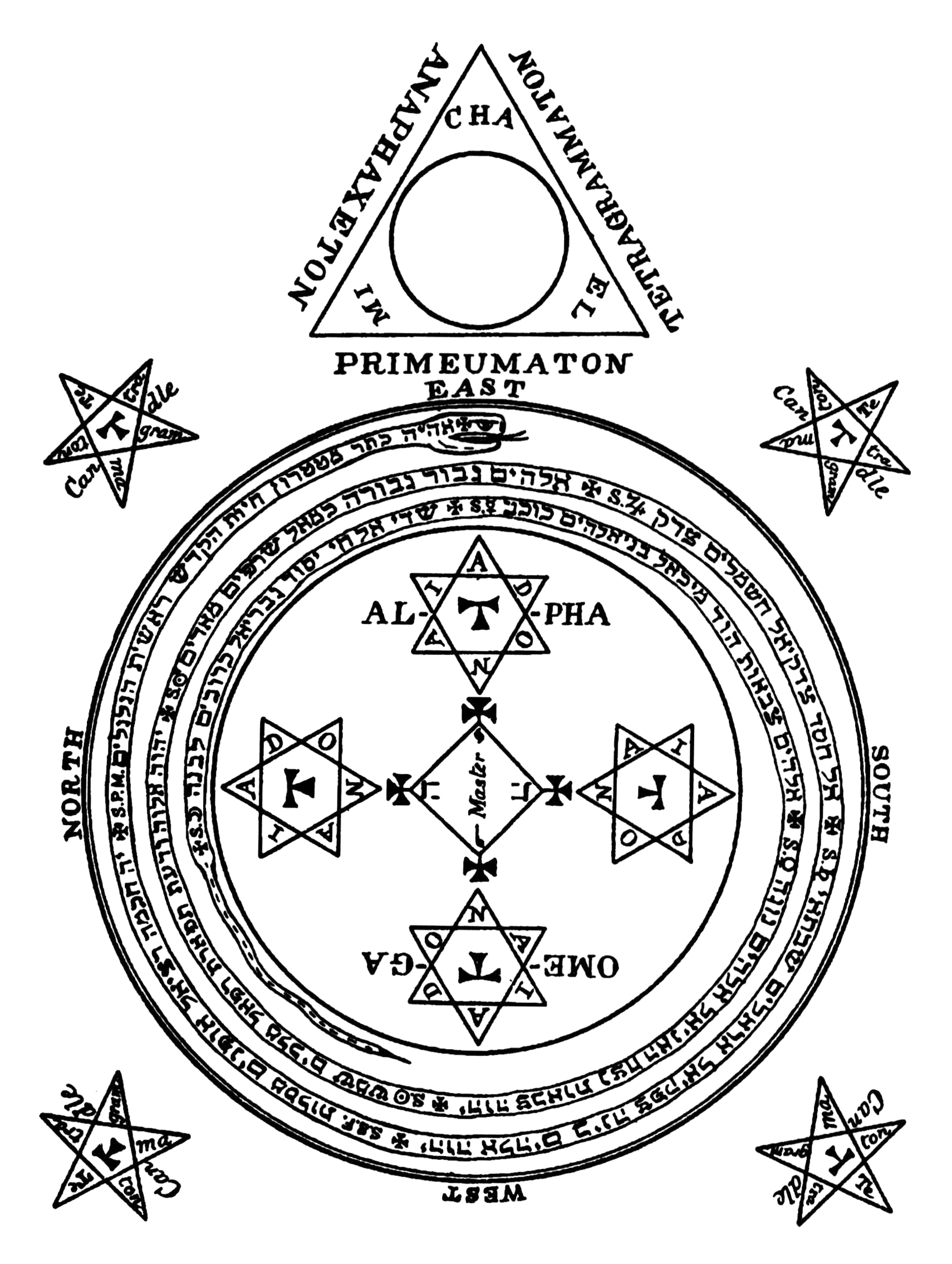
The Dummy Plug Implant has a magic circle resembling those in the grimoire The Lesser Key of Solomon

In the first scene of the episode Kaji investigates and names the Marduk Institute, an institute apparently created to select the best pilot candidates. The name of the institute originates from one of the core Babylonian deities, Marduk, also known as Bel. The god Marduk was known by about fifty different epithets. By analogy, the Marduk Institute from Neon Genesis Evangelion is connected to 108 fictional businesses. According to Dokan magazine, the name Marduk also refers to the alien race of the same name present in the Macross II series. Shannan Bio, one of the fictional companies of Marduk Institute whose company registry includes the names of Gendo, Fuyutsuki and Keel, is also mentioned in the episode. The name Shannan comes from Ryū Murakami's novel Ai to gensō no fascism (愛と幻想のファシズム; "The Fascism of Love and Fantasy"). Among its members there are Shoichi Takaenoki (高榎ショウイチ) and Kimio Chiya (千屋キミオ), whose names are borrowed from Hiroyuki Chiya (千屋裕之) and Michitaka Takaenoki (高榎通孝) from the same novel.

Throughout the episode, it is also visible a scene with Rei in the Dummy Plug Implant, formed by a test tube-like implant and brain-like tubes. The episode's original draft instructed the staff to depict Rei in the test tube with an expression resembling an archaic smile. There is a magic square on the floor, while the letters A, C, G, and T, corresponding to the four nucleotide bases, are visible in the room. The magic square comes from The Psychological Attitude of Early Buddhist Philosophy by Lama Anagarika Govinda and represents the structure and development of human consciousness. It also shows an outer rime and four stars, which writers Víctor Sellés de Lucas and Manuel Hernández-Pérez compared with The Lesser Key of Solomon. According to academic Tomoko Sakamoto and the series staff, the device serves as a backup to Rei's memory. The Evangelion Glossary (エヴァンゲリオン用語事典, Evangerion Yougo Jiten) by Yahata Shoten linked the Dummy System, based on Rei's personality, to Karl H. Pribram's holonomic brain theory, according to which memory is not an activity limited to a specific brain area.

== Reception ==
"Those women longed for the touch of others' lips, and thus invited their kisses" was first broadcast on January 10, 1996, and drew a 6% audience share on Japanese television. Merchandise on the episode has also been released.

The episode received a mixed reception. It was received positively by The Anime Café's Akio Nagatomi, who described it as a much needed break from action sequences with "a dash or two of humour thrown in for good measure", giving particular praise to the scene in which Shinji argues with Rei in the elevator. However, Nagatomi criticized the scene in which Misato and Kaji kiss; while deeming the rest of their storyline fascinating and Misato's motivations as credible, he found Mitsuishi's performance lacking, and their kiss scene as being "true to typical Anno style[;] overdone, complete with violins swelling to a near crippling cliché crescendo". For Digitally Obsessed's Joel Cunningham "Those women longed for the touch of others' lips, and thus invited their kisses" was good overall; he praised the several "nice interactions" between Kaji and Misato, and the "particularly funny exchange" between Shinji and Asuka. He acknowledged that as the focus was on the characters rather than the plot, it was "a pretty uneventful episode", one that is "definitely [...] for the true fans". Comic Book Resources' Theo Kogod criticized Asuka's behavior in forcing Shinji to kiss her, viewing the kiss as one of the worst things Asuka has ever done. Ex magazine's Kenneth Jin-ho Cho criticized "Tentoumushi no sanba"—played for three seconds during the wedding scene and added to the album Neon Genesis Evangelion Addition—as the "most puzzling" track of the album.

Other critics positively received the episode. Film School Rejects' Max Covill praised "Those women longed for the touch of others' lips, and thus invited their kisses", saying, "Outside the wonderful relationship drama, this episode features one of the best cliffhangers in the entire run". Covill also mentioned three scenes from the episode among Evangelion's "perfect shots", including the final scene in which the crucified giant is revealed for its "striking" religious symbolism. DVD Talk plauded "Those women longed for the touch of others' lips, and thus invited their kisses" and the following two installments as "excellent" for their "consistent batch of character drama and lighter moments". Yahoo! website similarly lauded the episode for its "several interesting character moments". For the writer Dennis Redmond, the scene in which Shinji plays the cello is "an intriguing moment". The academic Heike Hoffer wrote that some Japanese viewers reported having been unfamiliar with Bach's First Suite and having heard it for the first time in the episode; this inspired them to find out more about Bach's music based on their positive impressions of the piece. Collider writer Mishelle Macias described Bach's piece as "an enticing one to listen to in such a troubled atmosphere as the plot presented in Evangelion". Wired magazine ranked Asuka and Shinji's kiss third among the best anime kisses; Anime News Network's Lynzee Loveridge similarly listed it among the seven anime kisses "heard 'round the world", saying the kiss plays out "humorously".
