= Period (manga) =

Japanese manga series

- First wideban volume cover
- Manga
- Written by: Sakumi Yoshino
- Published by: Shogakukan
- Imprint: Ikki Comix
- Magazine: Monthly Ikki
- Original run: June 25, 2003 – September 25, 2014
- Volumes: 5
- icon

Period (stylized as period) is a Japanese manga series written and illustrated by Sakumi Yoshino. It was serialized in Shogakukan's seinen manga magazine Monthly Ikki from June 2003 to September 2014, with its chapters collected in five wideban volumes. Period is Yoshino's last manga series, who died in April 2016.

== Publication ==
Written and illustrated by Sakumi Yoshino, Period debuted in Shogakukan's seinen manga magazine Monthly Ikki on June 25, 2003. After a four-year hiatus from June 25, 2010, the series resumed publication on April 25, 2014, and finished on September 25 of the same year, when the magazine ceased its publication. Shogakukan collected its chapters in five wideban volumes, released from May 28, 2004, to November 28, 2014. Period is Yoshino's last manga series, who died on April 20, 2016, at 57. Its five volumes were digitally available on MangaONE from July 21–24, 2016.

=== Volumes ===
No.	Japanese release date	Japanese ISBN
1	May 28, 2004	978-4-09-188491-6
2	August 30, 2005	978-4-09-188492-3
3	January 30, 2009	978-4-09-188437-4
4	July 30, 2010	978-4-09-188524-1
5	November 28, 2014	978-4-09-188670-5
