= Sakumi Yoshino =

Japanese manga artist

- Born: February 19, 1959; Ōsaka Prefecture, Japan
- Died: April 20, 2016 (aged 57)
- Occupations: Manga artist; Literary critic

Sakumi Yoshino (吉野朔実, Yoshino Sakumi; February 19, 1959 – April 20, 2016) was a Japanese manga artist and literary critic. She became known for her shōjo manga in Bouquet magazine in the 1980s and 1990s. In the late 1990s, she also started drawing seinen manga and publishing essays on film, manga and literature.

== Life and career ==
Yoshino was born in 1959 in Osaka. She developed a passion for drawing while in elementary school and became an avid manga reader, becoming especially fond of shōjo manga and artists from the Year 24 Group such as Moto Hagio, Ryoko Yamagishi and Yumiko Oshima. Initially, Yoshino did not aspire to become a manga artist or work for a company after high school. When a classmate of hers began a career as a professional manga artist, however, she decided to give it a try as well.

Yoshino had an independent start in the industry, occasionally providing temporary assistance to other manga artists but not regularly, and did not attend art school. Her first work as a professional manga artist was the short story "Utsu Yori Sō ga Yoroshii no!", which appeared in the January 1980 issue of Bouquet. A few years into her career, she developed a passion for drawing rather than just seeing it as a way to make ends meet and moved to Tokyo to fully focus on her career in 1985. She was one of the most prominent artists working for Bouquet in the 1980s and 1990s, creating series such as Shōnen wa Kōya wo Mezasu and Juliet no Tamago for the magazine.

When the editorial team of Bouquet changed and the magazine was eventually shut down at the end of the 1990s, Yoshino switched from Shueisha to publishing with Shogakukan. With Shogakukan, she drew short stories and series both for the magazine Petit Flower and its successor Flowers, both of which had a similar target group of young women as the magazine she previously worked with, and the seinen manga magazine Big Comic Spirits, which had adult men as its main target group. In 2002, she created the cover illustration for the first issue of Flowers. She also became an active film and literature critic, publishing essays and predictions of horse racing. Her book-related essay manga Yoshino Sakumi Gekijō ran for 20 years in a literary magazine.

In 2003, Yoshino approached the seinen magazine Monthly Ikki, which then had recently become a standalone monthly magazine, to draw the series Period. She felt that Monthly Ikki would allow her to write what she wanted as the manga revolved around the theme of violence in different forms.

Yoshino died in 2016 at the age of 57 due to illness. A few days after her death, the June issue of Flowers published her short story "Itsuka Midori no Hanataba ni" posthumously and an interview with her as part of the magazine's 15th anniversary.

== Style ==
Yoshino considers manga artists Yumiko Oshima and Moto Hagio as her greatest influences. Similar to these two artists, mother-daughter relationships are a recurring theme for Yoshino.

Yoshino preferred drawing short stories and episodic series such as Itaike na Hitomi over continuous series as she was fatigued by committing to character development and solving issues coming up in the story line. Her preference for short stories was also due to their capacity to incorporate sudden and violent breaks in storytelling, which allowed her to conclude a manga abruptly the need for extensive justification.

While her work for female readers features an irregular panel layout, she arranges panels in separate squares in her work for seinen magazines.

== Legacy ==
Yoshino's work has been translated into Chinese and Korean and was translated into French in 2024. Her short story Kioku no Gihō was adapted into a live-action film in 2020.

== Works ==
=== Series ===
Title	Year	Notes	Refs
Groovy Night (グルービーナイト)	1981	Serialized in Bouquet; Published by Shueisha in 1 vol.	
Gekka no Ichigun (月下の一群)	1982–1983	Serialized in Bouquet; Published by Shueisha in 3 vol.	
Happy Age	1984–1985	Published by Shueisha in 2 vol.	
Shōnen wa Kōya wo Mezasu (少年は荒野をめざす)	1985–1987	Serialized in Bouquet; Published by Shueisha in 6 vol.	
Juliet no Tamago (ジュリエットの卵)	1988–1989	Serialized in Bouquet; Published by Shueisha in 5 vol.	
La Masquera	1990	Published by Shueisha in 1 vol.	
Itaike na Hitomi (いたいけな瞳)	1990–1993	Serialized in Bouquet; Published by Shueisha in 8 vol.	
Eccentrics	1993–1994	Published by Shueisha in 4 vol.	
Boku Dake ga Shitteiru (ぼくだけが知っている)	1994–1998	Serialized in Bouquet and Bouquet Deluxe; Published by Shueisha in 5 vol.	
Renaiteki Shunkan (恋愛的瞬間)	1996	Serialized in Bouquet; Published by Shueisha in 5 vol.	
Yoshino Sakumi Gekijō (吉野朔実劇場)	1996–2016	Essay manga Serialized in Hon no Zasshi; Published by Hon no Zasshisha in 11 vol.	
Tōko (瞳子)	2001	Serialized in Weekly Big Comic Spirits; Published by Shogakukan in 1 vol.	
Period	2003–2014	Serialized in Monthly Ikki; Published by Shogakukan in 5 vol.	
Tōmei Ningen no Shissō (透明人間の失踪)	2003	Serialized in Flowers; Published by Shogakukan in 1 vol.	

=== Short story collections ===
Title	Year	Notes	Refs
Ōsama no Dinner (王様のDINNER)	1985	Short story collection published by Shueisha in 1 vol.	
Tenshi no Koe (天使の声)	1988	Short story collection published by Shueisha in 1 vol.	
Gūrudo wo Kiki Nagara (グールドを聴きながら)	2000	Short story collection published by Shogakukan in 1 vol. Includes "Gūrudo wo Kiki Nagara", "haRmony", "Kodomo wa Nakanai", "Shu" and "Dry Ice"	
Kuribayashi Kanae no Hanzai (栗林かなえの犯罪)	2001	Short story collection published by Shogakukan in 1 vol. Includes "Kuribayashi Kanae no Hanzai", "Daremoinai Nohara de", " Pinhōru Keibu - Tennen no Tenmado", "Private Virus"	
Kioku no Gihō (記憶の技法)	2002	Short story collection published by Shogakukan in 1 vol.	
Itsuka Midori no Hanataba ni (いつか緑の花束に)	2016	Short story collection published by Shogakukan in 1 vol. Includes "Mother", "Itsuka Midori no Hanataba ni", "Ryū no Otsukai", "Unmei no Hito", "Hana no Yōdatta"	

=== Short stories ===
Title	Year	Notes	Refs
"Utsu Yori Sō ga Yoroshii no!" (ウツよりソウがよろしいの!)	1980	Short story published in Bouquet	
"Tasogare Complex" (たそがれコンプレックス)	1980	Short story published in Bouquet	
"Henjin in the Onshitsu" (変人 in the 温室)	1980	Short story published in Bouquet	
"Kin'iro no Rakuyō no Furishikiru…" (金色の落葉のふりしきる...)	1980	Short story published in Bouquet	
"Yuki no Niwa yori Mezameyo" (雪の庭よりめざめよ)	1981	Short story published in Bouquet Deluxe	
"Papillon Road" (パピヨン・ロード)	1981	Short story published in Bouquet	
"Tristan"	1983	Short story published in Bouquet Deluxe	
"Ōsama no Dinner" (王様のDINNER)	1984	Short story published in Bouquet Deluxe	
"Zanmu" (残夢)	1985	Short story published in Bouquet Selection	
"Tenshi no Koe" (天使の声)	1988	Short story published in Bouquet	
"Suika" (水瓜)	2007	Short story published in Flowers	
"Itsuka Midori no Hanataba ni" (いつか緑の花束に)	2016	Short story published in Flowers	
