= Lilliputian Hitcher =

- Neon Genesis Evangelion episode
- Dr. Ritsuko Akagi among the cables of the Magi System. Critic Mariana Ortega compared Ritsuko's image in the Magi to Evangelion's pilots in their mecha, describing the mother figure in Neon Genesis Evangelion as metaphorically and literally cannibalistic.
- Episode no.: Episode 13
- Directed by: Tensai Okamura
- Written by: Hideaki Anno, Akio Satsukawa, Mitsuo Iso
- Original air date: December 27, 1995
- Running time: 22 minutes

Episode chronology
← Previous "She said, 'Don't make others suffer for your personal hatred.'"	Next → "Weaving a Story"

"Lilliputian Hitcher" (Note: Japanese: 使徒、侵入, Hepburn: Shito, shinnyū; lit. 'Apostle, invasion') is the thirteenth episode of the Japanese anime television series Neon Genesis Evangelion, which was created by anime studio Gainax. The episode, written by Hideaki Anno, Mitsuo Iso, and Akio Satsukawa and directed by Tensai Okamura, was first broadcast on TV Tokyo on December 27, 1995.

The series is set fifteen years after a worldwide cataclysm known as Second Impact and is mostly set in the futuristic, fortified city of Tokyo-3. The series' protagonist is Shinji Ikari, a teenage boy recruited by his father Gendo to the special military organization Nerv to pilot a gigantic, biomechanical mecha named Evangelion into combat against beings called Angels. During the episode, a microscopic Angel called Iruel begins to penetrate Nerv headquarters and, after a quick evolutionary leap, acquires the characteristics of a computer by attempting to hack into the agency's central supercomputer, the Magi System. Ritsuko Akagi, in charge of the Magi, tries to thwart his advance with a reverse hack.

The episode, in the animation of which Production I.G. studio was involved, initially contained many more science fiction concepts, added at the writing stage by Mitsuo Iso. In its final version, "Lilliputian Hitcher" contains several references to biology, particularly genetics, including polysomes, the Pribnow box, the central dogma of molecular biology, and the sigma factor. Its title is also a reference to the Lilliputians, the microscopic men introduced in Jonathan Swift's Gulliver's Travels.

"Lilliputian Hitcher" drew a 3.4% audience share on Japanese television. It received a generally positive reception. Reviewers praised hacking's sense of suspense, the aesthetics of the Nerv headquarters, the focus on Ritsuko's character, and the computer battle against Iruel.

== Plot ==
Shinji Ikari, Rei Ayanami, and Asuka Langley Soryu, three pilots in charge of the Evangelion mechas, are subjected to an experiment by Dr. Ritsuko Akagi, head of the technology department of the special paramilitary agency Nerv. The three pilots are placed naked inside pseudo-Evangelions called Simulation Bodies. As the pilots undergo the test, an anaerobic bacterial Angel called Iruel begins to infiltrate through the blocks in the walls of Nerv's Pribnow Box room. The pilots are ejected from Nerv's headquarters. Nerv staff notice how Iruel did not infiltrate the areas with high oxygen presence, so they attempt to eradicate the Angel by increasing the presence of ozone in the area. Iruel, however, quickly undergoes an evolutionary transformation so fast that he acquires the characteristics of a computer, thus attempting to hack into the Magi System supercomputer, Nerv's beating heart.

Iruel infiltrates the supercomputer and tries to induce the headquarters into self-destruct mode. Its hacking is temporarily slowed down by Ritsuko, who devises a strategy called "reverse hack" in an attempt to defeat the Angel, believing it is better to increase the enemy's evolution and insert a program to make Iruel choose to coexist with the Magi System. During the operation, Dr. Akagi talks to Nerv's Major Misato Katsuragi discussing her relationship with her mother Naoko, whom she respected but hated at the same time. Ritsuko's program defeats Iruel, the headquarters are saved, and the central computer returns to ordinary mode.

== Production ==
In 1993, Gainax wrote a presentation document for Neon Genesis Evangelion entitled New Century Evangelion (tentative name) Proposal (新世紀エヴァンゲリオン (仮) 企画書, Shinseiki Evangelion (kari) kikakusho), containing the initial synopsis for the planned episodes. The Proposal document was then published in 1994. For the first twelve episodes aired, the company roughly followed the schedule envisioned by the first draft, with only a few minor script differences. From the thirteenth episode onward, however, the production deviated from the original plan of the writers and from what was initially envisioned in the submission document. The thirteenth episode of the series was to be titled "What comes after fear" (恐怖の後に来るものは, Kyōfu no nochi ni kuru mono wa); during the installment Shinji would be defeated in combat and trapped inside an Angel, beginning a trilogy of episodes with the same basic theme. The staff in progress abandoned the original project, and some of the ideas for the trilogy were later transferred and condensed into the sixteenth episode. According to Michael House, translator at the time for Gainax, the phrase "The end point of evolution is death," uttered by Gendo during "Lilliputian Hitcher," represents a watershed within the series' production. Neon Genesis Evangelion's main director Hideaki Anno in the making initially intended to give the story a happy ending, but he realized that he had created characters that were too problematic during production, so he changed his plans. According to Hiroki Azuma, a culture critic who personally interviewed the director, during the series first broadcast Anno began to criticize otaku, whom he considered too closed-minded and introverted, so he changed his original plans by creating a more dramatic and introspective story toward the middle of the series. Beginning with "Lilliputian Hitcher", the production also ran into severe scheduling problems because of delays in episode delivery. Gainax had completed only twelve episodes by the time the series began airing after nearly two years of production, leaving the staff to produce the remaining fourteen in just six months—roughly one-third of the time they had spent on the first twelve.

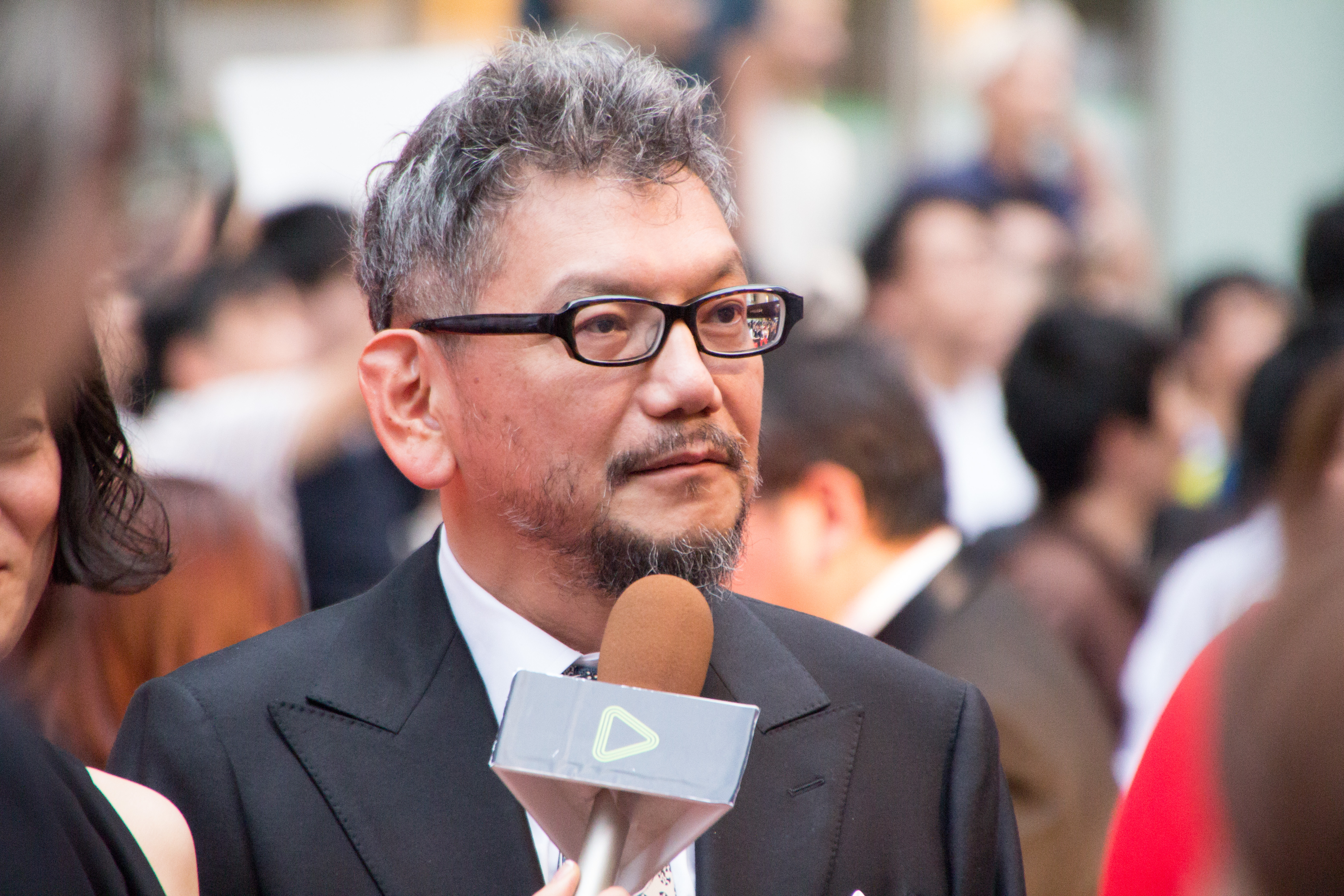
Neon Genesis Evangelion director Hideaki Anno

Animator Mitsuo Iso, screenwriter Akio Satsukawa, and Anno wrote the script for the episode; Tensai Okamura handled the storyboards and served as director, while Masahiko Otsuka worked as assistant director. Kazuya Kise took the role of a chief animator, and worked with Ise as assistant character designer. Mitsuo Iso originally joined the project as an animator, but he actively entered other jobs by freely coming up with various ideas and writing about them to the director every day. Iso initially wrote a long original script full of science fiction concepts, but Akio Satsukawa had to rework it and remove some concepts. Only later did Anno take over, who made other changes before drafting the final script. The ending of the final draft was disappointing for Iso, because it was forcibly connected to a plot that he had planned to use in another episode. Iso even offered to work on the storyboards, despite having no direct experience in the field, but received no response from the main staff.

For the structure of Central Dogma, Iso drew inspiration from The Andromeda Strain. According to Iso, Andromeda was known only to otaku at the time, so he had already anticipated that Anno would accept his proposals. He also included scientific terms like Polysome, which he learned at university. The Nerv headquarters was to have a shape reminiscent of the secondary structure of tRNA; the chamber of Guf would also be mentioned, and Gendo would lie to the Japanese government about the Angel invasion. He initially gave a humorous and comedic tone to "Lilliputian Hitcher" and many secondary characters, who were later eliminated during production. For example, the characters were depicted as exhausted from work and surrounded by energy drinks, reflecting the animation industry and the pressing broadcast deadlines. He also added a line by Maya which later became "It's the C-int" in the final version of the scrip; Maya's line, according to Iso's recollections, is a reference to an interruption code for the Z80 CPU, a very popular 8-bit CPU at the time. Iso taught himself some computer language in middle school, projecting this passion into the character of Maya. He would later return to the hacking theme in his subsequent works, including Dennō Coil and The Orbital Children.

In the final version, Misato believes that the Evas are based on a personality transcription system, whereas in the episode's original draft she instead knows that the technology underlies the Magi System. Iso suggested a senpai and kōhai, or mentor-student, relationship between Ritsuko and Maya. Since Maya had remained anonymous until then, he tried to portray her as an eccentric programmer obsessed with mathematics. In Iso's initial ideas, it would have been Ritsuko's father who built the Magi, not Naoko, but this was changed to avoid similarities with Shinji and his cold relationship with Gendo; Ritsuko would never have known her father, except indirectly and through documents. The idea of having Ritsuko use a chainsaw to open the Magi's "brains" wasn't his idea; Iso suggests the image may have been influenced by footage of raids on an Aum Shinrikyō headquarters, whose door was opened with a chainsaw. He also added details to Ritsuko's characterization to try to deepen her. In Iso's script, Ritsuko would have mentioned their first meeting to Gendo, talking about memories; Iruel would have also killed members of the Nerv staff, and would have grown into "a complex structure, similar to a futuristic city". The Angel's micromachines would also have formed a pattern similar to a crop circle. He finally proposed using classical music, something along the lines of Mozart.

Yūichirō Oguro, the editor of supplemental materials included in the Japanese edition of the series, noted how Kise has a particular style with respect to the graphical rendering of characters' faces, as he adds detailed shadows and tries to make the characters' bone structure evident. For his work as an animator, Kise was also particularly inspired by the manga version of Yoshiyuki Sadamoto, the character designer of the series, giving a different interpretation of Sadamoto's directives than the other animation directors of the anime. Evangelion Chronicle magazine, on the other hand, noted how Okamura, in charge of producing the storyboards, blends science fiction and human drama into his works. Furthermore, in the final version of the episode, Gendo and Fuyutsuki say that the Angel Iruel is "too close to Adam", the first Angel, who is believed to be kept in Nerv's headquarters; in the series finale it is revealed that Lilith, the second Angel, is secretly kept in the deepest section of Nerv, not Adam. According to character designer Yoshiyuki Sadamoto, the original story for the series did not feature Lilith, but was included following the premiere of the series and some staff research performed on Christianity; Sadamoto stated that Lilith's inclusion occurred because "not touching [her] seemed to hurt Anno's pride".

The production of "Lilliputian Hitcher" involved other companies outside Gainax, including Studio Deen, Tezuka Productions, and Production I.G. At first, Production I.G. was supposed to produce the whole anime, and the company president, Mitsuhisa Ishikawa, was willing to do so; for various reasons, including Mamoru Oshii's apparent refusal, the original plans were changed, so Production I.G. only took care of "Lilliputian Hitcher" and other individual episodes. The crew made extensive use of computer graphics throughout Evangelion, but they were all processed in a flat two-dimensional manner, as in the case of computer screens. The CGI was used as raw material for the final drawings produced by traditional manual methods, so as to create images that were more accurate than the average level at the time. The staff, therefore, although the use of computer graphics was difficult and expensive for television animation, made new attempts with technology and experimented with solutions that were innovative during the first Evangelion broadcast. The computer-scanned images of the Evangelion pilots' bodies, for example, were retouched with a Macintosh computer by a section of Gainax called Gainax Shop. To draw the Nerv's bridge instead, Gainax through a company called General Products made thirty-centimetre paper models and shot them from various angles to represent it more realistically. For the appearance of the command centre, the staff also took inspiration from the decks of battleships. Kōichi Yamadera, Kōichi Nagano, Megumi Ogata, Fujiko Takimoto, and Megumi Hayashibara played the announcers audible on the command center for "Lilliputian Hitcher". Yōko Takahashi, who had already sung the opening theme song, also sang an "Acid Bossa" version of "Fly Me to the Moon" which was later used as the episode's closing theme song.

== Cultural references and themes ==
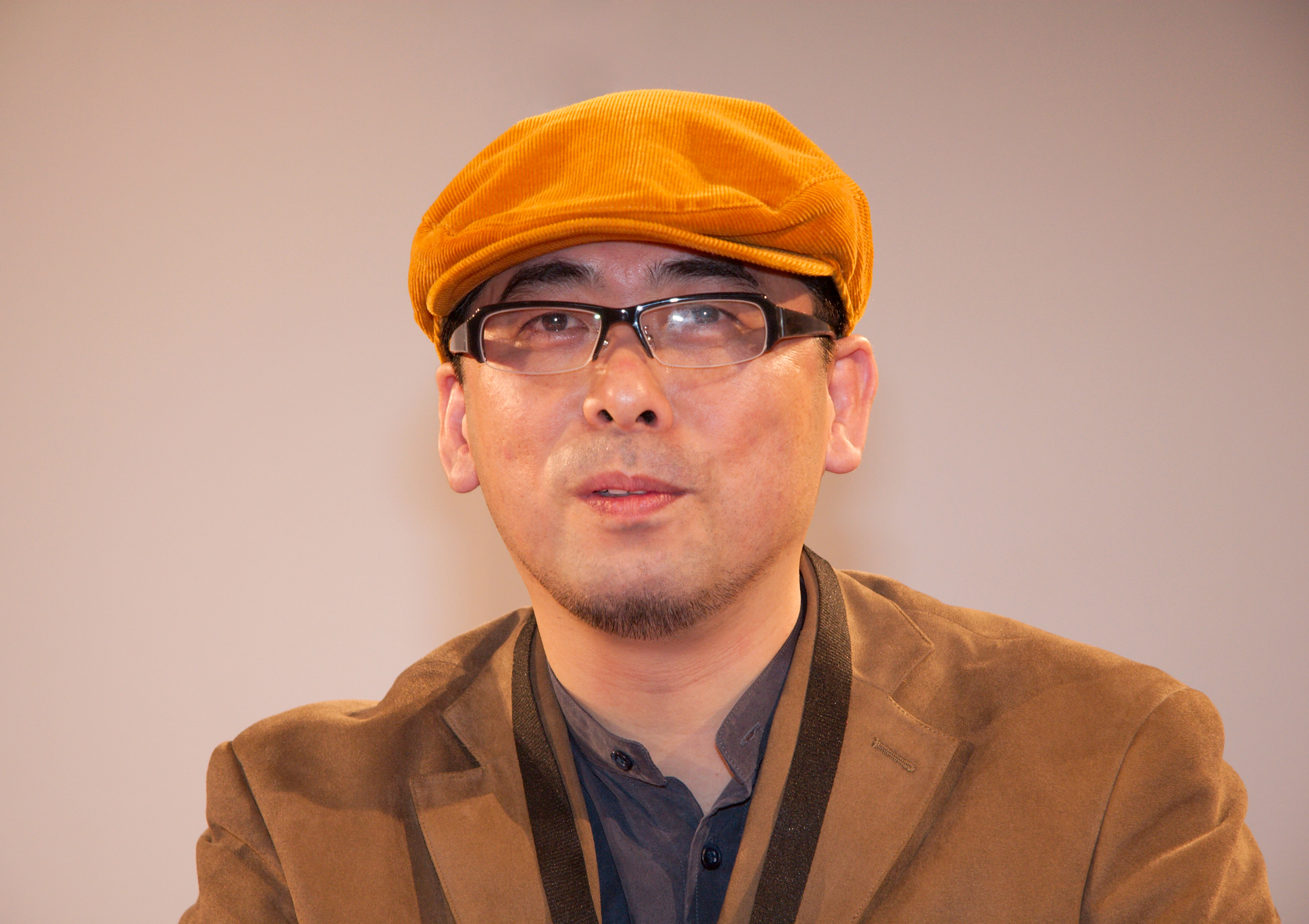
Tensai Okamura produced the storyboards for "Lilliputian Hitcher".

Evangelion Chronicle magazine identified several scientific references in "Lilliputian Hitcher", particularly nanotechnology and genetics, although these take on a different meaning than real-world biology. In one scene, machines called Polysomes, named after the polysomes from molecular biology, are presented. The room in which the initial Nerv test is carried out is called the Pribnow Box, a reference to the biological concept of the same name. Other references include the Central Dogma, whose name is taken from the central dogma of molecular biology, and the Sigma Unit, whose name refers to the sigma factor, a factor in the initiation of RNA synthesis. Evangelion Chronicle also likened Iruel's properties, such as self-replication, data processing, and colony self-regulation, to micromachines and K. Eric Drexler's universal molecular assembler. Ritsuko's strategy to annihilate Iruel, in which the Angel is induced to choose coexistence with the Magi and annihilate itself, has instead been compared to the biological concepts of apoptosis and symbiosis. Apoptosis itself and heavy water are also mentioned in the episode.

"Lilliputian Hitcher" mentions a "pituitary system" inside the Simulation Bodies, an internal system that mimics the pituitary gland; the pituitary gland resides in the brains of living beings, but since the Simulation Bodies do not have heads, the pituitary system is thought to reside in the bodies of the units. Ritsuko and Misato talk about "personality transplant OS" during Iruel's attack, a system by which an individual's personality is transferred into a seventh-generation organic computer, so it can think. The book Evangelion Glossary (エヴァンゲリオン用語事典, Evangerion Yougo Jiten) by Yahata Shoten likened the concept of personality transcription to Hans Moravec's studies on artificial intelligence and identified a reference to the actual generations of computers, stopped at the fifth at the time the series aired. Writer Kazuhisa Fujie and Martin Foster similarly wrote that, "it is believed that the powers of the Magi system far outstrip the capabilities of any of the neural network systems". Furthermore, "Lilliputian Hitcher" mentions the concept of protein barrier. Evangelion Glossary compared it to protein engineering, a discipline that uses genetic engineering to produce proteins with new functions.

According to the Evangelion Encyclopedia, published along with the Italian Platinum Edition of the series, the staff wanted Iruel to suggest an answer to the debate between evolutionism and creationism. The title of the episode is a reference to Iruel and the Lilliputians, a race of tiny men mentioned in Jonathan Swift's Gulliver's Travels. The names of the three Magi constitute a reference to the three wise men from the East mentioned in Matthew's Gospel, whom tradition indicates as Balthasar, Gaspar, and Melchior. Their names firstly appread in an eighth-century religious chronicle named Excerpta Latina Barbari. The Magi System, developed by Naoko, looks like a human brain and has been compared to the concept of artificial intelligence. Each of the individual computers has a slightly different programming model, so that they metaphorically reflect Naoko as a scientist, mother, and woman. According to the official Evangelion film books, like the three astrologers from whom it takes its name, the supercomputer is composed of three independent calculators that to solve any kind of problem consult each other and make a decision by majority. Writers Víctor Sellés de Lucas and Manuel Hernández-Pérez similarly wrote that, as later Christian tradition identified Magi as astrologers and scholars, the Magi System "operates as a council of the wise and sometimes even as an oracle of sorts".

"Lilliputian Hitcher" through the operation of the Magi also deepens Ritsuko's characterization, with a particular focus on the mother-daughter relationship between Ritsuko and Naoko, who developed the Magi's basic theory and whose personality is imprinted in the supercomputers. Academic Susan J. Napier noted that Ritsuko confesses that she never liked her mother in the episode. Mechademia journal writer Mariana Ortega also noted how Ritsuko enters the Magi System in the course of the operation just as Evangelion's pilots enter the mechas, inside of which the souls of their mothers are stored. Ortega therefore described the mother figure in Neon Genesis Evangelion as metaphorically and literally "cannibalistic". Scholar Sharalyn Orbaugh similarly wrote that, "it's noteworthy that, in every case, it is a woman whose complete intercorporation with the inorganic has produced the weapons powerful enough to resist the Angels". For writer David Bordonaba-Plou, Misato and Ritsuko use their human intuition to defeat Iruel, not relying solely on technology, another recurring theme in the series. Anime Feminist writers agreed that Neon Genesis Evangelion passes the Bechdel test, since Misato and Ritsuko talk about different things, their past, and they razz and respect each other's work. According to scholar Giuseppe Gatti, the episode also thematizes how "the relationship of intimacy between postbiotic assemblages turns out to be anything but tending to homeostatic balance or mutual benefit".

Writer Leonard Sanders wrote that the Magi "perhaps evoke a Trinity". Writer Dennis Redmond similarly described the three Magi computers and the three aspects of Naoko's personality as a "clever gender bend" of the patriarchal trinity of the Father, the Son, and the Holy Ghost. He also traced the themes of "Lilliputian Hitcher" to influences of William Gibson's Neuromancer, speculating that Naoko herself is based on Neuromancer's Marie Tessier-Ashpool. The episode director, Tensai Okamura, is himself a fan of science fiction and Gibson. Protoculture Addicts and Newtype anime magazines both noted how the last Magi to resist Iruel's attack, Casper, represents Naoko as a woman. According to scholar Álvaro Arbonés, this symbolizes that Ritsuko understands her mother's feelings as a woman. Japanese academic Daichi Nakagawa argues that the science of Evangelion does not portray inorganic physics and mechanical engineering typical of conventional science fiction released before it, but moves toward the "science of life and complex systems". According to Nakagawa, the idea of brain-like Magi, personality transplant OS, and Iruel overlap with earlier technological depictions of the cyberpunk current, but "creates a new image that goes beyond". Such devices based on complex systems science for Nakagawa create a mysterious atmosphere and effectively portray the "inner drama of the protagonists" who struggle in a mysterious world that does not go according to their wishes. The inclusion of topics such as apoptosis and biocomputers plays the role of making "the themes and contents of the plot more impressive and persuasive".

== Reception ==
"Lilliputian Hitcher" was first broadcast on December 27, 1995, and drew a 3.4% audience share on Japanese television. Merchandise on the episode has also been released. The installment received a positive reception from anime critics and reviewers. The Anime Café's Akio Nagatomi, while finding the "human interest" of the episode "simplistic and contrived", praised the sense of suspense, saying, "Very clever and fast-paced direction keep the tension levels high, in what I believe is the best episode yet". Writer Dennis Redmond positively commented on the "extraordinary aesthetic beauty of Nerv's instrument panels". In an analysis of Neon Genesis Evangelion's visual style, Slant Magazine writer Michael Peterson cited the scene in which Ritsuko is shown inside the Magi system within a dark, barely defined space as an example of Hideaki Anno's directorial style, arguing that such scenes "gain their emotional power through spatial composition". Film School Rejects' Max Covill similarly lauded "Lilliputian Hitcher" as a "great episode", especially for the "interesting" focus on Ritsuko's character. For Digitally Obsessed's Joel Cunningham the installment "makes a character that was previously bossy and annoying very sympathetic". SyFy Wire website's Daniel Dockery cited the battle against the Angel among the show's best "non-depressing" moments. Comic Book Resources editor Ajay Aravind also praised the computer battle against Iruel, ranking it as the second-best fight in Neon Genesis Evangelion.
