= Yu-no =

1996 video game

- Yu-no: A Girl Who Chants Love at the Bound of This World
- NEC PC-98 cover

この世の果てで恋を唄う少女YU-NO (Kono Yo no Hate de Koi o Utau Shōjo Yu-no)
- Genre: Science fiction
- Video game
- Developer: ELF Corporation (original); 5pb. (remake)
- Publisher: Original; ELF Corporation; Remake: JP: 5pb.; WW: Spike Chunsoft; EU: Numskull Games
- Produced by: Remake; Makoto Asada; Chiyomaru Shikura
- Designed by: Hiroyuki Kanno
- Music by: Ryu Umemoto; Ryu Takami; Kazuhiro Kanae (original); Keishi Yonao (remake)
- Genre: Graphic adventure, visual novel
- Platform: Original; NEC PC-98, Sega Saturn, Microsoft Windows; Remake; PlayStation Vita, PlayStation 4, Nintendo Switch, Microsoft Windows
- Released: December 26, 1996: Original NEC PC-98; JP: December 26, 1996 Sega Saturn; JP: December 4, 1997 Windows; JP: December 22, 2000 Remake PlayStation Vita; JP: March 16, 2017 PlayStation 4; JP: March 16, 2017; NA: October 1, 2019; EU: October 4, 2019 Nintendo Switch; JP: March 14, 2019; NA: October 1, 2019; EU: October 4, 2019 Windows; WW: October 1, 2019
- Manga
- Written by: Mario Kaneda
- Magazine: G Fantasy
- Original run: 1997 – 1998
- Original video animation

Yu-no
- Directed by: Katsuma Kanazawa; Yagoshi Mamoru
- Written by: Osamu Kudo; Sakura Momoi
- Studio: Pink Pineapple
- Licensed by: NA: NuTech Digital
- Released: October 23, 1998 – September 24, 1999
- Episodes: 4
- Manga
- Written by: Sōji Ishida
- Published by: Enterbrain
- Magazine: Comic Clear
- Original run: March 14, 2017 – March 15, 2018
- Volumes: 2
- Anime television series
- Directed by: Tetsuo Hirakawa
- Produced by: Hiroaki Tsunoda; Noritomo Isogai; Shinji Oomori; Kazuaki Takahashi; Hirohiko Kanbe; Yoshito Hayano; Hidenori Kawai; Kazuasa Umeda
- Written by: Tetsuo Hirakawa; Kenta Ihara; Keiichirou Oochi; Masahiro Yokotani
- Music by: Keishi Yonao; Ryuu Takami; Ryuu Kawamura; Evan Call
- Studio: Feel
- Licensed by: Crunchyroll
- Original network: AT-X, Tokyo MX, ABC TV, BS Fuji
- Original run: April 2, 2019 – October 1, 2019
- Episodes: 26 + OVA

Yu-no: A Girl Who Chants Love at the Bound of This World (Note: Japanese: Kono Yo no Hate de Koi o Utau Shōjo Yu-no (この世の果てで恋を唄う少女YU-NO)) is a 1996 visual novel adventure game developed and published by ELF Corporation. It was originally released as an eroge for the NEC PC-98 Japanese home computer and later ported to the Sega Saturn and Microsoft Windows platforms without the sexual content. The story follows the protagonist travelling between parallel worlds to solve the mystery of his parents' disappearance. The game uses concepts from science fiction, physics, mathematics, philosophy, history and religion to construct its fictional universe. The "Auto Diverge Mapping System" (A.D.M.S.) that displays the branching parallel worlds and storylines as a tree helps the player navigate the game world.

Yu-no was written and produced by Hiroyuki Kanno, and its FM-synth music soundtrack was composed by Ryu Umemoto, Ryu Takami and Kazuhiro Kanae, who had previously worked on C's Ware titles such as Eve Burst Error (1995). Yu-no was well-received and influential in Japan, where it revolutionized the visual novel industry and in turn had an impact on the manga and anime industries, inspiring numerous visual novel, manga and anime works.

In 2017, 5pb. (Later Mages) developed and published a remake of the game for the PlayStation Vita and PlayStation 4. Spike Chunsoft released this version for PlayStation 4, Microsoft Windows, and Nintendo Switch in 2019. The game has also been adapted into a four-part hentai original video animation, a manga and novels, and a TV anime series by Feel that aired from April to October 2019. The TV anime series is licensed by Funimation and Crunchyroll outside Japan.

== Gameplay ==
The PC-98 and Sega Saturn versions of the game are slightly different. Unless otherwise noted, the following information describes the PC-98 version.

Players travel between parallel worlds using a reflector device that uses stones to mark positions as returning locations so they can retrace their steps and enter an alternative universe. The game implements an original system called Automatic Diverge Mapping System (A.D.M.S.) that at any time in the game displays a screen showing the direction in which the player was heading along the branching plot lines.

=== A.D.M.S. ===
When a branch in the storyline nears, an indicator on the game's reflector device blinks. When the player's choice advances the storyline, their routes are recorded in the "divergence map" and the device plays a sound. The player is tasked with collecting eight jewels that are the power source of the reflector device; the divergence map shows the locations of all jewels within the storylines even before the player has reached them. In this way, A.D.M.S. is used to search through the parallel worlds. The divergence map displays time from left to right and concurrent parallel worlds are shown vertically.

Another noteworthy feature is the "jewel save". The jewels that power the reflector device can be clicked to place a mark on the divergence map, which consumes the jewel. The divergence map can later be opened and players can return to the mark instantly, regaining the jewel. If a jewel save is made before a story branch point, players can explore one scenario then quickly return and explore an alternative. This feature is akin to saving or loading the game. Key items can be carried from one world to another through the jewel save.

After the epilogue, a new feature called "Start with Best Equipment" is added. This essentially returns all jewels placed on the ADMS back to the reflector device and sends the player back to the start of the branch, with all 19 items in their inventory. Their map progress is also saved.

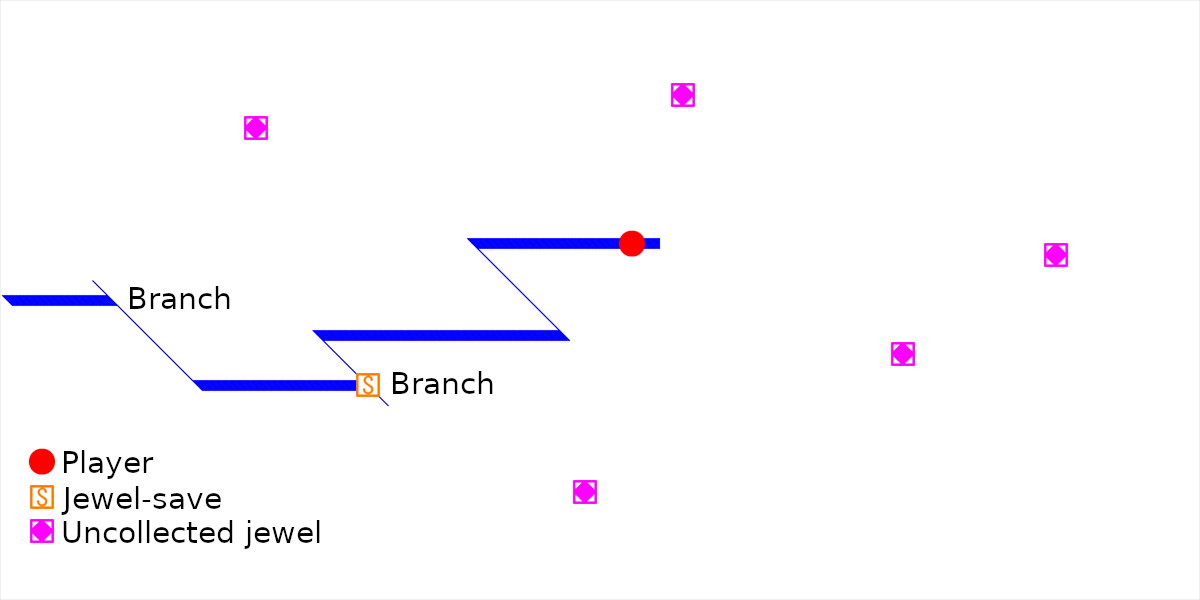
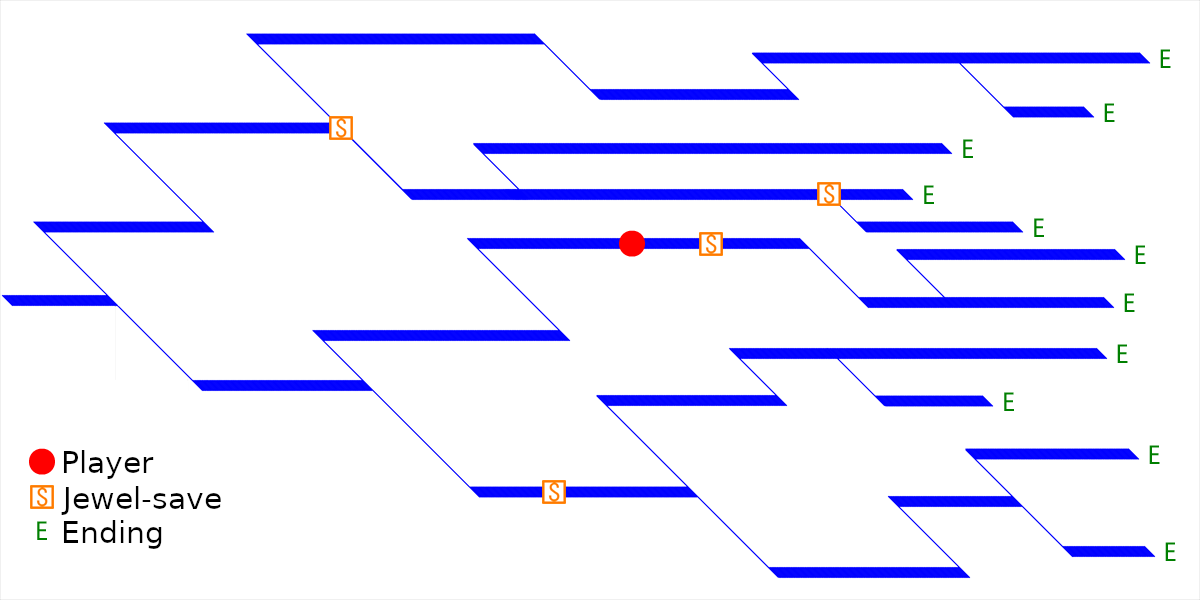
Schematics of the divergence map in two stages of the game: partially explored (top) and fully explored (bottom)

=== Prologue and epilogue ===
Sections at the beginning and end of the game have a more traditional visual-novel-style gameplay, in which players choose commands like "Look" or "Speak" from a menu. There are no branching paths in these sections and the Reflector Device cannot be used until they end.

== Synopsis ==
=== Prologue ===
The game begins with a linear prologue which introduces the setting and characters, taking place during a couple of days. The player controls Takuya Arima, a student in the fictional Japanese city Sakaimachi. Takuya had a frictive relationship with his historian father Koudai Arima, who has been declared dead after months of disappearance. Takuya barely remembers his biological mother Keiko Arima who had died when he was very young, and he now lives with his stepmother Ayumi Arima. Ayumi is still grieving the loss of Koudai after only six months of marriage and is increasingly busy with work. Eriko Takeda is Takuya's new homeroom teacher and school nurse from abroad; she has become addicted to smoking and, unfamiliar with Japanese standards, took up Takuya's advice to dress skimpily. He meets Koudai's research partner and Sakaimachi Academy's headmaster Kouzou Ryuuzouji, who requests Koudai's belongings. His secretary is Mitsuki Ichijou, a former teacher and lover of Takuya. Some other students at Takuya's school include recent transfer student Kanna Hatano, the mayor's daughter Mio Shimazu, and Masakatsu Yuuki. Takuya meets Ayumi's underling Hideo Toyotomi, whom he takes an instant disliking to.

On a nearby beach, there is a tower-like rock formation going by the names Sword Cape and Triangle Mountain, at the foot of which stand two rocks dated as 8000 years old with unknown, 400 years old writing on them. Geo Technics, the company Ayumi works for, is occupying the beach as a construction survey site, but the workers are constantly injured by inexplicable lightning strikes. Kanna habitually warns people to stay away from the area.

One evening Takuya receives a package containing an incomplete letter from Koudai and a small otherworldly device with several slots, some fitted with round jewels. The letter talks about Koudai's theory of history and multiple timelines, tells that Koudai has departed elsewhere rather than having died, that the device (known as the Reflector Device) can be used to turn back time, and that Takuya should find the missing jewels and afterwards come to Sword Cape 10 PM that night to meet somebody. Takuya arrives (without all the jewels) and encounters there a naked blonde woman, who upon awakening kisses him, dies and vanishes from existence. Ryuuzouji and Ayumi arrive; Ryuuzouji demands at gunpoint Takuya to hand over the Reflector Device, but a sudden spacetime distortion shifts Takuya to an alternate timeline where he's alone at Sword Cape.

=== A.D.M.S. section ===
At this point the Reflector Device becomes usable and the story starts to split, each main route focusing on a different female character. Jewels are found at various points throughout. A phenomenon known as Chaos Correction will loop Takuya to the beginning of this gameplay section after about two days of in-story time, that is, at the end of a route; his items but not memories are retained whenever crossing time.

After initial confusion, Takuya returns to sleep at home. The next day, he discovers that Ayumi is all right; however, neither she nor Ryuuzouji remember the confrontation from the night before. By this time Koudai's study, locked the night before, has been emptied and its contents delivered to Ryuuzouji.

- In Ayumi's route, she faces stress and humiliation from the city populace demanding the work on the beach to be stopped. Toyotomi stages a thug attack on Ayumi to steal valuable Geo Technics documents and "saves" her to earn her gratitude. Takuya can't convince Ayumi that Toyotomi is merely manipulating her, until he receives from opportunistic reporter Kaori Asakura a photo proving the connection between Toyotomi and the thugs. With the Reflector Device he arrives home early enough to out Toyotomi before the latter causes Ayumi to commit suicide. She reveals that Geo Technics is actually mining at the beach for a mineral called the Hypersense Stone, which reacts to the human mind but changes its properties upon air contact unless preserved with a formula she was developing.
- In Mio's route, Mio and Takuya discuss a controversial theory by Koudai Arima positing that every 400 years a cultural shift occurs in Japan and that a race known as the Celestials is involved; Mio hypothesises that the Celestials and Sword Cape are connected. Yuuki spies Takuya and Mio together and, in a fit of jealousy, anonymously leaks sensitive information he overheard about Mio's father to make it look like Takuya betrayed Mio, which backfires as the ensuing scandal prompts her to plan emigrating soon. Now rushing to finish her research, Mio becomes trapped in a hidden cave system she discovers beneath Sword Cape, and Takuya goes rescue her. In the caves are found an underground lake filled with glowing raw Hypersense Stones; inside the hollow rock mountain itself a tall alien machine causing the lightning strikes, zapping the workers whenever they try to transport mined Hypersense Stones away; and a passage leading to a dry well behind Ryuuzouji's mansion.
- In Mitsuki's route, she confides to Takuya odd personality changes she's observed in Ryuuzouji, such as that he's become obsessed with something, has begun smoking, and that his mother Ume Ryuuzouji became suspicious of him but reverted. Ryuuzouji has recently moved into a mansion, on the lands of which an unidentified torso has been discovered, inspiring rumours about a curse. During Takuya's and Mitsuki's investigations, he comes across near the mansion a recently built shed that's become ramshackle overnight, and that Ryuuzouji got rid of his entire furniture and prefers to sleep on a bare floor. (In another route Takuya witnesses Eriko sleeping on the floor.) After Mitsuki becomes controlled by Ryuuzouji via Niarb (a type of hypnosis according to Eriko) and kills Ume, whose corpse holds Ryuuzouji's journal revealing his encounter with a "devil" woman and subsequent descent in ableness, Takuya teams up with Eriko instead. In the shed, behind a metal door is a secret passage to the mansion and a broken interdimensional vehicle, and hidden within the shed's walls are skeletal limbs and a skull. Eriko accuses Ryuuzouji of being an impostor who killed the original and removed the head and limbs to obfuscate his identity. After Mitsuki dies defending Takuya from an escaping Ryuuzouji, Eriko explains her death was scientifically fated.
- In Kanna's route, Takuya sees her being sickly and fainting, and is shocked to find her living alone in a bare apartment. Takuya finds there bank notes documenting Koudai giving Kanna regularly money until his disappearance, and an ancient photo; it depicts Kanna hugging a woman at Sword Cape with a visible third rock, which reportedly was destroyed 50 years earlier. Kanna wears a necklace with a stone, which she says she needs to live but that it'd be destroyed by water. A private investigator named Atsushi Houjou steals it to blackmail her for information about Koudai, resulting in a fight at the city park. Eriko arrives, incapacitates Houjou and explains he was controlled with Niarb, but the stone is dissolved in the park fountain and Kanna starts dying. She tells her life story, revealing that she was born long ago to the woman in her photo, who had arrived from another land; that she grew up to her current teenager appearance much faster than normal humans and stopped aging, like her mother and Keiko; that since her mother's death she lived as a prostitute; that she moved to a new location close to Sword Cape whenever her abnormalities were found out; and that Koudai and Keiko Arima adopted her for some time. Takuya saves Kanna with a stabilised Hypersense Stone stolen in another route from Geo Technics, after which she gives the key to Koudai's study.

The key allows Takuya to enter the study before it's emptied, finding therein a journal by Koudai completing the letter from earlier. It talks about Koudai's life and how he met Keiko. Originally named Kaytia, she was the oldest living Sakaimachi inhabitant at the time but youthful in appearance with blonde hair, blind yet with an uncanny sense of her surroundings. She was a descendant of the Celestials and depended on the proximity of the Hypersense Stones beneath Sakaimachi to live. She committed suicide for an unknown reason. The Reflector Device was brought by her from her "homeland".

=== Epilogue ===
Once all jewels are collected, Takuya can enter Triangle Mountain during the correct time. A device there transports him to another world and he loses the Reflector Device. He wakes up confused in a forest and meets a mute blonde pointy-eared girl whose name he deduces as Sayless. The forest is isolated by a cliff beyond which nothing but clouds are visible, and a huge desert. They find the house of a sick knight named Illia, who tells him that the world is Dela Grante; that its inhabitants have pointy ears (like Sayless and Illia); that she is guarding it from monsters arriving from beyond the cliff, known as The Border; that every 400 years a priestess prevents an apocalypse by inhibiting a bodily function to allow "God" within her and being killed in a ritual in a city known as the Capital; that Sayless is an escaped such priestess despite recent earthquakes signifying the current apocalypse; and that Illia has a sister with no faith in Dela Grante's religion. Illia is then fatally injured when protecting Sayless from a monster.

Takuya can't cross the desert, but eventually his frustration and homesickness give way to love towards Sayless, and the two begin a happy life in Illia's house. A baby girl, Yu-no, is born to them, and grows within only four years to a teenager-like appearance. One day a dying member of nogards, a species of winged humanoids, arrives and entrusts them with her lizard-form infant, named Kun-kun by Yu-no.

Their idyllic life is interrupted as they're invaded by knights from the Capital seeking Sayless, who commits suicide upon capture. Takuya swears revenge on the God Emperor, ruler of Dela Grante residing in the Capital. Leaving Kun-kun behind, Takuya and Yu-no barely cross the desert; however, they are arrested for trespassing a temple and are separated. Takuya ends up working for months in a quarry where enslaved prisoners mine Hypersense Stones for a casket required for the priestess ritual. A machine tower like the one inside Sword Cape kills escapees with lightning. Takuya befriends another prisoner, Amanda, who resembles Kanna's mother; she is the leader of a rebel faction believing that the apocalypse and ritual are a lie by the God Emperor to keep the people in control. An earthquake destroys the quarry, leaving as the only survivors Takuya, Amanda, and the now adult Kun-kun who saves them by flying. They head for the Capital, and along the way Kun-kun becomes exhausted from carrying the other two across the desert and is eaten by them, Amanda is saddened upon learning of her sister Illia's death and has sex with Takuya, and they find a Reflector Device at a temple.

Once in the Capital, Takuya encounters a new priestess commanding troops and escapes from her into the sewers, which lead to a prison beneath the Emperor's palace. There he meets an imprisoned Ryuuzouji, who reveals that the latest priestess lost her mind as a bodily function to give up, making Takuya realise the current priestess is a brainwashed Yu-no. Takuya frees him in exchange for the information and sneaks into the palace where he cures Yu-no back to normal using Ryuuzouji's advice. Several reveals follow: The God Emperor is actually the Ayumi from the prologue, and was transported alongside Ryuuzouji to Dela Grante by the spacetime distortion; her intentions are good as the ritual is genuine; Dela Grante was constructed 8000 years earlier by a scientifically advanced race as a place to escape an impending apocalypse on Earth; Dela Grante is in an unstable interdimensional orbit around Earth and the ritual is needed every 400 years to avoid a catastrophic collision between the worlds - the computerised mind of ancient head scientist Grantia inhabits a priestess's body to steer Dela Grante, after which the priestess is ejected from the dimension and likely dies; each 400 years the worlds were also so close that some people crossed them, including previous priestess Keiko, explaining the Celestials; the race genetically modified people to have short childhoods and long lifespans but they became dependent on Hypersense Stones; they made other species to survive Dela Grante and discarded failed specimens beyond the Border; later generations couldn't understand the technology and interpreted it religiously; Eriko, who is an interdimensional investigator named Äichli:kkwádroú from yet another world, appears (later explaining smoking was foreign to her world and that she slept on the floor as a remedy for interdimensional travel); Ryuuzouji's body has been possessed the whole time by an entity, which is pursued by Eriko for effectively killing her lover by possessing him and had then arrived at Ryuuzouji's using the interdimensional vehicle. The night before the ritual, Yu-no pleads to have sex with Takuya, who reluctantly complies.

The entity attempts to prevent the ritual because it'd survive the annihilation of the worlds and so escape Eriko, but is defeated - after expelling Amanda into another dimension (said to possibly end up on Earth) with a 50-year maximum time difference, and mortally wounding Ayumi. Yu-no reduces the collision, saving Earth, but Dela Grante inevitably meets its end by impacting on Earth 8000 years in the past, and Yu-no is thrust out of Dela Grante's dimension. With the Reflector Device, and a jewel he gave her, Takuya returns to the moment at Sword Cape where he first saw Yu-no, who was the naked woman in the prologue. The two then begin drifting in a void between dimensions to the beginning of time.

== Characters ==
Character	Description	1997 Sega Saturn	1998 OVA (Japanese)	1998 OVA (English)	2017 remake	2019 anime (Japanese)	2019 anime (English)
Takuya Arima (有馬 たくや, Arima Takuya)	The protagonist of the game who inherits the Reflector device from his father to travel amongst different parallel universes.	Nobuyuki Hiyama	Susumu Chiba	Grant George	Yū Hayashi	Yū Hayashi; Saima Nakano (child)	Eric Vale; Emi Lo (baby)
Yu-no (ユーノ, Yūno)	The titular character and a mysterious girl whom Takuya encounters frequently after receiving the reflector device.	Kimiko Koyama	Kimiko Koyama	Sandy Fox	Ari Ozawa	Ari Ozawa	Sarah Wiedenheft
Kanna Hatano (波多乃 神奈, Hatano Kanna)	Takuya's mysterious transfer classmate.	Yuka Imai	Ayaha Takazuka	Philece Sampler	Maaya Uchida	Maaya Uchida	Kristen McGuire
Mio Shimazu (島津 澪, Shimazu Mio)	Takuya's classmate, the daughter of the mayor, and interested in Kodai's theories and Sword Cape.	Yumi Tōma	Yui Takama	Stephanie Sheh	Rie Kugimiya	Rie Kugimiya	Megan Shipman
Mitsuki Ichijō (一条 美月, Ichijō Mitsuki)	Ryuzoji's secretary, a former part-time teacher and Takuya's former lover.	Rei Sakuma	Kaori Okuda		Saori Ōnishi	Saori Ōnishi	Kylie Stewart
Eriko Takeda (武田 絵里子, Takeda Eriko)	The school nurse and Takuya's homeroom teacher.	Aya Hisakawa	Mie Sonozaki	Jessica Gee-George	Yū Kobayashi	Yū Kobayashi	Morgan Garrett
Kaori Asakura (朝倉 香織, Asakura Kaori)	A journalist investigating Geotech.	Michiko Neya	Mari Adachi	Philece Sampler	Rena Maeda	Rena Maeda	Kara Edwards
Ayumi Arima (有馬 亜由美, Arima Ayumi)	Takuya's stepmother and project manager at Geotech.	Kikuko Inoue	Ai Uchikawa	Mari Devon	Kaori Nazuka	Kaori Nazuka	Dawn M. Bennett
Kozo Ryuzoji (龍蔵寺 幸三, Ryūzōji Kōzō)	The headmaster of Sakaimachi High and an old friend of Kodai.	Akio Ōtsuka			Taiten Kusunoki	Taiten Kusunoki	David Wald
Ume Ryuzoji (龍蔵寺 梅, Ryūzōji Ume)	Kozo's mother.	Reiko Suzuki			Maki Izawa	Maki Izawa	Wendy Powell
Masakatsu Yuki (結城 正勝, Yūki Masakatsu)	Takuya's classmate and friend, who has a crush on Shimazu.	Tetsuya Iwanaga			Yūki Fujiwara	Yūki Fujiwara	Justin Briner
Hideo Toyotomi (豊富 秀夫, Hideo Toyotomi)	A Geotech manager under Ayumi.	Shin-ichiro Miki	Shin-ichiro Miki (uncredited)	Terrence Stone	Takuya Eguchi	Takuya Eguchi	Kyle Igneczi
Amanda (アマンダ, Amanda)	Illia's younger sister and Kanna's mother.	Yūko Mita			Marina Inoue	Marina Inoue	Alexis Tipton
Illia (アイリア, Airia)	Amanda's elder sister and a patrol knight assigned to the Border.	Masako Katsuki			Kyoko Sakai	Kyoko Sakai	Anastasia Munoz
Kodai Arima (有馬 広大, Arima Kōdai)	Takuya's father. He disappeared prior to the start of the story.	Fumihiko Tachiki			Keiji Fujiwara	Fumihiko Tachiki	Barry Yandell
Keiko Arima (有馬 恵子, Arima Keiko)	Takuya's mother and a former denizen of Dela Grante.	Chizuko Hoshino			Aya Endō	Aya Endō	Marissa Lenti
Atsushi Hojo (北条 篤, Hōjō Atsushi)	A private investigator sent by Ryuuzouji to investigate Kanna and who comes at odds with Takuya.	Takeshi Aono			Yōji Ueda	Yōji Ueda	Marcus Stimac
Marina (真理奈, Marina)	A security guard at Geotech.	Chinami Nishimura			Ayano Yamamoto	Ayano Yamamoto	
Mayor Shimazu (島津市長, Shimazu Shichō)	The mayor of Sakaimachi and Mio's father.	Eiji Yanagisawa	Masahiro Yoshida		Takehiro Hasu	Takehiro Hasu	Brian Mathis
Sayless (セーレス, Sēresu)	The latest incarnation of the priestess destined to save the world from a crisis, and Takuya's eventual wife.	Miki Takahashi	Haruhi Terada	Jessica Gee-George	Asami Sanada	Asami Sanada	Amanda Lee
Sala (サラ, Sara) (Note: "Sarah" in English releases of the anime adaptations.)	A girl whom Takuya meets on his way to the Imperial Capital.	Yumi Takada			Mari Doi	Mari Doi	Jamie Marchi
Bask (バズク, Bazuku)	The warden of the labor camp that Takuya gets sent to.	Tessho Genda			Biichi Satou	Biichi Satou	
Kun-Kun (クンクン, Kunkun)	A Nogard, a lizard-like creature which Takuya and Yu-no adopt from her dying mother.	Tomoko Kawakami			Yumibō Tai	Yuki Nagaku	Bryn Apprill
Yurika Imagawa (今川 由利香, Imagawa Yurika)	A professor acquainted with Kodai and Ryuzoji. She was trapped in the catacombs where her rotting corpse is found by Takuya during his search for Mio.						Katelyn Barr
Abel (アーベル, Āberu)	Eriko's former lover who was killed.					KENN	Brandon McInnis
Kurtz (カーツ, Kātsu)	A member of the Resistance. He is Yuki's Dela Grante counterpart.					Yūki Fujiwara	Justin Briner
Deo (デオ, Deo)	A member of the Resistance. He is Toyotomi's Dela Grante counterpart.					Takuya Eguchi	Kyle Igneczi
Joe (ジョウ, Jō)	An inmate of Takuya from the prison. He is killed attempting to escape.					Takaki Ōtomari	Austin Tindle
Asche (アッシュ, Asshu)	A Resistance member.					Yōji Ueda	Jason Douglas
Ai (アイ, Ai)	A storytelling AI hologram.					Hina Kino	
Grantia (グランティア, Gurantia)	A scientist from the first generation of Dela Grantians. To save her people from extinction, she became a mechanical being and served as a guide to future priestesses.					Yūko Kaida	Monica Rial

== Development ==
Having made the earlier successful adventure games Desire (1994) and EVE Burst Error (1995) at C's Ware, Hiroyuki Kanno and Ryu Umemoto were hired by ELF to create a game with a high budget available. The story Kanno pitched he had developed since his teens, and it was allowed to be fully realized by the budget. As with their earlier projects, Kanno and Umemoto collaborated closely. Each vital plot point was discussed in detail to achieve synergy between story and music, with musical pieces representing the characters' moods and emotions rather than characters or locations. Umemoto, a mathematics prodigy since an early age and a practitioner of Zen Buddhism, applied symbolic elements of his religion to his compositions via mathematical patterns. A new gameplay system called A.D.M.S. (Auto Diverge Mapping System) was made for the game.

=== Title ===
The bound of this world (この世の果て, kono yo no hate) referred to in the title is the location the protagonist reaches at the conclusion of the game. Yu-no is the name of a girl central to the story. The creators said "Yu-no", which comes as the last word in the Japanese title, is meant to be a subtitle. The English version of the title that is used in some artwork is stylized as "YU-NO: A girl who chants love at the bound of this world.", with a period at the end. A connection to Harlan Ellison's short story The Beast That Shouted Love at the Heart of the World has been noted by Robert Allen of Tech-Gaming.

== Releases ==
A gameplay scene from the original PC-98 version, showing Kanna Hatano at the school rooftop. Character design is by Nagaoka Yasuchika. This section employs a point-and-click interface. The Reflector Device is shown to the bottom right, with three jewels. The gem at its bottom is flashing to indicate an imminent branch.

The same scene in the remake, with a new art style and an overhauled interface. Icons mark interactable areas; grey icons indicate nothing new happens from them. Optional hints display which items to use and locations of next triggers to advance, colour-coded per route (currently, triggers to two routes are in the same place). The inventory and Reflector Device are off-screen most of the time.

=== PC-98 ===
Yu-no was released as an adult game on December 26, 1996, for the NEC PC-98; it was the last MS-DOS-based game developed by ELF. The price at the time was 9800 yen. Both floppy disk and CD-ROM versions were released; the CD-ROM edition contains arrangements of the music but is otherwise identical to the floppy edition. A special disk, ordered by sending a leaflet in the manual, contains bonus material such as an extra scenario.

=== Sega Saturn ===
Yu-no was released on the Sega Saturn console on December 4, 1997, with a recommended minimum age of 18. The price was 7800 yen, or 9800 yen bundled with a mouse. Several illustrations underneath the CD tray can only be seen after opening the game. The scenario from the PC-98 special disk was integrated into this version. As in the Windows version, some incest references have been removed. Graphics were repainted to use more colors, animation sequences were added, the music was rearranged, character voices were added, two jewels were added (total of 10) and explicit sex scenes were removed.

=== Windows ===
The PC-98 version of the game was ported to Microsoft Windows as part of the "ELF Classics" range and released on December 22, 2000. The graphics and music are equivalent to the PC-98 version but the sexual content was removed.

=== Fan translation ===
An English-language fan-made translation patch for the Windows version was released in September 2011 by TLWiki. As well as the translation, it provides re-inserted voices from the Sega Saturn version, explicit sex scenes, Ryu Umemoto's original FM score, Sega Saturn CGs and integration of the PC-98 special disk scenario. Hardcore Gaming 101 praised the patch for the quality of its translation and called it "one of the finest examples of fan efforts in video gaming".

=== Remake ===
A high-definition video remake of the game was released in March 2017. It was developed by 5pb., which acquired the rights from the now-defunct ELF. It features a remixed soundtrack and new artwork redone in a different style, with Ryo Nagi of Ar Tonelico as character designer. The decision for a new art style was made because something easier to depict in animated form was wanted, with the 2019 anime adaptation already in mind. The remake was announced in December 2014 and its release date was delayed several times – first it was 2015, then pushed to February 2016, then to the second quarter of 2016, then late 2016 and finally to March 2017. First-print copies of the PlayStation 4 and PlayStation Vita releases included ports of the original version as DLC.

An English localization was released by Spike Chunsoft on October 1, 2019, worldwide for Microsoft Windows, and in North America for Nintendo Switch and PlayStation 4; the game was released in European markets on October 4, 2019. The Switch Day 1 Edition included a side-scrolling shooting game called 8-Bit Yu-no's Great Adventure.

== Music ==
In 1997 came out both Super Soundtrack and Original Sound & Voice Collection soundtrack releases; in 2016 an album titled Tribute to Ryu Umemoto: Music from Yu-no featuring remixes by video game composers such as Hiroki Kikuta, Yuji Takenouchi, and Ippo Yamada; and in 2017 alongside the remake a 5-disc collection clocking at 15 hours containing, in addition to the albums from 1997, also recordings of the original PC-98 and remake soundtracks.

In 2011, the music of Yu-no inspired an eroge tribute music album named Tree of Knowledge. RPGFan said in 2022 that composer Ryu Umemoto's reputation has grown posthumously and praised the 5-disc collection as "must-have for fans of Umemoto, fans of Yu-no, fans of visual novels, and fans of VGM in general".

== Reception ==
As of March 2017, all versions of Yu-no have sold a total of over 380,820 copies in Japan.

Yu-no holds an average rating of 94 out of 100 on ErogameScape (EGS), making it the second highest-rated visual novel on the site.

In 2017, Famitsu readers voted Yu-no the 12th best adventure game of all time.

=== PC-98 ===
According to statistics compiled by Digital Media Insider, 45,844 (30,553 CD edition, 15,291 floppy edition) copies were sold by November 30, 1997, excluding ELF's direct mail-order sales. In the 1997 annual ranking in Digital Media Insider, the CD edition was listed in 14th place, with number-one-ranked "SHOCK PRICE Mah-jongg" selling 77,102 copies, and the top-selling adult game "Sadistic King Rance" at number three, selling 72,572 copies.

The PC version of Yu-no went on to sell over 100,000 copies, as reported in the March 1997 edition of Comptiq.

Yu-no won a reader's choice award in Blitz King's "2nd Video Game Awards Grand Prix" in May 1997. The game also was ranked ninth in E-Login's "Game and Heroine of the year 1996", and fifth in Comptiq's "1st Video Game Awards Grand Prix" in 1998.

=== Sega Saturn ===
Reception (Sega Saturn)

Review scores
Publication	Score
Famitsu	8/10, 7/10, 7/10, 5/10
RPGFan	97%
Sega Saturn Magazine	27/30

The news that the PC-98 edition would be ported to Saturn was reported by several magazines including Sega Saturn Magazine, Dengeki Sega Saturn, and Famitsu. Sega Saturn Magazine included a four-page feature on Yu-no. The Sega Saturn edition sold 139,509 copies in December 1997, and sold 240,820 copies by February 8, 1998.

Four reviewers in Famicom Tsūshin commented on the game. Three reviewers found the way the story unfolds between parallel timelines and to be the main appeal, with one reviewer saying that finding the different pathways did not feel tedious at all. Two reviewers found the prologue to be a bit slow-paced, while one reviewer found the graphics to be beautiful, but the fact that that the graphics remained static was disappointing. One reviewer founded the excessive wordplay that was common in these types of games tiresome, while the latter reviewer who gave the game the lowest score said the game would really only appeal to hardcore fans of science fiction, eroge, and bishōjo games.

Sega Saturn Magazine scored the game 27 out of 30, with its three reviewers each rating it 9 out of 10. RPGFan gave the game a 97% score, including ratings of 100% for story, 100% for control, 85% gameplay, 80% graphics, and 80% sound/music. Reviewer WooJin Lee said the story is "amazing" and praised the A.D.M.S. for adding replay value, concluding that "I feel this game to be THE best Graphical Adventure game ever, which from me (I play tons of these games) is a huge compliment".

The Sega Saturn port was voted in 2000 by Sega Saturn Magazine readers as the fourth best game on the console, with an average score of 9.4782.

=== Remake ===
Reception (remake)

Aggregate score
Aggregator	Score
Metacritic	NS: 64/100

Review scores
Publication	Score
Nintendo Life	NS: 5/10
Nintendo World Report	NS: 6/10
RPGFan	PC: 86%
Digitally Downloaded	NS: 4.5/5
Pelit	NS: 91/100
RPG Site	NS: 4/10
Tech-Gaming	NS: 91%

The remake sold over 40,000 copies within its first week of release, March 2017, which 5pb celebrated by releasing a Yu-no-themed wallpaper. Fall 2019 marked Yu-no's first official release in English, via the remake. Its belated arrival outside Japan was greeted with polarised reviews. Some felt that the game was outdated and surpassed by later visual novels, whereas others found it had stood the test of time.

Digitally Downloaded was captivated by the plot once it moved onto more intellectual topics after what the reviewer saw as a deceptively mundane intro involving a panty shot, proclaiming: "Yu-no is smart, you come to quickly realise, and then you'll start paying very close attention to every line of dialogue." RPGFan was similarly gripped in a new review for the remake. The final route was praised by Tech-Gaming as "nothing short of phenomenal"; Pelit was less enthusiastic about the route, arguing that despite the surprises the tension was deflated by the lack of the difficult nonlinear gameplay from earlier. While some were also intrigued by the plot, they were put off by the eroge aspects. RPG Site criticised Ayumi's route as the game's weakest, dependent on misunderstandings for cheap drama.

Many took issue with the game's sexual and ecchi content. Nintendo Life felt that the game's "dating-sim elements" and "grandiose narrative" clashed, leading to an "identity crisis". RPG Site counted three instances of incest and called two of them "unnecessary and gross". Digitally Downloaded held the opinion that there were both justified and unjustified cases of sexual "fanservice", saying they "are on the juvenile side of things just often enough that certain elements of the community will dismiss the game on that basis" but that "even in the fan service it gets things right far, far more often than it misfires." Pelit's reviewer conversely had little problem and outright refused to hand out a moral judgement, explaining that "games are generally not a very moral medium" in the first place. He concluded that the game has a limited audience of those intrigued by morally grey, erotic weird games and an anime style, and the rest wouldn't last the first five minutes; that encountering the school nurse clad in tight latex was a casual filter.

Opinions on the characters were split. RPG Site, Nintendo Life and Nintendo World Report couldn't tolerate main character Takuya and his lecherousness. RPG Site compared him unfavourably to Chaos;Child's Takuru Miyashiro, whose flaws he thought were better taken advantage of thematically in the respective narrative, and found the other characters weak as well. Nintendo Life asserted that the characters had become cliché and bland by today's standards. Others saw more depth in the characters. Digitally Downloaded defended Takuya's fixation with females as "appropriate characterisation for building the protagonist up as something of a mix of teenage hormones and delinquency in coming from a broken home". RPGFan enjoyed exploring the webs of interpersonal relationships, saying: "While characters fall into relatable archetypes, they are complex, compelling, and not always what they seem." Tech-Gaming said the nuances of real-life conversations were captured in Takuya's ability to read subtle cues and body language and respond accordingly, causing development over time: "Like an actual person, he's influenced by the people and actions around him, which are mirrored by Takuya, almost imperceptibly."

A.D.M.S. with its branching timelines was praised as genius by Nintendo Life and RPG Site, with Nintendo World Report calling it "still an impressive gameplay system two decades after its creation". Pelit embraced the challenge brought by the gameplay and described it as not only as nostalgically cruel for its item management but also immersive, "as if it was the player themself who was learning the logic of time-jumping and not only Takuya". RPGFan was grateful for a hint system introduced in the remake remedying the need of "wild goose chases" to find the next trigger to advance the plot. Digitally Downloaded found the requirement of repeatedly checking hotspots in a scene to advance an unnecessary chore. Other than the cursor at all times locking onto interactable areas and the tedium of skipping text in familiar parts, RPG Site had little to complain about the gameplay.

The English translation received complaints of stiltedness and awkwardness from RPG Site and RPGFan, the former at times being baffled by incomprehensible passages. RPGFan noticed that concepts were localised inconsistently throughout, such as whether yen or dollars were used as currency.

The remake's artwork had in Nintendo Life's opinion a "standard, generic low-budget anime look" and less atmosphere compared to the original PC-98 designs. However, Digitally Downloaded called the visuals "gorgeous" and admired how "every scene, character, and environment drips with carefully constructed atmosphere", especially in a lengthy 30-hour game requiring a lot of art and design. Both Digitally Downloaded and RPG Site wished there was an option for the original art.

== Legacy ==
At Hardcore Gaming 101, Audun Sorlie wrote that Yu-no helped revolutionize the visual novel genre, particularly with the A.D.M.S., which was touted as "revolutionary" at the time. At Gamasutra, Sorlie wrote that eroge audiences soon began demanding large-scope plotlines and musical scores of similar quality and ambition to that of Yu-no's, and that companies responded by hiring talent: "The genre became an all-new arena for young artists and musicians once again, with companies willing to take chances on fresh blood; the market thrived with the excitement and the risks that were being taken, and became a hotbed of creativity". Per Anime News Network, Yu-no is "considered one of the most beloved narrative games in Japan, and its system of parallel storylines had a profound influence on storytelling in visual novels in the years since its original release." Kurt Kalata gave the use of timeline divergence in Steins;Gate as an example of Yu-no's concepts impacting visual novels. According to RPG Site, Yu-no influenced later visual novels such as Fate/stay night and Steins;Gate.

According to ITmedia, the influence of Yu-no goes beyond visual novels and extends to modern otaku, manga and anime works. The mangaka Tamiki Wakaki, for example, has cited Yu-no as an influence on the manga and anime series, The World God Only Knows. Other visual novel and manga authors who cited Yu-no as an influence include Romeo Tanaka, Poyoyon Rock, Key founder Jun Maeda (known for titles such as Kanon, Clannad and Angel Beats), Type-Moon's Hikaru Sakurai, White Album 2 and Saekano author Fumiaki Maruto, and To Heart author Toru Minazuki. Maeda credits Yu-no as one of the pioneering nakige ("crying game") which Key's own such games were modeled after.

Many English media outlets perceived Yu-no as influential when discussing its remake or anime adaptation in 2019. Anime News Network said it "was incredibly popular for its time and likely inspired a lot of media after its release" and they noted its premise is "adjacent to Steins;Gate." Nintendo World Report held it as having paved the way for multiple successful visual novels, and Digitally Downloaded described how the branching timeline system is considered influential by having increased visual novels' narrative arc variety. Nintendo Life stated that "the modern visual novel genre would simply not exist without" Yu-no.

Japanese philosopher Hiroki Azuma discusses Yu-no in his 2001 book Otaku: Japan's Database Animals. He describes a "double-layer" of consumption, where not only otaku engage with the drama of individual works, but said works also become mere "simulacra" remixed from their elements (such as moe tropes or game assets) which form a collective element "database" to consume. He views that since Yu-no has a dual story structure – with on one hand the separate narratives per girl ("level of the simulacra") assembled onscreen by the game "system", and movement between story branches to collect items ("level of the database") on the other – the timeline map makes the system behind the drama and hence such dual consumption, in part, visible. As such, with protagonist Takuya existing at both of these levels simultaneously, Azuma argues Yu-no becomes an exemplar of postmodernism. Further analysing the game, Azuma associates the splitting of timelines with splitting of the mind after the loss of the Father, and in turn associates that with the loss of a grand narrative (a society's unified worldview) leading to smaller narratives coexisting. Azuma in his final comments sees Yu-no as "a work constructed with extreme care".

== Adaptations ==
=== Anime ===
Pink Pineapple produced and released a four-episode hentai anime original video animation series during 1998–1999. The anime had multiple changes from the original game such as cutting multiple characters and adding characters from the A.D.M.S. section into the Epilogue.

Key visual of the 2019 anime series, which uses Ryō Nagi's redesigns. Clockwise, from bottom left: Kaori Asakura, Ayumi Arima, Kanna Hatano, Kōzō Ryūzōji, Mio Shimazu, Eriko Takeda and Mitsuki Ichijō. Centre: Takuya Arima.

A new, 26-episode anime adaptation began airing on April 2, 2019, for half a year. Announced in 2016, it was produced by Feel in collaboration with MAGES and Genco and was broadcast on AT-X, Tokyo MX, ABC, and BS Fuji, with Crunchyroll and Funimation streaming outside Japan with an additional English dub. The anime is directed by Tetsuo Hirakawa, and the characters are designed by Mai Otsuka. Kazuya Tanaka is the sound director, and Keishi Yonao and Ryu Takami were assigned to compose the series's music. Asaka performed the series's opening theme song Kono Yo no Hate de Koi o Utau Shojo (この世の果てで恋を唄う少女, Kono Yo no Hate de Koi o Utau Shōjo), while Konomi Suzuki performed the series's ending theme song Shinri no Kagami, Tsurugi no Yō ni (真理の鏡、剣乃ように, Shinri no Kagami, Tsurugi no Yō ni) Suzuki performed the series's second opening theme song "MOTHER", while Asaka performed the series's second ending theme song Kami no Sūshiki (神の数式, Kami no Sūshiki).

Hirakawa said the anime would include all characters and routes from the original game. Unlike the game's first-person perspective from protagonist Takuya's point of view, the anime was declared to depict the relationships of the girls surrounding Takuya. Hirakawa also said the anime would "outdo the game in dirty jokes", that Mio would "be even more tsundere", and that Kanna would "be even more mysterious".

A new episode was bundled with the series's third Blu-ray volume on December 26, 2019.

=== Episode list ===
==== Episodes (1998) ====
No.	Title	Original release date
1	"The Spectacle of Seduction"; Transliteration: "Yūwaku suru Jishōtachi" (Japanese: 誘惑する事象たち)	October 23, 1998
2	"The Concerto of Strange Incontinuity"; Transliteration: "Furenzokutai no Koncheruto" (Japanese: 不連続体のコンチェルト)	January 22, 1999
3	"The Cinderella of the Junction"; Transliteration: "Bunkiten no Shinderera" (Japanese: 分岐点のシンデレラ)	June 25, 1999
4	"The Goddess Sings at the Edge of the World"; Transliteration: "Sekai no Hate de Megami wa Utau" (Japanese: 世界の果てで女神は唄う)	September 24, 1999

==== Episodes (2019) ====
No.	Title	Original release date
1	"You Know?"; Transliteration: "You Know?" (Japanese: You Know?)	April 2, 2019
2	"Parallel World Constitutive Theorem"; Transliteration: "Heiretsu Sekai Kōsei Genri" (Japanese: 並列世界構成原理)	April 9, 2019
3	"Tears That Can't Be Stopped"; Transliteration: "Tomerarenai Namida" (Japanese: 止められない涙)	April 16, 2019
4	"Dirtied White Skin"; Transliteration: "Kegasareta Shiroi Hada" (Japanese: 穢された白い肌)	April 23, 2019
5	"Spiral of Tragedy"; Transliteration: "Higeki no Rasen" (Japanese: 悲劇の螺旋)	April 30, 2019
6	"Beyond a Pale Light"; Transliteration: "Aojiroki Hikari no Kanata ni" (Japanese: 青白き光の彼方に)	May 7, 2019
7	"The Cause of the Curse"; Transliteration: "Tatari Sōdō no Genkyō" (Japanese: タタリ騒動の元凶)	May 14, 2019
8	"The Swallows and Sparrows Know Not"; Transliteration: "Enjaku Izukunzo" (Japanese: 燕雀いずくんぞ)	May 21, 2019
9	"The Distance Between Him and Her"; Transliteration: "Kare to Kanojo no Kyori" (Japanese: 彼と彼女の距離)	May 28, 2019
10	"Feelings Overlapping"; Transliteration: "Kasanaru Omoi" (Japanese: 重なる想い)	June 4, 2019
11	"That Kiss, Once More"; Transliteration: "Mō Ichido Ano Kisu o" (Japanese: もう一度あのキスを)	June 11, 2019
12	"The Secret Under the White Coat"; Transliteration: "Hakui no Shita no Himitsu" (Japanese: 白衣の下の秘密)	June 18, 2019
13	"An Ordained Fate"; Transliteration: "Sadamerareta Unmei" (Japanese: 定められた運命)	June 25, 2019
14	"The Transfer Student's Friend"; Transliteration: "Tenkōsei no Otomodachi" (Japanese: 転校生のお友達)	July 2, 2019
15	"A Summer That Won't Come Back"; Transliteration: "Modoranai Natsu" (Japanese: 戻らない夏)	July 9, 2019
16	"Inside Unmoving Time"; Transliteration: "Ugokanai Toki no Naka de" (Japanese: 動かない時の中で)	July 16, 2019
17	"A Pale Ephemeral Vow"; Transliteration: "Aoku Hakanaki Chikai" (Japanese: 青く儚き誓い)	July 23, 2019
SP	Transliteration: "Shinjitsu wa Heiretsu Sekai no Hate ni ~Aratanaru Tabidachi e~" (Japanese: 真実は並列世界の果てに～新たなる旅立ちへ～)	July 30, 2019
18	"Twilight in Dela Granto"; Transliteration: "Dera Guranto no Tasogare" (Japanese: デラ=グラントの黄昏)	August 6, 2019
19	"The Bond Between Parent and Child"; Transliteration: "Oyako no Kizuna" (Japanese: 親子の絆)	August 13, 2019
20	"Into the Rafaelo Desert"; Transliteration: "Rafaero Sabaku e" (Japanese: ラファエロ砂漠へ)	August 20, 2019
21	"The Quarry Where Demons Rule"; Transliteration: "Akuma no Shihai Suru Saikutsujō" (Japanese: 悪魔の支配する採掘場)	August 27, 2019
22	"Escape from the Quarry"; Transliteration: "Saikutsujō kara no Dasshutsu" (Japanese: 採掘場からの脱出)	September 3, 2019
23	"The Imperial City, Where the Wind Blows"; Transliteration: "Kaze no Fuku Teito" (Japanese: 風の吹く帝都)	September 10, 2019
24	"The Truth of Dela Granto"; Transliteration: "Dera Guranto no Shinjitsu" (Japanese: デラ=グラントの真実)	September 17, 2019
25	"The Promised Ritual"; Transliteration: "Yakusoku no Gishiki" (Japanese: 約束の儀式)	September 24, 2019
26	"A Girl Who Chants Love at the Bound of This World"; Transliteration: "Kono Yo no Hate de Koi o Utau Shōjo" (Japanese: この世の果てで恋を唄う少女)	October 1, 2019
26.5 (OVA)	"Infinite Parallel Worlds"; Transliteration: "Mugen no Heiretsu Sekai" (Japanese: 無限の並列世界)	December 26, 2019

=== Manga ===
A manga adaptation by Mario Kaneda was published in Enix's G Fantasy magazine from 1997 to 1998. A manga adaptation by Sōji Ishida ran in Enterbrain's Comic Clear magazine from March 14, 2017, to March 15, 2018.

== See also ==
- Crying Out Love, In the Center of the World
