= Otaku: Japan's Database Animals =

2001 nonfiction book

- Author: Hiroki Azuma
- Original title: Dōbutsuka-suru Postmodern: Otaku kara mita Nihon Shakai
- Translators: Jonathan E. Abel; Shion Kono
- Language: Japanese
- Publication date: 2001
- Publication place: Japan
- English publication date: March 25, 2009
- Media type: Print (hardcover)
- Pages: 144
- ISBN: 978-0-8166-5352-2
- OCLC: 977625625

Otaku: Japan's Database Animals (Japanese: 動物化するポストモダン：オタクから見た日本社会, Hepburn: Dōbutsuka-suru Postmodern: Otaku kara mita Nihon Shakai) is a nonfiction essay that relates otaku culture to postmodernism. It was published by Hiroki Azuma in 2001, and translated into English by the University of Minnesota Press in 2009. Azuma released a sequel in March 2007 titled Birth of Game-like Realism: Japan's Database Animals II (ゲーム的リアリズムの誕生~動物化するポストモダン2).

== Summary ==
The work combines Eiji Ōtsuka's concept of narrative consumption (Japanese: 物語消費, romanized: monogatari shōhi, lit. 'story consumption') with Azuma's derivative concept of database consumption, (Japanese: データベース消費, romanized: dētabēsu shōhi) whereby the consumers of media ingest and categorize certain elements of a narrative in parts in an "animalistic" nature, behaving almost like a human relational database. Azuma observes the decline of a grand narrative, replaced by an elevated "importance placed on fiction", another shared characteristic of postmodernity.

Azuma references postmodernist Jean Baudrillard in framing otaku-produced derivative works that emerge from dōjin circles as simulacra. He notes the way in which derivatives are sometimes regarded by otaku as on the same playing field as the original content, and how creators of original otaku media may shift to and from the creation of derivatives.

=== Exploration of otaku media ===
Japan's Database Animals describes the construction of Neon Genesis Evangelion as a pivotal turning point in otaku history, a shift from narrative consumption as seen across the Gundam metanarrative to database consumption of fan-created Evangelion doujinshi. It also explores the character designs of Di Gi Charat as a hyperreal grafting of 'databased' 90's "moe-elements". Azuma is also concerned with the way Japanese pseudohistory and aesthetic culture is depicted in otaku contents, from the artificial Edo of Saber Marionette J to the depictions of characters in miko uniforms like Sailor Mars from Sailor Moon and Sakura from Urusei Yatsura. Azuma considers the works in traditional mediums of Japanese artist Takashi Murakami to be the output of a database outsider, disregarding certain otaku touchstones to create something similar but distinct.

Bishōjo games Kizuato and Air are used to show an otaku intimacy with a more literal database of character sprites, music, background, and text which come together to display a narrative with multiple literal layers. This world of layers is later regarded in terms of the way HTML displays hyperflat web content while abstracting away an invisible layer of complexity. Azuma is also interested in exploring the diverging parallel worlds of the visual novel Yu-no as an example of otaku media that uses postmodern themes to great effect, and considers how its readers must digest its mechanics and narrative at the same time.

== Critical reception ==
Tania Darlington writing for the University of Florida's ImageTexT found that while some illustrations were lackluster, students interested in otaku studies 'owe a debt' to translators Abel and Kono for bringing the original to an English audience. She also remarks on Azuma's focus of visual novels over more expected works of anime and manga.

Ed Sizemore for Comics Worth Reading noted the choice to preserve Japanese name order as a bit confusing when placed directly next to Western names. Sizemore relates Azuma's concepts to the fandom of American cultural products surrounded by metanarrative such as Star Wars and superhero comics, and spoke positively of Azuma's analyses of Saber Marionette J, Di GI Charat, Murakami, and visual novels.

Timothy Iles writing for the Electronic Journal for Contemporary Japanese Studies called Azuma's databases "an extremely useful model with which to comprehend postmodernity" and complemented the text of the translation and choice not to 'over-translate'.

In 2011, Mark McHarry wrote about Japan's Database Animals for the journal Intersections: Gender and Sexuality in Asia and the Pacific published by Australia National University with a focus on Azuma's exploration of the treatment of gender in otaku culture, boys' love, and the male otaku attraction to shōjo.

== See also ==
- Narrative consumption
- Database consumption
- Participatory culture
- Fan labor
- Doujinshi
- Superflat
- Simulacrum
- Postmodernism
- Otaku
