= Lionel Cruet =

Puerto Rican artist

Lionel Cruet (born 1989 in San Juan, Puerto Rico) is an audiovisual and geopolitical artist whose work is focused on intimate relationships with the environment.

== Early life and education ==
Lionel Cruet was born in 1989 in San Juan, Puerto Rico, where he developed an interest in visual arts, influenced by his proximity to the islands costal landscapes. In third grade, his art teacher Mayra Aguilar, recognized his talent and encouraged him to pursue extracurricular art programs, which helped his artistic skills. Mentors such as Daniel Lind Ramos, Rosa Irigoyen, Zilla Sánchez, and Dhara Rivera further nurtured his artistic development. He received a Bachelor in Fine Arts in image and design from La Escuela de Artes Plásticas Puerto Rico in 2011, where he engaged with fine arts and critical discussions on visual design. He completed a Master in Fine Arts degree from The City College of New York, focusing on digital media performance and site-specific art in 2014, and a Masters in Education from the College of Saint Rose. His education across Puerto Rico and New York shaped his multidisciplinary approach, blending ecology, geopolitics, and technology in his work.

As a child in San Juan, Puerto Rico, Lionel Cruet was captivated by the vibrant colors and dynamic ecosystems of the island's beaches, which sparked his lifelong fascination with environmental themes. Raised in a culturally rich environment, Lionel Cruet was exposed to Puerto Rican traditions and histories that later informed his artistic explorations of identity and geopolitics. His early engagement with local art communities, including workshops at community centers, fostered a sense of discipline and experimentation, laying the groundwork for his multidisciplinary practice.

== Career and art ==
Lionel Cruet's artworks expresses ideas of nature and its threats due to global warming, pollution, climate change and colonization. His art got scholarly acknowledgment as it addresses hurricanes and the environment globally and in Puerto Rico Other scholarly acknowledgment include the aspects of patterns in art.

He exhibited his first individual exhibition in Puerto Rico, "Lionel Cruet: Rhetoric of an uncertain future"

Through drawings and animations of sea turtles, sea crabs, the artist depicts a transmedia ecosystem of creatures. A key component of the artist's approach to the natural environment is the use of digital media video projections and sound.

Previous exhibitions include Lionel Cruet: In Between, Real and Digital at the Bronx River Art Center where traditional elements like unfinished canvas are merged with video projections that depict water and other natural occurrences in Cruet's interactive installations. Interactions between the actual world and the virtual world exceed their respective borders. Between and within at the EFA Project Space Program, Eco Urgency: Now or Never, Wave Hill and Seen and Heard, Everson Museum of Art in Syracuse, New York.

== Awards and recognition ==
Following are a few notable awards and recognition to mention.

- Juan Downey Audiovisual Award winner
- Received fellowship for the Socrates Sculpture Park in New York City
- Selected as fellow of The Laundromat Project
- US Latinx Art Forum, grant recipient
- Selected as participant at ICA Institute of Contemporary Art Miami
