= Database consumption =

Method of media consumption

Database consumption (Japanese: データベース消費, romanized: dētabēsu shōhi) refers to a way of content consumption in which people do not consume a narrative itself, nor fragments of it, but rather its constituent elements. The concept was coined by the Japanese critic Hiroki Azuma in the early 2000s to describe how characters and mechanics found in a narrative's "database" are demanded and consumed by fans without trying to compensate for the absence of an encompassing grand narrative, in a manner dependent on personal interpretations. Azuma cites the change in consumption patterns of Japanese otaku content since the late 1990s as a major example of "database consumption", during which the "control" over a franchise shifted from the authors and manufacturers to the fans. Satoshi Maejima suggests that narratives that end inconclusively force fans to turn to database consumption and to "character moe", in which the characters of a franchise become the direct targets of fan affection. Azuma compares this affection to drug addiction and calls it "animalization".

The rise of the "slice of life" and isekai genres in the later half of the 2000s has been attributed to database consumption. Hatsune Miku, a fictional character featured in a speech synthesis software who possesses no narrative, is singled out by Azuma as "the exact form of database consumption". Outside of otaku culture, aspects of database consumption have been found in youth culture more broadly, in the consumption patterns of music and internet memes. Azuma himself cites the cataloguing of visual effects in Hollywood films as an example. Tsunehiro Uno argues that the grand narrative has become "defunct" and is being compensated for with expanding plots. Huei Wen-Lo cites the Pokémon franchise as a "database multiverse", where characters, rules and attributes are endlessly recombined.

Some scholars like Thomas Lamarre have questioned Azuma's use of the database as the model for this kind of consumption, and others find that Azuma presents no precise description of how this database comes into existence. Paul Perdijk argues that the database is constructed socially and is not merely an isolating "animalization". Forrest Greenwood finds Azuma's works to suffer from a market-driven approach to analysis and an excessive focus on the male otaku, claiming that Azuma downplays gender differences when analyzing consumption patterns.

== Overview ==
The background to Azuma's presentation of this theory is the concept of narrative consumption by the critic and writer Eiji Ōtsuka.

In his A Theory of Narrative Consumption, Ōtsuka cites franchises like Bikkuriman stickers and Sylvanian Families as examples, pointing out that people are not consuming the items but the "grand narratives" (大きな物語, 'big story', worldviews and setting) behind them. He called the paradigm of consumption mainly found since the 1980s "narrative consumption". It is also referred to as "worldview consumption" (世界観消費) to avoid the ambiguity of "narrative" which specifically means "grand narrative (worldview and setting)" in this theory. (Note: Sonoko Azuma used the term "worldview consumption" to describe a specific type of narrative consumption that involves imaging a worldview as a "grand narrative".)

Based on Ōtsuka's work, Azuma replaces "grand narrative (worldview and setting)" in the theory of narrative consumption with "grand non-narrative (stacks of information)" (大きな非物語（情報の集積）) and uses the term "database consumption" to describe the new paradigm of consuming a huge "database" shared within a community. This form of consumption is particularly prominent in Japanese otaku culture since the late 1990s.

The new consumption paradigm is closely related to the advent of postmodernism. In essence, otaku culture and the postmodern condition are thought to have the following points in common: 1) As stated by Jean Baudrillard, it is no longer possible to distinguish between the original and the simulated, and thereby the in-between simulacra prevail in hyperreality, which parallels the difficulty to distinguish derivative works and media mix from the original works in otaku culture; 2) Jean-François Lyotard defined postmodernism as the decline of grand narratives (norms shared by society as a whole) and the emergence of many localized, little narratives (norms shared only within small communities), which corresponds to otaku culture's unique value norm that the fictional world rather than the real world is paid more attention to.

While narrative consumption could be seen as fabricating pseudo-"grand narratives" with worldviews behind works to compensate for the lost grand narrative (partial postmodernism), in database consumption, however, even fabrication is abandoned (full postmodernism). Therefore, in (full) postmodern otaku culture, by accessing the database (stacks of information) that varies depending on personal interpretations, various settings are extracted by different people to create different original and derivative works (indistinguishable between originals and copies).

In Lacanian terminology, "grand narrative" could be seen as "the Symbolic", "little narrative" as "the Imaginary", and the "database" as "the Real". However, psychiatrist Tamaki Saito, while acknowledging such correspondence is understandable as a metaphor, believes the equivalent to the database should be more appropriately the Symbolic, stating that it is the autonomous Symbolic that promotes the "genesis of characters". The "database turn" of the world can be considered a manifestation of postmodernization in the cultural aspect (shift towards database consumption), globalization in the economic aspect, and the digitalization in the technological aspect.

Azuma did not mention which type of database is involved in database consumption. Informatics engineering expert Naohiko Yamaguchi and art critic Takemi Kuresawa believe the concept corresponds to a relational database.

=== Otaku culture ===
This image of Wikipe-tan consists of visual signs (moe-elements) such as cat ears, a maid outfit and a tail.

As mentioned above, Azuma cites how Japanese otaku content has been consumed since the late 1990s as a major example of database consumption.

For example, the shift of fan consumption patterns from Mobile Suit Gundam (since 1979) to Neon Genesis Evangelion (since 1995) suggests a departure from narrative consumption. In Gundam, different series were set in the same fictitious history (Universal Century, etc.), and fans enthusiastically scrutinized that fictitious history (grand narrative). Evangelion fans, however, tend not to immerse themselves in the world of the work, but rather to devote themselves to doujinshi (self-published derivative works) that feature the heroines and model figures of the mechanics in the series. Rather than the worldview, stacks of information (grand non-narrative) including characters and mechanics are demanded and consumed. According to Satoshi Maejima, a Japanese critic, despite many meaningful keywords (Human Instrumentality Project, S^{2} Engine, etc.) that seem to hint at the worldview of the work (which fits the concept of narrative consumption) in the first half of Evangelion, the work eventually came to an end without revealing the truth, and the audience was therefore forced to change their attitude of consuming the story. This change in consumption patterns that began in 1995 (the shift to so-called "character moe") can be considered a shift from manufacturer-led to consumer-led, and the background was the consumer base shifted from otaku students of liberal arts (who prefer stories) to those of engineering (who prefers systems).

In 1998, Di Gi Charat characters were designed as Broccoli's image character (mascot) without a background story. Nonetheless, they surprisingly became a hit and were adapted into different media franchises, including anime and video games, ultimately ending up having a background story. Characters in Di Gi Charat were designed by assembling moe elements like ahoge and bells, making them a good example of "moe-element database" consumption (Other examples of combinations of moe elements can be seen in mainstream culture. For example, the same argument can be applied to the costumes of the idol group Mini-Moni.) In this way, otaku have developed a spinal reflex reaction to symbols of their favorite moe elements as though they are drug addicts. (Or, more generally, they only have self-contained desire-fulfillment circuits without mediating the desires of the others.) Hiroki Azuma borrows the expression of Alexandre Kojève and calls this development "animalization". (Note: The concept "animalization" is frequently compared to George Ritzer's concept of McDonaldization (excessive emphasis on rationality and computability). It is also sometimes compared to Zolaism.) In database consumption, characters like Di Gi Charat and Binchotan born without a story in the background may be given ones later on or become the subjects of derivative creations. Such human characters (typically young girls) designed as representations of non-humans can be called moe anthropomorphism. Hatsune Miku, the image character of a speech synthesis software package released in 2007, despite lacking a narrative, gained high popularity due to her unique characteristics and has since been widely used in various derivative creations. Hiroki Azuma describes this as the "exact form of database consumption". While Hatsune Miku's success was mainly based on the video-sharing platform Niconico, the cyberspace of the website, which is filled with a plethora of MAD movies (videos made by splicing together anime clips; anime music video), is made possible as a result of the establishment of database consumption.

Bishōjo games that became popular in otaku culture after the late 1990s are also thought to reflect postmodern database consumption due to their structure. (Note: The A.D.M.S. in YU-NO: A Girl Who Chants Love at the Bound of this World is an example of effective use of postmodernist philosophy.)

In Japanese manga and anime, as manga critic Kō Itō points out, there exists a phenomenon that characters maintain their identities even when removed from their original context and placed in a different environment (e.g., secondary creations). He called the phenomenon "autonomization of characters" (キャラクターの自律化). (Note: Since Itō himself distinguishes between "characters" (キャラクター) that have a presence within the story and "chara" (キャラ) that are removed from the work, it could be called "autonomization of charas" (キャラの自律化) in his words.) In a way, a "character database", not the narrative, has become the object of consumption. Light novels, which have attracted attention since the early 2000s, encompass various genres including science fiction, fantasy, and detective fiction, and are often considered difficult to define; However, by focusing on their crucial element–character design–we can use the keyword "database consumption" to define them as "novels written within the environment of a character database".

In the latter half of the 2000s, works featuring "moe" characters with appealing charms and regressed narratives have gained increasing popularity, particularly triggered by the success of TV anime Lucky Star. These works, commonly referred to as "slice of life" (日常系, nichijō-kei, 'daily genre'), are media content that precisely fits into the database consumption model.

Shūji Nomaguchi mentioned that what is being done in the creation of isekai works (なろう系, narō-kei, 'let's-become genre') that hit the same era of the 2010s corresponds to this. He believes the clichéd narō-kei story is part of what Azuma calls the "invisible database", and these works are created through accessing an intangible "narō-kei database" and selecting elements to be used in their settings.

In the world of contemporary art, there are examples of incorporating elements of otaku culture into artworks such as those of Takashi Murakami and Chaos*Lounge. Murakami's works receive polarized responses: they are highly regarded in the contemporary art world, yet heavily criticized by otaku. This can be explained by how the database (substratum) and the simulacra (superstratum) are understood differently, according to Azuma. Murakami employs the technique of purifying the designs (simulacra) that represent otaku culture and incorporates them into his works. But this is only appreciated in modern art criticism which sees the production of simulacra as "a weapon for constructing the avant-garde"; It cannot be understood by otaku whose consumption is based on a database of moe elements because that important database is missing. Chaos*Lounge, a contemporary art group, creates many works based on existing characters and also cites Azuma's theory of character moe and database consumption as their theoretical background to ensure criticality.

=== Non-otaku culture ===
Azuma argues that even outside of otaku culture, the behavior patterns of burusera girls and compensated dating girls, who were the subject of sociologist Shinji Miyadai's fieldwork, are following a path of transition from narrative consumption to database consumption. He also points out that Miyadai's "synchronized communication" found in street youth shares similarities to otaku's animalization.

Some also linked techniques like sampling and remixing used in music genres like hip hop and techno-pop to the database consumption model. DJs collect and reconfigure musical elements that make up original songs as materials to create derivative creations, which is considered paralleling to secondary creations like doujinshi published by otaku; Some also compared between "anime eyes" who enjoy moe elements in visual symbols to "techno ears" who enjoy repetitive techno melodies. However, Satoshi Masuda, an expert in music theory and media studies, points out that there are two differences in the database-like consumption of these cultures. First, in otaku culture, fan creations are based on the principle of the autonomy of characters, while in DJ culture, it is unlikely that musical elements can retain their meanings and be consumed alone while extracted from the original song. Second, in DJ culture, the reconstruction of musical elements is done at a superficial level (mechanical copying of data), but in otaku culture, fan creation activities often involve character settings absent from original works. (Note: That said, in otaku culture, fan creations may also involve mechanical copying such as MAD movies.) In addition, DJ culture in the 1990s typically consider songs' historical contexts while selecting music clips, making it temporal context-dependent, so some people believe there is a clear distinction between DJ culture and otaku's database consumption.

Hiroyuki Aihara, a picture book author, exemplifies database consumption with iPod, blogs, and select stores (stores that sell selected items from different brands). When songs are recorded in an album, they exist within the unity of the album's worldview: but when individually downloaded to an iPod, re-organized, and listened to, the unity (grand narrative) collapses. Likewise, a blog is flat, lacking a hierarchical structure commonly found in conventional websites, and a select shop displays and sells products, ignoring the unity (grand narratives) of brands. On the Internet, in addition to blogs, "meme communication" (ネタ的コミュニケーション) (Note: A term coined by sociologist Kensuke Suzuki. It is a communication style commonly seen in posts on 2channel, where one references previous comments and reacts as if they are memes (ネタ, neta). Sociologist Akihiro Kitada's definition of the "sociality of connections" (つながりの社会性) has almost the same meaning.) found on the online forum 2channel is similar to database consumption in that copy-paste, ASCII art, etc. can be regarded as components of a database.

Takayuki Okai, who specializes in media studies and sociology, refers to Hiroki Azuma's argument and contrasts that professional wrestling fans are narrative-consuming, but mixed martial arts fans are database-consuming.

There are also observations that the behavior of "characterizing" oneself, typically among young people in Japan, also refers to different types of characters that appear in pop culture, as in the database consumption theory.

As for non-Japanese culture, examples include that professional performers in the American TV drama series Glee covering famous songs of previous American stars is database-consuming. In this case, the US differs from Japan in that songs rather than characters are the object of this type of consumption. Hiroki Azuma himself cites the situation in Hollywood movies, where highly advanced visual effects are often paired with clichéd set patterns, as an example of database consumption outside of Japan. Huei Wen-Lo compares the cinematic multiverse with a "database multiverse" found in the Pokémon franchise, organized around "an expandable repository of characters, attributes, and rules that can be endlessly recombined".

== Counterexamples ==
Sociologist Shinji Miyadai and writer Hiroyuki Kagami argue that the database consumption model cannot explain the popularity of mobile phone novel series, including Koizora which was a huge boom in 2006 and 2007. On the other hand, critic Tsunehiro Uno says that in a society where database consumption has become ubiquitous, the national function of "literary style" (grand narrative) has since defunct and is now compensated for by expanding plots. Whether it be the light novel boom, the mobile phone novel boom, or the practical-book-like novel boom, (Note: Practical-book-like novels (実用書的小説) are those released in novel packages but are in fact practical books. Examples include Natsumi Iwasakii's Moshidora and Takafumi Horie's 拝金 (Worshipping Money) and 成金 (Becoming Rich).) what matters is not the content of the text itself, but how efficiently it allows access to the background database. Satoshi Hamano, a critic and sociologist, draws parallels between the "deep emotion" frequently mentioned by mobile phone novel fans and animalized otaku's "moe" in database consumption theory by Azuma.

== Analysis ==
Thomas Lamarre explores database consumption in detail in his 2009 book The Anime Machine, arguing that a "distributive field" is a more suitable metaphor than a database when referring to the loss of hierarchy and the loss of a sense of center and periphery in anime, and that the database structure is actually "exploded projection". He argues that Azuma "leaps outside" of the database structure when discussing attractive elements in moe, arriving at references to brainwashing and drugging. According to Lamarre, Azuma presents a "two-tiered model" in which the male otaku become both isolated and animalized, yet also socialized and humanized through database consumption.

Writing for Mechademia, Forrest Greenwood criticized Azuma's "excessive periodization", his market-driven approach to critical inquiry, and his downplaying of gender differences in his focus on the male otaku. Greenwood finds these weaknesses in Otaku: Japan's Database Animals and "most of Azuma's works since". Fabian Schäfer and Martin Roth wrote that Azuma "stops short of addressing the questions of how the database is established and structured". Paul Perdijk, an independent scholar writing for the University of Tokyo, argued that there is no database "out there", negating Azuma's references to fan websites which organize elements into databases. He instead argues that the database is socially constructed. Anthropologist Ian Condry argued in the 2013 book The Soul of Anime that the popularization of Dejiko from Di Gi Charat was not individually experienced, but part of a shared affective response which gave the character meaning in a particular time and place.

== See also ==
- Authenticity (philosophy)
- Fan fiction
- Hyperreality
- Participatory culture
- Media mix
- Transformativeness
- Simulacrum
- Superflat

== Bibliography ==
- 大塚英志 (1989). 『物語消費論』 新曜社
- 東浩紀 (2001).『動物化するポストモダン オタクから見た日本社会』 講談社 ISBN 978-4061495753
  - Hiroki Azuma (2009). Otaku: Japan's Database Animals. Translated by Abel, Jonathan E.; Kono, Shion. University of Minnesota Press. ISBN 978-0816653522.
- 東浩紀 (2007). 『ゲーム的リアリズムの誕生~動物化するポストモダン2』 講談社 ISBN 978-4061498839
- 東浩紀 (2003). 「動物化するオタク系文化」『網状言論F改—ポストモダン・オタク・セクシュアリティ 』青土社 ISBN 978-4791760091
