= Narrative consumption =

Japanese media theory

Narrative consumption (Japanese: 物語消費, romanized: monogatari shōhi, lit. 'story consumption') is a media theory created by the Japanese critic Eiji Ōtsuka in his 1989 book A Theory of Narrative Consumption (物語消費論). Ōtsuka developed the theory while working as an editor for Kadokawa. Narrative consumption was a large influence on Hiroki Azuma's theory of otaku and database consumption.

== Overview ==
Narrative consumption involves the relationship between "grand narratives" or "worldviews" and "small narratives" or "variations". The concept of worldview or world (sekai), which comes from anime production and kabuki tradition, refers to the entire world or setting of a work of fiction. Each individual story told within that universe (such as an episode or even a season of television) is a small narrative, or a variation of the worldview.

In his book, Ōtsuka examines the way children consumed Bikkuriman Chocolates, which came with stickers featuring a character. The stickers were the primary commodity: children would throw the chocolate out and keep the sticker. Ōtsuka argues that each sticker, with its character, contained a fragment of a larger narrative. Children collected these stickers (small narratives) in order to consume more of the grand narrative.

Ōtsuka also writes about otaku subculture and how the creation of dōjinshi fits into this paradigm. According to Ōtsuka, multiple small narratives can exist within the grand narrative. In kabuki theatre, multiple variations of the same narrative setting are common. He finds a similar pattern in Japanese fan subcultures, where fans create dōjinshi containing unofficial stories set within the world of an established media work. Ōtsuka argues that once the fans consumed the official narrative, they were able to make their own variations from the worldview referenced by the original work. However, because both the original story and the fan-created stories are small narratives set within the grand narrative, they are equally valid.

== Impact ==
The philosopher Hiroki Azuma was heavily influenced by narrative consumption when writing Otaku: Japan's Database Animals. Azuma argues that narrative consumption has been replaced by database consumption, a new paradigm of media consumption. Azuma's use of narrative consumption in his work sparked renewed interest in the theory, which led to a second edition of Ōtsuka's book in 2001. Marc Steinberg writes that Azuma helped narrative consumption gain "canonical status within manga and anime criticism".

== See also ==
- Media mix
- Transformative work
- Fanfiction
- Participatory culture
- Simulacrum
