= Hiroyuki Kanno (game designer) =

Japanese video game writer and designer

- 菅野 洋之(Kanno Hiroyuki)
- Born: May 8, 1968; Tokyo, Japan
- Died: December 19, 2011 (aged 43); Bunkyō, Tokyo, Japan
- Other names: Yukihiro Kenno (剣乃 ゆきひろ, Kenno Yukihiro)
- Education: Hosei University

Hiroyuki Kanno (菅野 ひろゆき, 8 May 1968 – 19 December 2011) was a Japanese video game designer who wrote and directed visual novels and eroge adventure games starting in the 1990s. Some of his most well-known games include Desire, EVE Burst Error (at C's Ware) and Yu-no (at ELF Corporation), which had a major influence on the visual novel genre. His games often feature multiple narrative layers, such as different character viewpoints or overlapping mystery story arcs. He was friends with Ryu Umemoto, who often worked closely with him and composed music for the games. In December 1997, he founded Abel corporation and became its CEO. In 2011, Kanno died due to cerebral infarction and brain hemorrhage.

== Games ==
- Desire (1994)
- Xenon: Mugen no Shitai (1994)
- EVE Burst Error (1995)
- Yu-no: A Girl Who Chants Love at the Bound of This World (1996)
- Exodus Guilty (1998)
- Fukagyaku Sekai no Tantei Shinshi (2000)
- Mystereet (2004)

== Legacy ==
According to Anime News Network, Yu-no is "considered one of the most beloved narrative games in Japan, and its system of parallel storylines had a profound influence on storytelling in visual novels in the years since its original release." According to ITmedia, the influence of Kanno, and Yu-no in particular, goes beyond visual novels and extends to modern Otaku works in general. The mangaka Tamiki Wakaki, for example, has cited Yu-no as an influence on the manga and anime series, The World God Only Knows. Other visual novel and manga authors who cited Yu-no as an influence include Romeo Tanaka, Poyoyon Rock, Jun Maeda, Type-Moon's Hikaru Sakurai, White Album 2 and Saekano author Fumiaki Maruto, and To Heart author Toru Minazuki. According to RPG Site, Hiroyuki Kanno's work influenced later visual novels such as Fate/stay night and Steins;Gate.
