= Anime's Media Mix =

2012 book by Marc Steinberg

Anime's Media Mix: Franchising Toys and Characters in Japan is a 2012 book by Marc Steinberg, published by the University of Minnesota Press. The book describes the media mix and media convergence around anime.

== Contents ==
Part I describes media convergence around Astro Boy, which the author referred to as the "tipping point" of media convergence in Japan.

"Limiting Movement, Inventing Anime" is the initial chapter and describes the development of anime, and how pre-anime forms of entertainment like kamishibai helped media mix strategies develop. The marketing around the Astro Boy episode "The Time Machine" is the subject of "Candies, Premiums, and Character Merchandising: The Meiji-Atomu Marketing Campaign," the subsequent chapter. The book describes the chocolate products made by Meiji Co. Using imagery in commercial products is the subject of "Material Communication and the Mass Media Toy," the third chapter.

Part II describes media convergence around Kadokawa Shoten. The fourth chapter, "Media Mixes, Media Transformation," describes how the company used the same marketing strategies in anime with books. The way the fanbase of media alter the dynamic around a media series is explored in "Character, World, Consumption," the fifth chapter. This chapter describes the role of Hello Kitty and analyzes Eiji Ōtsuka's theory "Monogatari shōhiron", meaning "A theory of narrative consumption". It states that people who buy products related to a fandom mainly want the fictional universe created in the story rather than tangible goods, and that fan participation can be driven by fictional events, such as the death of Astro Boy.

The work often notes milestones when something or someone is the first to do something in the topic.

== Reception ==
Hongmei Li, a reviewer, stated that the work has "an accessible argument". Deborah Shamoon of the National University of Singapore wrote that the work is "a carefully researched and important addition" to its field.
