= The Parallax View (book) =

Book by Slavoj Žižek

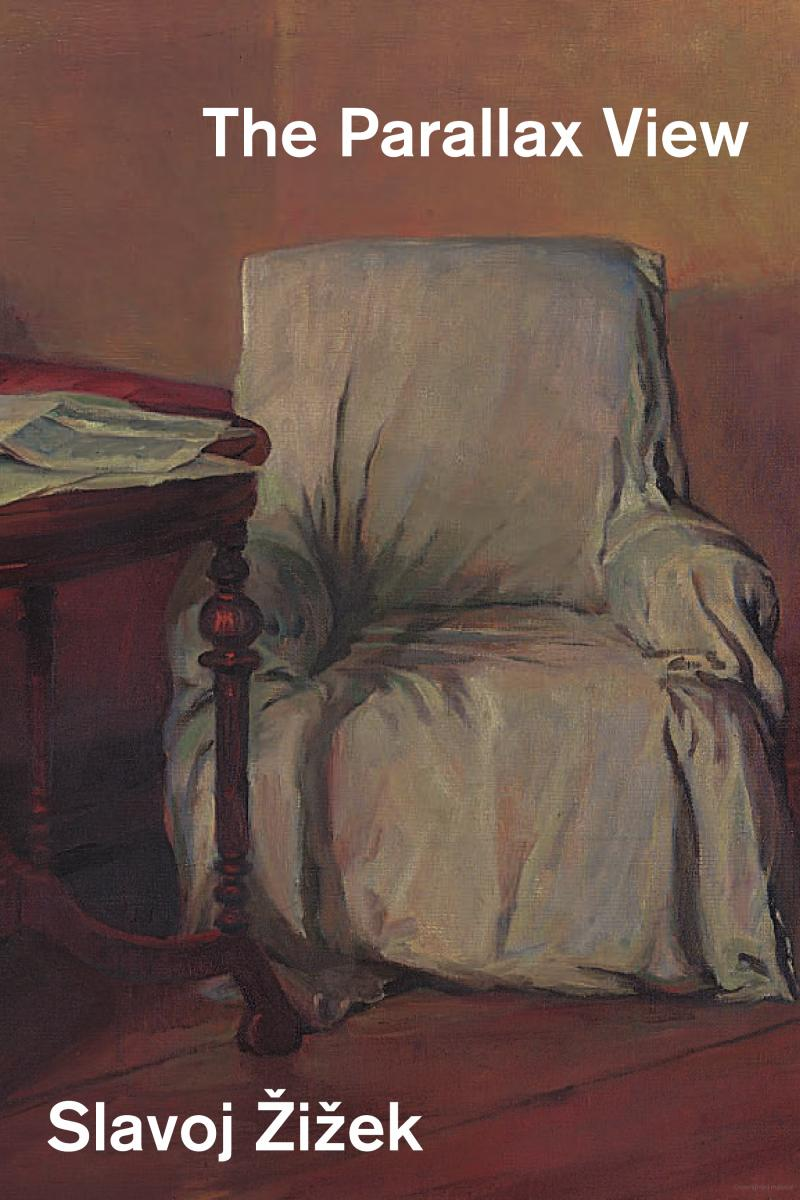
- Cover of the first edition
- Author: Slavoj Žižek
- Cover artist: Grigori Shpolyanski
- Language: English
- Publisher: MIT Press
- Publication date: February 2006 (U.S.)
- Publication place: United States
- Media type: Print (Hardcover and Paperback)
- Pages: 448
- ISBN: 978-0262512688

The Parallax View (2006) is a book by Slovenian philosopher Slavoj Žižek. Like many of Žižek's books, it covers a wide range of topics, including philosophy, psychoanalysis, neuroscience, politics, literature, and film. Some of the authors discussed in detail include Jacques Lacan, Georg Wilhelm Friedrich Hegel, Karl Marx, Immanuel Kant, Martin Heidegger, Alain Badiou, Michael Hardt and Antonio Negri, Daniel Dennett, Antonio Damasio, Franz Kafka, and Henry James.

The book was described by Žižek as his magnum opus, and it is considered notable because Žižek attempts therein to outline his system of thought. According to Žižek's introduction to the book, it is divided into three main sections (philosophical, scientific, and political) in order to introduce "a minimum of conceptual order." Although the book was largely well-received, some questioned whether it truly had a systematic approach.

The most enduring concept developed throughout the book is the parallax, which refers to the different apparent position of an object when it is seen from different perspectives. Žižek uses this idea, which comes from Kojin Karatani's Transcritique, to rework the Hegelian dialectic from a materialist perspective.

== Interpretation ==
=== Parallax ===
A parallax shift refers to the apparent motion of an object when it is seen from different perspectives. Using this notion, Žižek claims that both positions viewing the object are Kantian antinomies, meaning that they are completely incompatible and irreducible ways of seeing something. Fredric Jameson argues that Žižek is after the "absolute incommensurability of the resultant descriptions or theories" of whatever object is discussed. Traditionally, this would be seen as a problem for the Hegelian dialectic, which some interpret as involving thesis and antithesis coming together in a synthesis, rather than remaining entirely opposed. Žižek argues, however, that this is an incorrect view of the dialectic. Instead, Žižek writes, Hegel does not overcome the Kantian division, but rather asserts it as such. The Hegelian synthesis, in other words, is the recognition of the insurmountable gap between two positions. This synthesis can only be achieved through a parallax shift.

=== Ontology ===
Adrian Johnston maintains that Žižek is an "emergent dual-aspect monist." This refers to the belief that, although there is ultimately one substance that makes up the world, it appears divided and refracted into "distinct, disparate attributes." Žižek purports a substance that is constantly "fracturing itself from within so as to produce parallax splits between irreconcilable layers and tiers of existence." In other words, the multiple appears because of a split in the Real. This could be contrasted to the work of Gilles Deleuze and Félix Guattari, who maintain that multiplicity is the "primary ontological fact."

=== Neuroscience ===
In neuroscience, Žižek confronts contemporary theorists like Daniel Dennett and Antonio Damasio in terms of materialism and idealism. According to Johnston, Žižek asserts that although the mental arises from material neuronal processes, it nonetheless "breaks away" from being determined by those processes. In Johnston's words, "the mental phenomena of thought achieve a relatively separate existence apart from the material corporeality serving as the thus-exceeded ontological underbelly of these same phenomena."

=== Politics ===
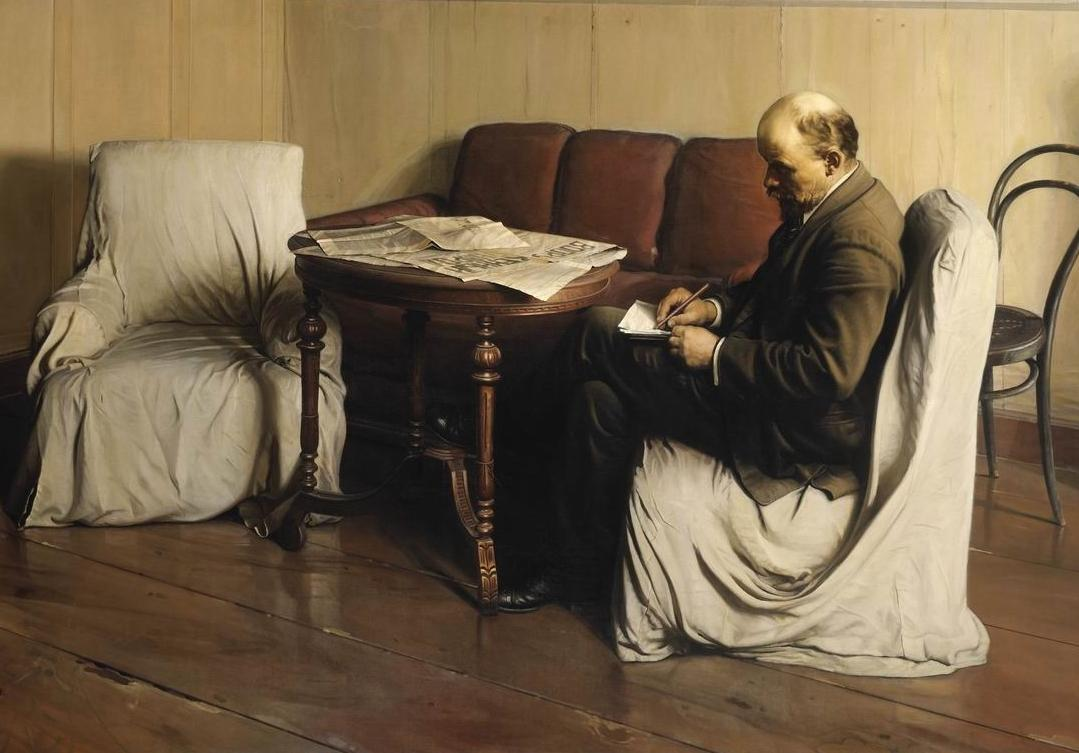
Lenin in Smolny by Isaak Brodsky, from which the book's cover is drawn

Žižek makes two major political points. The first involves a split between the economy and politics. He insists that although the economy is the real area where struggle occurs and that politics is simply a shadow of that, the battle must still be fought in politics. Additionally as the book concludes, he describes Herman Melville's Bartleby as a new key figure in politics; Bartleby's consistently repeated phrase, "I would prefer not to," marks a purely formal refusal that must be adopted politically. According to Jodi Dean, Žižek advocates for a "withdrawal from resistance and from charity... a withdrawal from the whole variety of micropolitical practices..." He offers, ultimately, a political figure of "unbearable, inert, insistent, immobile violence."

=== Psychoanalysis ===
There are a number of Lacanian and psychoanalytic concepts that are reworked throughout the course of the book. The parallax concept, for example, has important implications for Lacan's concept of the Real. Whereas the Real for Lacan meant a hard kernel that resisted symbolization, for Žižek the term refers to the "gap in perspectives." Another concept that Žižek redefines is the superego. According to Jameson, Žižek's revision looks beyond the superego as the "instance of repression and judgment, of taboo and guilt" toward a new definition that states that the superego today has become "something obscene, whose perpetual injunction is: 'Enjoy!'" Whereas the superego was once thought by Freud to prohibit certain activities, today, Žižek argues, it commands people toward the pursuit of pleasure. Jameson claims that the "death drive" is another one of Žižek's persistent fundamental themes. In his revision of the Freudian Thanatos, Žižek suggest that the death drive's true horror is that it lives through us, embodied in life itself. The concept of jouissance also receives a revision; according to Žižek, the envy of the Other's jouissance accounts for "collective violence, racism, nationalism and the like, as much as for the singularities of individual investments, choices and obsessions..." One final and crucial concept in the book involves the Lacanian "gap." According to Jameson, this refers to the doctrine that "the human subjectivity is permanently split and bears a gap within itself, a wound, an inner distance that can never be overcome."

== Reception ==
Dean wrote that, although the book may not necessarily be a magnum opus, as Žižek suggested, it is certainly his best book since The Ticklish Subject, which was published in 1999. Fredric Jameson assessed the book positively, writing that the chapter on cognitive science is a "superb achievement," and that the political lesson of the book is "as indispensable as it is energizing"; he considered these sections to stand as "major statements." He expressed some reservation, however, about the book's style; he claimed that the book functioned as a "theoretical variety show," and that the drawback of such a style is that, at the end, the reader is "perplexed as to the ideas that have been presented, or at least to the major ones to be retained." In a similar vein, Alexei Bogdanov described the book as a "vast battlefield of opinions, where the author's own position is often hard to pinpoint." Johnston also noted this aspect of the book, observing that although the book purports to be systematizing, "certain readers might experience a feeling of frustration in their attempts to discern the systematic unity supposedly underlying and tying together the wide-ranging discussions of the vast amount of diverse content contained in this text." Ultimately, Johnston asserts that there is an "integrated logic/pattern" to the book. Jameson discussed a similar problem and noted that, in theorizing the parallax explicitly, Žižek may have produced a new concept and system, despite the inherently "anti-philosophical" position of the concept.

== Works cited ==
- Bogdanov, Alexei. "The Parallax View by Slavoj Žižek." The Slavic and East European Journal, Vol. 51, No. 4, Special Forum Issue: At the Edge of Heaven: Russian Poetry Since 1970 (Winter 2007), pp. 812–814
- Dean, Jodi. "The Object Next Door." Political Theory, Vol. 35, No. 3 (June 2007), pp. 371–378.
- Jameson, Fredric. "First Impressions". London Review of Books, Vol. 28, No. 17, 7 September 2006, pp. 7–8
- Johnston, Adrian. "Slavoj Žižek's Hegelian Reformation: Giving a Hearing to The Parallax View." Diacritics, Vol. 37, No. 1 (Spring, 2007), pp. 2–20
- Žižek, Slavoj. The Parallax View. Cambridge, Massachusetts: The MIT Press, 2006.
