= Media multiplier =

Effect on consumers in advertising

Media multiplier is a synergistic effect of the increased effectiveness of advertising appearing simultaneously in two or more different media platforms (for example, television and print). The media multiplier theory suggests that consumers exposed to advertising in multiple types of media will be more susceptible to the advertising message.

== See also ==
- Media mix
- media strategy
