= Exodus Guilty =

1998 video game

- Developer: Abel
- Publishers: JP: Imadio; US: Hirameki International
- Designer: Hiroyuki Kanno
- Composers: Ryuichi Sato; Mio Kumamoto
- Platforms: PlayStation, Dreamcast, Windows, DVD player
- Release: JP: 26 November 1998; US: 28 November 2005 (p. 1) 15 September 2006 (p. 2) 10 December 2006 (p. 3)

Exodus Guilty is a 1998 visual novel video game designed by Hiroyuki Kanno. It was released first as a CD game for consoles in Japan, later ported to Windows, and then converted into a DVD game in three parts. The DVD version was released in English by Hirameki International in portions from 2005 to 2006. The story tracks three different eras – the present, past and future – each with its own protagonist.

== Reception ==
Dorimaga's three reviewers scored the Dreamcast version 6/10, 7/10 and 6/10. Famitsu DC's three reviewers gave it 7/10, 8/10 and 7/10.

RPGFan scored parts 1, 2 and 3 of the DVD release 83/100, 82/100 and 85/100 respectively. The same reviewer reviewed the soundtrack, but despite having liked it during the game he found it boring as a standalone listen. Anime News Network gave the first part of the DVD trilogy an F.
