= The Anime Ecology =

2018 reference work by Thomas Lamarre

The Anime Ecology: A Genealogy of Television, Animation, and Game Media
- Author: Thomas Lamarre
- Genre: Reference
- Publisher: University of Minnesota Press
- Publication date: 2018
- Pages: 448
- ISBN: 978-1-4529-5693-0
- OCLC: 1028023054
- Text: The Anime Ecology: A Genealogy of Television, Animation, and Game Media at Project MUSE

The Anime Ecology: A Genealogy of Television, Animation, and Game Media is a 2018 reference work by the animation scholar Thomas Lamarre.
