= R.U.R.U.R. =

2007 video game

R.U.R.U.R.: This Child Shall at Least Receive the Stars
- Cover art for the PC version of the game.
- Developer: light
- Publishers: light (Windows); Views (PSP)
- Composers: Ryu Umemoto; Higuchi Hideki
- Series: R.U.R.U.R.
- Engine: Malie
- Platforms: Windows, PlayStation Portable
- Release: Windows: JP: April 27, 2007; PSP: JP: September 22, 2010
- Genres: Eroge, Visual novel
- Mode: Single-player

R.U.R.U.R.: This Child Shall at Least Receive the Stars (Note: Japanese: ru ru ru ru kono ko no tameni, semete kireina hoshizora wo (ル・ル・ル・ル このこのために、せめてきれいな星空を)) is a Japanese H-game for computer, developed and published by light. The game is known for its use of established science fiction elements in its story, along with numerous references to several works of literature, including Antoine de Saint-Exupéry's The Little Prince and Karel Čapek's R.U.R.

In mid-2008, light announced that a PlayStation 2 port titled R.U.R.U.R.: Petit Prince was in development. However, while a PS2 port never materialized, a port was released for the PlayStation Portable on September 22, 2010. The PlayStation Portable port, R.U.R.U.R: Petit Prince, was handled by light's original staff and added new characters, new event CGs, a new ending for the heroine Benibana, and a new "grand route".

== Story ==
R.U.R.U.R. takes place in the distant future, centuries after humanity has gone extinct. Despite the lack of humans, the spaceship St. Exupéry continues its journey through space with the purpose of finding another planet suitable for colonization. In place of a human society, the robots that once served the humans have created their own societal structure. The story really begins after the discovery of a hidden stasis capsule containing the last human in the universe. While some robots argue that they have taken humanity's place as the dominant race, the leadership decides to awaken the boy inside the capsule to try to raise him in hopes that he would grow to become a suitable leader. In order to do so, several of the robots are conscripted to take part in a fake world created for the boy. A world where he has friends, a loving family, and feels no pain or sorrow.

== Characters ==
Ichihiko (イチヒコ) – The protagonist of the story. He is referred to as "The last mankind" by the robots of the St. Exupéry. He is completely unaware that the world he lives in is fake. Because of how he was raised, he sees the robots around him as actual people, can tell them apart without having to think about it, and sees himself as one of them. Incidentally, he has trouble understanding the difference between humans and robots once the truth behind his world is revealed.

R-Hinagiku (ISF-ISAAC-0010102F R-ヒナギク) – A military-class chapekku that was conscripted into the world created for Ichihiko. She was originally asked to take the role of the "older brother", but became the "next door neighbor" due to her unwillingness to be near the protagonist. Outwardly, Hinagiku picks on Ichihiko regularly and often ridicules him for being short. She tends to err on the side of honesty, and her straightforward approach to things puts her at odds with Shirotsumegusa on occasion.

R-Mizubashou (ISAAC-1011105HAL R-ミズバショウ) – A commander-class chapekku that proposed the robots of the St. Exupéry raise the last human. She took the role of "mother" in the family created for Ichihiko. As such, she looks after him and makes sure to cook his favorite foods. While Ichihiko's well-being is her top priority, Mizubashou fears of what would happen if he were to discover the truth behind his "world". Because of this, she will resort to shutting other robots down and even lacing Ichihiko's food with chemicals if it will somehow protect the secret.

R-Shirotsumegusa D (D-ISSG-0100118D R-シロツメグサD) – A drexler operator-class chapekku in charge of the network of nanomachines that course through the ship. In the family created for Ichihiko, she has taken the role of "father". As such, she goes to "work", handles the money in their family and buys Ichihiko presents. Shirotsumegusa often feels left out, and at times tries to get Ichihiko to spend more time with her than with Hinagiku or Mizubashou. As a drexler operator (which is interchangeably used with the title Chief Salamander), she has the ability to split into a younger version of herself and a small salamander named Sanshouo.

R-Kobatomugi (R-000111014L R-コバトムギ) – A playmate model-C chapekku that is given the role of teacher at the school Ichihiko attends. She was originally a waitress at a hotdog stand before the extinction of humanity.

R-Tanpopo 091 (ISAAC-1001009 R-タンポポ091) – One of several chapekku that go by the same name with a serial number to segregate them. 091 is in charge of taking care of a large corn field inside the ship. Tanpopo joins Ichihiko's family as his "little sister" after Mizubashou decides that he needs to learn the joys of being an older brother.

R-Benibana (ISF-ISAAC-0010104F R-ベニバナ) – A military-class chapekku that takes the role of the antagonist of the story. She attempts to kidnap Ichihiko in order to reveal the truth behind the world the others built for him. She was originally opposed to Mizubashou's plan, but her voicebox was sealed by Mizubashou and Shirotsumegusa.

Taisho (F-605 タイショー) – A saberhagen droid that was given the role of Ichihiko's "best friend". In accordance to his role, Taisho hangs out with the protagonist after school, and has a knack for getting both of them into trouble. He also has a tendency to get into arguments with Hinagiku, often calling her out on the fact that she likes Ichihiko. Taisho was drafted into Ichihiko's world after Mizubashou found out that he taught the protagonist how to talk like the saberhagen droids.

Administrator HAL (司法HAL, shihō HAL) – The St. Exupéry's central computer. HAL is considered to be the top authority on the ship, its commands capable of overriding any orders given by commander-class chapekku. It also monitors how the chapekku behave and will correct them in accordance to the Laws of Robotics. As a computer, HAL operates entirely on logic and is not burdened by emotions.

== Gameplay ==
=== General ===
The story switches between first-person and third-person narrative, but for the most part tells the story from Ichihiko's point of view. The flow of the story is often interrupted by flashbacks from before or soon after Ichihiko's awakening that explain how the game's events came to be.

The story is split into chapters and uses titles that give hints of things to come. To further help delineate the direction the story is taking, the game uses passages from The Little Prince or Mother Goose nursery rhymes that are relevant to that point in the story recited in French.

During the first play-through, the game has no choices for the player to make and will automatically go for the bad ending. Dialogue choices appear from the second play-through on, allowing Ichihiko to end up with Hinagiku, Mizubashou, Shirotsumegusa, Tanpopo, Kobatomugi or Benibana.

=== Game Engine ===
R.U.R.U.R. uses light's patented Malie System, which provides the visual novel interface that is used through the whole game. The Malie System also presents the Another Story option to the player after the game has been cleared once.

=== Another Story ===
Another Story is an option that loads a text file containing the Malie System's scripting language. This in effect allows the player to create a story involving the game's characters using everything the game engine has to offer.

R.U.R.U.R. comes with built-in tutorials detailing the commands available. Additionally, light periodically releases Another Story scripts for their registered customers to download.

== Technology ==
Chapekku – Humanoid machines that are grown in vats. They closely resemble humans, but are imbued with technological enhancements through nanomachines inside the vats. While they have similar biological processes, they do not "heal" the way a human does, and instead require regular maintenance to keep themselves in top form. Chapekku do not age or get sick.

In one of the endings, two human-shaped children specifically named student A and B attended "school" after Ichihiko graduated. Considering that these children looked human and one even sounded like Ichihiko, it might have been possible that one of the characters is their mother. Also, one of the endings has one of the chapekku become a mother. So chapekku can bear children.

EES Lens – Also known as "Arisian Lens". A colored lens attached to a chapekku's forehead. It functions as a communication device, allowing chapekku to communicate and quickly exchange information without having to talk. It can also be used to verify a decided course of action with Administrator HAL. The EES Lens can also be used as a scanning device, allowing chapekku to see and analyze objects and machines that are not directly in front of them.

Drexler – A term for nanomachines that course throughout the ship. They can be used for numerous things, including stabilizing atmospheric conditions and limited maintenance of life forms (trees and flowers).

Drexler Operator – A chapekku in charge of a network of nanomachines. Capable of creating multiple images of themselves using the nanomachine network, and can use them to alter programing code to enable or disable other robots.

War Toaster – Weapon attachments that are accessible only to military-class chapekku. The parts involved and level of power are separated by class. The game mentions four War Toaster classes (Class-1, Class-2, Class-3 and Class-6).

All War Toaster attachments come with DeLameter Blaster arm attachments.

Saberhagen – Multi-purpose droids that serve a variety of functions on the ship, from cooking food to mechanical maintenance to even acting. Being so numerous, there is a plethora of varying personalities amongst them, but are limited to communicating using the phrase "Oui, monsieur".

== Staff ==
Character Designs – Mahiru Izumi (泉 まひる, Izumi Mahiru)

Mecha Designs – AKINOKO, Gorou Murata (村田 護郎, Murata Gorō)

Scenario – Hiro Itou (伊藤 ヒロ, Itō Hiro), Hijiri Nakajima (中島 聖, Nakajima Hijiri)

Music – Hideki Higuchi (樋口 秀樹, Higuchi Hideki), Ryuu Umemoto (梅本 竜, Umemoto Ryū)

Opening Theme "ROSE!ROSE!ROSE!"

Composed and written by Hideki Higuchi (樋口 秀樹, Higuchi Hideki)
Performed by Rin (凛)

Ending Theme "Vow" (誓いの言葉, Chikai no kotoba)

Composed and written by Hideki Higuchi (樋口 秀樹, Higuchi Hideki)
Performed by WHITE-LIPS

Voice Cast

Ichihiko – Jun Kasahara (笠原 准, Kasahara Jun)
R-Hinagiku – Fuuka Hinami (雛見 風香, Hinami Fūka)
R-Mizubashou – Nana Nogami (野神 奈々, Nogami Nana)
R-Shirotsumegusa, Sanshouo – Yukari Aoyama (青山 ゆかり, Aoyama Yukari)
R-Kobatomugi, Taisho – Rino Kawashima (かわしま りの, Kawashima Rino)
R-Tanpopo – Kai Ousaka (桜坂 かい, Ōsaka Kai)
R-Benibana, HAL – Hikaru Isshiki (一色 ヒカル, Isshiki Hikaru)
French Narration – Princesse de notre beau Français
