= Ryu Umemoto =

Japanese video game composer (1974–2011)

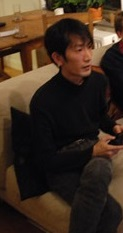

Background information
- Also known as: MIZINCO
- Born: 18 February 1974
- Origin: Yokohama, Kanagawa Prefecture, Japan
- Died: 16 August 2011 (aged 37)
- Genres: Video game Chiptune; Electronic
- Occupations: Composer; Arranger; Sound director
- Instruments: Sound chip Synthesizer
- Years active: 1992–2011
- Website: ryu-umemoto.com (archived)

Ryu Umemoto (梅本 竜, Umemoto Ryū; February 18, 1974 – August 16, 2011) was a Japanese video game music composer, born in Yokohama, Kanagawa Prefecture. He is known for composing soundtracks to various visual novel and shoot 'em up video games since the 1990s, for several companies including FamilySoft, C's Ware, ELF Corporation, D4 Enterprise, and CAVE. He is considered to be one of the greatest FM-synth chiptune composers, and has often been compared to Yuzo Koshiro.

== Biography ==
He was born on February 18, 1974, in Yokohama, Kanagawa Prefecture. He was a descendant of the 16th-century daimyō Takeda Shingen. He was also a practitioner of Zen Buddhism, which had a strong influence on his melodic music, much of which had spiritual undertones: he incorporated scale and key changes and time signatures in a way that would mathematically reference Zen concepts, such as angles of holy temples or mountains, meditative breathing rhythms or lucky numbers. The first video game he ever played was Taito's Elevator Action (1983).

He never had any formal education in music, but was entirely self-taught, and had often experimented with synthesizers since he was young. His musical influences included electronic music band Yellow Magic Orchestra and video game composer Yuzo Koshiro. During high school, Umemoto began doing freelance projects for personal computer game soundtracks. His first assignment was for the company FamilySoft, after sending them some demo works.

During the 1990s, he composed the soundtracks for various personal computer games, establishing himself as a commercial musician. From 1992 to 1993, he worked for FamilySoft, producing soundtracks for mostly anime-based games, including several based on the mecha anime franchises Gundam and Macross. He also arranged some of the tracks in the 1995 "PMD" arrangement CD for Princess Maker 2.

Xenon - "Xenon" (1994)
The title theme "Xenon" from the 1994 visual novel adventure game Xenon by C's Ware.

Eve Burst Error - "Room (Marina)" (1995)
"Room (Marina)" from the 1995 visual novel adventure game Eve Burst Error by C's Ware.

He then worked as a freelance musician on various projects for other companies such as C's Ware and ELF Corporation, often working closely with scenario writer Hiroyuki Kanno, with whom he became friends. His first major projects were for several C's Ware visual novels, beginning with the 1994 title Desire, an eroge science fiction adventure game. He had to meet tight deadlines for C's Ware, often under two months while working on simultaneous projects. He also composed the soundtracks for other C's Ware visual novels such as Xenon (1994) and EVE Burst Error (1995). He then worked with ELF, for which he composed the soundtrack for their most famous visual novel, YU-NO: A girl who chants love at the bound of this world (1996).

In later years, he expanded his range of activity as an arranger, conductor and sound director. From 2007 to 2008, he began working for D4 Enterprise, establishing the ARTDINK sound department with former employees of ThinkRidge. He began gaining more international attention for his work with the company CAVE in the last few years of his life, producing soundtracks for bullet hell shooters such as Espgaluda II: Black Label (2010), Akai Katana (2010), NIN2-JUMP (2011), and Mushihimesama Version 1.5 (2011). On August 16, 2011, he died of chronic bronchitis at the age of 37.

== Soundtracks ==
Soundtracks composed by Umemoto include the following:

1992:

- Hibiki (PC-98)
- Mobile Suit Gundam Hyper Classic Operation (FM Towns)
- Square Resort: Hyper Senshasen (X68000)

1993:

- Azure (FM Towns)
- Dengeki Division (PC-98)
- Macross: Remember Me (PC-98)
- Mobile Suit Gundam: A Year of War (PC-98)
- Mobile Suit Gundam: Return of Zion (PC-98)
- MSX Train (MSX)
- Princess Maker 2 (PC-98, FM Towns, PC Engine, Saturn, MS-DOS, Windows, Classic Mac OS, GP32) (arrangement of 2 tracks for a music CD)
- Science Ninja Team Gatchaman (PC-98)
- War Torn Versnag (X68000)

1994:

- Desire: Spiral of Immorarity (PC-98, Saturn, Windows, PlayStation 2)
- Macross: Skull Leader (PC-98)
- Macross: Love Stories (PC-98)
- Xenon: Phantom Limb (PC-98, FM Towns)

1995:

- EVE Burst Error (PC-98, FM Towns, Saturn, Windows, PlayStation 2)

1996:

- Grounseed (PC-98)
- Mahou Shoujo Fancy Coco (PC-98)
- Rema the Truth (Windows)
- YU-NO: A girl who chants love at the bound of this world (PC-98, Saturn, Windows)

2002:

- Popotan (Windows)

2003:

- Eclipse (Windows)

2005:

- Espgaluda II (Arcade, i-mode, iOS)
- Glas Auszeichnung (Windows)

2006:

- CrymeRhymeParadox (Windows)
- Ano Machi no Koi no Uta (Windows)
- StoneAge2 (Windows)

2007:

- R.U.R.U.R. (Windows)

2000:

- Psyvariar "The Mix" (Arcade, PlayStation 2)

2009:

- Contrasta: Monochrome Fairytale (Windows)
- Kaiten Illust Puzzle Guruguru Logic (Nintendo DSi)
- Kitto, sumi wataru asa shoku yorimo (Windows)
- Snapdots (Nintendo DSi)

2010:

- Espgaluda II Black Label (Xbox 360)
- Akai Katana (Arcade)
- Akai Katana Shin (Xbox 360)

2011:

- Nin2-Jump (Xbox Live Arcade)
- Instant Brain (Xbox 360)
- Mushihimesama Version 1.5 (Arcade)
