= The Anime Machine =

2009 reference work by Thomas Lamarre

The Anime Machine: A Media Theory of Animation
- Author: Thomas Lamarre
- Genre: Reference
- Publisher: University of Minnesota Press
- Publication date: 2009
- Pages: 408
- ISBN: 978-0-8166-5155-9
- OCLC: 503575450
- Text: The Anime Machine: A Media Theory of Animation at the Internet Archive

The Anime Machine: A Media Theory of Animation is a 2009 reference work by the animation scholar Thomas Lamarre. It focuses primarily on analyzing anime, through which Lamarre presents his theory of "animetism", a different perspective with which to view a world saturated with modern technology. The book was published in 2009 by the University of Minnesota Press, and received positive reviews from scholars.

== Contents ==
The work is divided into three sections: "Multiplanar Image", "The Exploded View", and "Girl Computerized". Lamarre takes a perspective on Japanese animation largely separated from cultural analysis, which the animation scholar Susan J. Napier saw as standing in direct contrast to a bias among Western audiences to view all foreign media as inherently reflective of its culture of origin. In the book's introduction, Lamarre states that he "[gave] priority to technical determination over social, cultural, historical, and economic determination." One of the book's primary arguments is Lamarre's theory of "animetism" – built upon Paul Virilio's theory of "cinematism" as well as a theory of the machine put forth by Gilles Deleuze – which suggests a different mode of perceiving and living in a world filled with technology. Lamarre presents examples from the body of Japanese animation which provide alternative views to what he refers to as the "modern technological condition", such as director Hayao Miyazaki's divergences from traditional technology and the postmodern depiction of gender and sexuality in Chobits (2002).

== Reception ==
Reviewers in academic publications provided largely positive commentary on the book. The scholar Kathryn Dunlap found the level of detail in the book's discussion to be "extraordinary", which she felt would allow readers unfamiliar with the body of Japanese animation to contextualize the arguments made. Napier felt that the work was "breathtakingly ambitious and intellectually exciting", but wrote that Lamarre did not clearly delineate his arguments between his theory of "animetism" and the animation medium as a whole, and reported that some of her students felt this was a conceptually difficult element of the work's thesis. In a review for The Journal of Asian Studies, the scholar Daniel Johnson commended the book as a "rare work of theoretical rigor and clarity", and felt that it would influence a new style of academic inquiry into Japanese animation. The literature scholar Miri Nakamura echoed this opinion, finding the book to be an "enlightening work of astounding intellectual depth". ImageTexT's Caleb Simmons wrote that Lamarre's arguments of the abstraction of the machine within animation's social aspects is "masterfully discussed" and felt that the highlight of the book's prose were the chapters in which it was applied to examples of the multiplanar image and the separation of the animated layers in a composition. However, the scholar Shion Kono wrote in Monumenta Nipponica that the book's theory was presented too slowly to be accessible for some readers.
