= Kojin Karatani =

Japanese philosopher

- 柄谷 行人
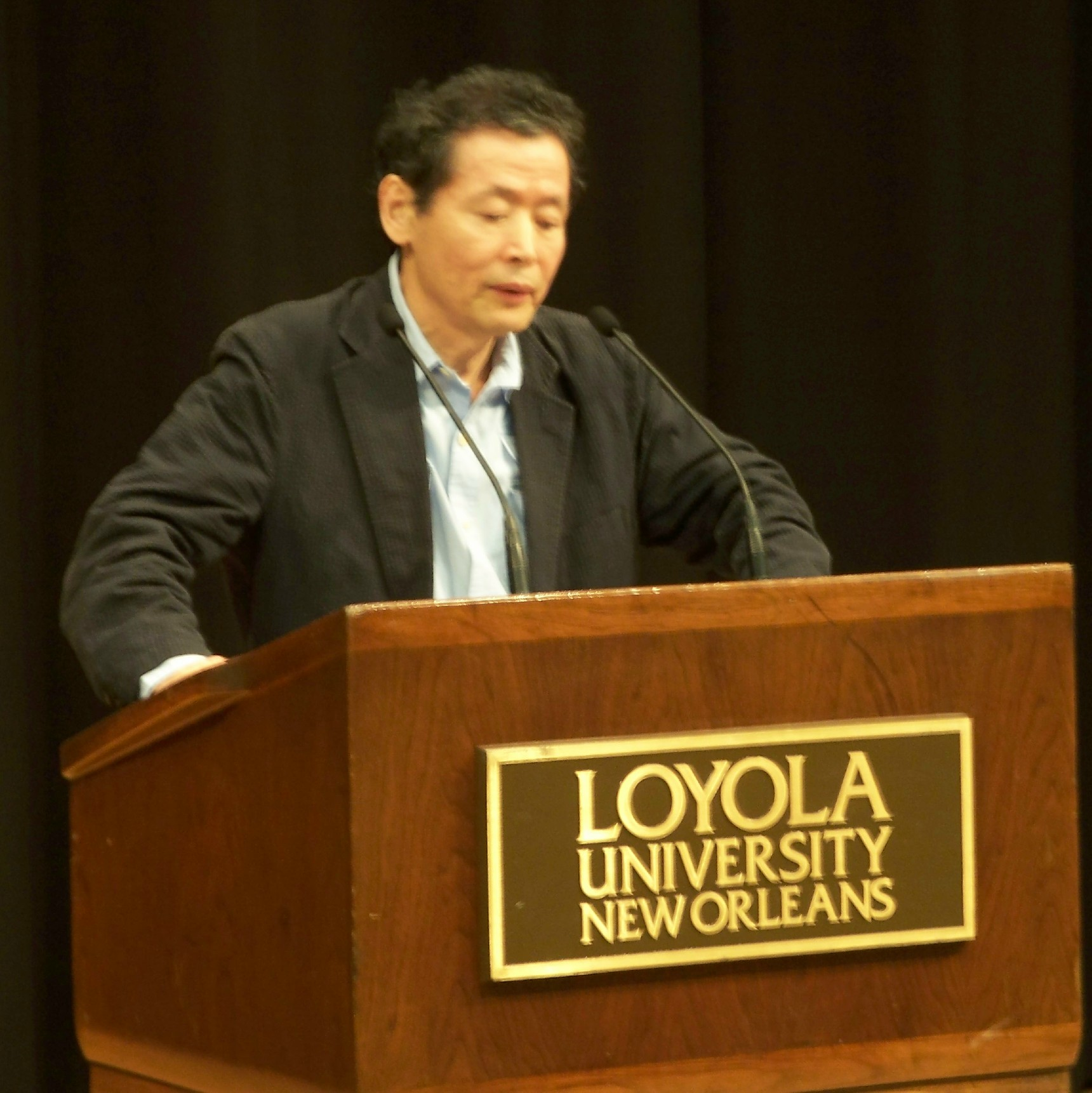
- Karatani lecturing at Loyola University New Orleans, 2008
- Born: 6 August 1941 (age 85); Amagasaki, Japan
- Awards: Berggruen Prize (2022)

Education
- Education: University of Tokyo (BA, MA)

Philosophical work
- Institutions: Hosei University; Kindai University
- Main interests: Comparative literature Literary criticism

Kōjin Karatani (柄谷 行人, Karatani Kōjin; born 6 August 1941) is a Japanese philosopher and literary critic.

== Biography ==
Karatani entered the University of Tokyo in 1960, where he joined the radical Marxist Communist League, better known as "The Bund," and participated in the massive 1960 Anpo protests against the U.S.-Japan Security Treaty, which he would later come to view as a formative political experience.

Karatani graduated with a B.A. in economics in 1965, and added an M.A. in English literature in 1967. The Gunzō Literary Prize, which he received at the age of 27 for an essay on Natsume Sōseki, was his first critical acclaim as a literary critic. While teaching at Hosei University, Tokyo, he wrote extensively about modernity and postmodernity with a particular focus on language, number, and money, concepts that form the subtitle of one of his central books: Architecture as Metaphor.

In 1975, he was invited to Yale University to teach Japanese literature as a visiting professor, where he met Paul de Man and Fredric Jameson and began to work on formalism. He started from a study of Natsume Sōseki.

Karatani collaborated with novelist Kenji Nakagami, to whom he introduced the works of Faulkner. With Nakagami, he published Kobayashi Hideo o koete (Overcoming Kobayashi Hideo). The title is an ironic reference to “Kindai no chokoku” (Overcoming Modernity), a symposium held in the summer of 1942 at Kyoto Imperial University (now Kyoto University) at which Hideo Kobayashi (whom Karatani and Nakagami did not hold in great esteem) was a participant.

He was also a regular member of ANY, the international architects' conference that was held annually for the last decade of the 20th century and that also published an architectural/philosophical series with Rizzoli under the general heading of Anyone.

Since 1990, Karatani has been regularly teaching at Columbia University as a visiting professor.

Karatani founded the New Associationist Movement (NAM) in Japan in the summer of 2000. NAM was conceived as a counter–capitalist/nation-state association, inspired by the experiment of LETS (Local Exchange Trading Systems, based on non-marketed currency). He was also the co-editor, with Akira Asada, of the Japanese quarterly journal Hihyōkūkan (Critical Space), until it ended in 2002.

In 2006, Karatani retired from the chair of the International Center for Human Sciences at Kinki University, Osaka, where he had been teaching.

In 2022, Karatani was awarded the $1 million Berggruen Prize for Culture and Philosophy.

== Philosophy ==
Karatani has produced philosophical concepts, such as "the will to architecture", which he calls the foundation of all Western thinking, but the best-known of them is probably that of "transcritique", which he proposed in his book Transcritique, where he reads Kant through Marx and vice versa. Writing about Transcritique in the New Left Review of January–February 2004, Slavoj Žižek brought Karatani's work to greater critical attention. Žižek borrowed the concept of "parallax view" (which is also the title of his review) for the title of his own 2006 book, The Parallax View.

Karatani has interrogated the possibility of a (de Manian) deconstruction and engaged in a dialogue with Jacques Derrida at the Second International Conference on Humanistic Discourse, organized by the Université de Montréal. Derrida commented on Karatani's paper "Nationalism and Ecriture" with an emphasis on the interpretation of his own concept of écriture.

== Bibliography ==
In English

- Origins of Modern Japanese Literature, Duke University Press, 1993. Translated by Brett de Bary
- Architecture as Metaphor; Language, Number, Money MIT Press, 1995. Translated by Sabu Kohso
- Transcritique: On Kant and Marx, MIT Press, 2003. Translated by Sabu Kohso
- History and Repetition, Columbia University Press, 2011. Translated by Seiji M. Lippit
- The Structure of World History : From Modes of Production to Modes of Exchange, Duke University Press, 2014. Translated by Michael K. Bourdaghs
- Nation and Aesthetics: On Kant and Freud, Oxford University Press USA, 2017. Translated by Jonathan E. Abel, Hiroki Yoshikuni and Darwin H. Tsen
- Isonomia and the Origins of Philosophy, Duke University Press, 2017. Translated by Joseph A. Murphy
- Marx: Towards the Centre of Possibility, Verso, 2020. Edited, translated, and with an introduction by Gavin Walker
- The End of Modern Literature: On Permanent Revolution, Verso, 2026. Edited by Jonathan E. Abel, Yoshiki Tajiri and Hiroki Yoshikuni. (Essay and Responses)

In Japanese

- 畏怖する人間 [Human in Awe], Tōjūsha, 1972
- 意味という病 [Meaning as Illness], Kawadeshobō, 1975
- マルクスその可能性の中心 [Marx: The Center of Possibilities], Kōdansha, 1978
- 日本近代文学の起源 [Origins of Modern Japanese literature], Kōdansha, 1980
- 隠喩としての建築 [Architecture as Metaphor], Kōdansha, 1983
- 内省と遡行 [Introspection and Retrospection], Kōdansha,1984
- 批評とポストモダン[Postmodernism and Criticism], Fukutake, 1985
- 探究 1 [Philosophical Inquiry 1], Kōdansha, 1986
- 言葉と悲劇[Language and Tragedy], Daisanbunmeisha, 1989
- 探究 2 [Philosophical Inquiry 2], Kōdansha,1989
- 終焉をめぐって[On the 'End' ], Fukutake, 1990
- 漱石論集成 [Collected Essays on Sōseki], Daisanbunmeisha, 1992
- ヒューモアとしての唯物論 [Materialism as Humor], Chikumashobō, 1993
- “戦前”の思考 [Thoughts before the war], Bungeishunjusha, 1994
- 坂口安吾と中上健次[Sakaguchi Ango and Nakagami Kenji], Ohta Press, 1996
- 倫理21[Ethics 21], Heibonsha, 2000
- 可能なるコミュニズム[A Possible Communism], Ohta Press, 2000
- トランスクリティーク：カントとマルクス[Transcritique: On Kant and Marx], Hihyōkūkansha, 2001
- 日本精神分析[Psychoanalysis of Japan or Analysis of Japanese Spirit], Bungeishunjusha, 2002
- ネーションと美学 [Nation and Aesthetics], Iwanami Shoten, 2004
- 歴史と反復[History and Repetition], Iwanami Shoten, 2004
- 近代文学の終わり[The End of Modern Literature], Inscript, 2005
- 思想はいかに可能か[How the ideas can be created], Inscript, 2005
- 世界共和国へ[Toward the World Republic], Iwanami Shoten, 2006
- 日本精神分析[Psychoanalyzation on Japan and/or Japanese Spirit], Kōdansha, 2007
- 柄谷行人 政治を語る[Talks on politics], Tosyo Shinbun, 2009
- 世界史の構造[The Structure of World History], Iwanami Shoten, 2010
- "世界史の構造"を読む[Reading "The Structure of World History"], Inscript, 2011
- 政治と思想 1960-2011[Politics and Thought:1960-2011], Heibonsha, 2012
- 脱原発とデモ[Denuclearization and Demonstration], Chikuma Shobo, 2012
- 哲学の起源[The Origin of Philosophy], Iwanami Shoten, 2012
- 柳田國男論[On Kunio Yanagita], Inscript, 2013
- 遊動論：柳田国男と山人[On Nomadization : Kunio Yanagita and Yamabito people], Bungeishunjusha, 2014
- 帝国の構造[The Structure of Empire], Seitosha, 2014
- 定本 柄谷行人 文学論集[Symposium on Literature], Iwanami Shoten, 2016
- 憲法の無意識[Unconsciousness of the Constitution of Japan], Iwanami Shoten, 2016
- 力と交換様式[Power and Modes of Exchange], Iwanami Shoten, October 5th, 2022

== See also ==
- Fredric Jameson
- Arata Isozaki
- List of deconstructionists
