= EVE Burst Error =

1995 video game

- NEC PC-98 cover
- Developer: C's Ware
- Publishers: Kadokawa Shoten; Imagineer; MangaGamer
- Designer: Hiroyuki Kanno
- Composers: Ryu Umemoto; Ryu Takami
- Platforms: Sega Saturn, Microsoft Windows, PlayStation 2, PlayStation Portable, NEC PC-9801, Nintendo Switch, PlayStation Vita
- Release: 22 November 1995: NEC PC-9801; JP: 22 November 1995 Sega Saturn; JP: 24 January 1997 Microsoft Windows; JP: 30 May 1997; WW: April 1999 PlayStation 2; JP: 24 July 2003 PlayStation Portable; JP: 25 March 2010 PlayStation Vita; JP: 28 April 2016 Nintendo Switch; JP: 25 October 2018
- Genres: Adventure game, visual novel

EVE Burst Error is a 1995 visual novel adventure game developed by C's Ware, originally released as an erotic game. It was written and produced by Hiroyuki Kanno, with chiptune video game music composed by Ryu Umemoto. It is the first game in the EVE series of visual novels. The game follows a government agent and a private investigator investigating a series of bizarre cases which are later connected to one another.

Upon release, the game was positively received by critics, and gained such widespread popularity that EVE became a long-running franchise. A remake, titled EVE Burst Error R, was released for the PlayStation Vita in 2016 and later ported to the Nintendo Switch in 2018.

== Gameplay ==
The game features a branching narrative where two different protagonists, one male and one female, provide different perspectives on the story. The game introduced a unique twist to the system by allowing the player to switch between both protagonists at any time during the game, instead of finishing one protagonist's scenario before playing the other. EVE Burst Error often requires the player to have both protagonists co-operate with each other at various points during the game.

== Plot ==
The game follows two protagonists: Marina and Kojiroh. Marina is an incredibly skilled intelligence agent tasked with protecting a girl named Mayako Mido, who is the daughter of a Japanese diplomat to a fictional Middle Eastern country called Eldia. As the attacks on Mayako ramp up in severity, however, a dangerous government dispute seems to be at the center of these threats. Kojiroh is a private investigator that can't seem to get a case, until a stroke of good luck lands him with a case looking for a school principal's missing painting. Kojiroh soon investigates a string of murders that pulls her into a larger case concerning both the Japanese and Eldian government, and the two cases are coincidentally connected to one another.

== Releases ==
The PC-98 version was released on 22 November 1995. The game was later ported to consoles, with mature content censored. An English version on Windows came out in April 1999, also censored. In 2026 a fan patch translating the original, uncensored PC-98 version into English was made available; based on the official English localisation, it adjusted "55-60%" of the script to be closer to the Japanese original, such as by removing an overwhelming abundance of Bill Clinton jokes.

== Reception ==
Reception

Review scores
Publication	Score
Famitsu	(SSAT) 7/10, 5/10, 6/10, 4/10
Joypad	(SSAT) 25%, 80%
RPGFan	(PC) 92/100 (PC) 91/100 (PC) 83/100
Saturn Fan	(SSAT) 7.8/10
Sega Saturn Magazine (JP)	(SSAT) 8.33/10

In Japan, EVE Burst Error gained massive popularity, enough to earn a console port and overseas release, which were unusual for an eroge. The game reached into the top ten best-selling Saturn titles that week, with 106,694 copies sold. It sold 190,404 copies in Japan in the first half of 1997 and ended the year with 194,750 copies sold, making it one of the best-selling Saturn titles.

In 2000, the game was ranked as the number one Saturn title in a reader survey conducted by the Japanese Sega Saturn Magazine, earning an average score of 9.5014 out of 10. In 2017, Famitsu readers voted EVE Burst Error the 17th best adventure game of all time.

Kotaro Uchikoshi has cited EVE as an inspiration, listing it among games "more interesting than 999" (a game which he wrote and directed) and saying "I wouldn't say I was 'influenced' by those games so much as I was violently pummeled by them", with as much impact on him as 2001: A Space Odyssey in his youth.

== Franchise ==
EVE series
1995	EVE Burst Error
1996–1997
1998	EVE: The Lost One
1999	ADAM: The Double Factor
2000	EVE Zero
2001	EVE: The Fatal Attraction
2002
2003	EVE Burst Error Plus
2004–2005
2006	EVE: New Generation
2007
2008	EVE Jan
2009
2010	Burst Error: EVE the First
2011–2015
2016	EVE Burst Error R
2017–2018
2019	EVE Rebirth Terror
2020–2021
2022	EVE Ghost Enemies

The game spawned multiple sequels, among them EVE: The Lost One (written by Kazuki Sakuraba), EVE: New Generation (written by Kotaro Uchikoshi) and EVE Rebirth Terror (written by Kasa Sakaki, scenario writer for Tsuyokiss). A remake titled EVE Burst Error R with upgraded graphics was released in Japan by Red Flagship's label El-Dia on April 28, 2016, for Microsoft Windows and the PlayStation Vita and on October 25, 2018, for the Nintendo Switch.

Additionally, the late Hiroyuki Kanno, the producer of the original game, left C's Ware after its production and was not involved in subsequent titles. Kanno died in 2011 at the age of 43 due to a cerebral infarction and brain hemorrhage.
