= Akira Asada =

Japanese postmodern critic and curator

- 浅田 彰
- Born: March 23, 1957 (age 69); Japan

Akira Asada (浅田 彰, Asada Akira; born March 23, 1957) is a Japanese postmodern critic and curator, whose interests include contemporary arts, the history of social thought, and economic philosophy. He is currently the Dean of the Graduate School at the Kyoto University of Art and Design. Until March 2008, he served as an associate professor of economics at the Institute of Economic Research at Kyoto University (KIER). Asada is widely recognized as the author of the bestselling book, "構造と力─記号論を超えて (Structure and Power: Beyond Semiotics)", which was published in 1983. He holds a position as a member of the supervisory committee at NTT InterCommunication Center, and was a co-editor of the Japanese quarterly journal Hihyōkūkan (Critical Space) with Kojin Karatani until 2002.

It has been noted that it was popular in late 1980s Japan to have words ending with "... phenomenon", an example being the use of the expression "Akira Asada phenomenon", which took the name of Asada as he was a central figure in the "new academism" that was a much-discussed topic at the time.

== Bibliography ==
In Japanese

- 構造と力─記号論を超えて [Structure and Power—Beyond Semiotics], Keisō Shobō, 1983
- 逃走論 [A Theory of Escape], Chikuma Shobō, 1984
- ヘルメスの音楽 [The Music of Hermes], Chikuma Shobō, 1985
- 「歴史の終わり」を超えて [Beyond "The End of History"], Chūōkōron Shinsha, 1999
- 映画の世紀末 [The End of Cinema's Century], Shinchōsha, 2000
