= Thomas Lamarre =

Author and academic

Thomas Mark Lamarre is an author and academic.

== Biography ==
Lamarre was awarded a bachelor's degree in Biology in 1981 at Georgetown University. He continued his studies in science and the University of the Mediterranean Aix-Marseille II in France, earning a master's equivalent degree in Oceanology in 1982, and a doctorate equivalent in Oceanology in 1985. Lamarre then entered a second doctorate program at the University of Chicago, where he earned a master's degree in East Asian Languages and Civilizations in 1987. Chicago granted his second doctorate in 1992. Lamarre taught courses on East Asian studies at McGill University. He later moved to the University of Chicago, where he is a professor in the Department of Cinema and Media Studies.

=== Accolades ===
The Association for Asian Studies awarded Lamarre the John Whitney Hall Book Prize in 2002.

== Selected works ==
- Can Writing Go on Without a Mind? Orality, Literacy, Ideography, Japanology (1994)
- Uncovering Heian Japan: an Archaeology of Sensation and Inscription (2000)
- Project Insider (2000)
- Impacts of Modernities (2004)
- Shadows on the Screen: Tanizaki Jun'ichirō on Cinema and "Oriental" Aesthetics (2005)
- The Anime Machine: A Media Theory of Animation (2009)
- The Anime Ecology: A Genealogy of Television, Animation, and Game Media (2018)
