= Hiroki Azuma =

Japanese philosopher and critic (born 1971)

- 東 浩紀
- Born: May 9, 1971 (age 55)
- Occupation: Cultural critic

Philosophical work
- Era: Contemporary philosophy, 20th-century philosophy, 21st-century philosophy
- Region: Japanese philosophy
- School: Continental philosophy, deconstruction, materialism, dualism
- Main interests: Metaphysics, ontology, ethics, philosophy of language, communication studies, history of science, philosophy of science, studies of culture and representation, popular culture, otaku studies, literary theory, literary criticism, social philosophy, social thought, information society
- Notable ideas: Misdelivery, Singular/Plural transcendentness, Postal space, Animalization, Database consumption, moe-elements, Gamelike realism, Disciplinary power/Environment-controlling power, Human/Animal publicness, General will 2.0, Weak ties, Villagers/Travelers/Tourists, Postal Multitude

Hiroki Azuma (東 浩紀, Azuma Hiroki) (born May 9, 1971) is a Japanese cultural critic, novelist, and philosopher. His specializations include Philosophy, Studies of Culture and Representation, and information society studies. He is a professor at ZEN University and the co-founder of Genron, an independent institute in Tokyo, Japan.

== Biography ==
Azuma was born in Mitaka, Tokyo. Azuma received his PhD in Culture and Representation from the University of Tokyo in 1999 and became a professor at the International University of Japan in 2003. He was an Executive Research Fellow and Professor at the Center for Global Communications (GLOCOM) and a Research Fellow at Stanford University's Japan Center. Since 2006, he has been working at the Center for Study of World Civilizations at the Tokyo Institute of Technology.

Azuma is married to the writer and poet Hoshio Sanae, and they have one child together. His father-in-law is the translator, novelist, and occasional critic Kotaka Nobumitsu.

== Overview of major works ==
=== Ontological, Postal (1998) ===
Ontological, Postal: About Jacques Derrida (Japanese: 存在論的、郵便的：ジャック・デリダについて, Hepburn: Sonzaironteki, Yubinteki: Jakku Derida ni tsuite) is Azuma's doctoral dissertation, published by Shinchosha in 1998. It investigated why Derrida, in the 1970s and 1980s, began writing texts in experimental styles rather than conventional academic philosophical essays. In this research, Azuma critically built upon the ideas of Japanese critics like Kojin Karatani and Akira Asada. The work was awarded the Suntory Literary Prize in 1999. To mark the 25th anniversary of Ontological, Postal's publication, a symposium was held in 2023, and a collection of essays based on the symposium was published in 2024.

Azuma demonstrated that the concept of deconstruction Derrida presented early in his career differed from the one he introduced in the 1970s. The former, which Azuma calls "Negative-Theological Deconstruction," focuses on "the unrepresentable 'hole' or 'crack' within the entire system of representation to dismantle the whole." Azuma criticized Negative-Theological Deconstruction, arguing that by exaggeratedly emphasizing the system's deficiency, it ultimately absolutizes the very system that contains that deficiency.

As a critique of this, Azuma proposed the latter concept, "Postal Deconstruction." This deconstruction focuses on the "imperfection of the communication channel (media) in each instance, including failures in transmission/reception or mix-ups." Azuma asserts that this approach overcomes the problems of Negative-Theological Deconstruction. He conceptualized the process of Postal Deconstruction as "misdelivery".

=== Otaku: Japan's Database Animals (2001) ===
In this book, Azuma presented a theoretical framework using otaku culture as a case study to analyze database consumption and the emergence of a new subjectivity in postmodern society. As of 2024, the book has exceeded 100,000 copies in print in Japan and has been translated into Korean, French, English, and Chinese.

According to Stefan Hall, Azuma's work functions as a social commentary, arguing that otaku represent a specific type of postmodern condition—"database animals"—who seek "grand nonnarratives", thus eschewing the normative consumption mode that searches for deeper meaning. According to Fabian Schäfer and Martin Roth, Azuma's core ideas regarding databases overlap "surprisingly" with those presented in Lev Manovich's standard work, The Language of New Media.

=== Philosophy of the Tourist (2017) ===
In this book, Azuma uses the figure of the tourist to address major contemporary political and social impasses. Azuma connects the tourist to the idea of the "postal multitude", arguing that the tourist's experience often results in "misdelivery"—experiences diverging from expectations—which opens up space for "novel political insights."

Yuk Hui identifies the book as an "essential philosophical exercise". The work is welcomed for its goal of responding to the "political impasse of our time", particularly the intensification of geopolitical conflicts and the limitations of the nation-state concept. Hui praises Azuma's effort to "reinvent the tourist as a figure that heralds the possibility of transcending the limitations of the nation state". This effort is driven by Azuma's stated refusal to accept a world where the "path toward the universal global citizen has been blocked" (Weltbürgertum).

== Notable Awards ==
- 1999 – Suntory Literary Prize: Sonzaironteki, Yubinteki (Ontological, Postal)
- 2010 – Mishima Yukio Prize: Kwontamu Famirīzu (Quantum Families)
- 2017 – Mainichi Publishing Culture Award: Genron 0: Kankōkyaku no Tetsugaku (Philosophy of the Tourist)

== Works ==
- Hiroki Azuma. 存在論的、郵便的－ジャック・デリダについて
- Hiroki Azuma. 郵便的不安達
- Hiroki Azuma. 不過視なものの世界
- Hiroki Azuma. 動物化するポストモダン―オタクから見た日本社会
- Hiroki Azuma. ゲーム的リアリズムの誕生―動物化するポストモダン2
- Hiroki Azuma. 文学環境論集―東浩紀コレクションL
- Hiroki Azuma. 情報環境論集―東浩紀コレクションS
- Hiroki Azuma. 批評の精神分析―東浩紀コレクションD
- Hiroki Azuma. 郵便的不安たちβ
- Hiroki Azuma. サイバースペースはなぜそう呼ばれるか
- Hiroki Azuma. 一般意志2.0―ルソー、フロイト、グーグル
- Hiroki Azuma. セカイからもっと近くに―現実から切り離された文学の諸問題
- Hiroki Azuma. 弱いつながり―検索ワードを探す旅
- Hiroki Azuma. ゲンロン0―観光客の哲学
- Hiroki Azuma. ゆるく考える
- Hiroki Azuma. テーマパーク化する地球
- Hiroki Azuma. 哲学の誤配
- Hiroki Azuma. 新対話篇
- Hiroki Azuma. ゲンロン戦記――「知の観客」をつくる
- Hiroki Azuma. 忘却にあらがう 平成から令和へ
- Hiroki Azuma. 訂正可能性の哲学
- Hiroki Azuma. 訂正する力
- Hiroki Azuma. (2007) "The Animalization of Otaku Culture" Mechademia 2 175–188.
- Hiroki Azuma. Otaku: Japan's Database Animals. Minneapolis: University of Minnesota Press, 2009.
- Hiroki Azuma. General Will 2.0: Rousseau, Freud, Google, 2014.
- Hiroki Azuma. Philosophy of the Tourist, 2023.

== Joint works ==
- Kiyoshi Kasai & Hiroki Azuma. 動物化する世界の中で
- Masachi Osawa & Hiroki Azuma. 自由を考える――9・11以降の現代思想
- Akihiro Kitada & Hiroki Azuma. 東京から考える――格差・郊外・ナショナリズム
- Eiji Otsuka & Hiroki Azuma. リアルのゆくえ――おたく/オタクはどう生きるか
- Shinji Miyadai & Hiroki Azuma. 父として考える
- Naoki Inose & Hiroki Azuma. 正義について考えよう
- Ken Oyama & Hiroki Azuma. ショッピングモールから考える――ユートピア・バックヤード・未来都市
- Yoshinori Kobayashi & Shinji, Miyadai & Hiroki Azuma. 戦争する国の道徳――安保・沖縄・福島
- Ken Oyama & Hiroki Azuma. ショッピングモールから考える付章――庭・オアシス・ユートピア
- Daisuke Tsuda & Junichiro Nakagawa & Takeshi Natsuno & Hiroyuki Nishimura & Hiroki Azuma. ニコニコ超トークステージ――ネット言論はどこへいったのか？
- Atsushi Sasaki & Hiroki Azuma. 再起動する批評――ゲンロン批評再生塾第一期全記録
- Nozomi Omori & Hiroki Azuma. SFの書き方――「ゲンロン 大森望 SF創作講座」全記録
- Makoto Ichikawa & Satoshi Osawa & Ryota Fukushima & Hiroki Azuma. 現代日本の批評1975-2001
- Makoto Ichikawa & Satoshi Osawa & Atsushi Sasaki & Sayawaka & Hiroki Azuma. 現代日本の批評1975-2001
- Hidetaka Ishida & Hiroki Azuma. 新記号論――脳とメディアが出会うとき

== Novels ==
- Hiroki Azuma. クォンタム・ファミリーズ
- Hiroki Azuma. クリュセの魚

== See also ==
- Moe
- Superflat
- Kojin Karatani
- Akira Asada
- Eiji Ōtsuka
