= Desire (video game) =

1994 video game

- NEC PC-98 cover
- Developers: C's Ware; El Dia (remake)
- Publishers: C's Ware; El Dia (remake)
- Designer: Hiroyuki Kanno
- Composer: Ryu Umemoto
- Platforms: NEC PC-9801, FM Towns, Sega Saturn, Microsoft Windows, PlayStation 2, PlayStation Vita, PlayStation 4, Nintendo Switch
- Release: 22 July 1994: NEC PC-9801; JP: 22 July 1994 FM Towns; JP: 1994 Sega Saturn; JP: 1997 Microsoft Windows; JP: 1998; WW: 1999 PlayStation 2; JP: 2004 PlayStation Vita; JP: April 2017 Nintendo Switch; JP: 27 December 2019
- Genres: Adventure game, visual novel

Desire (Japanese title: DESIRE 背徳の螺旋) is a 1994 visual novel adventure game developed and published by C's Ware. At first an eroge for the PC-98, it has since been ported and remade for various platforms, often without the sexual content. It was the first collaboration between Hiroyuki Kanno and Ryu Umemoto, with Kanno writing the narrative and Umemoto composing the music.

The story takes place on a remote island named Desire, on which a mysterious scientific research project is conducted that even the employees know little about. The player can choose which character's perspective of the events to follow, chief engineer Makoto Izumi's or her reporter boyfriend Albert Macdgul's.

== Releases ==
Desire was released on consoles and overseas thanks to its popularity, atypical for eroge.

A remake by El Dia was released in Japan first on PlayStation Vita and PC in April 2017 and on Nintendo Switch in December 2019. Its graphics are based on the artwork of the Sega Saturn version.

== Reception ==
Saturn Fan scored the game 7.2; Sega Saturn Magazine 7/10, 9/10 and 8/10; and Famitsu 7/10, 7/10, 6/10 and 6/10.
