= Transmediation =

Process of translating a work into a different medium

Transmediation is the process of translating a work into a different medium. The definition of what constitutes transmediation would depend on how medium is defined or interpreted. In Understanding media, Marshall McLuhan offered a quite broad definition of a medium as "an extension of ourselves":

"In a culture like ours, long accustomed to splitting and dividing all things as a means of control, it is sometimes a bit of a shock to be reminded that, in operational and practical fact, the medium is the message. This is merely to say that the personal and social consequences of any medium — that is, of any extension of ourselves — result from the new scale that is introduced into our affairs by each extension of ourselves, or by any new technology."

From McLuhan's definition, it is possible to infer the definition of transmediation could involve at least two different dimensions: a sensory and semiotic translation. More recent interpretations expand dimensions to three, involving senses (sensory), meaning (semiotic) and signal. When referring to medium as a sensory mode, transmediation would require to move between senses (e.g., visual to aural, aural to tactile). When referring to transmediation as semiotic translation, transmediation can refer to the process of "responding to cultural texts in a range of sign systems — art, movement, sculpture, dance, music, and so on — as well as in words". Signal transmediation refers to the translation between organic, analog and digital signal.

Transmediation may utilize more than one media form. All the components of a transmediated work are interlinked with each other to form the whole network. Therefore, transmediated works are closely linked to semiotics and technology in the context of digital media. Transmediation can include response to traditional printed texts, as well as multimedia materials including video, animation, a website, a podcast, a game, etc.

Transmediation is closely linked to semiotics, which is the study of signs. Academic researchers and educators interested in transmediation are often also interested in media literacy, visual literacy, information literacy, and critical literacy.

Leonard Shlain highlights the importance of engaging students in the process of transmediation when writing, "Digital information comes in multiple forms, and students must learn to tell stories not just with words and numbers but also through images, graphics, color, sound, music, and dance. There is a grammar and literacy to each of these forms of communication. Bombarded with a wide variety of images regularly, students need sharp visual-interpretation skills to interact with the media analytically. Each form of communication has its own rules and grammar and should be taught in ways that lead students to be more purposeful, specific, and concise in communicating."

== See also ==
- Transmedia storytelling
- Transmediality
