= Henry Darger =

American artist and writer (1892–1973)

- Darger in 1971
- Born: Henry Joseph Darger Jr. April 12, 1892; Chicago, Illinois, U.S.
- Died: April 13, 1973 (aged 81); Chicago, Illinois, U.S.
- Burial place: All Saints Cemetery
- Occupations: Janitor; kitchen porter; writer; visual artist
- Known for: Writing; visual arts
- Style: Collage; watercolor painting; tracing
- Movement: Outsider art
- Writing career
- Genre: Fantasy literature
- Notable work: In the Realms of the Unreal

Henry Joseph Darger Jr. (/ˈdɑːrɡər/ DAR-ghər; April 12, 1892 – April 13, 1973) was an American janitor and hospital worker. He gained recognition only after his death for his vast body of visual art and writing. Darger was raised by his disabled father in Chicago. Frequently in fights, he was put into a charity home as his father's health declined, and in 1904 was sent to the then-named Illinois Asylum for Feeble-Minded Children in Lincoln, Illinois, officially due to his masturbation. He began making escape attempts after his father's death in 1908, and in 1910 was able to escape, walking much of the way to Chicago. As an adult he did menial jobs for several hospitals, interrupted by a brief stint in the United States Army during World War I. He spent much of his life in poverty and in later life was a recluse in his apartment. A devout Catholic, Darger attended Mass multiple times each day and collected religious memorabilia. Retiring in 1963 due to chronic pain, he was moved into a charity nursing home in late 1972, shortly before his death. During this move, his landlords Kiyoko and Nathan Lerner discovered his artwork and writings, which he had created and kept secret over the course of decades.

From around the early 1910s to the late 1930s, Darger wrote the 15,145-page novel In the Realms of the Unreal, centered on a rebellion of child slaves on a fantastical planet. The chief protagonists are the Vivian Girls, who fight to free the children from the enslaving Glandelinians. Inspired by the American Civil War and martyrdom stories, it features lengthy, gruesome descriptions of battles, many ending with the mass killing of rebel children. Between 1912 and 1925, Darger produced collages, often only loosely correlated to the book. Later he made these with watercolors and traced figures taken from popular sources such as magazines and children's books. These paintings grew more elaborate over time, with some of his largest works exceeding 10 feet (3 m) in length. Little girls, often in combat, are a primary focus; for unknown reasons, they are frequently depicted naked and exclusively with male genitalia. Other writings by Darger include a roughly 8,000-page unfinished sequel to In the Realms of the Unreal entitled Further Adventures of the Vivian Girls in Chicago, a decade-long daily weather journal, and The History of My Life—consisting of a 206-page autobiography followed by several thousand pages about the destruction caused by a fictional Illinois tornado.

Darger made no efforts to publish his work, and it was unknown to others until shortly before his death. He is frequently associated with the outsider art movement, which encompasses the work of self-taught creators outside the mainstream art community who frequently produce very singular and unusual work. His art was popularized by his former landlords and is now featured in many museum collections, with the largest at the American Folk Art Museum in New York City and the Intuit Art Museum in Chicago. Initial critical analysis of him and his work took a psychoanalytical approach, often focused on his many depictions of nude and brutalized children. Scholars have hypothesized several different psychological conditions Darger may have suffered from. Theories from earlier scholars that he was a pedophile or murderer have been discredited.

== Biography ==
=== Childhood ===
Henry Joseph Darger Jr. was born on April 12, 1892, in Chicago, Illinois, to Rosa (née Fullman) and Henry Darger. His father was a German immigrant born in Meldorf, who (despite physical disability) worked as a tailor. Rosa, from Wisconsin, was a housewife. Later in life, the younger Darger frequently claimed that he was a Brazilian born in São Paulo with the surname Dagarius, although there is no evidence of this. In April 1895, his mother died of an infection shortly after giving birth to his sister. His sister was put up for adoption; Darger recounted that he had never seen her or known her name. Darger remained in the care of his father, who he later recalled as a "kind and easy-going man". Darger described initially hating children younger than him and bullying them, which he retrospectively attributed to a lack of siblings; however, he wrote that he grew deeply fond of children later in life.

Darger attended grade school at Catholic schools. According to his later writings, he was able to transfer directly from first grade to third grade due to his ability to read. Relatively isolated, he often engaged in physical fights with teachers and other children when about seven or eight years old. Once, he allegedly slashed a teacher's arms and face with a knife. At some point, his poor behavior resulted in legal trouble, and he was moved to a "certain boys' home" in Morton Grove, Illinois, but his father brought him home after only a short stay.

When Darger was eight years old, around 1900, his father's physical health declined further, and he became unable to work or take care of his son. Darger's uncles paid for his father to be put into a Catholic poorhouse, while Darger was baptized and put in the Mission of Our Lady of Mercy, a church-run home for homeless and orphaned boys. As the home was far away from any of the city's Catholic schools, Darger began attending public elementary school. The mission was locally nicknamed the "News Boys' Home" due to its practice of having its residents sell newspapers to pay for their stay.

==== Institutionalization ====
Darger disliked the boys' home and fantasized about running away. His father visited him occasionally, and at one point attempted to have one of his relatives adopt him. Darger was successful academically but alienated his peers through what he described as "strange noises with my mouth, nose, and throat" and repetitive motions with his hand. His vocalizations had him briefly expelled from his elementary school, but he was readmitted with the support of his home's director. Despite his readmission, his caretakers seem to have viewed him as "feeble-minded" or insane. After a clinical examination in November 1904, Darger was institutionalized at the Illinois Asylum for Feeble-Minded Children in Lincoln, Illinois. During the early 20th century, children in such facilities were expected to remain in the asylum system for life. An intake form prepared by a physician and his father described him as mentally deficient purely due to his "self-abuse" (masturbation), which was marked as having begun around age six.

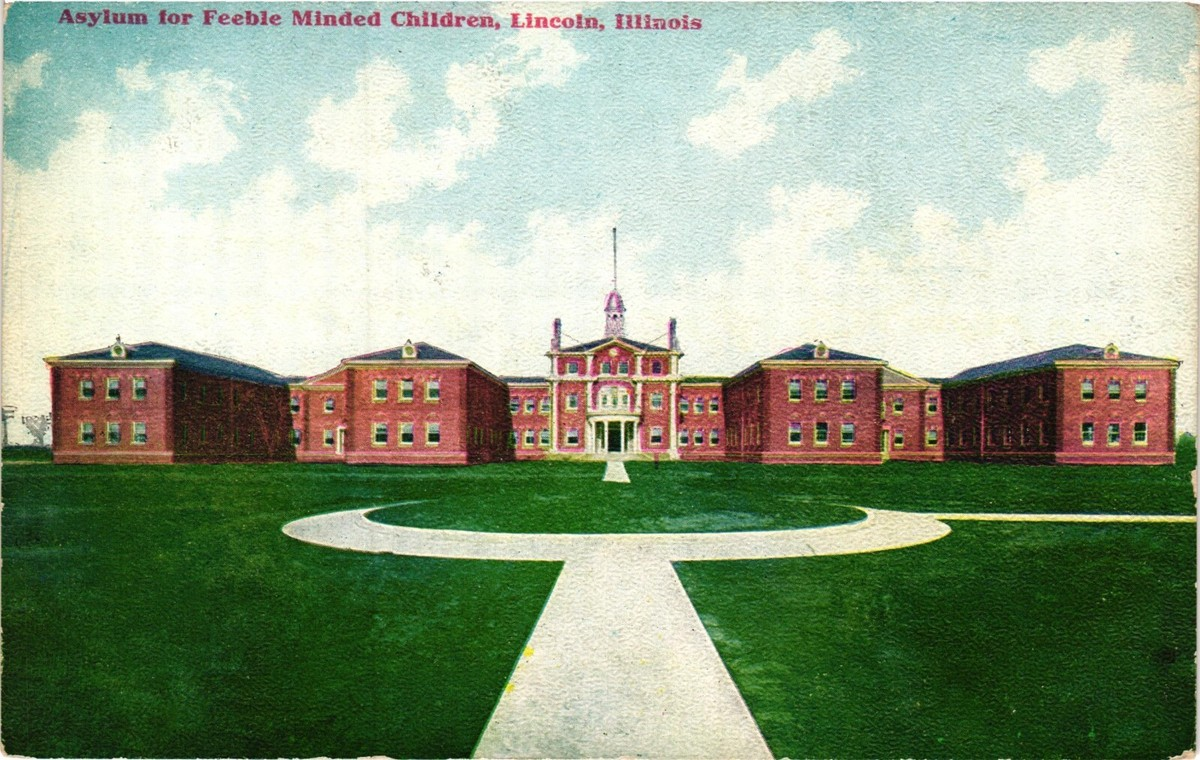
Postcard showing the boys' housing at the Lincoln Asylum, c. 1909

During Darger's time in the Lincoln Asylum, it had a population of about 1,200 children and a staff of over 500. The institution was marked by allegations of severe negligence and abuse toward its children, including one child who died from burns while unattended in a bathtub. Darger was grouped into the higher functioning category of children at the asylum and made to attend school. Although he occasionally suffered physical punishments for misbehavior, he reported that he eventually "got to like the place", noting various friends he made there. When he was about thirteen, he began to be dispatched every summer with around 50 boys to a state-owned farm (often called the State Farm) a short distance from the institution. They were tasked with farm work six days a week. Darger recounted that he enjoyed the work at the farm but disliked being away from the asylum, which he viewed as his home.

Darger was greatly affected by the news of his father's death on March 1, 1908. He reported being in a state of mourning for several months after, spending all of his time alone "in a state of ugliness of such nature that everyone avoided me". He was so uncomfortable with being relocated to the State Farm during the summer that he tried to run away. After a brief failed attempt to run away from the farm in June, he was able to escape by freighthopping with another boy from the asylum and return to Chicago. Shortly afterwards, he was caught in a storm and turned himself in to the police, who brought him back to the asylum. After another brief attempt the following year, he made his fourth and final attempt to escape in 1910. Darger and two other boys from the institution ran away from the State Farm and found work with a German farmer. When he no longer needed the boys as workers, they rode the Illinois Central Railroad to Decatur, Illinois. Darger decided to walk the roughly 150 miles (240 km) from Decatur back to Chicago, often at night due to hot weather and difficulties sleeping.

=== Career and adulthood ===
Arriving in Chicago in August 1910, Darger stayed with his godmother, who helped him find work as a janitor at St. Joseph's Hospital, a Catholic hospital operated by the Sisters of Charity. He was tasked with cleaning both the hospital itself and the attached residences of its nuns. Darger was frequently mocked by the hospital's nuns (his supervisors) who believed he was insane. He recounted in his memoirs being unable to take time off when ill and being threatened with institutionalization by one of his supervisors. Around this time, he began writing fiction in his journals. He may have also made his first pieces of visual art (initially collages) alongside this, or a few years afterwards.

One or two years after his return to Chicago, Darger befriended William Schloeder, a Luxembourgish immigrant. Darger later recalling in his autobiography that he would often spend time together with "Willie" on weekends, often visiting amusement parks. Of the four known photographs of Darger, two show him accompanied by Schloeder, both at a fake caboose photo set located at Riverview Park. Darger and Schloeder may have been part of a "child-protection society" named the Gemini or the Black Brothers Lodge. Featured in a fictionalized form in Darger's work, the group appears to have done little actual work. Its existence is attested through an improvised membership certificate and a letter seemingly addressed to Darger discussing several members of the society and his "Lincoln friends", probably referring to the facility in which he was kept.

Darger made some attempts to adopt a child, possibly seeking to raise a family with Schloeder. In 1929 and 1930, he typed two anonymous notes inquiring about the process; one of these declares that "since the year 1917 he has constantly prayed for a means as it is called for his hopes of adopting little children". From the context in the notes, he appears to have consulted a priest about the process of adopting a child. He was likely considered unsuitable for it due to his lack of a wife or property, and his low income. It is unknown whether he formally petitioned the church to adopt.

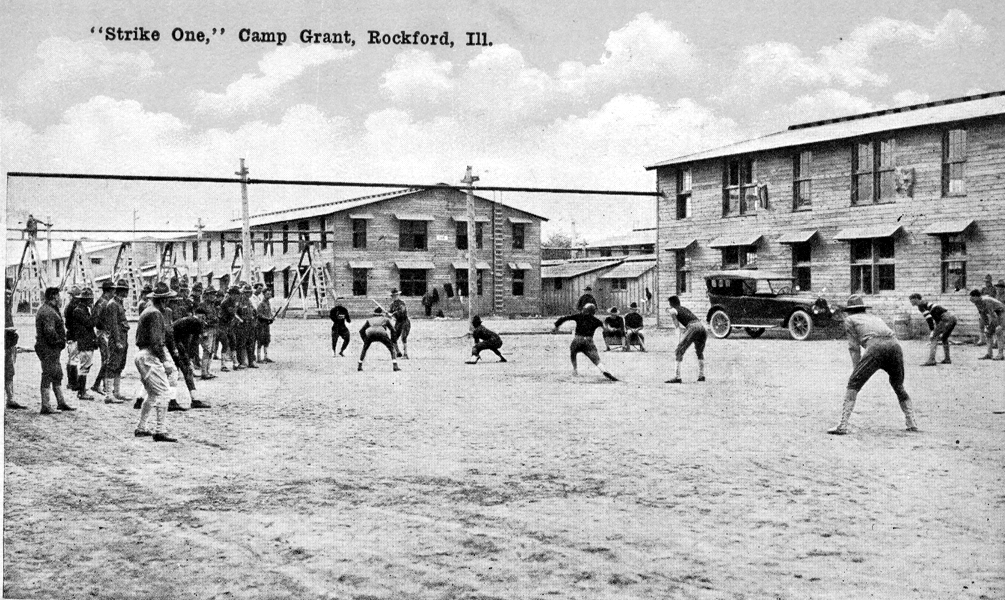
Camp Grant in 1917, where Darger completed his basic training in the United States Army

Following the United States in World War I, Darger was drafted into the army in September 1917. He completed two months of basic training at Camp Grant in Rockford, Illinois, as a private of the 32nd Infantry Division. That November, he was sent to the Camp Logan training camp in Texas. Before the end of the year, he was honorably discharged from the military for vision problems, and he returned to work at St. Joseph's.

In 1922, Darger quit work at the hospital due to poor treatment of him by one of the nuns. He found work at the secular Grant Hospital the following day. During this time, he stayed with a German immigrant family, the Anschutzs, who operated a boarding house out of their home. Six years later, Darger returned to working at St. Joseph's as a dishwasher. He recounted working there through "years of misery" due to an intense dislike of his supervisor but being unable to quit due to the mass unemployment and poor job market of the Great Depression. In 1932, he moved up the street to a rooming house, renting two small rooms on the third floor of the building. He completed his first major written work, In the Realms of the Unreal, around the end of the 1930s. Over the following decade, he wrote an unfinished sequel and experimented with his visual art, greatly enlarging his canvases.

Darger was released from his job as a dishwasher in 1947; a supervisor told him that the nurses had grown concerned that the working conditions had become too difficult for him. However, he was allowed to continue eating lunch at the hospital until he could find a new job. A week later, he was hired at a hospital run by the Alexian Brothers (a Catholic order), where he continued working as a dishwasher, albeit with shorter hours. At some point, the hospital installed a new dishwasher to be staffed only by women. He was initially tasked with washing pots instead, but the hot conditions caused heat illness, and he was switched to a job cutting vegetables for the kitchen.

Darger was seen as a good worker and was given multiple pay increases, but began to face difficulties due to the onset of chronic pain in one of his knees, and he was switched to a simpler job winding bandages. Infuriated towards God for the pain, he began to curse and yell at the deity, at one point shaking his fist at Heaven. He stopped attending Mass. He described "badly singing awfully blasphemous words at God" for hours during hard shifts at work. At some point, he read an illustrated magazine story about an outlaw condemned to Hell and tortured; this frightened him into attending Mass daily and frequenting confession.

In 1959, Darger's rooming house was sold to new owners, photographer Nathan Lerner and his wife Kiyoko Lerner. Initially frightened that he might be evicted, Darger was assured by Nathan that he could continue living in his unit. Schloeder died in 1959, causing Darger great emotional pain. In November 1963, Darger retired due to his worsening chronic pain. He disliked retirement, writing that it was a "lazy life".

Darger was in poverty throughout his life; he probably never made over $3,000 in any year. His poverty only worsened following his retirement. He was reliant on his Social Security income, and as he was no longer able to eat meals at the hospital, he had to frequent nearby restaurants due to the lack of a kitchen in his unit. The Lerners were reportedly protective of Darger, keeping him as a tenant despite suggestions from other landlords that they evict him. The Lerners lowered his monthly rent from $40 to $30 one year as a Christmas present. The Lerners mainly rented to young artists and musicians. Darger was a recluse in his unit; although he rarely socialized with his housemates, they frequently brought him food and cared for him when he was ill. During the late 1960s, he wrote his last major written work, The History of My Life.

=== Discovery of art and death ===
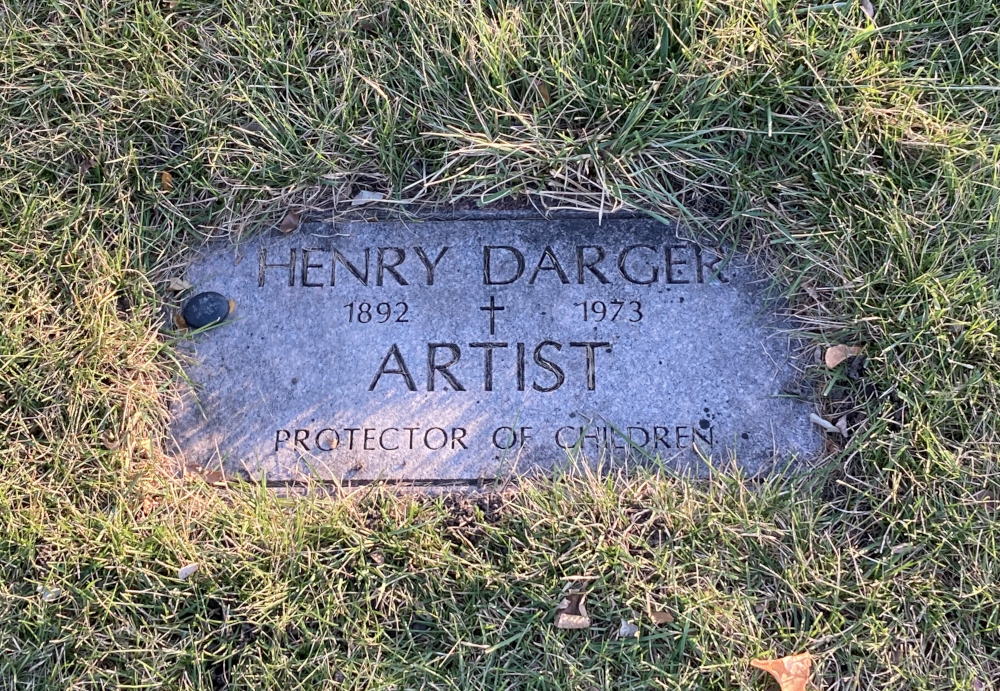
Darger's grave at All Saints Cemetery in Des Plaines, Illinois

In 1969, Darger was hit by a car and spent several months bedridden. Three years later, one of his legs was injured by a hospital cart, and he began to struggle to climb the stairs to his apartment. The Lerners decided to help him move to a charity nursing home; Darger initially refused, but relented and asked them to find him a Catholic care facility. His priest found him a home operated by the Little Sisters of the Poor in November 1972.

The Lerners initially sought to expand Darger's apartment into a rentable unit. They hired David Berglund, another of their tenants, to help clean Darger's apartment as he was moving to the care facility. In November or early December 1972, Berglund discovered three bound volumes of his illustrations. In Darger's trunks, Berglund found his collages and various journals, bound volumes, and loose bundles of writing, prompting him to inform Nathan Lerner of the discoveries. Darger reportedly told Berglund to "throw it all away" when approached about the artwork, while Kiyoko later recalled that he had told them "I don't want anything, they're of no use to me anywhere." Kiyoko reportedly told Nathan to discard the illustrations and manuscripts. After discarding a very large amount of accumulated trash (such as eighty pairs of broken eyeglasses), the Lerners began to sort through his belongings for the artwork. Kiyoko likened the process to a "Mayan excavation". Impressed by his collages and illustrations, they surveyed the room over the following month, and took some pieces of his artwork home.

On April 13, 1973, one day after his 81st birthday, Darger died at his nursing home; this was the same building in which his father had died. He was buried at All Saints Cemetery in Des Plaines, Illinois, initially in a pauper's grave. The Lerners purchased a gravestone declaring him an artist and protector of children and installed it at the site in 1996.

== Art and literary work ==
Darger's body of work includes several books as well as hundreds of illustrations made with watercolors, graphite, and collage. His primary written work is a fantasy novel named The Story of the Vivian Girls, in What is Known as the Realms of the Unreal, of the Glandeco–Angelinian War Storm, Caused by the Child Slave Rebellion, written from roughly 1910 to 1939 (the end date is unknown, but work was certainly completed before 1946). It is accompanied by an unfinished 8,000–page sequel referred to as Further Adventures of the Vivian Girls in Chicago, which he began around 1939. From 1968 to 1970, he wrote a loose autobiography entitled History of My Life, consisting of 206 pages detailing his life, and roughly 4,900 pages telling the story of a fictional tornado named "Sweetie Pie".

Darger had dozens of scrapbooks, in which he pasted images from mass print media to serve as visual inspiration for his art. A scrapbook he titled Pictures of Fires Big or Small in Which Firemen or Persons Lose Their Lives consists of a coloring book in which he pasted newspaper clippings of deadly fires from urban centers in the 1950s and 1960s, as well as various photos of fires and storms. Pencil marks in the book indicate that he traced from the images he kept in the book. From December 31, 1957, to December 31, 1967, he kept a (generally) daily weather journal entitled Weather Reports. By its conclusion, this journal encompassed six notebooks, with later volumes often dedicating one page for each day. In addition to recording temperatures and weather conditions throughout the day, Darger frequently highlights the discrepancies between the local weathermen's predictions and the actual conditions; the third volume gained the subtitle Truthful or Contrary of Weatherman's Reports.

Darger did not attempt to share his art with others, and others were generally uninterested in his personal activities. Only two people reported noticing Darger's illustrations before he was moved out of his apartment. Berglund recalled going into his room and seeing him working on a large painting, quietly singing to himself. Kiyoko Lerner remembered fixing a light bulb in his room and noticing a drawing on his table, commenting "Henry, you're a good artist". Darger reportedly replied "Yes, I am." Schloeder may be the only person with whom he shared any of his work. Although he never tried to publish his work, Darger addresses the "Dear Reader" throughout the Realms of the Unreal, and states that "editors of great experience will in due time be allowed to go over the whole work most carefully". Elsewhere, he asserts that it is the greatest work of fiction ever produced and that it is worthy of publication in the future. It is unknown if he intended an audience for his work. He may have borrowed the addresses to the reader as a literary device from other authors. Art scholars such as Michael Bonesteel and Ellen Handler Spitz have described his work as a psychological defense mechanism, with Spitz dubbing it a "private pictorial tent for his own survival".

=== Novels ===
==== In the Realms of the Unreal ====
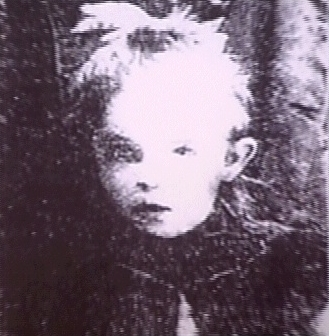
The picture of the murder victim Elsie Paroubek in the May 9, 1911, edition of the Chicago Daily News, the loss of a clipping of which devastated Darger and greatly extended the length of In the Realms of the Unreal

Around the early 1910s, Darger began privately writing what would become a multi-decade literary work, In the Realms of the Unreal. One diary makes reference to a manuscript which was lost in September 1910, which focused on a fictional war dubbed the "Abbysinkilian-Abbieannian war and Tripolygonian war". However, other diaries state that he began writing the work in 1911 or 1912. In 1911, he clipped a picture of the five-year-old murder victim Elsie Paroubek from the Chicago Daily News. He became greatly distressed after losing this clipping, praying to God for its return and growing resentful for its continued absence. He incorporated the loss of the picture into the work through an alternate storyline in which his alter-ego within the story loses a picture of the rebellion's young leader, Annie Aronburg.

For some time after losing the photo, Darger erected an altar to Aronburg in Schloeder's barn, offered novenas, and prayed seven times a day. This continued absence of the photo greatly prolonged the work, which expanded many thousands of pages over the following decades. Darger made ultimatums to God with the threat of depicting great acts of violence and writing in defeats for the Christians.

Described by art historian John MacGregor as "unquestionably the longest work of fiction ever written", In the Realms of the Unreal comprises fourteen or fifteen typed volumes (Note: Including the two parts of volume ten, and potentially the unnamed shorter volume dubbed Volume A.) totaling 15,145 pages. The individual volumes are inconsistent, ranging from 364 to 2,164 pages. Having no experience in bookbinding, Darger improvised using materials such as glue, cardboard, newspaper, and rags. He used a variety of paper sizes, colors, and thicknesses as typing papers, resulting in greatly uneven pages. He also reused flyers and notebooks (most likely taken from the trash) which at times still bear their previous unrelated text. Only the first seven volumes of In the Realms of the Unreal were bound, with the remaining seven or eight volumes found as unbound bundles of loose papers. Darger's frequent reshuffling of portions of the work and a lack of clear continuity in many parts lead to only a loose, tentative order of volumes later reconstructed by scholars. Handwritten material associated with the work has also been found, much of which was incorporated into chapters of the bound volumes.

The plot of In the Realms of the Unreal centers on a great war taking place on a fictional planet a thousand times larger than Earth. Abbieannia and Glandelinia, the primary nations featured, are described as having "hundreds of trillions of men, and many trillions of women and children". Motivated against the evil Glandelinians' use of child slavery, a coalition of Christian nations (Abbieannia alongside Calverinia and Angelina) fight against them in a devastating conflict lasting four years. Beyond the general framing of the war, it is difficult to discern any sustained plotlines throughout the book, although various themes and situations reappear continuously throughout the narrative. The Vivian Girls, the seven young princesses of Abbieannia, are the chief protagonists. Paralleling the American Civil War (one of Darger's main interests), the Vivian Girls fight to free the enslaved children from their Glandelinian captors. Lengthy and extremely detailed descriptions of battles are common throughout the work, abruptly juxtaposed with lighthearted or emotional scenes. Darger also describes many scenes of gruesome violence, featuring girls killed by strangulation or disembowelment.

Indeed the screams and pleads of the victims could not be described, and thousands of mothers went insane over the scene, or even committed suicide... About nearly 56,789 children were literally cut up like a butcher does a calf, after being strangled or slain, in all ways, indeed the sights of the bloody windrows, with their intestines exposed or gushed out, was a sight that no one could bear to witness without losing their reason.

— Henry Darger, In the Realms of the Unreal

The story has two separate endings. The first, in which the photo of Annie Aronburg was found, has the Christian forces defeating and capturing the Glandelinian General Manley, while the alternate ending has Manley escape and rally his troops to repel the Christian armies from the country. Darger's writing features frequent grammatical and typographical errors. Different volumes of the book will abruptly change subject matter between sections, and many adjacent sections appear to have been made years apart only to be inserted together when the book was compiled.

==== Further Adventures of the Vivian Girls in Chicago ====
Beginning around 1939, Darger produced a roughly 10,500-page handwritten manuscript of a sequel to In the Realms of the Unreal, spanning sixteen volumes (of which only the first is bound). It was initially found without a title, leading scholars to give it the provisional title The Vivian Girls in Chicago. Later examination of the manuscript revealed two different names used for the book: Crazy House (called Devil House in Volume 8) and Further Adventures in Chicago. Over 100 manuscript fragments have been found related to the work. A group of Darger scholars, citing his bound registry book, agreed to use the name Further Adventures of the Vivian Girls in Chicago for the work in 2015. Darger stopped work on the draft by 1946, contemporaneously to him finishing In the Realms of the Unreal.

Further Adventures takes place in 1911, the same year that In the Realms of the Unreal begins. The girls are kidnapped by American mercenaries hired by the Glandelinians and are sent to a prison in French Guiana in a fictionalized version of the real world. After escape from the prison, the Vivian Girls flee to Chicago, where they live with their parents and several other characters from In the Realms of the Unreal, including Penrod and Jack Evans. They attend Darger's own church (Saint Patrick) and attend his own school. Webber George, one of the main villains of the story, is a Protestant boy angry at God for not having been born a girl. Many chapters concern Webber George's hatred of the Catholic Vivian family.

Darger depicts some elements of day-to-day life in Chicago, such as street scenes featuring the city's working poor. Although Crazy House does not feature the overarching Glandelinian–Angelinian War which dominates the plot of its predecessor, the story contains a similar amount of intense violence. The latter half of the story revolves around the girls investigating the Sesemans House, which was cursed by Javanese satanists hired by its owner's business opponents. Possessed by Satan, Beelzebub, Judas, Apollyon, Martin Luther, and Henry VIII of England, the house kills children who attempt to enter through means such as a room which turns upside-down and a murderous elm tree.

==== The History of My Life ====
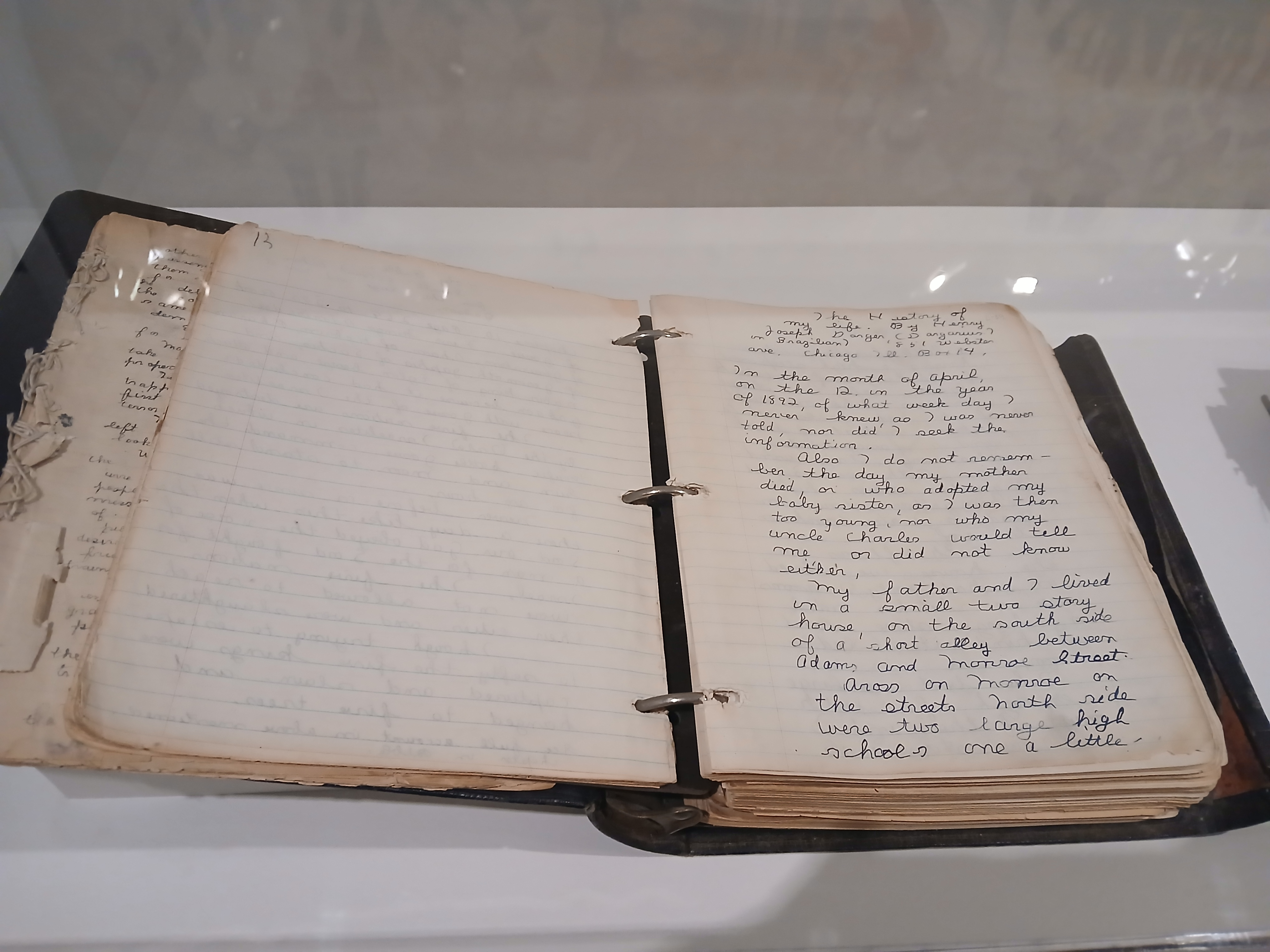
Part of The History of My Life on display at the American Folk Art Museum

Beginning in 1967, Darger wrote The History of My Life, a roughly 5,000-page book spanning eight volumes, of which only a small portion of the first volume actually includes autobiographical information. The first volume consists of a prologue, "Descriptions from the Holy Bible", which is a 36-page biblical commentary which gives descriptions of the books of the Bible. This is followed by a roughly 200-page summary of his life, before beginning a separate unfinished story about a fictional tornado which spans for the remaining several thousand pages.

Darger's autobiographical account gives a timeline of his life and descriptions of his interests. He elaborates very little on traumatic incidents in his life, only briefly noting them. He only once indirectly mentions his artistic works, complaining that he "cannot hardly stand on my feet because of my knee to paint on the top of the long picture". The chronological structure is repeatedly broken by Darger returning to past incidents and giving details he forgot. The second half of the autobiographical portion consists mainly of elaborations on previous portions of the book. After stating "There is one really important thing I must write which I have forgotten" on page 206, Darger diverts towards the introduction of a fictional tornado. Initially introduced as a 1906 tornado he recalled seeing as a teenager in southern Illinois, the story diverts to various accounts by fictional local eyewitnesses over around 1,600 pages. Tornado outbreaks in Chicago in 1967, as well as a rash of deadly Midwestern tornadoes in 1965, may have inspired the narrative.

Much of the description of the tornado consists of repetitive and cyclical scenes of destruction, as the tornado destroys various cities and rural areas. The focus over the next thousand pages shifts towards a massive series of wildfires caused by the tornado, with lengthy descriptions of containment methods for the fire and their logistics. Dangerous smoke clouds emerge, and an underground "smoulder" creates new fires across the region as it emerges above ground. Darger, despite being depicted as a teenager at the beginning, is now described as an adult and leading firefighter. The fires are eventually revealed to have been created by four arsonists resentful about the marriage of a local woman. Around the 2,900th page of the story, the focus returns to the tornado, which is eventually named "Sweetie Pie" and described as taking the shape of a "strangle-headed child cloud". For the following two thousand pages, most of the story alternates between academic panels discussing the shape of the storm and the court trials of both the arsonists and the storm itself.

=== Illustrations ===
Darger produced around 200–300 illustrations, many of which accompanied In the Realms of the Unreal. While sharing its themes and characters, only a select few actually represent events from the story. A location called Jennie Richee is the setting of dozens of Darger's illustrations, but it is only briefly mentioned throughout the story, and nothing of plot significance occurs there. Much of his art is difficult to date, especially his early work prior to 1930. A handful of his illustrations relate to Further Adventures in Chicago, including a depiction of Glandelinian soldiers in downtown Chicago and a portrait of the Vivian Girls floating in the air nude, encircling the Sacred Heart of Jesus.

Untitled painting by Darger, showing a group of primarily naked girls in combat during a thunderstorm

Although Darger had enjoyed drawing and painting since his childhood, he seems to have abandoned it for some time in favor of writing. His first illustrations for In the Realms of the Unreal date to some point between 1912 and 1925, and were hung on the wall of his boarding house room. The earliest pictures were made to depict characters from the book, consisting of overpainted photographs and illustrations mounted on cardboard. The earliest depiction of the Vivian Girls was made during this period, consisting of eight overpainted pictures mounted on a piece of cardboard alongside typed descriptions. He began to produce collages in the mid-1920s, painting over collaged photos of World War I soldiers with tempera. German illustrated news magazines, possibly obtained from his landlords, were one of his main sources of these images. Some of his early collages may have been intended as home decor rather than as illustrations for In the Realms of the Unreal. After making a number of smaller collages, he produced his longest collage piece at some point before September 1929. Titled The Battle of Calverhine, the mural stretches 116 by 37 inches (295 by 94 cm). Darger kept the source material for his work, which later enabled the ability to trace elements to specific works.

During the 1930s, Darger produced single-sheet crayon and pencil drawings of characters, flags, and creatures from In the Realms of the Unreal. Likely believing that he would be unable to draw the human figures properly, he inserted figures into his illustrations using his collection of images (often young girls) cut out from magazines, comics, calendars, sewing pattern illustrations, and coloring books. He included collaged elements alongside traced characters in some of his works. He traced over images using carbon paper and colored them in by painting, at times making modifications with pencil. He frequently rendered the girls as nude or partially clothed, and consistently depicted them with penises. He never mentioned this seeming intersexuality or transgenderness within the story or gave an explanation for why it occurs. When describing the girls' physical appearances in his work, he is preoccupied with emphasizing their purity and beauty.

Nude characters appear more often in Darger's work dating to the 1940s, accompanying a greater frequency of long panoramic scenes. His early panoramas featured multiple of his older narrative compositions on the verso, which were glued together to create a long continuous recto side, which could be either horizontally or vertically oriented. These panoramic compositions could incorporate as many as six different sheets of paper horizontally, or twelve vertically. The construction of the papers from previous works resulted in many polyptychs of unrelated scenes; only rarely did he create series of two connected scenes. In 1944, he discovered that he could order photographic enlargements from a local drugstore, allowing him to vary the size of the images from which he traced, allowing him to create perspective. By the 1950s and 1960s, much of his artwork appeared to have no relation to the story, and he again began to depict clothed figures (often wearing pinafore dresses) more often than nude.

In addition to figures, many of the elements in Darger's later scenes are mostly traced from images found in other works: art historian Mary Trent estimated that around 80–90% of the depicted imagery consisted of tracings from published works. Some girls were constructed by tracing multiple different sources, featuring legs, heads, and bodies. His longest paintings, ranging from 10 to 12 ft (3.0 to 3.7 m) in length, would have been very difficult to view in his 13 by 16 ft (4 by 5 m) room. As such, he likely worked on only a portion of the piece at a time. The stretched proportions used for these paintings are unusual for Western art, drawing comparison to East Asian handscrolls. The common subject matters of the paintings varied over time. During the 1930s and 1940s, he painted many scenes of war and violence. These include what he called "massacre pictures", which feature Glandelinians killing and torturing children en masse. Some depict girls crucified or beheaded, while others feature the disemboweled remains of children after massacres. His later paintings in the 1950s and 1960s feature much less violence, often depicting various children in pleasant landscapes.

== Themes and influences ==
Deeply religious, Darger attended mass multiple times per day in his later years and collected toys, figurines, and cards depicting Catholic saints. He was a devotee of Saint Thérèse of Lisieux, a 19th-century nun who called on the faithful to remain childlike in service of Christ. He incorporated religious imagery from holy cards (such as the Virgin Mary and the Sacred Heart) into his illustrations and collages. Darger's deep interest in weather is prevalent throughout his work; the rise of Glandelinia is accompanied by the emergence of extreme weather events in In the Realms of the Unreal, with characters often remarking on various weather phenomena.

American comics of the early 20th century frequently centered on children and families. Darger clipped from various comics (including Winnie Winkle and Abbie an' Slats) as references, but had a particular fondness for Little Annie Rooney, which became the main source from which he traced the Vivian girls. Tracing and modifying photographic enlargements of the strips to draw characters, he also ordered hand-colored enlargements which he hung on the walls of his apartment. Darger also collected paper dolls as source material, including a book titled Quiz Kids Paper Dolls which he renamed "Book of Vivian Girls". Although the use of cut-outs is common among many other outsider artists (self-taught artists who exist outside of the mainstream art community), Darger's exclusive use of them to populate his drawings is relatively unique.

Although he likely wrote more material than he read, Darger read a wide variety of books. His reliance on bricolage for his art also extends to his written work. Entire chapters of In the Realms of the Unreal are taken from other works with slight modification; appropriated works include the 17th-century Christian text The Pilgrim's Progress and James Oliver Curwood's 1920s adventure novel The Flaming Forest. Darger's writing style shows some influence from classic children's literature, using relatively basic prose interrupted occasionally by more ornate expression. He borrowed characters and situations from children's books such as Heidi, the Bobbsey Twins novels, Alice's Adventures in Wonderland, and The Wonderful Wizard of Oz, as well as comics such as Mutt and Jeff. Uncle Tom's Cabin, an 1852 anti-slavery novel by Harriet Beecher Stowe, is one of the biggest influences on his work; Darger frequently compares killed girls to one of its protagonists, the young Evangeline St. Clare. The character of Evangeline herself appears in The Realms of the Unreal, having converted to Catholicism and escaped from the Glandelinians.

Some scholars have theorized that Darger was homosexual or transgender. He likely had some familiarity with homosexuality—he owned the 1928 book Condemned to Devil's Island, which portrays sexual relationships between men, and he frequently featured cross-dressing male and female characters in his works. Author Jim Elledge, in his 2013 biography Henry Darger, Throwaway Boy, posits that Schloeder was Darger's life partner. Further Adventures in Chicago features an ostensibly male character who wishes they were born female, on which Darger comments that he himself "knows quite a number of boys who would give anything to have been born a girl". Bonesteel theorized that the depiction of girls with penises may point to Darger having had gender dysphoria, although he also suggested that they may be due to a desire to give them a symbol of masculine identity, or that he was simply unaware of female genitalia. His depictions of cross-dressing and transsexual elements may take inspiration from Princess Ozma from the Oz series, a character magically transformed into a boy as an infant but destined to become the queen of Oz.

=== Mental health ===
Scholars and biographers have suggested various psychological conditions that Darger may have been affected by, including autism, hypergraphia (the obsessive urge to write), obsessive–compulsive disorder, dissociative identity disorder, temporal lobe epilepsy, schizophrenia and post-traumatic stress disorder. Early academic study focused on psychobiographical and psychoanalytic analysis of his work (especially of his depictions of violence against children) and his connection to the greater tradition of outsider art. John MacGregor, to whom the Lerners granted exclusive access to some of Darger's material, studied Darger's work under a psychoanalytical lens during the 1990s. He described him as stunted in his understanding of sex and sexuality, without knowledge of penetration or physical sexual differences, and suggested that he was a pedophile. He wrote that the possible influences on his depictions of violence were "too frightening to contemplate," and said he had the "potential for mass murder," summarizing that his art was symbolic of a disturbed mental state. Later, in his 2001 book Henry Darger: In the Realms of the Unreal, MacGregor theorizes that Darger had Asperger syndrome. In his 2000 book Beautiful Fighting Girl, the Japanese psychologist Tamaki Saitō dismissed MacGregor's claims that Darger was severely mentally ill, describing him as isolated and living in a childlike emotional state and comparing him to modern Japanese hikikomori.

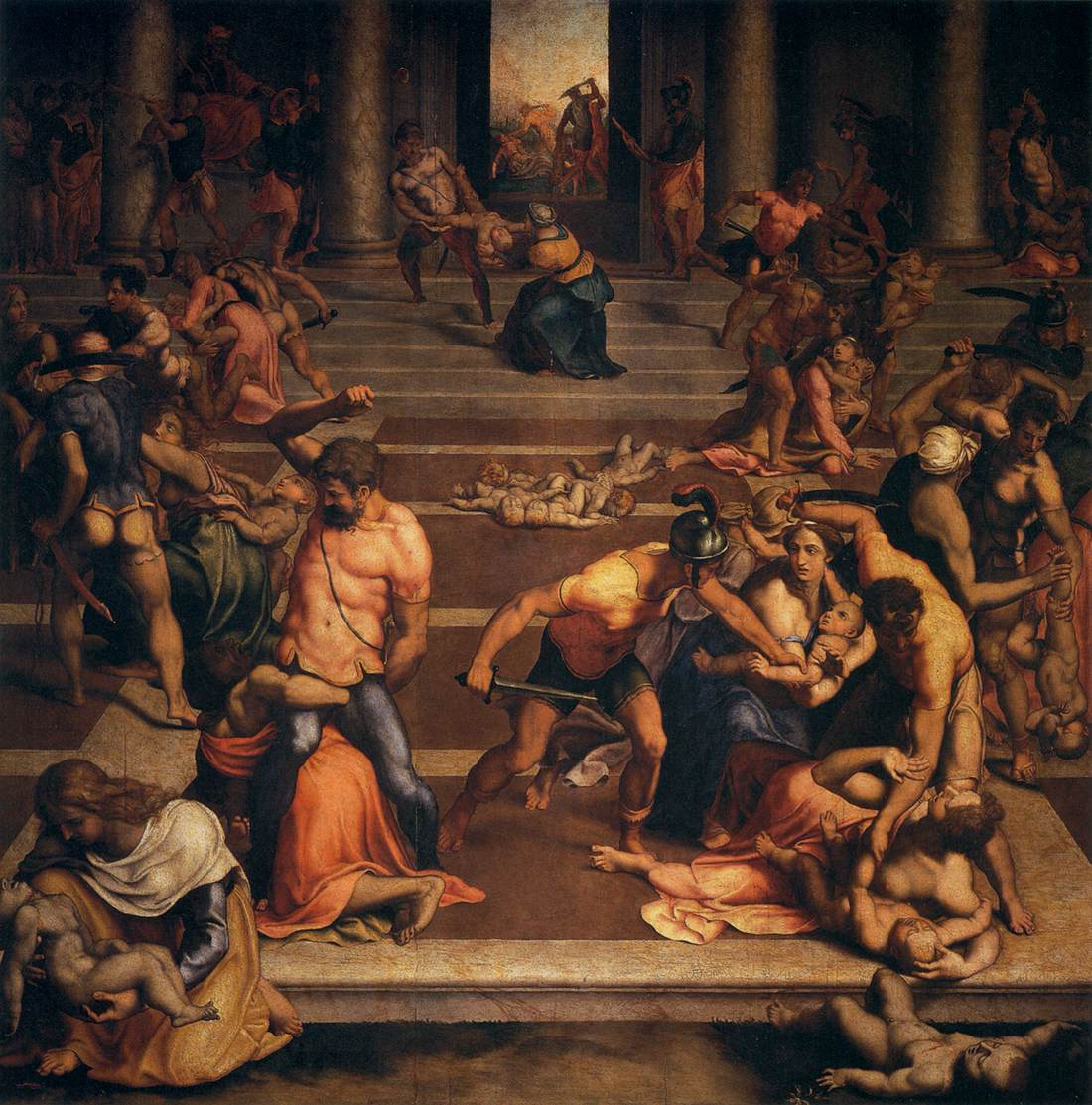
Christian portrayal of martyrs may have influenced Darger's portrayal of violence against children.

Since the early 2010s, scholarship on Darger has generally dismissed the view that Darger was a pedophile or murderer, and has focused less on debating the ethical quality of his work. In a 2012 study, literary historian Michael Moon dismisses a sexual interpretation of his work, arguing that there was likely little connection between his sexuality and his depictions of violence. Moon notes that MacGregor almost exclusively focused on Darger's alleged sadism, never exploring the potential for an origin of the depictions in masochism or childhood trauma. Writing in 2017, Trent similarly dismisses interpretations of Darger identifying with the Glandelinians, stating that it was more likely that he identified with the girl victims. In Henry Darger, Throwaway Boy, Elledge argues that Darger was exploited as a child prostitute and sexually victimized throughout his youth, contending that his books function as a fantastical reimagining of his own youth. Bonesteel also theorized that Darger could have been sexually abused while institutionalized, although he noted that much of Elledge's biography elaborated on spurious evidence and mixed fact with fiction.

Darger wrote that he disliked growing older since childhood and "wished to be young always". He claimed to have been given the nickname "Crazy" by other students during elementary school. According to Moon, it is impossible to posthumously determine whether he was sane or insane; he described him as "very productively unreasonable" and his work as far more influenced by the historical material and pulp fiction he had access to than by his mental state. He theorizes that Darger's frequent depiction of violence against young girls might have had its origins in the frequent depictions of such acts in media coverage of lynchings and race riots during his childhood, while other scholars suggest that they may have been inspired by Catholic depictions of martyrdom, which often juxtapose physical suffering and spiritual transcendence.

== Legacy ==
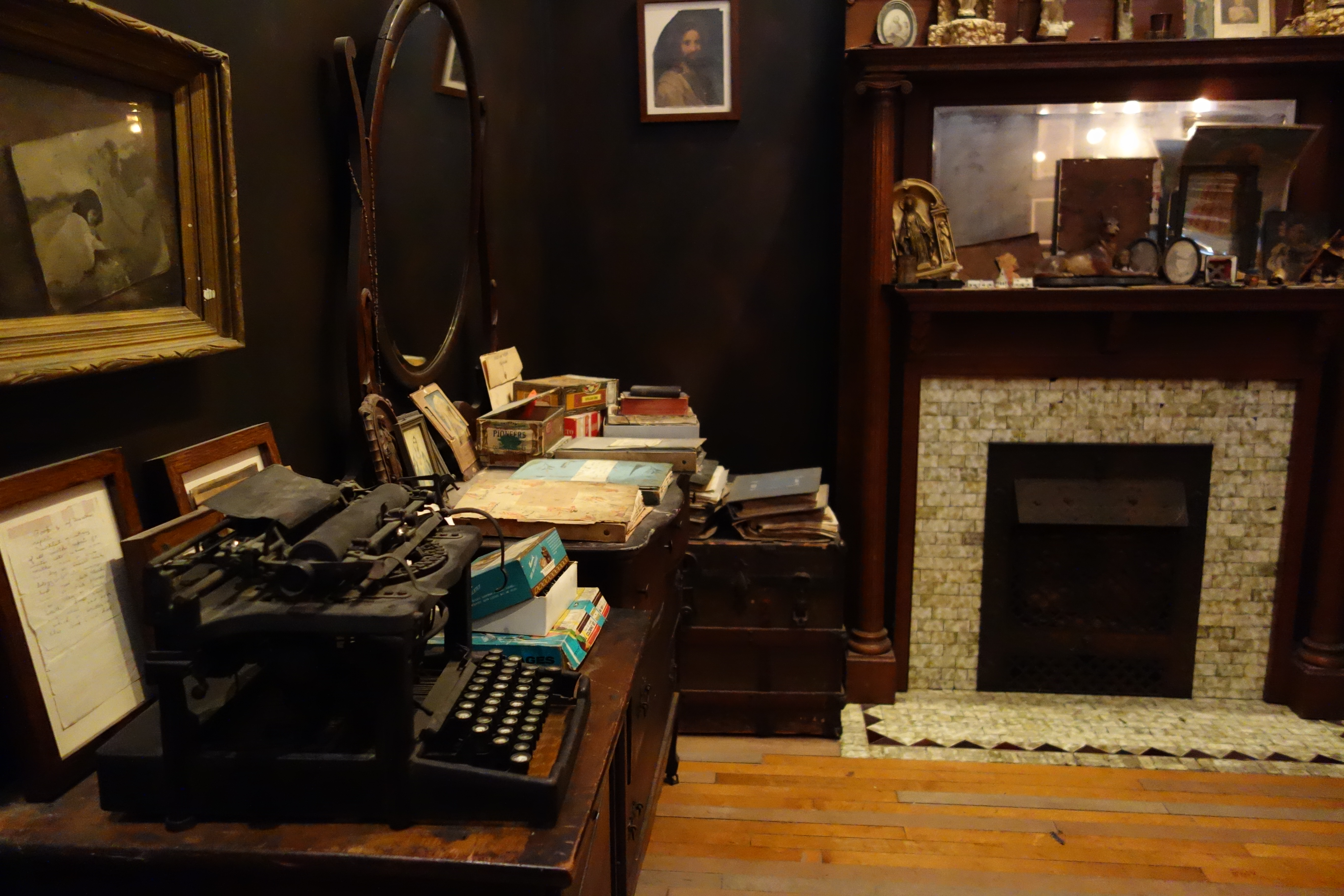
The Henry Darger Room at the Chicago Intuit Art Museum, with furnishings from his apartment

After his death, Darger's landlords Nathan and Kiyoko Lerner managed his artwork, exhibiting pieces and selling some to collectors. Nathan Lerner often showed pieces to friends and curators who came to see his photography. The paintings were taken out of his art albums to enable their display in galleries and exhibitions. The Lerners kept Darger's room largely intact for almost thirty years; Kiyoko said that this was due to their belief that "Henry's spirit was there". They began to receive visits from art students and scholars, and allowed enthusiasts to stay in the room overnight. In 2000, the Intuit Art Museum (a Chicago museum specializing in outsider art) took possession of the contents of the apartment, including many of his sketches, source materials, and furnishings. These were moved to the museum and incorporated into a 3/4th-scale replica of the apartment, which opened as the Henry Darger Room Collection in 2008.

In the decades following his death, Darger became popular with enthusiasts and scholars of outsider art (also known as Art Brut), a movement which celebrates art by self-trained creators from outside the professional art world, often including those with mental disabilities. MacGregor described him as "the single most important example of American outsider art in existence". Such a field did not exist as an appreciable field of art discourse in the United States until the 1960s and 1970s; Trent noted that it would have been very unlikely for his art to find popularity in American art communities for most of his life, especially due to American fears of sexual deviance during much of the 20th century. Whether Darger can be described as an outsider artist is a matter of scholarly debate. His incorporation of pop culture diverges from stricter definitions of outsider art, such as those promoted by painter Jean Dubuffet, which emphasize the eschewment of mainstream culture. Art critics such as Arthur Danto and Robert Hughes praised Darger's work.

Darger's writings are less well-known than his illustrations. They have never been published beyond brief excerpts, and their enormous length and idiosyncratic style have deterred extensive literary analysis. As of 2015, a project existed to publish a 1,500-page excerpt from The Realms of the Unreal.

Auction prices for Darger's work rose steadily after his discovery due to the growing popularity of outsider art. In 1989, one of his watercolors auctioned for 50,000 franc (equivalent to €9,388 in 2023), while a larger panorama reached 500,000 euro (equivalent to €617,022 in 2023) in 2014.

In 2001, the singer-songwriter Natalie Merchant released a song about Darger titled Henry Darger on her album Motherland. Darger was the subject of a 2004 documentary by Jessica Yu entitled In the Realms of the Unreal, which features interviews with his neighbors and Kiyoko Lerner. His work has influenced artists such as the sculptor Grayson Perry (who described him as his favorite artist), the fashion designer Anna Sui, and the poet John Ashbery, whose poem Girls on the Run was directly inspired by Darger. Some of multimedia artist Paul Chan's early works are directly based on Darger, including a 2003 animated piece projected onto a long panorama, intended as a modern interpretation of the work of Darger and utopian Charles Fourier.

=== Copyright ===
During his last year, Darger is alleged to have made unclear and inconsistent statements regarding the status of his work. Berglund claimed Darger told him to throw away all the paintings and manuscripts while he was helping him move. In contrast, when Lerner later visited him at the nursing home and asked about his works, he is alleged to have said "it's all yours, please keep it." (Note: One source instead quotes Darger as saying "It's yours. Just throw it away.") He is also reported to have told a fellow patient at the facility that he was giving his property to the Lerners. Darger's mental health deteriorated in his old age, and he reportedly struggled to recognize Lerner. In addition to the contradictory instructions on what to do with the material, it is unclear whether he was referring to the loose papers and notebooks in his apartments, the bound volumes, or both. He had no known will, most likely dying intestate. Under the Illinois probate code, his estate would have automatically transferred to the closest living heir; he had a number of living relatives through the descendants of his cousin Annie, but they were not tracked down and contacted after his death. His relatives may have been uninterested in a claim even if they were aware of his death, as the estate would have been judged to have little to no value. In this case, ownership would have been passed to Cook County or the state government of Illinois.

None of Darger's works had been registered with the United States Copyright Office by the time of his death. In 1995, the copyright of Darger's work was claimed by Nathan and Kiyoko Lerner. Since Nathan's death in 1997, it has been claimed by Kiyoko Lerner and managed by the Artists Rights Society, a licensing organization. Following a 2019 article in the Northwestern Journal of Technology and Intellectual Property which called the Lerners' claim to the copyright into question, art collector Ron Slattery tracked down Darger's surviving relatives (mainly first cousins two or three times removed). A group of these relatives contested Lerner's ownership in a 2022 federal lawsuit.

=== Collections and exhibits ===
In 1977, four years after his death, the Lerners first exhibited Darger's art and writing (alongside his typewriter and some of his furniture) at the Hyde Park Art Center in southern Chicago. Another early exhibition was made the same year by the Chicago Surrealist Group in Gary, Indiana, where the surrealist poet Franklin Rosemont published the first-ever text written about Darger's work. In 1979, some of Darger's work was featured in an exhibition of outsider art at the Hayward Gallery in London. From 1996 to 1997, University of Iowa Museum of Art director Stephen Prokopoff organized a traveling exhibition of Darger's works, visiting New York, Chicago, and San Francisco, and attracting significant national attention to his work.

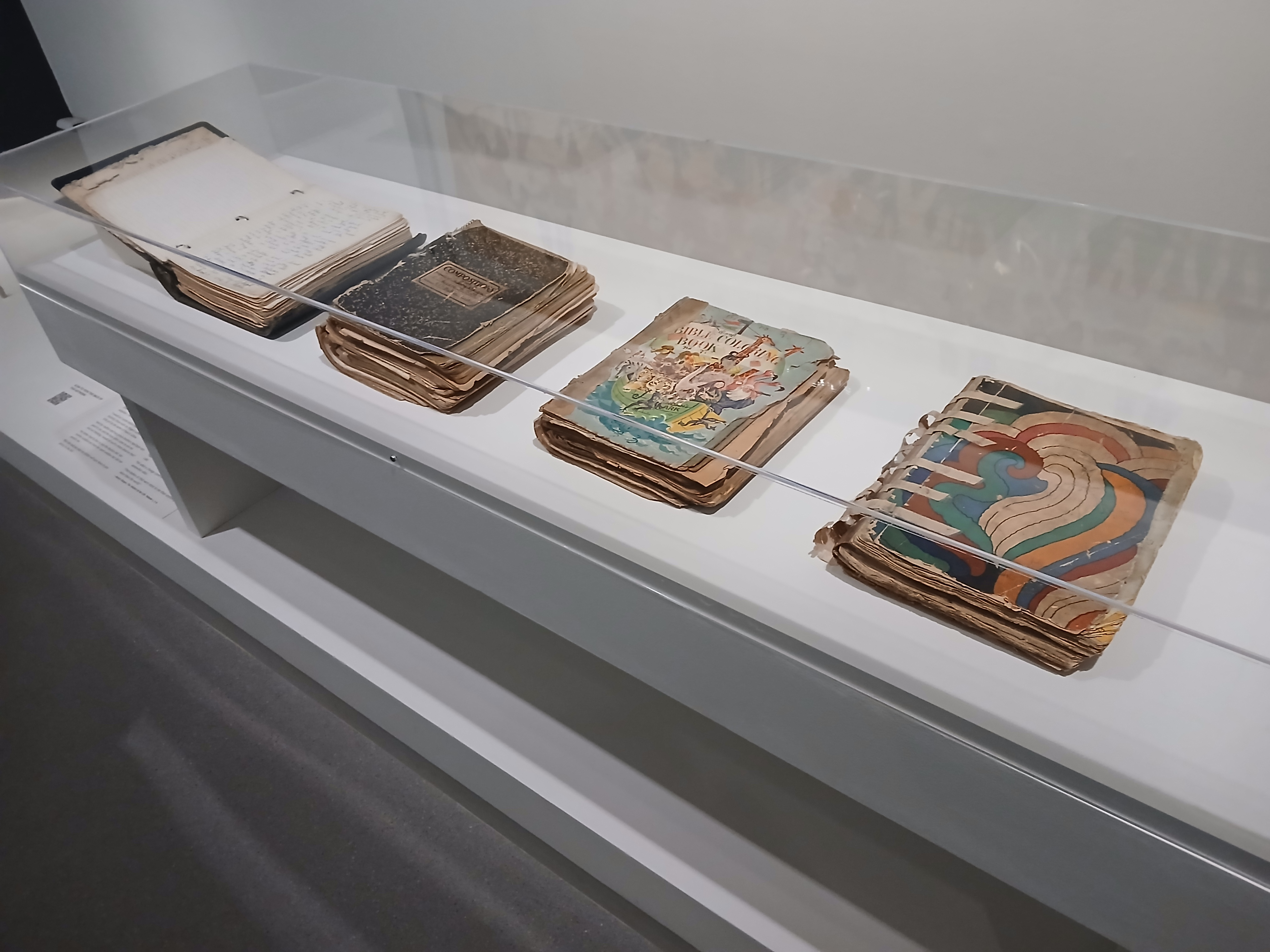
Some of Darger's notebooks on display at the American Folk Art Museum

The largest collection of Darger's works is held by the American Folk Art Museum (AFAM) in New York. Acquired in 2000, the AFAM collection contains the original manuscripts of all three of his major works, his weather report journal, a planning journal used to keep track of characters and events in In the Realms of the Unreal, more than sixty of his paintings and collages, and various sketches, source materials, and personal records. Inspired by the perspective of art historian and curator Klaus Biesenbach, Kiyoko Lerner has sought to promote Darger's art outside the context of outsider or folk art, withdrawing from representation deals from the Carl Hammer Gallery and Galerie St. Etienne (which highlighted self-taught artists) in 2006 in favor of the Andrew Edlin Gallery in New York. The Lerners donated some of his pieces to various other museums, including the Collection de l'art brut (a Swiss museum specializing in outsider art), the Milwaukee Art Museum, the Art Institute of Chicago, the Whitney Museum, and the Museum of Modern Art. In 2012–2013, Kiyoko donated forty-five pieces to the Musée d'Art Moderne de Paris, possibly on the condition that the museum also display a collection of Nathan Lerner's photography. Acquired from this collection, the Centre Pompidou in Paris holds six of his painted panels. The Museum of Everything, a touring exhibition of self-taught and outsider artists, has frequently displayed Darger's work.

Kiyoko Lerner made microform copies of Darger's writings during the 1990s. A digitized version of these is hosted online by the Illinois State Library. A digitization of the bound volumes of In the Realms of the Unreal was done by the AFAM in 2020 as part of the Save America's Treasures program.

== Notes ==
=== Works cited ===
==== Books ====
- Biesenbach, Klaus, ed. (2023). Henry Darger (4th ed.). Prestel Publishing. ISBN 9783791385839.
- Bonesteel, Michael (2000). "Henry Darger: Author, Artist, Sorry Saint, Protector of Children". Henry Darger: Art and Selected Writings. Rizzoli Libri. pp. 7–33. ISBN 9780847822843.
- Bonesteel, Michael (2009). "Henry Darger's Search for the Grail in the Guise of a Celestial Child". In Harrigan, Pat; Wardrip-Fruin, Noah (eds.). Third Person: Authoring and Exploring Vast Narratives. MIT Press. pp. 253–65. ISBN 9780262533799.
- MacGregor, John M. (2002). Henry Darger: In the Realms of the Unreal. Delano Greenidge Editions. ISBN 9780929445151.
- Moon, Michael (2012). Darger's Resources. Duke University Press. ISBN 9780822351566. JSTOR j.ctv11smj8d.
- Parkinson, Gavin (2018). "Henry Darger, Comics, and the Graphic Novel: Contexts and Appropriations". In Baetens, Jan; Frey, Hugo; Tabachnick, Stephen E. (eds.). The Cambridge History of the Graphic Novel. Cambridge University Press. pp. 139–154. doi:10.1017/9781316759981. ISBN 9781316759981.
- Rundquist, Leisa (2021). The Power and Fluidity of Girlhood in Henry Darger's Art. Routledge. doi:10.4324/9780429456886. ISBN 9780429456886.
- Trent, Mary (2017). "Henry Darger and the Unruly Paper Dollhouse Scrapbook". In Brian, Kathleen M.; Trent, James W. Jr. (eds.). Phallacies: Historical Intersections of Disability and Masculinity. Oxford University Press. pp. 44–64. doi:10.1093/oso/9780190458997.001.0001. ISBN 9780190458997.
- Trent, Mary (2022). "Henry Darger's 'Family' Album of American Orphans and Fugitives". In Trent, Mary; Belden-Adams, Kris (eds.). Diverse Voices in Photographic Albums. Routledge. doi:10.4324/9781003157427. ISBN 9781003157427.
- Saitō, Tamaki (2011). Beautiful Fighting Girl. Translated by Vincent, Keith; Lawson, Dawn. University of Minnesota Press. ISBN 9780816654505.
- Umberger, Leslie (2022). We Are Made of Stories: Self-Taught Artists in the Robson Family Collection. Princeton University Press. doi:10.2307/j.ctv2hvfj6m. ISBN 9780691243849. JSTOR j.ctv2hvfj6m.

==== Articles ====
- Bonesteel, Michael (September 22, 2013). "Review: Henry Darger, Throwaway Boy by Jim Elledge". Chicago Tribune. Archived from the original on December 25, 2025.
- Boxer, Sarah (September 16, 2000). "He Was Crazy Like a ... Genius?". The New York Times. Archived from the original on December 30, 2024.
- Ebony, David (April 1, 2014). "Outing Darger". Art in America. Archived from the original on December 28, 2025.
- Jones, Finn-Olaf (April 25, 2005). "Landlord's Fantasy: Henry Darger's Nonrefundable Deposit". Forbes. Archived from the original on October 13, 2025.
- MacFarquhar, Larissa (February 13, 1997). "Thank Heaven for Little Girls: The Lubricious Fantasies of Henry Darger". Slate.
- Moon, Michael (2012b). "In Arcadia with Henry Darger". The Massachusetts Review. 53 (1): 105–112. JSTOR 23210170.
- Moon, Michael (2013). "Otaku for Queer Theory and Media Theory". Criticism. 55 (1): 147–154. doi:10.13110/criticism.55.1.0147. JSTOR 10.13110/criticism.55.1.0147.
- Pierron, Séverine (May 21, 2025). "A Journey into the Heart of the Henry Darger Mystery, Through Virtual Reality". Centre Pompidou. Archived from the original on July 18, 2025.
- Pogrebin, Robin (February 7, 2022). "A Henry Darger Dispute: Who Inherits the Rights to a Loner's Genius?". The New York Times. Archived from the original on August 11, 2023.
- Ramsey, Mike (April 1, 2023). "When Artists Gain Fame After Death, Questions can Arise Over Copyright Ownership". ABA Journal.
- Rundquist, Leisa (2014). "Vivam!: The Divine Intersexuality of Henry Darger's Vivian Girl" (PDF). Elsewhere: The International Journal of Self-Taught and Outsider Art (2). Sydney College of the Arts: 24–42. Archived from the original (PDF) on January 29, 2016.
- Sennewald, J. Emil (2015). "Auf den Spuren eines Getriebenen: Marktwert Henry Darger" [In the Footsteps of a Driven Man: Market Value of Henry Darger]. Kunst und Auktionen (in German) (10): 15.
- Shaw, Lytle (2001). "The Moral Storm: Henry Darger's Book of Weather Reports". Cabinet Magazine (3). Archived from the original on August 13, 2025.
- Thomas, Kevin (January 21, 2005). "'Unreal' and Unrevealing". Los Angeles Times. Archived from the original on September 7, 2025.
- Trent, Mary (2012). "'Many Stirring Scenes': Henry Darger's Reworking of American Visual Culture". American Art: 74–101. doi:10.1086/665630. JSTOR 10.1086/665630.
- Westby, Elyssa (2019). "Henry Darger's 'Realms of the Unreal': But Who in the Realm is Kiyoko Lerner?". Northwestern Journal of Technology and Intellectual Property. 16 (3): 209–224. Archived from the original on December 30, 2024.
- "The Artful Darger". Art on Paper. 10 (1): 12–14. 2006. JSTOR 24556697.

==== Collection catalogues and miscellanea ====
- Anderson, Brooke Davis, ed. (2001). Darger: The Henry Darger Collection at the American Folk Art Museum. American Folk Art Museum. ISBN 9780810913981.
- Biesenbach, Klaus (2004). Henry Darger: Disasters of War. KW Institute for Contemporary Art. ISBN 9783980426534.
- Bonesteel, Michael (2017). Henry Darger: Author/Artist. Intuit Art Museum. ISBN 9780999001028.
- Bonesteel, Michael (2021). "Familiar Darger Characters Feature in Further Adventures in Chicago". Henry Darger: The Room Revealed (exhibition). Intuit Art Museum.
- Gómez, Edward Madrid (2009). Edlin, Andrew (ed.). Sound and Fury: The Art of Henry Darger [Bruit et fureur: l'œuvre de Henry Darger] (in English and French). Edlin Gallery. ISBN 9780977878345.
- Kazarian, Choghakate (2015). "Dictionnaire Dargerien" [Dargerian Dictionary]. Henry Darger, 1892–1973 (in French). Musée d'Art Moderne de Paris. ISBN 9782759602940.
- Rundquist, Leisa (2017). Betwixt and Between: Henry Darger's Vivian Girls. Intuit Art Museum. ISBN 9780999001066. Archived from the original on August 26, 2025.
