= In the Realms of the Unreal =

Unpublished fantasy novel by Henry Darger

- Author: Henry Darger
- Language: English
- Genre: Fantasy
- Publication date: Unpublished
- Media type: Print (seven bound volumes, six or seven unbound volumes, alongside handwritten supplements)
- Pages: 15,145
- Followed by: Further Adventures of the Vivian Girls in Chicago (unfinished)
- Written c. 1910 – c. 1939, discovered 1972

In the Realms of the Unreal (Note: In The Realms of the Unreal is an abbreviation of the full title, The Story of the Vivian Girls, in What is Known as the Realms of the Unreal, of the Glandeco–Angelinian War Storm, Caused by the Child Slave Rebellion.) is an unpublished fantasy work written from the 1910s to 1930s by Henry Darger, an American janitor generally described as an outsider artist. Comprising 15,145 pages in addition to handwritten supplements, the book was described by art historian John MacGregor as "unquestionably the longest work of fiction ever written".

== Background ==
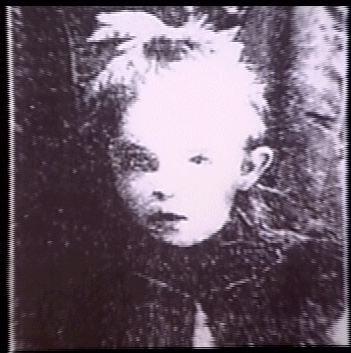
The picture of the murder victim Elsie Paroubek in the May 9, 1911, edition of the Chicago Daily News, the loss of a clipping of which devastated Darger and greatly extended the length of In the Realms of the Unreal and inspired the character of Annie Aronburg.

Around the early 1910s in Chicago, the hospital worker Henry Darger began privately writing what would become a multi-decade literary work, The Story of the Vivian Girls, in What is Known as the Realms of the Unreal, of the Glandeco–Angelinian War Storm, Caused by the Child Slave Rebellion (abbreviated In the Realms of the Unreal). One of his diary entries makes reference to a manuscript which was lost in September 1910, which focused on a fictional war dubbed the "Abbysinkilian-Abbieannian war and Tripolygonian war". However, other diaries state that he began writing the work in 1911 or 1912.

While writing the work, Darger became greatly distressed after losing a clipping of Elsie Paroubek from a 1911 edition of the Chicago Daily News. Darger prayed to God for its return and grew resentful for its continued absence. He incorporated the loss of the picture into the work through the "Aronburg Mystery". For some time after losing the photo, Darger erected an altar to Aronburg in Schloeder's barn, offered novenas, and prayed seven times a day. This continued absence of the photo greatly prolonged the work, which expanded many thousands of pages over the following decades. Darger made ultimatums to God with the threat of depicting great acts of violence in the book and writing in defeats for the Christian armies.

== Description ==
In the Realms of the Unreal takes place on a fictional planet a thousand times the size of Earth. Although the world is said in the introduction to have the Earth as its moon, later references place it as being physically connected to the Earth; the United States is described as being hundreds of thousands of miles away by sea from the book's setting.

Motivated against the evil Glandelinians' use of child slavery, a coalition of Christian nations (Abbieannia alongside Calverinia and Angelina) fight against them in a devastating conflict lasting four years. The Vivian Girls, the seven young princesses of Abbieannia, are the chief protagonists, and throughout the narrative fight to free the enslaved children from their captors. Beyond the general framing of the war, it is difficult to discern any sustained plotlines throughout the book, although various themes and situations reappear continuously throughout the narrative.

The Aronburg Mystery is mentioned throughout the work. Annie Aronburg, a pious girl around nine years old, was among the main leaders of the child rebellion, and a successful military commander. After her assassination by one or more Glandelinians, controversy emerges over the identity of her assassins. Darger's alter ego within the story loses a photo of Aronburg, reflecting his loss of the photo of Paroubek. Her assassin is later named Thomas Phelan Tammerline, after a roommate (Thomas Phelan) who Darger accused of stealing or destroying the photograph.

Aronburg's body is later recovered, found in a miraculous undecayed state. The Vivian Girls are given her internal organs to keep as relics. As a spiritual apparition, Aronburg visits Darger's character three times, admonishing him for turning the work against the Christian nations, noting that "you alone have the situation of both sides in your power."

The story has two separate endings. The first, in which the photo of Annie Aronburg was found, has the Christian forces defeating and capturing the Glandelinian General Manley, while the alternate ending has Manley escape after a feigned surrender and rally his troops to repel the Christian armies from the country. Neither ending is directly continuous with the rest of the story, with scholar Michael Moon describing them as "mutually exclusive possible—but never achieved—endings".

=== Themes ===
Natural disasters, such as thunderstorms, floods, forest fires, tornadoes, and hurricanes, are another common focus throughout the book, often at supernaturally exaggerated scale, as are various poetic descriptions of more mundane weather phenomena. The internal geography and rules of the universe of In the Realms of the Unreal are inconsistent. Darger never produced a general map of the world.

Lengthy and extremely detailed descriptions of battles and sieges are the most common focus of the story. There are thousands of battles described throughout the book, with the descriptions ranging from less than a page to hundreds. These accounts feature descriptions of tactics, logistics, and their impact on civilians. Battles are fought by huge armies sometimes exceeding a hundred million participants, and frequently result in millions of casualties. Glandelinian war crimes are often recounted alongside the battles, with particular detail given to their massacres of children when occupying cities.

=== Style ===
The writing features frequent grammatical and typographical errors. Different volumes of the book will abruptly change subject matter between sections, and many adjacent sections appear to have been made years apart only to be inserted together when the book was compiled. Misspelled words are sometimes terminated early, and followed by the correctly spelled version. In other instances, the words are spelled out fully before a filler word such as "or" or "I mean", followed by the corrected spelling.

== Characters ==
The main protagonists of the book are the seven Vivian sisters: Violet, Joice, Jennie, Catherine, Hettie, Daisy, and Evangeline. Other prominent supporting characters include the sisters' father Robert Vivian (the Governor, and later Emperor of Angelinia) and their uncle Hanson Vivian, the Governor of Calverinia. Jack Evans, an Abbieannian orphan who rose to prominence as a military commander, serves as the girls' guardian and protector.

== Creation ==
Darger handwrote drafts of the work through planning journals for two years. He began typing the work around 1912. He stopped working on the Realms after the late 1930s.

=== Physical construction ===
Darger hand-bound the first seven volumes of the Realms in 1932. The remaining volumes were left unbound as bundles of loose pages. He made leaves by pasting two sheets of typed paper together. These manuscripts also reused flyers and notebooks (most likely taken from the trash) which at times still bear their previous unrelated text. The bound books are very heavy, measuring around 10 by 14 inches (25 by 36 cm), and ranging from 4 to 8 inches (10 to 20 cm) thick depending on page count.

Their pagination is often inconsistent, as is the size of paper used, which frequently alternately between letter and legal paper. Darger's rearranging of the text throughout the roughly twenty years he spent writing has resulted in inconsistent font size throughout the books. The works are always typed in black ink, except for two pages in the unbound Volume VII (also known as Volume XII) has two pages, where all capital letters and punctuation marks are typed in red. This may symbolize the bloodshed described in this section.

Volumes of In the Realms of the Unreal
#	Type	Page count	Notes
I	Bound	644	
II	Bound	915	
III	Bound	1162	
IV	Bound	1577	No obvious continuity with Volume III.
V	Bound	862	
VI	Bound	933	
VII	Bound	1176	
VIII	Unbound	836	The first volume not to be bound. Continuity with the bound Volume VII.
(IX)	Unbound	2164	Also known as Volume C, as it lacks any title page or volume number. MacGregor tentatively labeled it Volume IX.
X, pt. 1	Unbound	862	
X, pt. 2	Unbound	944	Continuity with Volume X, Part 1.
XI	Unbound	908	Has continuity with Volume X, Part 2. This is the last volume numbered by Darger.
VII (XII)	Unbound	1210	Although numbered Volume VII, the bound Volume VII appears to have replaced its position in the story. MacGregor tentatively labeled it Volume XII from text study.
(XIII)	Unbound	652	Also known as Volume B, it lacks a title page or volume number, but clearly serves as the story's conclusion. An alternate ending is included on unnumbered pages.
(A)	Unbound	364	The page count does not include various songs and poems also found within the bundle. As the pages are extremely out of order, this may have been a collection of discarded material.

Handwritten material associated with The Realms of the Unreal
Title	Type	Date	Page count	Notes
In a Child Slave Plantation	Unbound register book	October 27, 1926	328	These chapters were included in Volume IX.
Strange Incidents in St. Claires Plantation	Cloth-bound register book	January 22, 1927	138	Continuous with "In a Child Slave Plantation", these chapters appear in Volume IX.
Did Jannie find out who her master was? Chapter, What is it	Cloth-bound register book	April 1, 1927	136	Continuous with "Strange Incidents in St. Claires Plantation", these chapters appear in Volume IX.
The Plantation is Abandoned	Unbound register book	April 5, 1927	320	Continuous with the volume dated April 1, 1927, these chapters appear in Volume IX.
Mullencat State Calverinia. Explosion, flood, and fire, 700,000 lives lost	Bound register book	November 23, 1927	474	A very large and heavy book noncontinuous with the prior handwritten books, this contains three unrelated sections of text: a section from Volume IX, a very large section from Volume VII, and an unidentified segment of Further Adventures in Chicago.
No. One	Bound register book	N/A	132	Contains two sections: "No. One" is from the Realms, but it is uncertain where it is located in the story, and if it was used. "No. Two" appears to be a segment of Further Adventures in Chicago.
Amazing Phenomena Connected with the Enormous Battle of Dolorine Costellio	Ring-binder pages, held with string	N/A	839	Possibly connected to a much shorter description of the battle included in Volume II.
Unnamed	Ring-binder	N/A	117	Continuous with "Amazing Phenomena Connected with the Enormous Battle of Dolorine Costellio".
Battle of Eva Sainte Claire	Composition book	N/A	Unknown	No other information is available beyond its title.
Please Return this Book to its Proper Place. This means you Henry D.	Register book with broken binding	N/A	Unknown	A planning journal for the Realms, alongside a 92-page segment copied from a Christian catechism. It was used to keep track of characters, deaths, battles, and other events.

=== Influences ===
In the Realms of the Unreal borrows many characters and scenes from existing media. At times, entire chapters from other works are included with only slight rewording or alteration; sections were taken from The Flaming Forest, a 1921 adventure novel about Canadian firefighters.

Children's literature, particularly serial fiction such as the Bobbsey Twins, is a strong and persistent influence on the work. Darger was inspired by The Pilgrim's Progress, a 1678 Christian novel by John Bunyan.

=== Illustration ===
Darger began experimenting with illustrations to accompany the work around the early 1910s, initially creating portraits of the characters through collage and overpainting. These paintings depict scenes and characters from the work, with many of the darker works featuring scenes of mass execution and torture of the child rebels by the Gladelinians.

== Reception and legacy ==
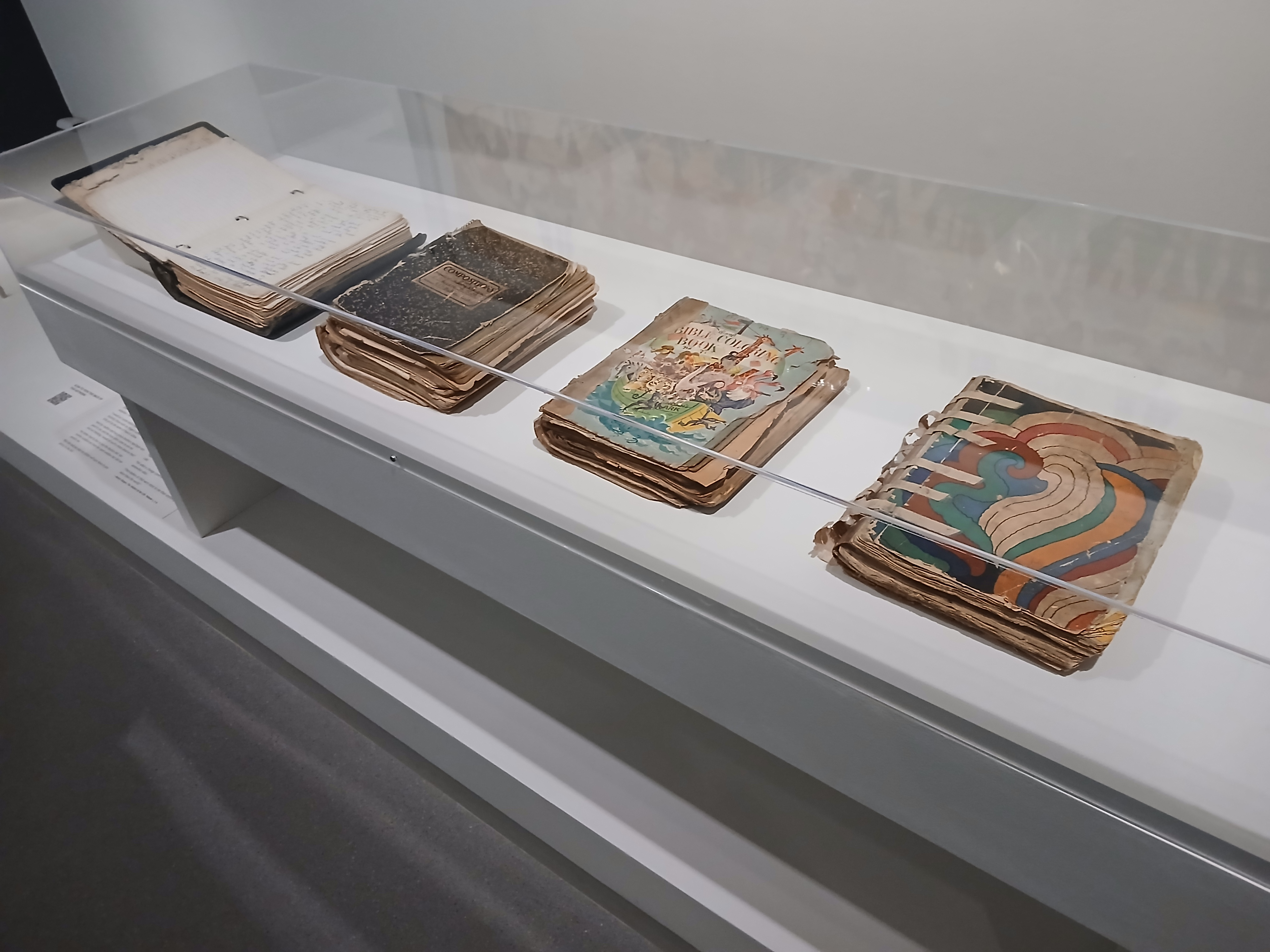
Some of Darger's notebooks on display at the American Folk Art Museum

William Schloeder is the only person known to have been friends with Darger, and is perhaps the only person he showed any of his writing to during his life. The bound volumes were likely seen by no one other than Darger. He is not known to have ever sought to publish the writings or mention them to others. After his death they were stored in his room, with individual volumes only briefly leaving for exhibition.

Early reporting on the book commonly described it as the "world's longest novel", although whether the work can be described as a novel is debated by Moon. When John MacGregor published an overview of Darger's work in 2002, entitled Henry Darger: In the Realms of the Unreal, he stated that no-one had ever read the complete work, as it would involve many years of reading and adjustment to the idiosyncratic style. Darger scholar Michael Bonesteel wrote that Darger's inconsistent writing style has a unique charm and "runs the gamut from poor grammatical constructions to lofty flights of poetic description".

=== Copyright ===
During his last year, Darger is alleged to have made unclear and inconsistent statements regarding the status of his work. Berglund claimed Darger told him to throw away all the paintings and manuscripts while he was helping him move. In contrast, when Lerner later visited him at the nursing home and asked about his works, Darger is alleged to have said "it's all yours, please keep it." (Note: One source instead quotes Darger as saying "It's yours. Just throw it away.") He is also reported to have told a fellow patient at the facility that he was giving his property to the Lerners. Darger's mental health deteriorated in his old age, and he reportedly struggled to recognize Lerner. In addition to the contradicting instructions on what to do with the material, it is unclear whether he was referring to the loose papers and notebooks in his apartments, the bound volumes, or both. He had no known will, most likely dying intestate. Under the Illinois probate code, his estate would have automatically transferred to the closest living heir; he had a number of living relatives through the descendants of his cousin Annie, but they were not tracked down or contacted after his death. His relatives may have been uninterested in a claim even if they were aware of his death, as the estate would have been judged to have little to no value. In this case, ownership would have been passed to Cook County or the state government of Illinois.

None of Darger's works had been registered with the United States Copyright Office by the time of his death. In 1995, the copyright of Darger's work was claimed by Nathan and Kiyoko Lerner. Since Nathan's death in 1997, it has been claimed by Kiyoko Lerner and managed by the Artists Rights Society, a licensing organization. Following a 2019 article in the Northwestern Journal of Technology and Intellectual Property which called the Lerners' claim to the copyright into question, art collector Ron Slattery tracked down Darger's surviving relatives (mainly first cousins two or three times removed). A group of these relatives contested Lerner's ownership in a 2022 federal lawsuit.

=== Archival ===
In the Realms of the Unreal has never been published. The largest collection of Darger's works is held by the American Folk Art Museum (AFAM) in New York. Acquired in 2000, the AFAM collection contains the original manuscripts of the Realms of the Unreal and its planning journal, alongside Further Adventures and Darger's last book, The History of My Life. Kiyoko Lerner made microform copies of Darger's writings during the 1990s. A digitized version of these is hosted online by the Illinois State Library. Another digitization of the bound volumes of In the Realms of the Unreal was done by the AFAM in 2020 as part of the Save America's Treasures program.

== See also ==
- List of unpublished books

== Notes ==
=== Books ===
- Anderson, Brooke Davis (2001). Darger: The Henry Darger Collection at the American Folk Art Museum. American Folk Art Museum. ISBN 9780810913981.
- Biesenbach, Klaus, ed. (2023). Henry Darger (4th ed.). Prestel Publishing. ISBN 9783791385839.
- Bonesteel, Michael (2000). "Henry Darger: Author, Artist, Sorry Saint, Protector of Children". Henry Darger: Art and Selected Writings. Rizzoli Libri. pp. 7–33. ISBN 9780847822843.
- Bonesteel, Michael (2009). "Henry Darger's Search for the Grail in the Guise of a Celestial Child". In Harrigan, Pat; Wardrip-Fruin, Noah (eds.). Third Person: Authoring and Exploring Vast Narratives. MIT Press. pp. 253–65. ISBN 9780262533799.
- MacGregor, John M. (2002). Henry Darger: In the Realms of the Unreal. Delano Greenidge Editions. ISBN 9780929445151.
- Moon, Michael (2012). Darger's Resources. Duke University Press. ISBN 9780822351566. JSTOR j.ctv11smj8d.
- Parkinson, Gavin (2018). "Henry Darger, Comics, and the Graphic Novel: Contexts and Appropriations". In Baetens, Jan; Frey, Hugo; Tabachnick, Stephen E. (eds.). The Cambridge History of the Graphic Novel. Cambridge University Press. pp. 139–154. doi:10.1017/9781316759981. ISBN 9781316759981.
- Rundquist, Leisa (2021). The Power and Fluidity of Girlhood in Henry Darger's Art. Routledge. doi:10.4324/9780429456886. ISBN 9780429456886.

=== Articles ===
- Jones, Finn-Olaf (April 25, 2005). "Landlord's Fantasy: Henry Darger's Nonrefundable Deposit". Forbes.
- McNett, Gavin (July 23, 2002). "'Henry Darger: In the Realms of the Unreal' by John M. MacGregor". Salon. Archived from the original on November 26, 2011.
- Pogrebin, Robin (February 7, 2022). "A Henry Darger Dispute: Who Inherits the Rights to a Loner's Genius?". The New York Times.
- Westby, Elyssa (2019). "Henry Darger's 'Realms of the Unreal': But Who in the Realm is Kiyoko Lerner?". Northwestern Journal of Technology and Intellectual Property. 16 (3): 209–224.

=== Catalogues and miscellanea ===
- Bonesteel, Michael (2017). Henry Darger: Author/Artist. Intuit Art Museum. ISBN 9780999001028.
- Bonesteel, Michael (2021). "Familiar Darger Characters Feature in Further Adventures in Chicago". Henry Darger: The Room Revealed (exhibition). Intuit Art Museum.
- Gómez, Edward Madrid (2009). Edlin, Andrew (ed.). Sound and Fury: The Art of Henry Darger [Bruit et fureur: l'œuvre de Henry Darger] (in English and French). Edlin Gallery. ISBN 9780977878345.
- Kazarian, Choghakate, ed. (2015). "Dictionnaire Dargerien". Henry Darger, 1892–1973 (in French). Musée d'Art Moderne de Paris. ISBN 9782759602940.
- Rundquist, Leisa (2017). Betwixt and Between: Henry Darger's Vivian Girls. Intuit Art Museum. ISBN 9780999001066.
