= Michael Moon =

Michael Moon may refer to:

- Michael Moon (professor), American academic
- Michael Moon (EastEnders), fictional character
- Michael Moon (band), a New York–based alternative rock group
- Michael Jay Moon, co-founder and CEO of GISTICS Inc.
- Michael J. Moon, technician and candidate in the United States House of Representatives elections in Michigan, 2010

== See also ==
- Mike Moon (disambiguation)
