= Beautiful Fighting Girl =

2000 book by Tamaki Saitō

- First edition cover
- Author: Tamaki Saitō
- Original title: 戦闘美少女の精神分析
- Language: Japanese
- Subject: Psychology
- Publisher: Ōta Shuppan
- Publication date: 2000
- Publication place: Tokyo, Japan
- ISBN: 978-4-87233-513-2
- Dewey Decimal: 741.5

Sentō Bishōjo no Seishin Bunseki (Japanese: 戦闘美少女の精神分析; 'Psychoanalysis of the Beautiful Fighting Girl') is a 2000 book by the Japanese Lacanian psychiatrist Tamaki Saitō. It was translated into English in 2011 and published as Beautiful Fighting Girl. Saitō analyzes the psychology of the otaku—a Japanese subculture focused around manga and anime—and its relation to the archetype of the sentō bishōjo ('beautiful fighting girl'), a form of bishōjo ('beautiful girl') character archetype.

In contrast to prior social attitudes which generally saw otaku as socially immature and preferring fiction over reality, Saitō describes them as able to balance fiction and reality, embodied most directly by a characteristic ability to gain sexual release from fictional characters. He dismisses the connection between otaku's perverse fictional attractions (such as lolicon) and real-world sexual deviance, arguing that use of a fictional environment serves as an outlet for their fantasies. Saitō compares it to the works of the American artist Henry Darger, then characterizes the sentō bishōjo archetype as a Japanese phenomenon enabled by the presence of sexuality within manga and anime. He argues that the archetype represents a "phallic girl" and fosters attraction among the audience by embodying the traits of the metaphorical phallus.

The book inspired a monograph analysis of otaku by scholar Hiroki Azuma in response to Saitō's claims the following year, which dismisses Saitō's focus on sexuality, arguing that otaku instead forgo sexuality in favor of an animalistic attraction to moe qualities. The 2011 English translation of the book features a lengthy foreword which defends the work as useful to a variety of disciplines. Academic responses have generally critiqued Saitō's avoidance of discussion on female otaku and disputed his claims that the 'beautiful fighting girl' is a Japanese archetype.

== Background and publication history ==
Beginning in the 1980s, Japanese male fans of shōjo manga and anime (aimed at adolescent girls) began to be referred to as otaku ('your house'). This was initially a polite and deferential pronoun, but became a somewhat derogatory term similar to the English nerd, but often connoting obsessiveness and feelings of desire towards the characters in fictional works. This term later broadened to a wider variety of fans of anime and manga, including women. This was seen as a deviation from the primary genre of adult comics at the time, the generally realistic and masculine gekiga. Adapted from shōjo manga emerged the bishōjo ('beautiful girl') character archetype within works aimed at male audiences. Patrick W. Galbraith wrote that such characters are often characterized as "cute".

Some social commentators during the 1980s considered otaku to be socially and sexually immature, unable to accept reality and adulthood. Their attraction to cute girl characters became described as lolicon (shortened from 'Lolita complex'), a term also applied to anime and manga which catered to such attractions, and often correlated to pedophilia. An analysis of otaku media consumption was produced by ethnographer Eiji Ōtsuka in 1989, entitled Monogatari shōhiron: "Bikkuriman" no shinwagaku ('On Narrative Consumption: Studies in the 'Bikkuriman' Myth'). He focuses on otaku's drive to construct grand narratives from smaller narratives throughout a work, which allows themselves to be immersed into a piece of media. By the 1990s, attitudes towards otaku varied widely; some viewing them as potentially violent and unstable, and others viewed them as fostering a subculture which accepted alienated youth and spread the prominence of Japanese media internationally.

The 2000 book Sentō Bishōjo no Seishin Bunseki (戦闘美少女の精神分析; 'Psychoanalysis of a Fighting Girl') was written by Tamaki Saitō, a Japanese Lacanian psychiatrist with an interest in media culture and criticism. In the work, Saitō analyzes the psychology of otaku and analyzes their sexuality in relation to the sentō bishōjo ('beautiful fighting girl') archetype. It was published by the Tokyo firm Ōta Shuppan, and was republished in 2006 by Chikuma Bunko as a paperback with a new foreword. In 2011, an English translation produced by J. Keith Vincent and Dawn Lawson was published by the University of Minnesota Press.

== Summary ==
In the first chapter, Saitō begins to analyze otaku psychology and culture. He summarizes and critiques the descriptions of the identity by writers such as Akio Nakamori and Toshio Okada, and presents his own definition of an otaku, disputing their common characterization as immature or psychologically undeveloped. He argues that instead of preferring fiction over reality, they accept fictional worlds as separate equivalents to it, "finding reality in both fiction and reality". He describes the creation of desire in the audience as essential to making a fictional world seem real, writing "once that world takes on a sexual charge, it will attain a level of reality no matter how shoddily it is drawn".

The second chapter analyzes a case study, an email from a young adult otaku describing his sense of empowerment from being able to control fictional characters within an imagined sexual context. To Saitō, sexuality is a core aspect of otaku psychology, writing that the ability to gain sexual release from fictional characters is the core difference between otaku and other forms of fan. He argues that this can coexist with conventional, real-world sexuality, as the fictional environment can provided an outlet for what he describes as perverse fantasies. The following chapter analyzes the sentō bishōjo archetype and compares representation of similar characters within Japanese and Western popular media, featuring anecdotes from self-described otaku in the United States. Saitō argues that the sentō bishōjo is a phenomenon exclusive to Japanese media, designed to "pervert and make a profit". Conversely, he cites Western psychologists to reaffirm that fictional sexual deviance does not affect real-life sexual actions.

The fourth chapter is a case study of Henry Darger, an American artist and writer who created a massive volume of work centered around the revolt of child slaves, facing torture and mass killings by their former masters. Saitō aims to dispel the interpretations of Darger as a sadistic pedophile by contemporary scholars. Using Darger's work as an example, Saitō argues that the "beautiful fighting girl" archetype is created by the effect of popular media on an adolescent mindset. Saitō posits that the presence of penises on the young girls in Darger's work represents a rejection of castration, a symptom of Darger's continued adolescent mentality.

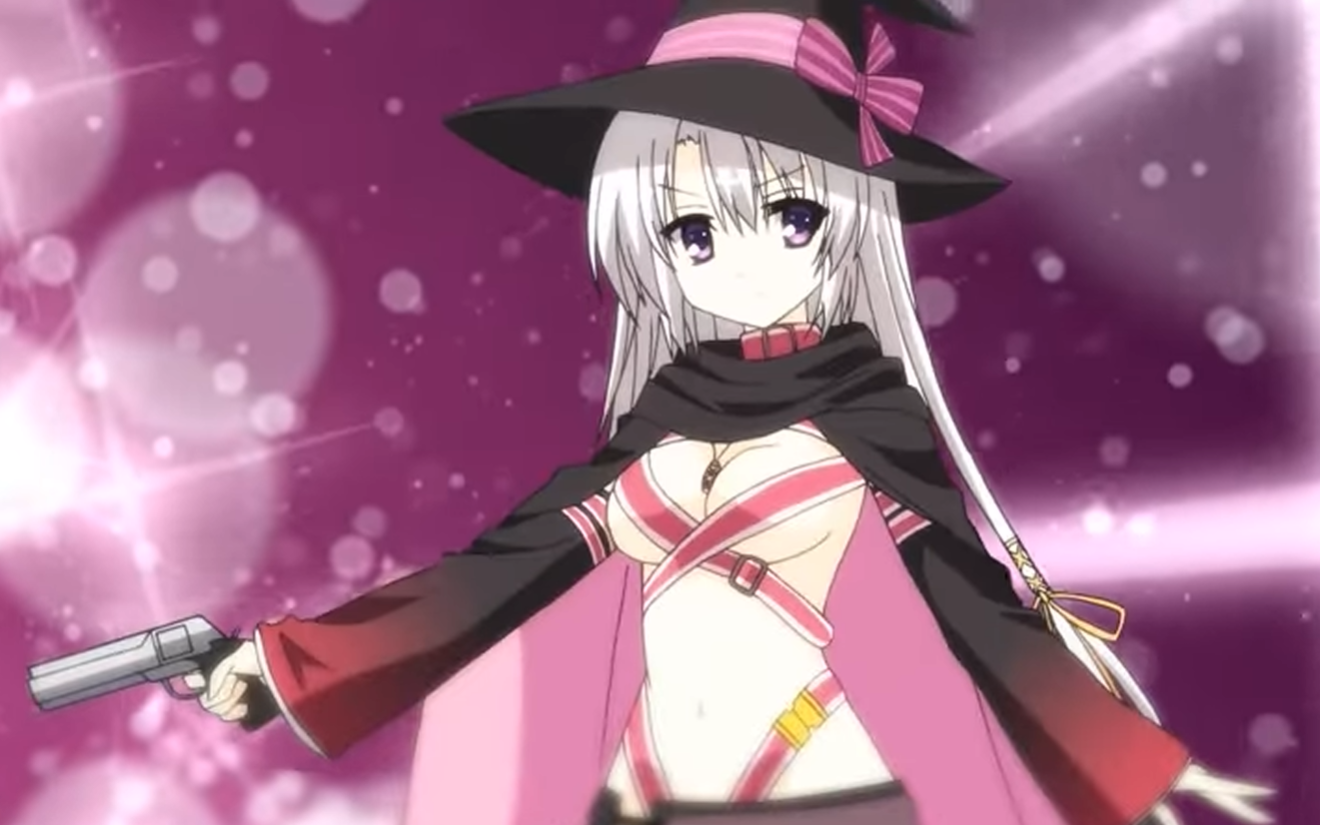
In the book, Saitō examines the sentō bishōjo ("beautiful fighting girl") archetype (example pictured) in the context of otaku sexuality and culture.

A genealogy and history of the "beautiful fighting girl" within Japanese popular culture from the 1960s to the 1990s occupies most of the fifth chapter. Saitō delineates thirteen subgenres or lineages of sentō bishōjo fiction. He argues for the distinction of the sentō bishōjo to Japan, dismissing western heroines as unrepresentative of it, and claims that Japan represented sexuality within animation, which allowed the archetype to form. He argues that the sentō bishōjo figure has spread from Japan since the 1990s, and predicts that it will become a global phenomenon.

The final chapter, entitled "The Emergence of the Phallic Girls", continues Saitō's argument for the sentō bishōjo as a Japanese figure, characterizing manga and anime as a representative form with no direct equivalent within other countries' popular culture. He outlines the psychological concept of a "phallic girl" and a "phallic mother". Phallic mothers are figures which adopt an authoritarian role (thus possessing a "metaphorical penis") due to trauma, leading to empathy from the audience which fosters attraction. In contrast, the phallic girl (a category which includes sentō bishōjo) are hollow figures free from trauma; this leads the characters to achieve jouissance through fighting, thus embodying the traits of the metaphorical penis themselves, cultivating interest and erotic attraction from the audience.

The 2011 English translation features an extensive introduction by Vincent, as well as Saitō's afterwords to the two prior editions and a commentary essay by the critic and philosopher Hiroki Azuma. In his introduction, Vincent describes Beautiful Fighting Girl as a "baggy monster of a book" but defends it as a useful work, emphasizing its potential value to disciplines such as queer theory.

== Reception ==
Azuma responded to Beautiful Fighting Girl the following year with his own monograph, Dōbutsukasuru Postmodern: Otaku kara mita Nihon Shakai ('The Animalizing Postmodern: Looking at Japanese Society Through Otaku'). Azuma rejects Saitō's focus on otaku sexuality, arguing instead that otaku have rejected the intersubjective experience of sexuality in favor of an animalistic attraction to moe qualities in the media they consume. In a 2002 discussion with Saitō, Azuma argued that "masturbating to a picture doesn’t add up to anything", claiming that it was more similar to self-soothing behaviors like thumb sucking than conventional sexuality.

A 2012 review by Paul T. Beattie in the Journal of the Fantastic in the Arts criticized the book for what he described as "uncompromising adherence to an arguably outdated model of Lacanian psychoanalysis". Beattie also characterized the book as Japanocentric for dismissing examples of "beautiful fighting girls" in North American and European works. Raechel Dumas described this focus on Japan as inconsistent and poorly-researched, pointing to the extensive discussion of Darger, as well as Saitō's denial that sexualized women existed in pre-1990s American animated media; she praised the book's fifth chapter for its genealogy of the fighting girl archetype.

Several scholars criticized a lack of coverage of female otaku in the work. In 2013, Michael Moon wrote there was a lack of consideration of female otaku, with Saitō briefly mentioning them to discuss their attachment to the genres of yaoi and shotacon, and described his analysis of Darger's sexuality as lacking in nuance and focused on a defense against charges of sadism and pedophilia, a viewpoint which became outdated among Darger scholars since the initial publication of the work. The scholar Kathryn Hemmann said that Saitō's characterization of bishōjo being unrelated to real women ignores characters such as Sailor Moon, whom she argued positively influence the attitudes of young female fans towards both themselves and other female characters.
