= JTIP =

JTIP may refer to:

- Northwestern Journal of Technology and Intellectual Property
- Tulane Journal of Technology and Intellectual Property
