= Northwestern law review =

Northwestern Law Review may refer to:

- Northwestern University Law Review
- Northwestern Journal of Technology and Intellectual Property
- Northwestern University Law Review Colloquy
- Journal of Criminal Law & Criminology
