= Mike Moon =

Mike Moon may refer to:

- Mike Moon (musician) (born 1968), Swedish guitarist for King Diamond
- Mike Moon (politician) (born 1958), American Republican member of the Missouri House of Representatives
- Mike Moon (animator), American animator who worked on House of Mouse and Foster's Home for Imaginary Friends, and founder of Moonlight

== See also ==
- Michael Moon (disambiguation)
