= Girls on the Run (poem) =

1999 book-length poem

- First edition
- Author: John Ashbery
- Cover artist: Henry Darger - 'Storm Brewing'
- Language: English
- Publisher: Farrar, Straus and Giroux
- Publication date: 1999
- Publication place: United States
- Pages: 55
- ISBN: 0374162700

Girls on the Run is a long poem by the American writer John Ashbery, published in its own volume in 1999. The narrative centers on a group of girls known as the Vivians, who try to create an ideal world for themselves. The poem was inspired by the works of Henry Darger, a Chicago-based outsider artist who, among other things, collected street waste, compiled various catalogues, and wrote a massive fantasy novel.

== Reception ==
David Kirby of The New York Times described Girls on the Run as "a tank of literary laughing gas that exhilarates and confounds in roughly equal measure." Kirby wrote that "the excitement stays just below the level of video-arcade intensity, thanks to the anesthesizing influence of a narrator who is both wide-eyed and disembodied ...If Andy Warhol and T. S. Eliot had played with Barbies together, the result might have been something like the adventures of Dimples, Shuffle, Tidbit and the rest of the Vivians: theirs is a world of the eternal present, a place where the ordinary is nifty and vice versa, and any possibility of a tight ending scampers away into a candy-colored sunset." John D'Agata reviewed the book in Boston Review: "There is an innocence to reading this new book that readers may have long felt the presence of in past books by Ashbery; but like the surreal physical landscape in this particular poem, it is an innocence that feels also long out of reach. Like Henry Darger's obsessive (some would say phallocentric) cataloguing of kinds of tornadoes, military ranks, flags of the world, or ways to kill a girl, John Ashbery's proclivities for lists, long sentences, and ambiguous grammar is a trademark system for distorting reality–but all in an effort to dig closer to the real. Indeed, as one critic recently called the poet's slippery tactics: 'It is a fear of death ... death without a comforting narrative for reproductive continuation.'"

== See also ==
- 1999 in poetry
- American literature
