= In the Realms of the Unreal (film) =

2004 documentary film

- Directed by: Jessica Yu
- Written by: Jessica Yu
- Produced by: Susan West; Joan Huang
- Starring: Larry Pine; Frier McCollister; Wally Wingert; Janice Hong
- Narrated by: Dakota Fanning
- Cinematography: Russell Harper
- Edited by: Jessica Yu
- Music by: Jeff Beal
- Distributed by: Forward Entertainment; Mongrel Media; Wellspring Media
- Release date: 2004
- Running time: 81 minutes
- Country: United States
- Language: English

In the Realms of the Unreal is a 2004 American documentary film written and directed by Jessica Yu about American outsider artist Henry Darger (1892–1973).

== Summary ==
An obscure janitor during his life, Henry Darger is known for the posthumous discovery of his elaborate 15,145-page fantasy manuscript entitled The Story of the Vivian Girls, in What is Known as the Realms of the Unreal, of the Glandeco-Angelinnian War Storm, Caused by the Child Slave Rebellion, along with several hundred watercolor paintings, collages and other drawings illustrating the story.

== Content ==
The film's style is atypical of a documentary. Because there are only three known photographs of Darger, and because of his reclusive lifestyle, the film is mostly a narrated biographical account, accompanied by animated versions of events from his magnum opus, which is also surveyed in detail. Interviews with his few neighbors and other acquaintances are included. The film's narrator Dakota Fanning was 10 years old when she narrated the film.

== Reception ==
The film has a 70% rating on Rotten Tomatoes and a score of 74 on Metacritic.

== Accolades ==
The film won the National Film Board Award for Best Documentary at the 2004 Vancouver International Film Festival while it was also nominated for Best Documentary Screenplay from the Writers Guild of America and a Gotham Award for Best Documentary.
