= The Museum of Everything (museum) =

The Museum of Everything is a non-profit organisation and platform which stages installations of art by private, self-taught and non-academic art-makers (sometimes referred to as art brut or outsider art). The museum was founded in 2009 by James Brett.

== Establishment and description ==
The Museum of Everything staged its first exhibition in London in October 2009. It then continued to present large-scale surveys at different locations around the world, working within and alongside partner institutions and organisations.

The first location for The Museum of Everything was a former dairy and recording studio in Primrose Hill, London. It was here that it first staged its celebrated exhibitions (2009/2010). The Museum of Everything then travelled to other venues, including: Selfridges, the department store and former hotel in London (2011); Chalet Society, a temporary space in Boulevard Raspail, Paris (2012/13); and Serra dei Giardini, Venice (2013) as part of the 55th Venice Biennale. The Museum of Everything also created installations at public and private museums, including: Tate Modern, London (2010); Pinacoteca Agnelli, Turin (2010); Garage, Moscow (2012); Hayward Gallery, London (2013); Kunsthal Rotterdam, Rotterdam (2016); and Museum of Old and New Art, Tasmania (2017/18).

The museum has described the material on display as "untrained, unintentional, undiscovered and unclassifiable". More importantly, it rejects much of the terminology of otherness, notably that of "outsider art". Exhibitions are generally surveys of material from makers around the world. The 2017/2018 exhibition at Mona in Tasmania presented almost 2,000 artworks by over 100 artists.

== Exhibits ==
- The Museum of Everything was an Official Participant in the 2013 Venice Biennale.
- The Museum of Everything exhibited at the Kunsthal in Rotterdam in 2016.
- The Museum of Everything exhibited at the Museum of Old and New Art in 2017.

== Artists included in the exhibitions ==
The Museum of Everything presents works by hundreds of artists, including:

- Henry Darger
- George Widener
