= Tamaki Saitō =

Japanese psychologist and critic (born 1961)

Tamaki Saitō (斎藤 環, Saitō Tamaki; born September 24, 1961) is a Japanese psychologist and critic. He specializes in the psychiatry of puberty and adolescence. Saitō is Director of Medical Service at Sofukai Sasaki Hospital in Funabashi, Chiba.

Saitō is notable for his study of hikikomori, a term he coined; he is internationally recognized as Japan's leading hikikomori expert. He is also known for presenting the theory of "multiple orientations" to explain otaku sexuality in Beautiful Fighting Girl. Since the 2010s, he has been involved in introducing Open Dialogue in Japan.

== Personal history ==
Saito was born in Kitakami, Iwate. In 1980, he graduated from Morioka First High School and matriculated into the University of Tsukuba the same year; graduating in 1986 from the medical faculty with a specialization in Environmental Ecology. In 1990, he completed a doctoral course in medicine under the leadership of Hiroshi Inamura.

== Publications ==
- Bunmyakubyō--Lacan/Bateson/Maturana (文脈病――ラカン/ベイトソン/マトゥラーナ), Context disease--Lacan/Bateson/Maturana 1998
- Shakaiteki hikikomori--Owaranai Shishunki (社会的ひきこもり――終わらない思春期), Social withdrawal--Adolescence without End 1998
- Sento bishojo no seishinbunseki (戦闘美少女の精神分析), Psychoanalysis of Beautiful Fighting Girl 2000
- Gekiron! hikikomori (激論！ひきこもり), Argument! hikikomori (co-authored with Sadatsugu Kudo) 2001
- 'Hikikomori' kyushutu manual (「ひきこもり」救出マニュアル), 'Hikikomori' rescue manual 2002
- OK? Hikikomori OK! (OK?ひきこもりOK!), OK? Hikikomori OK! 2003
- Hikikomori bunkaron (ひきこもり文化論), On Hikikomori culture 2003
- Kairi no pop skill (乖離のポップ・スキル), Pop skill of Dissociation 2004
- Bungaku no choukou (文学の徴候), Symptom of the literature 2004
- Ikinobiru tame no Lacan (生き延びるためのラカン), Lacan for survival 2006
- Media ha sonzai shinai (メディアは存在しない), Media does not exist 2007
- Artist wa kyokaisenjou de odoru (アーティストは境界線上で踊る), Artists dance on the borderline 2007
- Bungaku no dansou--Sekai/Shinsai/Character (文学の断層――セカイ・震災・キャラクター) Dislocation of the literature--Sekai/Disaster/Character 2008
- Kankei no kagaku toshite no bungaku (関係の化学としての文学), Literature as chemistry of relationships 2009
- Bungaku no seishinbunseki (「文学」の精神分析), Psychoanalysis of 'Literature' 2009
- Hikikomori kara mita mirai--SIGN OF THE TIMES 2005−2010 (ひきこもりから見た未来――SIGN OF THE TIMES 2005−2010) The future seen from hikikomori--SIGN OF THE TIMES 2005−2010 2010
- Character seishinbunseki (キャラクター精神分析) Character psychoanalysis 2011

Translation in English

- Saitō, Tamaki (2007) "Otaku Sexuality" in Christopher Bolton, Istvan Csicsery-Ronay Jr., and Takayuki Tatsumi ed., Robot Ghosts and Wired Dreams. Minneapolis: University of Minnesota Press. ISBN 978-0-8166-4974-7 (with a foreword by Mari Kotani)
- Saitō, Tamaki (2009) "The Asymmetry of Masculine/ Feminine Otaku Sexuality: Moe, Yaoi and Phallic Girls" in Ayelet Zohar, ed., Postgender: Gender, Sexuality and Performativity in Japanese Culture. Newcastle upon Tyne: Cambridge Scholars Publishing. ISBN 9781443809900.
- Saitō, Tamaki (2011) Beautiful Fighting Girl. Trans. J. Keith Vincent and Dawn Lawson. Minneapolis: University Of Minnesota Press. ISBN 978-0-8166-5451-2 (with a foreword by Hiroki Azuma)
- Saitō, Tamaki (2012) Social Withdrawal: Adolescence without End. Trans. Jeffrey Angles. Minneapolis: University of Minnesota Press.
