= Tracing (art) =

Act of copying an image or work by drawing over its lines

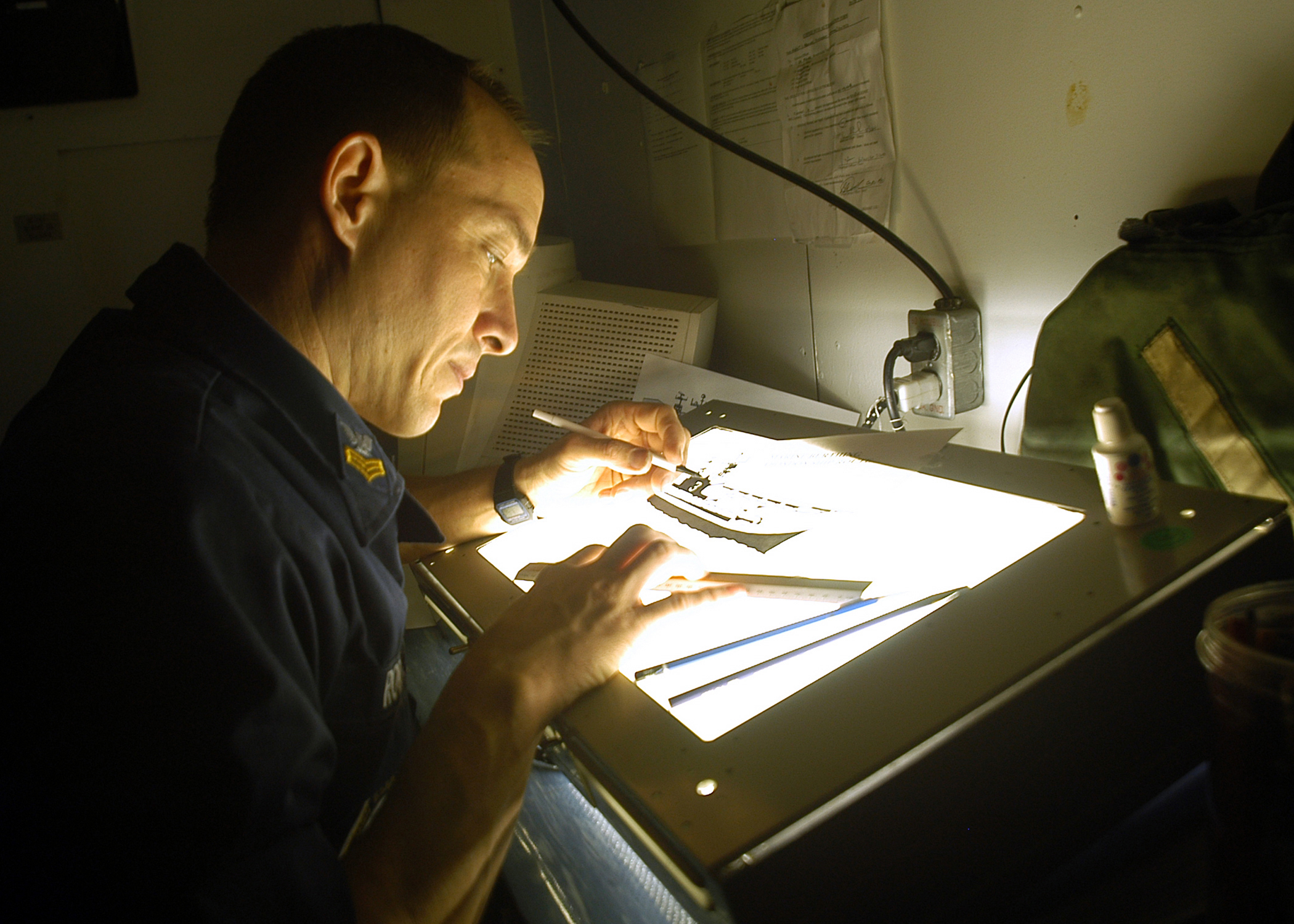
A man using a light table to trace an image.

Tracing is the act of copying an image or work of art by drawing over its lines, especially through the use of transparent overlays.

Tracing can provide a way for a person to develop their artistic skills, especially when it comes to learning anatomy. It is however frowned upon in many art circles.

== See also ==
- Derivative work
