= Michael Jay Moon =

- Born: June 1962 (age 64); United States
- Citizenship: American
- Occupations: Author, entrepreneur, marketing strategist
- Years active: 1978–present
- Known for: Marketing publications and co-founder and CEO of GISTICS Inc.
- Notable work: Co-author of Firebrands: Building Brand Loyalty in the Internet Age
- Website: michaeljaymoon.com

Michael Jay Moon is an American author, entrepreneur, marketing strategist who is the co-author of Firebrands: Building Brand Loyalty in the Internet Age, as well as the co-founder and CEO of the consulting and research company GISTICS Inc.

== Career ==
Moon began his career in Silicon Valley at the microcomputer company IMS Associates, Inc. in 1978, working in marketing and business development roles. He went on to work with Regis McKenna at Regis McKenna, Inc., working on the advertising accounts of Apple, Intel, and Microfocus. He founded his first marketing and communications agency, Michael Moon Associates, in 1981.

After working at various Silicon Valley market research firms, Moon co-founded the Oakland-based GISTICS Inc. in 1987 as a research firm exploring the deployment of new technology, and serves as its president and CEO.

Since 1991 it has focused almost exclusively on digital media and marketing automation. GISTICS researches emerging technologies and provides recommendations for companies to apply them to business and marketing applications. GISTICS also explores emerging trends in social media, and how technology companies can apply them as part of their market entry strategy.

=== Writing ===
Moon was a contributing editor for Morph's Outpost from 1993 to 1995, launching the magazine and writing a monthly column. A technical publication on emerging multimedia design technology, it was based on the design of '60s underground newspapers. He was a blogger for Customer Engagement Agencies, DAM for Marketing and Engagement Marketspace. In 2000, he co-authored Firebrands: Building Brand Loyalty in the Internet Age with Doug Millison. The book is now available in 13 languages.

== Bibliography ==
- Firebrands: Building Brand Loyalty in the Internet Age, McGraw-Hill Osborne Media, 2000

== Recognition ==
In January 1999, Chief Executive Magazine featured Moon in the magazine's "Technology Gurus" article. He also serves on the advisory board of The Vasconcellos Project, a group created to carry the vision of former Silicon Valley legislator John Vasconcellos.
