= The Flaming Forest (novel) =

1921 novel

- Author: James Oliver Curwood
- Language: English
- Genre: Adventure
- Published: 1921
- Publisher: Cosmopolitan Book Corporation
- OCLC: 592260

The Flaming Forest is a 1921 wilderness adventure novel by James Oliver Curwood. Its protagonist, Royal Northwest Mounted Police sergeant David Carrigan, pursues the outlaw Black Roger Audemard through the Canadian wilderness. The book features themes of pursuit, danger, moral conflict, and rugged frontier survival, with a romantic subplot involving Jeanne Marie‑Anne Boulain.

The Flaming Forest was popular in the early 20th century and is an example of the era's mass‑market adventure fiction. The novel is public domain and widely available.

It was adapted to a Metro-Goldwyn-Mayer silent drama feature film of the same name in 1926. It was directed by pioneering director Reginald Barker and stars Antonio Moreno and Renée Adorée.

== Plot summary ==
Sergeant David Carrigan of the Royal Northwest Mounted Police is ambushed while tracking the criminal Black Roger Audemard in the northern Canadian wilderness. Wounded and left for dead, Carrigan is rescued by Jeanne Marie‑Anne Boulain, a mysterious young woman who appears to be connected to the outlaw he is pursuing. As Carrigan recovers, he becomes entangled in a conflict involving frontier justice, hidden loyalties, and the harsh conditions of the northern forests. His pursuit of Audemard leads him through remote settlements, forest fires, and shifting alliances, ultimately forcing him to choose between his duty as a Mountie and his growing feelings for Jeanne.
