= John MacGregor (artist) =

Canadian artist (1944-2019)

John Harry MacGregor
- Born: 1944; Dorking, England
- Died: 2019 (aged 74–75)
- Education: Central Technical School, Toronto
- Spouse: Melanie
- Children: Katie MacGregor
- Awards: Senior Arts Grant, Canada Council (1976)

John Harry MacGregor (1942–2019) was an artist, known for his paintings, prints and sculptures, and as a member of the Isaacs Gallery Group in Toronto.

== Career ==
John Harry MacGregor, was born in England, and came to Canada as a child, in 1948. His family lived in Timmins for two years before moving to Toronto, Ontario. He was trained at Central Technical School in Toronto and held his first solo show in 1967 at Toronto's Hart House Gallery (today, Justina M. Barnicke Gallery, part of the Art Museum, University of Toronto). Critics focused on his use in his early work of familiar objects to draw sexual analogies that were considered fascinating but humorous. He had subsequent shows at the Isaacs Gallery, to which he was introduced by Gordon Rayner and Graham Coughtry, featuring sculptured wood fantasies such as an arching door. In 1993, he said about his work: "I do uncommon things with mundane objects to tantalize, amuse and finally communicate".

By the mid-1970s, he had turned to abstraction believing it gave him the freedom to think and act differently. Critics often praised his colour-saturated abstract work, calling it a "delight". One of them even described the canvases as having a "Matissian flatness". MacGregor varied abstraction with returns in paint to his vocabulary of domestic objects. In 1993, he began to make large-scale sculpture of molded paper pulp and plywood as well as paintings and drawings, using the theme of time.

MacGregor had numerous solo and group exhibitions. In 1983, John MacGregor, A Survey, was organized by the Art Gallery of Greater Victoria, Victoria, British Columbia, and traveled to York University, Toronto; Confederation Centre Art Gallery, Charlottetown, New Brunswick and Concordia University Art Gallery, Montreal. In 1993, Joan Murray organized a show titled John MacGregor: Painter as Time Traveller for the Robert McLaughlin Gallery, Oshawa. In 1994, a show was organized by the Art Gallery of Peel, Brampton, and in 1999 by Gallery Lambton, Sarnia (today the Judith & Norman Alix Art Gallery).

MacGregor's work is in many public gallery collections such as the National Gallery of Canada, Art Gallery of Ontario, Museum London, Ontario; the Winnipeg Art Gallery; the Vancouver Art Gallery, and the Robert McLaughlin Gallery, Oshawa. In 1996, he created a sculpture for the former Rodman Hall Arts Centre, St. Catharines, Ontario. From 1968 to 1987, he was represented by the Isaacs Gallery and from 1998, by the Christopher Cutts Gallery, both in Toronto.

In 1970, MacGregor and Gordon Rayner had a film titled Man at the Centre made about their efforts to survive. At different times, he taught at the New School of Art in Toronto; York University, Toronto; the Ontario College of Art, Toronto; and the University of Toronto.
