= Northwestern Journal of Technology and Intellectual Property =

- Discipline: Intellectual property and technology law
- Language: English
- Edited by: Elisabeth Bruckner

Publication details
- History: 2002-present
- Publisher: Northwestern University School of Law (United States)
- Frequency: Triannually

Standard abbreviations
- Bluebook: Nw. J. Tech. & Intell. Prop.
- ISO 4: Northwest. J. Technol. Intellect. Prop.

Indexing
- ISSN: 1549-8271
- LCCN: 2004213081
- OCLC no.: 54901934

Links
- Journal homepage; Current Issue; Online archive

The Northwestern Journal of Technology and Intellectual Property is a law review published by an independent student organization at Northwestern University School of Law.

== Overview ==
The Northwestern Journal of Technology and Intellectual Property covers academic, business, and legal issues concerning intellectual property and technology law. It publishes articles on a variety of topics including: copyright, trademark, patents, the Internet, media, telecommunications, health care, antitrust, e‑discovery, and trial and litigation technology.

The Northwestern Journal of Technology and Intellectual Property publishes three full issues each year.

== Symposia ==
Every Spring, the journal hosts a symposium on emerging areas of technology and intellectual property law. Symposia have included: "New Rules for a New Day: Examining Recent Trends in IP Law" (2010) and "Riding the Wave: Understanding Recent Developments in IP Law" (2009).

== Notable articles ==
- Shang, Roger (2009). "Inter Partes Reexamination and Improving Patent Quality". Northwestern Journal of Technology and Intellectual Property. 7 (2): 185–203.
- Kappos, David J.; John R. Thomas; Randall J. Bluestone (2008). "A Technological Contribution Requirement for Patentable Subject Matter: Supreme Court Precedent and Policy". Northwestern Journal of Technology and Intellectual Property. 6 (2): 152–170.
