= Michael Moon (professor) =

American literary academic

Academic background
- Education: Columbia University (BA); Johns Hopkins University (PhD)

Academic work
- Discipline: American Literature
- Institutions: Duke University; Johns Hopkins University; Emory University

Michael Moon is an American literary academic. He received his B.A. from Columbia University and Ph.D. in 1989 from Johns Hopkins University for the thesis Whitman in revision: the politics of corporeality and textuality in the first four editions of Leaves of grass He has been a professor in the English department at Johns Hopkins University, in Baltimore, United States. He currently works in Women's, Gender and Sexuality Studies at Emory University. He previously taught at Duke University. His primary research focuses on late-nineteenth- and early-twentieth-century American literature and culture, including film, especially in relation to the history and theory of sexuality and mass culture. He regularly teaches across a broad historical and theoretical range; graduate seminars in recent years have included "Nature and its Others", "Serial Practices, Serial Forms", and "Contesting the Culture Concept: Pragmatism, Ethnography, Early Film."

Eve Kosofsky Sedgwick mentions him in her memoir, A Dialogue on Love (2000), where she names him as a close friend and current living companion. He is the editor of the Norton Critical Edition of Leaves of Grass and several essay-collections in the fields of Queer Theory and American Studies.

== Publications ==
=== Books ===
- A Small Boy and Others: Imitation and Initiation in American Culture from Henry James to Andy Warhol (1998)
- Disseminating Whitman (Harvard University Press, 1991)
- Darger's Resources (Duke University Press, 2012)
- Pasolini's Arabian Nights (Arsenal Pulp Press, 2016)
