= List of Dragon Half characters =

The list of characters from the manga, Dragon Half. Dragon Half has a colorful cast with several of the characters named after famous RPG game mascots. However, only the main cast are shown in the anime adaption.

== Characters ==
From left to right: Pia, Lufa, Mappy, and Mink (the main character)

Mink (ミンク, Minku)
Voiced by: Kotono Mitsuishi (Japanese); Jessica Calvello (English)
Daughter of Ruth, a dragonslayer, and Mana, a dragon, and the star of Dragon Half. She is like a typical teenager except for the fact that she is half-dragon. She has dragon-red hair and eyes as well as horns and a tail, can fly with dragon-wings that appear when needed, can breathe fire, and is overall very strong and resistant to most forms of damage, including poisons. She also seems to be jinxed, bringing all sorts of misfortunes to herself and anyone around her and also inadvertently making herself a lot of enemies. In the manga, her main enemies are King Siva, Princess Vena, and Azatodeth. Mink is also infatuated with Dick Saucer, the handsome dragonslayer and popstar. However, because of her half-human/half-dragon heritage, she is actively seeking out the legendary "People Potion" (ピド・ポーション, Pido-Pōshon), which would make her fully human.
As a part-dragon, she undergoes ecdysis, in which she sheds her skin and becomes more powerful. Her power continuously grows each day after her first ecdysis. She also experiences wild mood and personality swings around the time her ecdysis is supposed to occur. While the first ecdysis just made her stronger with minimal physical alterations (six horns instead of two), the second ecdysis would supposedly turn her irrevocably into a giant disfigured monster of terrifying strength.
According to a prophecy, one who shed their skin twice would gain power surpassing that of the demon gods (including Azatodeth) but would turn into a large black monster with ten legs and four eyes. This is prevented by an arm bracelet gotten from Mink's great-grandfather. The bracelet monitors and suppresses Mink's power. When it's turned off, the counter on the bracelet rises, showing Mink's rise in strength. If the counter ever reaches 999, the second ecdysis would occur. However, when the Demon Lord was released from the Gourd of Saints by one of his minions soon after he was sealed, he overpowered everyone until Mink turned off her bracelet, allowing the counter to reach 999. The foretold ten-armed, four-eyed monster did indeed appear, but it was in the form of a mark on Mink's backside. With her new power, she easily killed Azatodeth with the holy sword her mother made to combat the Demon Lord.
Notably, in order to eat during the quest, anything that is slain by her or the group, except Damaramu, is cooked and eaten shortly after the battle ends.
At the end of the manga, she and Dick have a daughter named "Pink" (ピンク, Pinku) together.
Lufa (ルファ, Rufa)
Voiced by: Mariko Kouda (Japanese); Jennifer K. Earhart (English)
Mink's best friend. Being a physically weak elf, she relies on using (equally weak) magic. Her magical ineptitude also extends to the use of the Lightning Staff; she usually hits everything but the target.
Lufa has an extremely sadistic personality and is quite amoral and untactful, often making fun of the misfortune of others and receiving pleasure from causing it (in the OAV these traits are non-existent). Lufa has also a high sex drive, making advances onto nearly every visually attractive person she comes across, including Mink and other females. She becomes a human at the end of the manga, having been turned into a toad by Azatodeth and then drinking the "People Potion".
The original romaji of her name was "Rufa" but this was not revealed until much later in the manga, so the spelling "Lufa" was used. In the manga, she has a father named Link. She never mentions her mother, although later on, Link is seen with a female elf who is either Lufa's mother or a girlfriend.
Pia (ピア, Pia)
Voiced by: Taeko Kawata (Japanese); Hillary Haag (English)
A human girl (who can be mistaken for a dwarf due to her short and stocky body) who is friends with Mink and Lufa, as well as a small fairy-mouse named Mappy. She constantly wears body armor, even forgetting to take it off before swimming, due to her overly-protective parents.
Mappy (マツピー, Mappī)
Voiced by: Takumi Yamazaki
Pia's pet fairy-mouse (フェアリーマウス, fearī-maus). Mappy acts as Pia's bodyguard whilst traveling, able to transform to the size of a grizzly bear at will. This tends to deter Lufa from whacking Pia when she gets on her nerves, as Mappy often whacks Lufa straight back. He also reflects his mistress' moods; in the anime episode two he becomes dreamy-eyed just like the girls when Dick Saucer happens to come upon them, while as a mouse he shouldn't have any interest in him.
In the anime Mappy is present from the beginning, whereas the manga has him enter at the end of Volume 1. The name "Mappy" is a reference to the video game of the same name.
Dick Saucer (ディック・ソーサー, Dikku Sōsā)
Voiced by: Yasunori Matsumoto (Japanese); Aaron Krohn (English)
Dick Saucer is a famous adventurer, having replaced Ruth as King Siva's official dragonslayer, as well as a pop idol. He is the epitome of a pretty-boy, walking around singing his own theme song, and is admired by many girls, especially Mink, Lufa, and Princess Vena. However, because King Siva tricked Saucer into thinking that Mink is a red dragon in disguise, he tries to kill her, much to Mink's disconcertion.
In the manga, the reason he slays dragons is because his parents were killed by a dragon fifteen years ago. Also he was born into royalty with his parents being the Sea King and Mermaid Queen. In the end, he learns the truth about his parents' murder and is about to marry Mink when Lufa interrupts with news about a new Demon Lord. But either way, this reveals that he now has a love interest in Mink.
At the end of the manga, he and Mink have a daughter named Pink together.
Vena (ビーナ, Bīna)
Voiced by: Rei Sakuma (Japanese); Amanda Winn-Lee (English)
The slime-half daughter of King Siva (human) and Venus (a transformed slime), her mother's true nature was exposed when Vena was born a slime herself, the shock causing her father losing the last hair on his head and her mother to die of heartbreak. It was only by constantly studying black magic since birth that she was able to finally able to achieve a human form, but this form can be undone if she gets hurt sufficiently.
Her non-human heritage is, however, one of the biggest advantages over Mink that she has in battle due to being a slime despite her magically-effected human appearance, having a slime's oozing-gelatinous nature beneath and therefore no "vital organs" to suffer mortal damage from conventionally lethal physical attack (she was not harmed by Mink accidentally stabbing her through her torso) while being very proficient in magic at the same time.
Vena is Mink's rival for the affections of Dick Saucer. She will stop at nothing to achieve her goals, and goes out her way to make Mink's life miserable. She is also very defensive about her father, who has spoiled her rotten (most likely because her human form resembles her late mother's).
In the manga, Vena has studied magic since early childhood and can summon creatures. She plays an important role, but after an incident involving Mink and her father occurring midway through the manga, her role slowly fades away to nothingness. She has violet hair and eyes (as well as a violet slime-body) with a tiara in the OVA but in the manga, her hair and eyes (and slime-body) are pink (just like her mother) and the tiara doesn't come until chapter 37.
At the end of the manga, she gives up on Dick and becomes Migu's girlfriend.
Damaramu (ダマラム, Damaramu)
Voiced by: Akio Ōtsuka (Japanese); Brett Weaver (English)
The ultimate dumb muscle. He constantly brags about his (next to non-existent) greatness as a fighter, talking of himself in the third person, usually as "The Mighty Damaramu". On the DVD commentary for the anime, voice actor Brett Weaver states that the reason Damaramu talks in the third person is "not out of ego, it's just that he has to say it over and over so that he doesn't forget his own name". He is sent by King Siva to hunt Mink, but due to his considerable lack of intelligence — and Mink's jinx — it is a doomed prospect.
The first time he battled Mink, he ended up with his own laser sword running through his skull. However, during the Brutal Killer Martial Arts Tournament, it was revealed that Damaramu had in fact survived, mostly because of what he refers to as his "compact brain". Because his brain is much smaller than normal, his brain was only slightly scratched by the sword. Also, with a little help from Blacksmith Tony, he was resurrected as a cyborg. But before he and Mink went to battle, he stupidly wasted energy showing off his new abilities and was knocked by Mink into the lava pit below the fighting floor. In the ending credits, we see his next form as a head with little arms and legs. This is shown a lot more in the manga, as he starts to get dumber and works with Dug-Finn.
King Siva (シヴァ王, Shiva-Ō)
Voiced by: Kenichi Ogata (Japanese); Paul Sidello (English)
Also simply known as "The King". His daughter, Princess Vena once described him as "balder than a baboon's ass with a face like a squashed frog". He is probably the least intelligent character of them all, save for Damaramu, and would go out of his way to please his spoiled daughter. He also has a desire to kill Ruth for betraying his duty as the kingdom's dragonslayer, and then to take Mana for himself. His favorite method of punishing insubordinates is a stone block alternately called "Super Crushing Press" or "The King's Anger".
Rosario (ロソリオ, Rosario)
Voiced by: Kaneto Shiozawa (Japanese); Andy McAvin (English)
A priest-like figure, and probably the royal magician, Rosario is King Siva's right-hand man in dealing with Mink. Fortunately for her, he tends to use outdated or even downright silly methods, which (partly due to Mink's jinx) occasionally backfire, such as an attempt to feed Mink a laxative which is consumed by Dick Saucer instead. He fancies himself to be a great and powerful magician, but has absolutely no powers and often resorts to using cheesy special effects (such as the hot water and dry ice fog bit) to impress others.
Roshi (ロッシー, Roshī)
Voiced by: Takeshi Aono (Japanese); Spike Spencer (English)
Damaramu's wyvern/dinosaur/bird-type thing which acts as Damaramu's mount, as it is large enough to carry him. It participates in Damaramu's first battle with Mink and company but is eaten after Damaramu's defeat. It's later resurrected as a cyborg like him.
Ruth (ルース, Rūsu)
Voiced by: Takeshi Aono (Japanese); Rob Mungle (English)
Mink's human father. He was once King Siva's dragonslayer known as "The Red Lightning of Siva" (シヴァの赤い稲妻, Shiva no Akai Inazuma), his nickname coming from his moving at speed in his bright-red armor, which allowed him to look like red lightning when fighting. Originally, King Siva had sent Ruth to slay the imperial red dragon (Mana) who had invaded the land but, instead, he fell in love with her at first sight and married her, running away with her to live in obscurity.
Ruth retired from the dragonslaying business, the couple living in a quiet valley where they raised their daughter, Mink. However, the human-dragon couple have long-since devolved into constant domestic strife as the unemployed adventurer has exposed himself to have also been a skirt-chasing layabout; Lufa misremembers his fame as "The Redlight Plaything of Siva" ((シヴァの団地妻, Shiva no Danchizuma). He disapproves of Mink's crush on Dick Saucer, mostly because of his ego as a fabled swordsman.
Although he is excessively perverted and lazy, he will jump in to save his wife and daughter if they are in immediate danger. His special attack (the "Ruth Crush") carves the letter "R" into his opponents. Although retired, he is still a great swordsman, once defeating a large group of monsters attacking Mana and Mink in the woods. When asked about it, he denies having done anything, to which Mana says that he is a good liar. He also still lives up to his nickname, being able to move faster than even Saucer when attacking a monster that had taken Mana hostage.
Mana (マナ, Mana)
Voiced by: Kikuko Inoue (Japanese); Marcy Rae (English)
Mink's mother. As an imperial red dragon (カイザードラゴン(皇赤龍), Kaizā-Doragon (Ōsekiryū); "Kaiser-Dragon (Emperor-Red-Dragon)"), Mana has the ability to change into human form (in the manga, she turns back into a dragon when she is angry). As a result, she can change her form into a beautiful blonde woman; the only evidence that she is a dragon are her small fin-like projections behind her ears. She also puts Ruth in his place whenever he freaks out or acts like a pervert.
Mana created the holy sword "Azatodeth-Buster" to combat the Demon Lord. It has the ability to make anyone thinking evil/perverted thoughts feel sick just by being in its presence.
Venus (ビーナス, Bīnasu)
Voiced by: Noriko Asano (Japanese); Kelly Manison (English)
A slime who had fallen in love with King Shiva, ironically because he was (according to their daughter) "balder than a baboon's ass with a face like a squashed frog". In order to win his affection, she swallowed the legendary "People Potion" to change herself into a beautiful human female. Naturally, the King fell in love with Venus and the two married. She gave birth to his daughter, Vena, but died of a broken heart that she was born a slime (an incident which happened before the beginning of the story in the manga and the anime series).
Dug Finn (ダグ・フィン, Dagu Fin)
Voiced by: Megumi Urawa (Japanese); Tiffany Grant (English)
Master demon and the youngest of three sons of Azatodeth the Warlock (his elder brothers are Migu and Ruth). In the manga, his father is the series' main villain. Very skilled in magic, but is still a kid at heart and easily distracted by candy offerings. He's often bullied by Migu, who takes out his frustration and anger on him.
Azatodeth (アザトデス, Azatodesu)
The main antagonist of the series who is a gigantic three-eyed monster that orders his troops of monsters and kills people. He lives on a bizarre island known as the "Demon King's island". 2,000 years ago, he destroyed various cities. Mink's maternal great-grandfather Joseph and his minions tried to stop him but the minions got beaten up. Luckily, Joseph had "The Gourd of the Saints" - an item which took 200 years for him to make and could capture Azatodeth in there. The bad news was he had forgotten to wear his false teeth so he could not recite the spell properly. As a result, Joseph was nearly killed and the Gourd got broken, but the pieces had magic power left and they lived as three artifacts needed to reconstruct it.
He tries sacrificing his own sons to kill Mink by trapping them all in a room and filling it with lava. Fortunately, they are saved by Rogue, who had anticipated this event and set up a trap door in the floor beforehand in preparation for it. In the end, Azatodeth is killed by the holy sword wielded by Mink, after she had undergone her second ecdysis.
Although Azatodeth plays an important role in the manga, he does not in the anime, only mentioned and in a background.
Blacksmith Tony
You never see this character, but he is important to the story. He is a blacksmith who is ingenious for making mecha-suits and creatures. He made many of Damaramu's prosthetic bodies.
Gai
An stripy-headed warrior who participates in the Brutal Killer Martial arts tournament.

=== Manga-only characters ===
Link (リンク, Rinku)
Lufa's father. An elf wizard, but probably just as bad at magic as his daughter. He and Zelda along with Pia's parents are named after the famous Nintendo characters created by Shigeru Miyamoto which Ryūsuke Mita looks up to.
Zelda (ゼルダ, Zeruda)
Lufa's mother. An elf who does not use magic like her husband or daughter. She completely dotes upon her husband, a fact that Rouce can't understand at all.
Mario (マリオ, Mario)
Pia's father (who can be mistaken for a Dwarf due to his short and stocky body) who faints when he hears bad news or jokes. In later volumes, he seems to faint all the time.
Peach (ピーチ, Pīchi)
Pia's mother. She has a tendency to faint as well. Ruth once openly wondered, in front of his wife, why she married the "chubby dwarf" and thought it was because Mario was secretly rich.
Migu (ミグ, Migu)
The middle son of Azetodeth. Migu has a teddy bear called "Kuma-san" and he wears teddy bear underwear. He also has a variety of odd spells and a magic robot that his father gave him when he was a child. Later, in chapter 39, he is summoned by Princess Vena while he is putting his teddy bear to bed and dressed in only his underwear; Vena takes a picture of this scene and blackmails him into serving her or she will reveal the photo to the whole world. Outraged, Migu destroys the photo in chapter 42 but it is revealed that Vena made many copies of it.
Appearing midway throughout the series, Migu dislikes Mink and Mink dislikes him back. Fortunately, they forgive each other towards the end of the season.
At the end of the manga, he becomes Princess Vena's boyfriend.
Rogue (ログ, Rogu)
Dug Finn and Migu's sensitive elder brother. Rogue claims he hates seeing people suffer and later is seen as someone who hates violence. Although he says this, he seems happy to fight Mink and often takes Migu into a special room for "chastisement". He has two pets known as "The God of Fire" and "The God of Thunder". He also has a talent for making robots, but one of them, a giant cleaner robot, went amok and destroyed one third of his castle. He is shown making three robots later; "Navel 08", "Dark Cherry", and "Apple". In the end, he joins forces with Mink against Azatodeth when the latter betrays him and his brothers.
Navel 08
A Gynoid whose attacks don't resemble their names at all; for example, her "Missile Punch" causes her head to fly off. She was created by Rogue and looks up to him. Her name refers to Cara cara navel oranges because she appears with orange hair on the back cover of Volume 6. Her body is stolen by Damaramu during the battle on Azatodeth's island.
Dark Cherry
Another Gynoid with long, dark hair and a sweet personality, hence her name. Like the other robots created by Rogue, she is fairly useless.
Apple
A small robot whose body is modeled after an army tank especially one from World War II. She was created by Rogue, and bears an uncanny resemblance to My from the Moomin series which is popular in Japan. She can come up with perfect strategies for defeating opponents. Although her strategies have a 99.8% of success, she has no ability to carry them out, seemingly unable to even tell others what her plan is. She is broken when Migu accidentally punches her out of frustration for her uselessness.
Meatball creatures
Meatballs with smiley faces and noodles as arms. A large group of them meet Mana and Mink in the woods one day and politely ask them for a bite of their hearts. When they are refused, they all attack the two of them. All of them are defeated by Ruth and his special attack, which carved the letter "R" into them.
Starman (スターマン, Sutāman)
An old man with a star on his forehead. He is the leader of Pido and the one that encourages Mink to slay down Azatodeth because three years ago he ruined Pido, taking away all the wealth for himself. Shortly after that, Pido became a market selling Manjū.
Granny Ladora
A fortune-teller that was the lover of Starman when she was fifteen years old. She tells the group about where the three artifacts are.
Suzuki
Azatodeth's beautiful private receptionist. She appears only once in the manga. She fights Mink because she was promised a special bonus and a three-week paid-leave vacation if she defeated her.
Sonic (ソニック, Sonikku)
Dick Saucer's cousin. He was named after Sonic the Hedgehog. Like his namesake, he can run very fast. A running gag is that Sonic is girl-crazy and will take pictures of Dick Saucer in order to get dates. Twice, he disguises as him with a wig.
Anna (アンナ, Anna)
A mermaid, Sonic's mother and the aunt of Dick Saucer. Anna is extremely attractive.
Rosa and Lydia
Two very beautiful mermaid sisters who protect their beach from intruders. Their beach leads to the Sea Kingdom. Named after the female characters Rosa and Rydia from Final Fantasy IV.
Petit Cathy (Kathleen)
Big, horned, ugly female demon that has recently been hired by Azatodeth. She goes into multiple fits of rage when someone calls her actual name "Kathleen" or forget to call her "Petit".
Paul
Long ago, he was a brave young warrior. Now he is an old man who likes to brag and tell exaggerated stories. He is initially seen serving Petit Cathy. After meeting Mink, Lufa, Pia, and Mappy, he regains his fighting spirit and protects a group of people from being taken hostage by Cathy.
Vulconte
A Golden eagle unable to fly. He is one of Azatodeth's minions, but Vulconte is really weak and afraid of heights. Vulconte claims to have beaten Migu three times in a row, but only in a kids game.
Azadeth
A triclops initially mistaken for Azatodeth and believed to be his son during the 28th Malice championship - until Dug Finn cuts him in two.
Titan (タイタン, Taitan)
Mink's maternal grandfather, who is for a long time believed to have been the red dragon that killed Dick Saucer's parents, but very late in the manga it turns out he did not. In actuality, he was captured and cloned by Azatodeth years ago to create a rift between Neptune's and Kaiser's dragons. The clone was imprinted with the Demon Lord's personality and was the true murderer of Dick Saucer's parents. The clone is eventually killed by Ruth and Saucer.
The God of Fire
A 12-feet tall Leopard-spotted creature with shark fins for ears. It can gout black clouds of smoke from its nostrils.
The God of Thunder
A creature that looks like the God of Fire, only a foot shorter.
The Temple Girl Twins (a.k.a. the Temple Women)
Twin sisters who wear turbans and take care of King Siva's castle. They also serve as Princess Vena's servants.
Gaya
A red dragon that appears later in the manga. He met Mana many years ago and he wanted to marry her, but she married Ruth months later. When Gaya meets Mink and she tells him Mana is her mother, he gets so outraged for the fact Mana married a male human he attacks her several times until Saucer kills him with his signature attack, the "Saucer Special", while mistaking him for Mink.
Later on, he is resurrected by a vampire. However, Mink destroys him completely.
Laura
After Gaya is killed, Pia finds Saucer's pendant on the ground. Mink disguises herself as a human called Laura before attending a special party for Saucer, then she returns the pendant to him. Vena discovers her tail coming out of Laura's dress and Mink is exposed. Vena freezes all the guests before a statue is thrown by Mink. Laura is never seen again except in flashbacks.
Siren (セイレーン, Seirēn)
A green-haired mermaid in love with an orange-haired man called Adol. When they are introduced, Siren is kidnapped by a red octopus called "Tako" until it is apparently cooked by Mink and Siren is rescued.
Adol (アドル, Adoru)
Siren's crush. When Siren is kidnapped, he gets worrisome and cowardly until he gets Siren back. Adol is named for the main protagonist of Ys.
Broud
A medium-sized talking plant that looks like a cross between a rose and a Cooktown orchid with eyes and vines who eventually gets squashed by Vena by accident. Later, he comes to back to life as a gigantic 6-feet tall flower calling himself "Great Broud". He has the ability to squash ladybugs with one of his vines.
Dancing King Heartenberg
A king that lives in a castle in the sky and prefers to be called "Honey". Honey had a nasty argument with his wife, Sarah, after she served his least favorite food, a carrot, fifteen years earlier. The argument became a war which lasted 100 days; Sarah fled to the castle's underground chamber to end the fight. Honey was upset and decided to overcome his hate of carrots (which he accomplished in three years). As for Sarah, she was kidnapped by a knight calling himself the "Armored Lord". When Mink hears about this, she rescues Sarah from the Armored Lord, only to find out the Armored lord is really a mass of armor controlled by a midget and Sarah is the armored lord's wife despite being married to Honey which she still loves. When Sarah returned from the underground chamber, he accepts her and the daughter she had with the Armored Lord. The three of them are last seen dancing happily together as a family.
Sarah
Honey's wife. She likes carrots. She was hypnotized by the Armored Lord and had a daughter with him. Her daughter has a horn on her head and is small enough to stand on the palm of Honey's hand.
Simon del Monte (シモン・デルモンテ, Shimon deru Monte)
A young king whose problem is that his land is covered with zombies. In his castle, there is a special sword that can get rid of the zombies and Deirdré Dead Lai, a vampire woman that has been responsible for the cause of the zombies (although Simon calls her "High Emperor Dead Lie" and believes she is male until later on). When he finally discovers Deirdré Dead Lai is female, he falls in love and asks her to marry him. Deirdré Dead Lai agrees and brings her four handmaidens along so they can live in the castle.
Simon has a tendency to shower gold coins around.
Ralph
Simon sel Monte's younger brother. He is often crowned prince, but he refuses to inherit the throne. Ralph and Simon are named after two members of the Belmont family from the Castlevania game series.
Deirdré Dead Lai (デッドライ大帝, Deddorai-taitei)
A female vampire. She was Azatodeth's lover until he dumped her. Now she lives all by herself with her four handmaidens who represent the four Classical elements. Dead Lai is a major villain for a couple of volumes and only found out to be female near the end of her story arc.
Earth Mede (アース・メデ, Āsu Mede)
One of Deirdré Dead Lai's four handmaiden-generals. She is 26 years old. Associated with Earth. She was the first of the Generals to meet Mink and cared a lot about her looks. When Mink was fighting her and ripped her clothes, she felt Mink was trying to say how much better her body was.
Melami Flare (メラミ・フレア, Merami Ferea)
Another one of Deirdré Dead Lai's handmaiden-generals. Associated with Fire. Has a pet lizard which turns into a giant monster when it sees anything sexy or perverted.
Bufu Aeroga (ブフ・エアロガ, Bufu Earoga)
A fat, overweight brunette with braids and is one of Deirdré Dead Lai's handmaiden-generals. Associated with Air. Bufu has no expression change on her face and only talks with her name. Jasmine however can understand her and know what expression she is "meant" to be showing. Despite having a large protective layer of fat, she is knocked out in one hit by Mink. Bufu is in fact shown in the anime version. When talking about the Brutal Killer Martial Arts Tournament, a number of people and monsters are shown. To the right of the screen is Bufu. This is also seen in the Ending Credits.
Beautiful Jasmine (プティフール・ジーサンズ, Putifūru Jīsanzu)
An adorable airhead with cat ears and a pink heart on her forehead. She is one of Deirdré Dead Lai's handmaiden-generals. Associated with Water. She has unlimited tears, being able to cry enough to submerge a whole city. In the battle against Mink, she was fairly useless as her tears simply flowed back into Dead Lai's cavern. Though she acts all nice and sweet, this masks a somewhat nasty side. One example of this is the start of Chapter 34 where she is lying in an overly "cute"-style bed with her little bird tweeting to wake her up. She comments on this and then tells the bird (while still looking and acting cute) "Shut your rotting hole or else I'll gouge your eyes out!".

== See also ==
- List of Dragon Half chapters
