= Starson v Swayze =

- Supreme Court of Canada

Hearing: January 15, 2003 Judgment: June 6, 2003
- Full case name: Dr Russel Fleming v Professor Starson aka Scott Jeffery Schutzman
- Citations: 2003 SCC 32, [2003] 1 S.C.R. 722
- Ruling: Appeal dismissed

Court membership
- Chief Justice: Beverley McLachlin; Puisne Justices: Charles Gonthier, Frank Iacobucci, John C. Major, Michel Bastarache, Ian Binnie, Louise Arbour, Louis LeBel, Marie Deschamps

Reasons given
- Majority: Major J. (paras. 61 - 120), joined by Iacobucci, Bastarache, Binnie, Arbour and Deschamps JJ.
- Dissent: McLachlin C.J. (paras. 1 - 60), joined by Gonthier and LaBel JJ.

Starson v Swayze, 2003 SCC 32, [2003] 1 S.C.R. 722 was an important case at the Supreme Court of Canada that considered the legal requirements for determining if a person is capable of making decisions regarding their medical treatment.

On December 24, 1998, Dr. Ian Gary Swayze declared Professor Starson (a.k.a. Scott Jeffery Schutzman) incapable of consenting to proposed psychiatric treatment and should therefore be involuntarily medicated as directed. Starson applied to a legal body known as the Consent and Capacity Board for a review of this decision. On June 6, 2003, the Supreme Court of Canada published its decision in the case. In a 6 to 3 decision, the majority held that Starson had the right to refuse medication.

== Background ==
Scott Jeffery Schutzman, who changed his name to Starson and preferred to be called "Professor", obtained an electrical engineering degree and held a strong interest in physics (although it was not his profession). He was diagnosed with bipolar disorder. He appreciated that he was not 'normal' and that he had problems dealing with people. He acknowledged that he had mental health issues, but he refused to accept his condition as an illness. He also refused to consent to the course of medications that his physicians recommended for fear that it would diminish his thinking. He would have accepted psychotherapy but no medication.

Dr. Ian Gary Swayze, who was not Starson's primary doctor but who had reviewed his medical charts, testified first. "[T]his charting is ominous. It would suggest to me a chronic, unremitting course which likely would be a future for Professor Starson, should he not receive treatment," Swayze testified.

On December 24, 1998, Swayze declared Starson incapable of consenting to proposed psychiatric treatment and should therefore be involuntarily medicated as directed.

Starson applied to the Consent and Capacity Board for a review of this decision. The Board decided that, because Starson did not recognize that he was ill and that he needed treatment, Starson was not able to understand the consequences of consent; he failed to appreciate the risks and the benefits and therefore he lacked the capacity to make a decision as to treatment. Starson was subsequently charged multiple times with uttering death threats and has spent most of his later life in institutions.

== Case ==
The issue facing the Supreme Court of Canada was, "Is the Consent and Capacity Board entitled to override Starson’s refusal and order him to undergo treatment?" The holding was, "No."

The Court "ruled that Starson did have the capability and capacity to determine his own treatment."

Justice Major wrote the majority decision, that: According to the Health Care Consent Act a person is able to consent when he understands the information relevant to making the decision, and can appreciate the reasonably foreseeable consequences of the decision. The role of the Board is solely to adjudicate on the issue of capacity and not to determine what is in the best interests of the patient.

Prior to the Starson decision, a person who does not acknowledge illness cannot accept the consequences of treatment. The Court recognized that a person who has accepted the manifestations of illness, although not the final diagnosis, does not forgo capacity to refuse treatment. All the patient must do is be:

1. Able to understand the information about the treatment, and
2. Able to assess the costs and benefits of the treatment.

The patient does not have to weigh the benefits properly or rationally.

The majority also noted that psychiatrists do not always agree on diagnoses. So long as the patient can recognize the symptoms, then the court will have difficulty finding incapacity. In addition, the evidence that was given failed to meet standards of proof, the Consent Board made note over the vague references that Dr. Swayze made to medical charts and past death threats. "The medical charts themselves were not marked as exhibits at the hearing and there is no indication that the members of the board even looked at them," Justice Molloy chastised. "The evidence of a non-treating psychiatrist Dr. Ian Gary Swayze based on a chart review and unsupported by first-hand evidence of anybody is far removed from 'cogent and compelling evidence.' It is contrary to the principles of justice to interfere with important individual rights on the basis of such flimsy evidence."

Major determined that McLachlin was doing what the Board did: deciding what was in the patient’s best interests.

Rationale: Denial of one’s illness is not a sufficient criterion to establish a patient’s incapacity to refuse treatment.

== Critique ==
McLachlin CJ focussed on the patient's delusions, where Major’s majority did not. Both McLachlin and Major agree that the issue is not a “best interests of the patient” standard. She felt, however, that the patient may be able to understand the general nature of the illness but cannot recognize that he has the illness. This means that the patient cannot appreciate the benefits of the treatment or the need for treatment.

== Commentary ==
The majority may have accurately surmised from the following language of the Board: “it viewed with great sadness the current situation of the patient […] his life has been devastated by his mental disorder.”

According to Daphne Jarvis, a legal counsel to the Schizophrenia Society of Canada,

"The [Supreme] Court did not change the Health Care Consent Act or even make the process more difficult."

According to an article in The Ottawa Citizen,

"What the court majority ruled was that Consent and Capacity board in 1999 did not have enough evidence to support its finding that Mr. Starson was incapable of deciding on treatment."

== See also ==
- List of Supreme Court of Canada cases (McLachlin Court)
- Health Care Consent Act (Ontario)
- Mental Health Act (Ontario)
- Substitute Decisions Act
