= Kitada =

Kitada (written: 北田) is a Japanese surname. Notable people with the surname include:

- Akihiro Kitada (born 1971), Japanese sociologist
- Akiko Kitada (born 1982), Japanese former field hockey player
- Kayo Kitada (born 1978), retired Japanese judoka
- Rui Kitada (born 1981), Japanese professional golfer
- Sumiko Kitada (born 1962), Japanese badminton player
