= Kiyokazu =

- Gender: Male

Origin
- Origin: Japanese
- Meaning: Different meanings depending on the kanji used

Kiyokazu (written: 清一, 清種, 清枚, 清和, 潔和, or きよかず in hiragana) is a masculine Japanese given name. Notable people with the name include:

- Kiyokazu Abo (安保 清種; 1870–1948), Imperial Japanese Navy admiral
- Kiyokazu Chiba (千葉 潔和; born 1961), Japanese manga artist
- Kiyokazu Katsumata (勝又 清和; born 1969), Japanese shogi player
- Kiyokazu Kudo (久藤 清一; born 1974), Japanese footballer
- Kiyokazu Naitō (内藤 清枚; 1646–1714), Japanese daimyō
- Kiyokazu Washida (鷲田 清一; born 1949), Japanese philosopher
