= HCCA =

HCCA can stand for:

- (Hybrid Coordination Function) Controlled Channel Access
- α-Cyano-4-hydroxycinnamic acid
- Health Care Consent Act
