= List of Dragon Half chapters =

The list of chapters on Dragon Half, a manga by Ryūsuke Mita. There are 65 chapters spanning over seven volumes in total.

== Volumes list ==
No.	Japanese release date	Japanese ISBN
01	May 1989	4-8291-8304-7
01. "King Siva's Scheme"; 02. "Longing for the knight, Dick Saucer"; 03. "Enter Perfect Princess Vina!"; 04. "The Legend of the Pido potion"; 05. "Mink's journey begins"; 06. "Mink's journey begins"; 07. "Dick Saucer goes after Mink?!?"; 08. "Vina's secret"; 09. "Threat of Archdemon Azetodeth"; 10. "Damaramu's blunder of a lifetime"
02	May 1990	4-8291-8309-8
11. "Kidnapped Siren's songs"; 12. "The search of the three artifacts"; 13. "Certain Kill! The metal golem of Terror!"; 14. "The 28th annual Malice-slay championship"; 15. "Damaramu revived"; 16. "Enter Azetodeth's son Dug!"; 17. "The Final Battle! Mink versus Dug!"; 18. "The Naga spider's trap"; 19. "The treasure of the castle in the sky"; 20. "The 100 days war! Love and its destination!"
03	May 1991	4-8291-8313-6
21. "Mink's worst pinch"; 22. "Audience rating 120%. Saucer's Hidden Past"; 23. "Mink in glass slippers Part 1"; 24. "Mink in glass slippers Part 2"; 25. "Rescue Mink! Pia's feat"; 26. "Heavy Damaramu strikes Back?!?"; 27. "A new enemy, High emperor Dead Lie"; 28. "Dragon Half awakening"; 29. "The secret of the holy cross sword"; 30. "Threat of Earth;one of Dead Lie's troops"
04	May 1992	4-8291-8320-9
31. "Mink VS General Earth"; 32. "Another Mink?!?'"; 33. "Dream Angel Magical Yone"; 34. "Showdown! The undead emperor's labyrinth Part 1"; 35. "Showdown! The undead emperor's Labyrinth Part 2"; 36. "Migu strikes hard!"; 37. "Legend of the holy gourd'"; 38. "Vina strikes back!"; 39. "Dad is a good liar"; 40. "Shudder! Great Demon Lord Azetodeth'"
05	April 1993	4-8291-8331-4
41. "The Demon King strikes!"; 42. "Dragon Half - Tragic destiny?"; 43. "Ultra Mecha-God Damuramudeth Part 1"; 44. "Ultra Mecha-God Damuramudeth Part 2"; 45. "Saucer, prince of the Neptunes!"; 46. "The Neptune castle, full of love and hate"; 47. "The most secret trick, Sword of Dreamy Meteor (Sonic special)"; 48. "Super-destructive Beast-Man Migu-guirras"; 49. "Paul's miracle adventures"; 50. "How do you do? My name is Suzuki!"
06	April 1994	4-8291-8342-X
51. "The beautiful assassin"; 52. "Farewell Mappy"; 53. "The secret of the Demon King's island!?"; 54. "Strike back! Three Machine-Head soldiers"; 55. "His name is Titan"; 56. "Great demon king's royal conference on Air (via satellite)"; 57. "Showdown! The Demon king's castle part 1"; 58. "Showdown! The demon King's castle part 2"; 59. "Booby Trap"; 60. "Clash! Saucer versus Titan!"
07	May 1995	4-8291-8343-8
61. "Saucer burnt out"; 62. "Showdown! Azetodeth!"; 63. "A drop of Pido potion"; 64. "The Final Choice"; 65. "See you again"; Sequel: "Dragon Half Z"
