= Koharu =

- Gender: Female

Origin
- Origin: Japanese
- Meaning: Different meanings depending on the kanji used

Koharu (written: 小春 or コハル in katakana) is a feminine Japanese given name occasionally used for men. Notable people with the name include:

== Women ==
- Koharu Kisaragi (如月 小春) (1956–2000), Japanese playwright, director, and essayist
- Koharu Kusumi (久住 小春; born 1992), Japanese idol, singer, model, actress, voice actress and television personality
- Koharu Sugawara (菅原 小春; born 1992), Japanese choreographer and model
- Koharu Yonemoto (米元 小春; born 1990), Japanese badminton player

== Men ==
- Koharu Sakuraba (桜場 コハル), Japanese manga artist
