= PGT =

PGT may refer to:

- Guatemalan Party of Labour (Partido Guatemalteco del Trabajo) (1949–1998), a Guatemalan political party
- Office of the Public Guardian and Trustee, a government organization in Ontario, Canada
- Pegasus Airlines (founded 1991), a Turkish low-cost carrier with ICAO code PGT
- Pilipinas Got Talent (2010–2018, 2025-present), a Philippine reality TV competition
- PokerGO Tour (founded 2021), an American poker tour
- Preimplantation genetic testing (see Preimplantation genetic diagnosis)
- Puccinia graminis f. sp. tritici, a stem rust of wheat and barley
- Urban-type settlement (posyolok gorodskogo tipa), in the former Soviet Union
- P. G. T. Beauregard, a Confederate States Army general
