= Bodily integrity =

Human right to personal autonomy, self-ownership, and self-determination

Bodily integrity is the inviolability of the physical body and emphasizes the importance of personal autonomy, self-ownership, and self-determination of human beings over their own bodies. In the field of human rights, violation of the bodily integrity of another is regarded as an unethical infringement, intrusive, and possibly criminal.

== Human rights ==
Two key international documents protect these rights: the Universal Declaration of Human Rights and the International Covenant on Civil and Political Rights. Furthermore, the Convention on the Rights of Persons with Disabilities also requires protection of physical and mental integrity.

== Women's rights ==
Though bodily integrity is afforded to every human being, women are more often affected in violations of it, via unwanted pregnancy, and limited access to contraception. These principles were addressed in the 1997 Irish Council for Civil Liberties Working Conference on Women's Rights as Human Rights, which defined bodily integrity as a right deserved by all women: "bodily integrity unifies women and ... no woman can say that it does not apply to them."

As defined by the conference participants, the following are bodily integrity rights that should be guaranteed to women:

- Freedom of movement
- Security of persons
- Reproductive and sexual rights
- Women's health
- Breaking women's isolation
- Education
- Networking

In her book Sextarianism, Maya Mikdashi described the persisting issue of the violation of women's bodily integrity through hymen exams in the Lebanese state.

== Children's rights ==
=== United States ===
The debate over children's rights to bodily integrity has grown in recent years. In the wake of the highly publicized Jerry Sandusky trial, parents have been increasingly encouraged to promote their child's sense of bodily integrity as a method of reducing children's vulnerability to being victims of sexual violence, human trafficking and child prostitution.

Methods of increasing children's sense of bodily autonomy include:

- Allowing children to choose when to give hugs/kisses
- Encouraging children to communicate about boundaries
- Offer alternative actions (e.g. a high five, handshake, etc.)

== Medicine ==
The International Covenant on Civil and Political Rights states the following: "No one shall be subjected to torture or cruel, inhuman or degrading treatment or punishment. In particular, no one shall be subjected without his free consent to medical or scientific experimentation."

== Government and law ==
=== Ireland ===
In the Republic of Ireland, bodily integrity has been recognised by the courts as an unenumerated right, protected by the general guarantee of "personal rights" contained within Article 40 of the Irish constitution. In Ryan v Attorney General it was pronounced that "you have the right not to have your body or personhood interfered with. This means that the State may not do anything to harm your life or health. If you are in custody, you have a right not to have your health endangered while in prison".

In a separate case M (Immigration - Rights of Unborn) -v- Minister for Justice and Equality & ors, the Irish Supreme Court ruled that the right to bodily integrity extended to the unborn. In a summary of the case in section 5.19, the Supreme Court stated:

...the only right of the unborn child as the Constitution now stands which attracts the entitlement to protection and vindication is that enshrined by the amendments in Article 40.3.3 namely, the right to life or, in other words, the right to be born and, possibly, (and this is a matter for future decision) allied rights such as the right to bodily integrity which are inherent in and inseparable from the right to life itself.

=== United States ===
The Fourth Amendment to the United States Constitution states "The right of the people to be secure in their persons, houses, papers, and effects, against unreasonable searches and seizures shall not be violated". Also, the U.S. Supreme Court has upheld the right to privacy, which, as articulated by Julie Lane, often protects rights to bodily integrity. In Griswold v. Connecticut (1965) the Court supported women's rights to obtain birth control (and thus, retain reproductive autonomy) without marital consent. Similarly, a woman's right to privacy in obtaining abortions was protected by Roe v. Wade (1973). In McFall v. Shimp (1978), a Pennsylvania court ruled that a person cannot be forced to donate bone marrow, even if such a donation would save another person's life.

The Supreme Court overturned Roe v. Wade (1973) on June 24, 2022. The Supreme Court has also protected the right of governmental entities to infringe upon bodily integrity under certain circumstances. Examples include laws prohibiting the use of drugs, laws prohibiting euthanasia, laws requiring the use of seatbelts and helmets, strip searches of prisoners, and forced blood tests.

=== Canada ===
In general, the Canadian Charter of Rights and Freedoms defends personal liberty and the right not to be interfered with. However, in certain unique circumstances government may have the right to temporarily override the right to physical integrity in order to preserve the life of the person. Such action can be described using the principle of supported autonomy, a concept that was developed to describe unique situations in mental health (examples include the forced feeding of a person dying from the eating disorder anorexia nervosa, or the temporary treatment of a person living with a psychotic disorder with antipsychotic medication).

One unique example of a Canadian law that promotes bodily integrity is Ontario's Health Care Consent Act. This law has to do with the capacity to consent to medical treatment. The HCCA states that a person has the right to consent to or refuse treatment if they have mental capacity. In order to have capacity, a person must have the ability to understand and appreciate the consequences of the treatment decision. The law says that a person is capable with respect to a treatment, admission to a care facility or a personal assistance service if the person is able to understand and appreciate the information that is relevant to making such a decision.

== See also ==
- Abortion-rights movements
- Anti-vaccine activism
- Body theory
- Body modification
- Circumcision controversies
- Civil liberties
- Cognitive liberty
- Drug liberalization
- Freedom of choice
- Gender self-identification
- Intersex human rights
- Legal recognition of non-binary gender
- Legal status of transgender people
- LGBTQ rights
- McFall v. Shimp
- Mera Jism Meri Marzi
- Morphological freedom
- My body, my choice
- Personal boundaries
- Reproductive rights
- Right to die
- Right to personal identity
- Self-defense
- Sexual and reproductive health and rights
- Tattoo
- Transgender rights
