= Masachi Osawa =

Japanese sociologist and philosopher (born 1958)

- Born: October 15, 1958; Nagano, Japan
- Occupation: Sociologist

Academic background
- Education: University of Tokyo
- Thesis: The Algebra of Actions

Academic work
- Discipline: Sociology
- Sub-discipline: Otaku culture, popular culture
- Notable ideas: Body theory

Masachi Osawa (大澤 真幸, Ōsawa Masachi; born October 15, 1958 in Nagano, Japan) is a Japanese sociologist and philosopher. Outside Japan, he is best known as a social scientist, often mentioned in reference to sociological and philosophical research on otaku culture and popular Japanese animation series such as Ghost in the Shell: Stand Alone Complex.

== Education ==
Osawa received his Ph.D. in sociology from the University of Tokyo in 1990. His Ph.D. thesis is The Algebra of Actions (行為の代数学, Koi no Daisugaku). His supervisor was Munesuke Mita.

== Career and research ==
He is one of the most influential sociologists in Japan and a prolific author. He has taught at Chiba University and Kyoto University.

Osawa is known for proposing a form of body theory that is concerned with how our life-world is constructed, particularly the process that yields norm and meaning. He assumes that the coordination between more than two bodies, which includes physical objects, sustains all human activities. Such coordination, which Osawa called as "inter-bodily chain" is the basis of our experiences. In his view, the interaction of the bodies produces the transcendental agency that defines what is valid and invalid or appropriate and inappropriate.

The sociologist also labeled the period starting from 1995 onwards as the Age of Impossibility in contrast the Age of Virtuality (1970-1995). The former described a decline of totality in contemporary society while the latter, which was equated with virtuality, was an era when reality was relativized.

Osawa has contributed to the most influential Japanese postmodern journal Critical Space (批評空間, Hihyōkūkan), edited by Kojin Karatani and Akira Asada. He has also written essays for the Japanese arts and technology journal called InterCommunication.

== See also ==
- Munesuke Mita
- Kojin Karatani
- Shinji Miyadai
- Hiroki Azuma
