= McFall v. Shimp =

U.S. court case regarding forced organ donation

McFall v. Shimp, 10 Pa. D. & C. 3d 90 (July 26, 1978), was an Allegheny County, Pennsylvania, court case. The court ruled that it is unacceptable to force another person to donate body parts, even in a situation of medical necessity.

== Summary ==
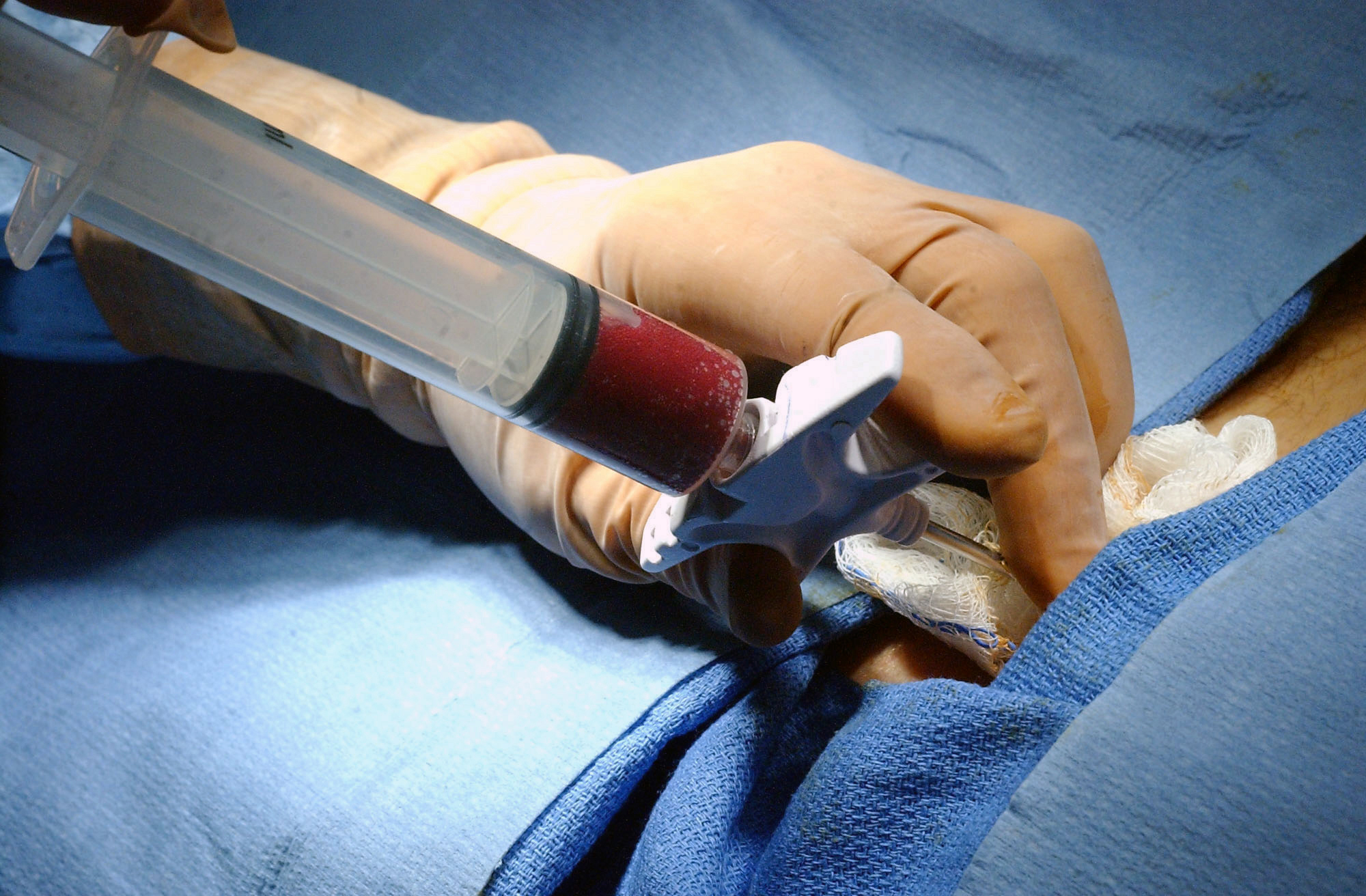
A direct bone marrow harvest in progress

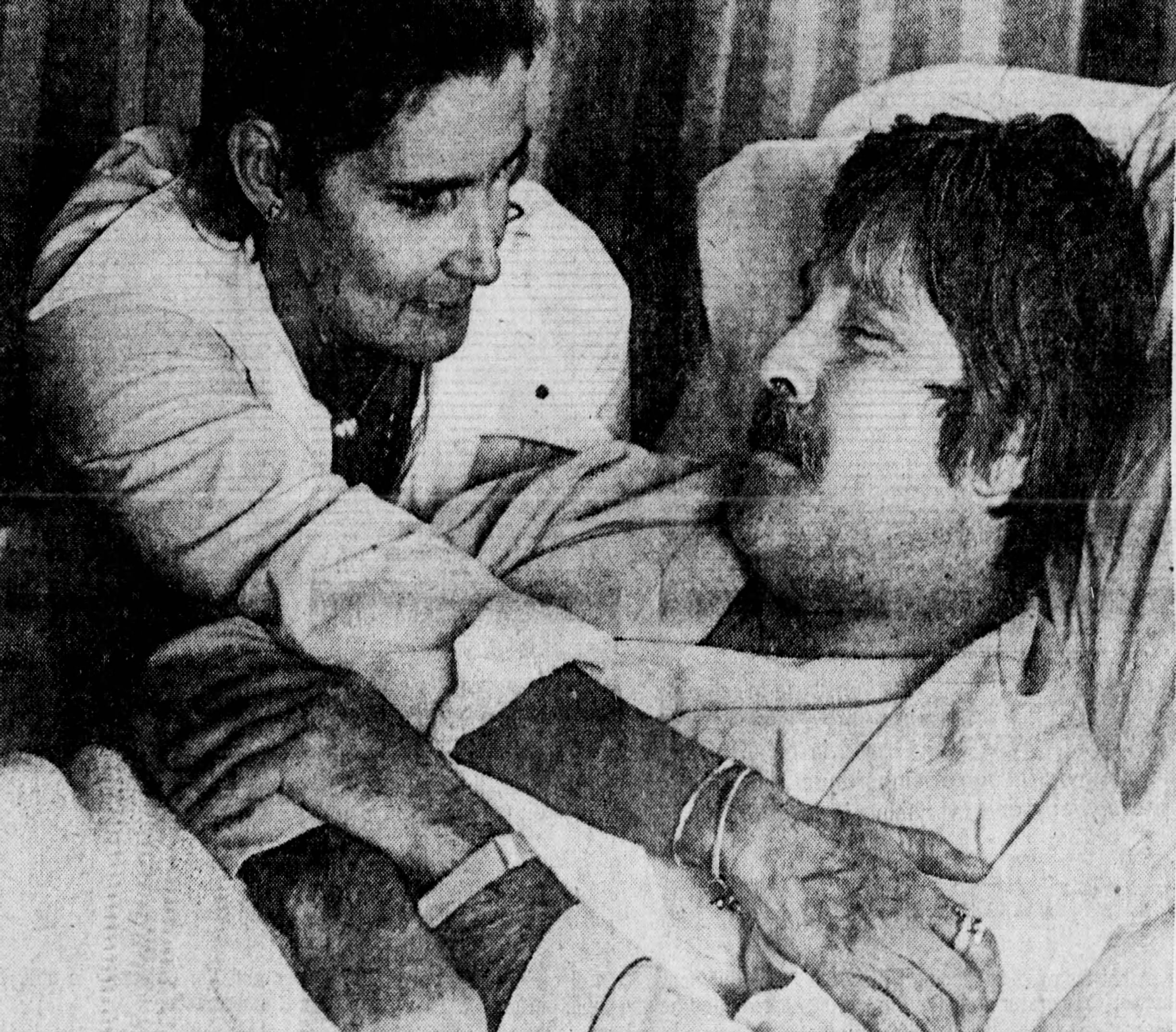
McFall (right) with his sister in 1978

Thirty-nine-year-old unmarried asbestos worker Robert McFall had "a rare bone marrow disease" called aplastic anemia, where the patient's bone marrow fails to manufacture certain necessary blood components. Without an urgent bone marrow transfusion, McFall would soon die. McFall's first cousin, a 42-year-old crane worker named David Shimp, was the only available bone marrow match for McFall at the time, but Shimp refused to donate his bone marrow, which would have dramatically increased the odds of saving McFall's life (with Shimp's bone marrow donation, doctors estimated that McFall would have had a 50% to 60% chance of surviving). McFall then sued Shimp in order to force him to donate his bone marrow. When the case ended up in court, Judge John P. Flaherty Jr. stated that Shimp's position was "morally indefensible", but simultaneously refused to force Shimp to donate his bone marrow. Judge Flaherty also stated that forcing a person to submit to an intrusion of his body in order to donate bone marrow "would defeat the sanctity of the individual and would impose a rule which would know no limits, and one could not imagine where the line would be drawn." McFall attempted to cite a 700-year-old statute of Edward I, pointing out that the court was a successor to the Court of Chancery, although the statute was not found to have any authority after a diligent search.

== Aftermath ==
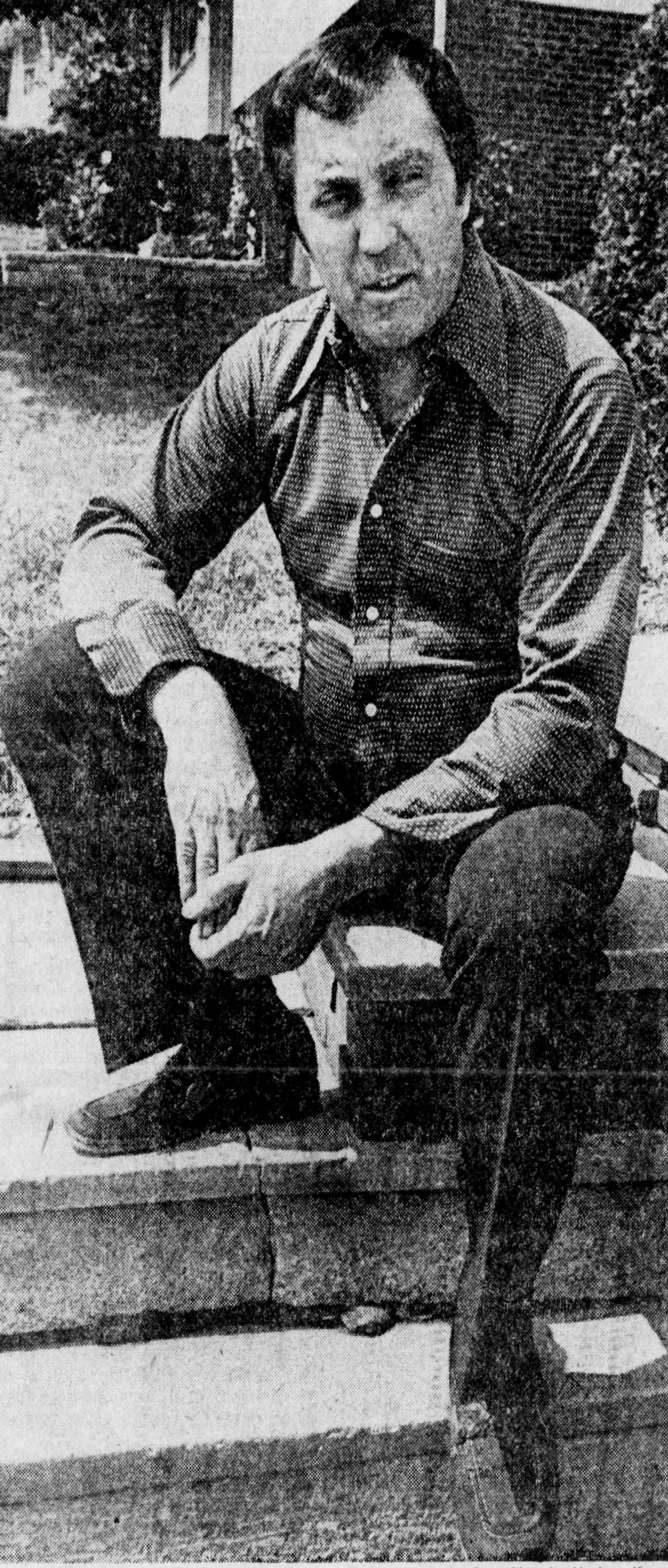
Shimp in 1978

Robert McFall died of a massive hemorrhage on August 10, 1978, about half a month after this court case was decided against him. Robert McFall's sister, Beverly Hope, stated that McFall forgave Shimp near the very end of his life and asked his family to forgive Shimp for refusing to donate his bone marrow as well. David Shimp generally refused to talk with reporters, but he did say that his decision not to donate bone marrow was "common sense" in an interview with the Pittsburgh Press.

In addition to being cited in analyses of tissue donation from a legal point of view, its ruling on the compelled use of the body of a non-consenting person to benefit another person has also been cited in legal analysis of the abortion debate and of women's rights during pregnancy. Philosopher David Boonin has used the case in his defense of abortion rights, even if it is granted that the fetus is a person entitled to a right to life.
