= Yasuo Yuasa =

Japanese philosopher

- Born: 5 June 1925
- Died: 2005 (aged 79–80)

Philosophical work
- Era: 20th-century philosophy
- Region: Japanese philosophy
- School: Kyoto School
- Main interests: Mind-body problem

Yasuo Yuasa (湯浅 泰雄, Yuasa Yasuo; 1925–2005) was a Japanese philosopher of religion. Yuasa is known for his works on the theory of the body in Western and Asian philosophy and for his teaching. He has been referred to as "one of the most provocative and far-reaching" among Japan's contemporary philosophers.

== Early life and education ==
Yasuo Yuasa studied ethics under Watsuji Tetsuro at Tokyo University. He later also studied yoga with Motoyama Hiroshi, and these studies influenced his philosophical views.

== Career ==
In his early years Yuasa took up a position as assistant in the Ethics Department at the University of Tokyo. His places of employment include Yamanashi University, Osaka University, the University of Tsukuba and Obirin University.

== Work ==
Much of his work, particularly since the end of the 1970s, has focused on theories of the body in Asian and Western philosophy, in religion and in medicine. He had particular interest in the mind-body problem, also developing his own model of mind-body function.

The basis of Yuasa's work lies in both Eastern and Western traditions. He studied the works of Kitaro Nishida, of his teacher Tetsuro Watsuji, of Kiyoshi Miki and of Hajime Tanabe; he also took into consideration Eastern meditation practices such as zen meditation and yoga, the Eastern notion of the meridians of the body, as well as Western depth psychology, in particular the Jungian approach.

Yuasa looks at Descartes' dualism, and the contrasting philosophies of idealism with focus on the mind (spirit) and materialism with focus on the body (matter), and re-evaluates them in the light of Eastern non-dualistic thinking. True to Eastern tradition, he emphasizes that there exists no clear distinction between body and mind. While this is mainly an Eastern point of view, Yuasa acknowledged that similar thoughts have been expressed also by some Western thinkers, for example Merleau-Ponty. Yasuo goes further than existing philosophical tradition in postulating that the unity of body and mind is not a natural state or innate relationship, but rather a state to be achieved. He points out the crucial role of self-cultivation for achieving such 'oneness of body–mind'.

Expressed in simplified terms, Yuasa's scheme of the body consists in four systems: sensory-motor awareness (somesthesis, much like the sensory-motor apparatus of Bergson or the sensory-motor circuit of Merleau-Ponty), kinaesthetic awareness (kinesthesis), emotion-instinct (governing the autonomic nervous system) and an unconscious 'quasi-body' (exemplified in the ki-energy flow through the body's meridians).

Yasuo distinguishes bright consciousness and dark consciousness, comparing the latter to the Western idea of the unconscious. It has been pointed out that his concept of dark consciousness is more similar to the notion of subconsciousness of Frederic W. H. Myers and William James than to Sigmund Freud's concept of the unconscious.

Yuasa has written numerous books on Western philosophy, psychoanalytic theory, Asian philosophy and on the cultural history of Japan.

He has authored more than 50 books and over 300 articles.

== Writings ==
=== English translations ===
- Yasuo Yuasa: Overcoming Modernity: Synchronicity and Image-Thinking (translated by Shigenori Nagatomo and John W.M. Krummel, with an introduction by Shigenori Nagatomo), State University of New York Press, 2008, ISBN 978-0-7914-7401-3
- Yasuo Yuasa: The Body, Self-Cultivation, and Ki-Energy (translated by Shigenori Nagatomo and Monte S. Hull), 1993, State University of New York Press, ISBN 0-7914-1624-0
- David Edward Shaner, Shigenori Nagatomo, Yasuo Yuasa: Science and Comparative Philosophy: Introducing Yuasa Yasuo, Brill Academic, 1989, ISBN 90-04-08953-5
- Yasuo Yuasa: The Body: Toward an Eastern Mind-Body Theory (translated by Shigenori Nagatomo and Thomas P. Kasulis), State University of New York Press, 1987, ISBN 0-88706-469-8
