= Body theory =

Genre of sociological theories

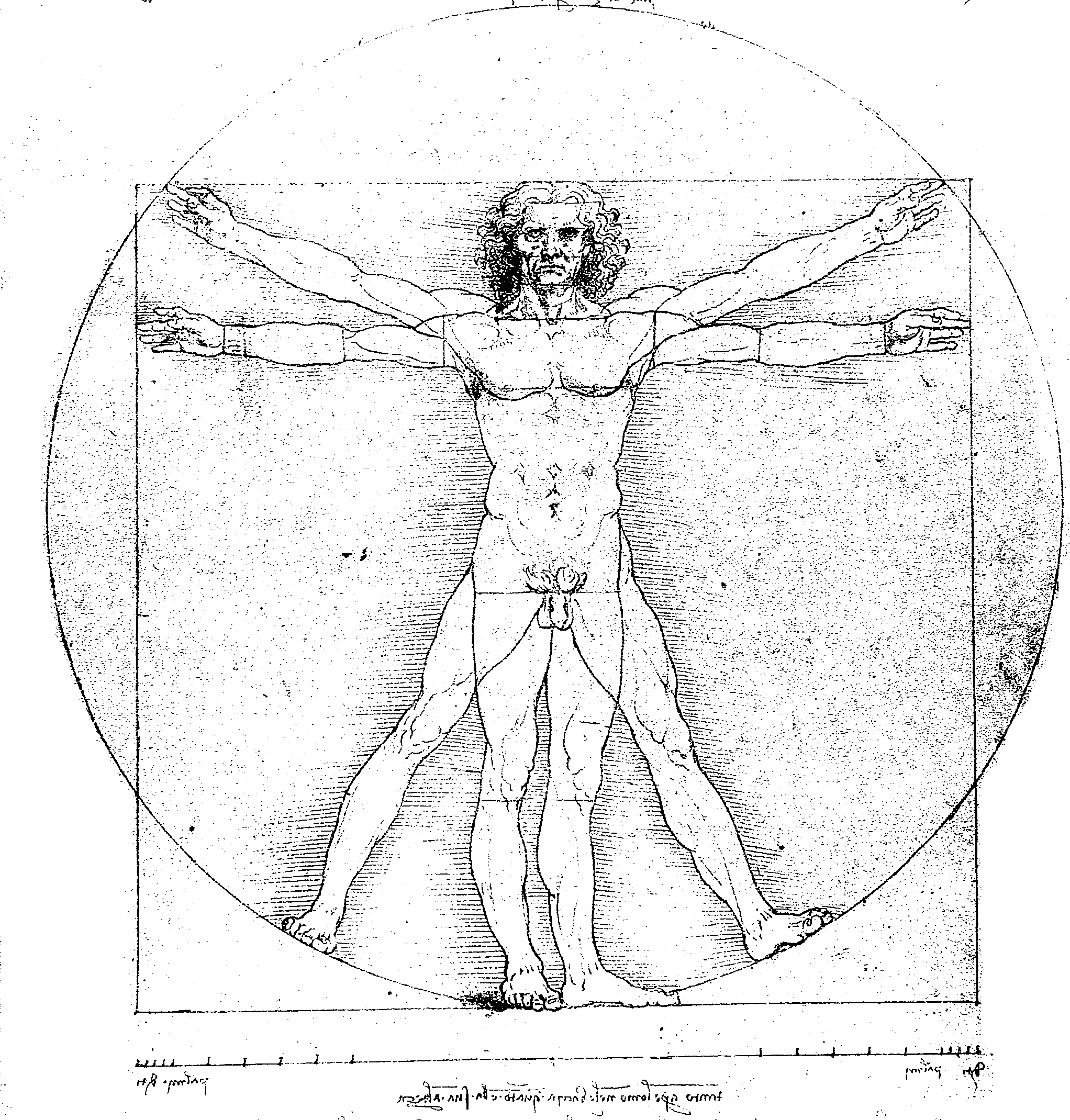
The Vitruvian Man by Leonardo da Vinci, one of the first works to apply higher philosophical ideals to the human form.

In the sociology of the body, body theory is a theory that analyses the human body as an ordered or "lived-in" entity, subject to the cultural and conceptual forces of a society. It is also described as a dynamic field that involves various conceptualizations and re-significations of the body as well as its formation or transformation that affect how bodies are constructed, perceived, evaluated, and experienced.

Body theory is considered one of the traditional theories of personal identity. Noted thinkers who developed their respective body theories include Michel Foucault, Norbert Elias, Roland Barthes, and Yuasa Yasuo.

== Origin and development ==
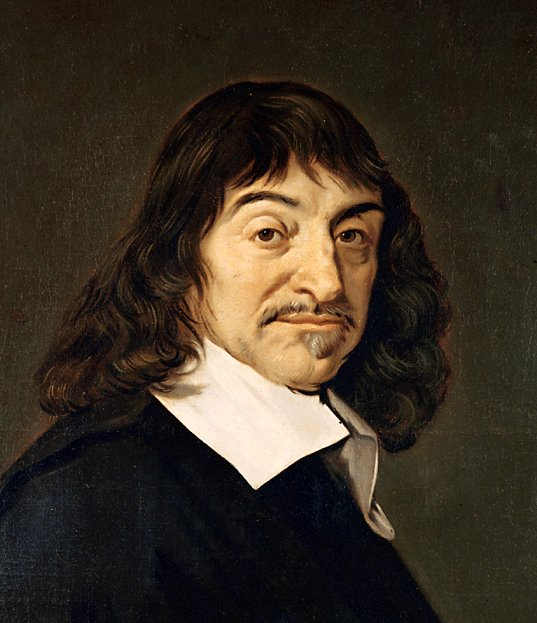
René Descartes's theory holds that what the body perceives is solely understood by the mind's faculty of judgment.

The Western conceptualization of the body has been associated with the theorizing about the self. René Descartes, for instance, distinguished the mind and the body through his notion of mind/body dualism. The developmental trajectory of this theory followed the shifts from the manners that are related to bodily function during the Middle Ages to the modern period with its social forms and the complementary understandings of acceptable bodily behavior. When those theories are evaluated through the idea of bodily abstraction, historical and cultural variations emerge. Scholars identified fundamentally different conceptions based on the qualities they exhibit from the tribal, traditional, modern to postmodern periods. Later developments focus on the growing interest in the materiality of the body - that it is not merely taken as a place to anchor the head.

In the East, body theory is said to have emerged out of the Buddhist intellectual and spiritual history. For example, in the Buddhist notion of "personal cultivation" the body is trained to achieve true knowledge along with one's mind. It also includes the Eastern concept of the authentic self, which - in Japan - pertains to the creative, productive "function" or "field" of life energy. Contemporary theorists such as Ichikawa Hiroshi, Yuasa Yasuo, and Masachi Osawa drew from these traditions and modulated it with current phenomenological concepts of the "lived body". There is also the influence of the Hindu belief, which holds that everything has God-nature. It denies the spirit within body theory as it advocates for the freedom of the spirit from the body. This tradition has spawned modern interpretations and reactions. Peter Bertocci, for instance, maintained that the body is not part of Cosmic Mind but is a society of sub-human selves.

Modern theorists have used the Eastern view of the body to destabilize the Western body theory with its focus on a form of dualism. These include Friedrich Nietzsche, Emmanuel Levinas, and Roland Barthes.

== Freud and early sociology ==
Sigmund Freud explored the concept of the body through his notion of the "bounded body" in the essay Beyond the Pleasure Principle. He noted that a completely closed body is deprived of the means of ongoing life while an absolutely open one without borders would not be a body at all because it would have no ongoing identity. Freud maintained that what is required is a bounded body that has a border or membrane that enables it to have a communion with an outside. German sociologist Norbert Elias, one of the earliest body theorists, posited a related theory, which holds that the body is malleable since it evolves in and is shaped by social configurations. It is also interdependent with other bodies in a variety of ways. This approach to body theory views the body as continually in a flux, undergoing changes, which are many and largely unforeseen. Elias also identified the processes that made it possible for the modern self to emerge within a civilized or controlled body.

== Contemporary philosophy ==
Michel Foucault's theory of the body focuses on how it serves as a site of discourse and power as well as an object of discipline and control. He argued that the materiality of power operates on the bodies of individuals to create the kind of body that the society needs. Recent theories have given rise to labels such as the naturalistic and materialistic body. The former, which sociologist Chris Shilling advocated, focuses on the idea that there is a biological explanation and basis for human behavior. This is demonstrated in the suggestion that human behavior is explained by and encoded within the gene.

Foucault's theory of biopower posits that the modern era is defined by the progression from the deductive state power of being able to take away the life or livelihood of citizens, practiced by absolute monarchies through taxation and capital punishment, to the productive state power practiced by liberal democracies through healthcare and welfare to establish a state monopoly on the acts of granting life and health.

=== Queer and feminist theory ===
Foucault's analysis of the body is frequently cited in queer and feminist theory, which hold the othering of queer or female bodies as a cornerstone of many different types of social disenfranchisement. Interpretations include views of the female body as socially, culturally, and legally defined in terms of its sexual availability to men. Gender scholar Judith Butler is well known for their theory of the social construction of gender, which extends social constructionism and performativity towards male and female bodies as aspects of sex and gender. Butler also argued that the classification, or "citing", of certain types of bodies as queer constitutes a unique form of performance, demonstrated in subcultures such as drag queens as a conflict between the masculine or feminine identities performed in public and the underlying, "unperformable" concepts they represent.

=== Postmodernism ===
A post-modern interpretation of the body theory emerged for the purpose of overturning the universal conceptions of the body. This view, which is called "new-body theory", emphasizes the relationship between the body and the self. It produced the theories that explain the importance of the body in the contemporary social life. These could include different orientations such as those focusing on gender, ethnicity or other socially-constructed differences. For example, a feminist approach looks at domination and subversion as a way of examining the conditions and experiences of embodiment in society. There are also theorists who cite the role that media communications, globalization, international trade, consumerism, education, and political incursions, among others play in theorizing the modern embodied being.

Another post-modern interpretation involves the approach to reading the body in the context of race, class, gender, and sexual orientation. In this view, the material body is understood in terms of social construction where it formed part of conceptualization of the body-as-text metaphor. In the feminist and queer views, for example, the body may be understood through the markings in it that result from violence. There are scholars who note that the post-modern conceptualizations of the body theory tend to be distanced from individuals’ everyday embodied experiences and practices. This is attributed to the focus on the reading of the body as metaphor and the ambivalence towards the material body. This is said to have shifted the attention away from structured categories of difference.

=== Healthism ===
Another area in body theory is called healthism. It approaches the concept of the body, particularly health and disease within the context of the individual. This theoretical strand, which emerged from the subdiscipline in sociology called "sociology of health and illness", addresses the so-called objectification or the reduction of bodily experiences to signifiers of disease and illness. Instead of theorizing the body based on researching external approach or on speculative writing from the psychoanalitic version of the "internal", healthism focuses on how the body is experienced as a way of getting a better theoretical hold of the concept. Some interpretations of this ideology have also drawn from Foucault's works (e.g. Foucault's notion of biopower) to describe the body as a material site where discursive formations are fleshed out.

== See also ==
- Gaze theory
- Body image
- Bodily autonomy
- Reproductive rights
