= Astalon: Tears of the Earth =

2021 game

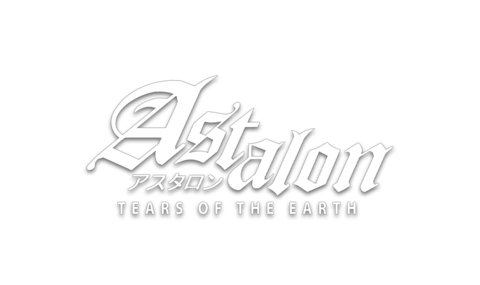
- Astalon: Tears of the Earth logo
- Developer: LABS Works
- Publisher: DANGEN Entertainment
- Designer: Matt Kap
- Programmer: Jon Lepage
- Artists: Matt Kap; Ryūsuke Mita
- Composer: Matt Kap
- Platforms: Microsoft Windows; Nintendo Switch; PlayStation 4 Xbox One
- Release: June 3, 2021
- Genres: Platform, metroidvania
- Mode: Single-player

Astalon: Tears of the Earth is a 2021 video game by LABS Works, published by Japanese publisher Dangen Entertainment. The game's plot revolves around a fighter named Arias, an archer named Kyuli, and a wizard named Algus. The three are on a quest to save their home village from despair as most of the land has turned to desert from the atrocities of an ancient war.

== Gameplay ==
Astalon: Tears of The Earth is an action-platformer and Metroidvania game. The player can switch freely between three characters to use the unique abilities of a warrior, archer and wizard to explore a giant tower and defeat the Gorgons that inhabit it.

== Plot ==
In a world devastated by an epic war between the Earthlings and the Lunarians, the land has become a post-apocalyptic desert, scattered with ruins. Survivors gather in small scattered villages, fighting for their survival. Among these villages is a place where a mysterious tower rises. This tower houses monstrous creatures and strange phenomena. Arias, a courageous knight, Algus, a mage, and Kyuli, a skilled archer, live in the shadow of this menacing tower.

The tower is inhabited by the formidable Gorgons, gigantic creatures of flesh and stone that feed on the inhabitants of the Earth. A sinister cult has formed in a part of the village, worshipping the Gorgons and offering them sacrifices in exchange for protection. However, recently, a catastrophe befalls the village when the river that runs through it is poisoned, leading to the gradual death of its people.

Facing this threat, Arias, Algus, and Kyuli decide to take matters into their own hands. They embark on a quest to uncover the origin of the poison that threatens their village. Their path leads them to the tower, where they confront the Gorgons. In a fierce struggle, they battle these monstrous creatures and uncover the dark secrets of the Tower of Serpents.

At the heart of the tower, they confront the Dark Knight, once sacrificed by the villagers when he was just a baby. Raised by the Gorgons as their champion, he has now become their formidable weapon, ready to exact revenge on the village that abandoned him.

But Algus carries a heavy burden within him. He has made a pact with Epimetheus, the Titan of Death, a being with extraordinary powers. In exchange for the ability to temporarily resurrect the dead, Algus knows that he will have to offer his soul to Epimetheus when the time comes.

== Development ==
Astalon: Tears of The Earth began development in 2016 but was a project that was re-started several times during production. Art and Game Designer Matt Kap was joined in 2018 by Game Programmer Jon Lepage to work on the game together up until the very end. Game developer Matt Kap stated that the first prototype had room-by-room exploration with only one playable character. The second prototype introduced the 3 characters while the third prototype was closer to the completed game.

== Reception ==
Reception

Aggregate scores
Aggregator	Score
Metacritic	(PC) 84/100 (NS) 82/100
OpenCritic	89% recommend

Review scores
Publication	Score
Hardcore Gamer	4/5
Nintendo Life	8/10
Nintendo World Report	9/10
RPGamer	3.5/5
PC Invasion	9/10

Astalon: Tears of the Earth was released on June 3, 2021, on Steam, GOG, Itch.io, Xbox One, PlayStation 4, PlayStation 5, and Nintendo Switch. It was named as the best Metroidvania game of 2021 by PC Gamer.

According to the review aggregation website, the PC and Nintendo Switch versions of Astalon: Tears of the Earth both received generally favorable reviews from critics. Fellow review aggregator OpenCritic assessed that the game received "mighty" approval, being recommended by 89% of critics.

On January 21, 2022, Limited Run Games released physical and collector editions of Astalon: Tears of the Earth for Nintendo Switch and PlayStation 4. All versions sold out.
