= David Boonin =

- Born: David Isaac Boonin; February 14, 1964 (age 62)
- Occupations: Professor; philosopher; ethicist

Education
- Education: Yale University (BA); University of Pittsburgh (PhD)
- Thesis: Thomas Hobbes and the Science of Moral Virtue (1994)

Philosophical work
- Era: Contemporary philosophy
- Institutions: University of Colorado Boulder; Tulane University; Georgetown University
- Main interests: Applied ethics; ethical theories; history of ethics
- Notable works: A Defense of Abortion (2002)

David Isaac Boonin (Note: He has also been identified as David Boonin-Vail in some sources.) (born February 14, 1964) is an American philosopher, ethicist, and professor of philosophy at the University of Colorado Boulder.

== Early life and education ==
David Isaac Boonin was born on February 14, 1964 to Leonard Boonin, who was a professor of philosophy at the University of Colorado, and Harriet Boonin, a public school coordinator. He is Jewish.

In 1986, Boonin graduated from Yale University summa cum laude with a Bachelor of Arts in philosophy and history, and he received his Doctorate of Philosophy in philosophy at the University of Pittsburgh in 1992. His doctorate dissertation was entitled "Thomas Hobbes and the Science of Moral Virtue" and was published in 1994.

== Academic career ==
Boonin taught at Georgetown University from 1992 to 1994 and at Tulane University between 1994 and 1998, before he accepted a position at the University of Colorado Boulder in 1998. His academic interests are in applied ethics, ethical theories, and history of ethics.

In 2002, Boonin published A Defense of Abortion, in which he critiques various anti-abortion arguments and defends abortion as morally permissible. The book received honorable mention for the American Philosophical Assocation's Book Prize competition in 2005. Francis J. Beckwith, a professor of philosophy at Baylor University, described the book in 2006 as a "significant contribution to the literature on this subject and arguably the most important monograph on abortion published in the past twenty years". In 2017, Boonin debated Roman Catholic apologist Trent Horn on the ethics of abortion at Stanford University. In 2019, Boonin released another book on abortion, Beyond Roe: Why Abortion Should be Legal—Even if the Fetus is a Person. In the book, he argues that abortion should be legal even if the fetus is a person; he discusses a court case McFall v. Shimp and argues that a right to life does not entail that one can use someone else's body to be sustained. The principle he appeals to is similar to Judith Jarvis Thomson's violinist analogy.

Boonin has defended the claim that criminal punishment is morally impermissible.
