= Kurokami Captured =

Japanese manga series

黒髪のキャプチュード (Kurokami no Kyapuchādo)
- Genre: Adventure, fantasy
- Manga
- Written by: Ryūsuke Mita
- Published by: Fujimi Shobo/Kadokawa Shoten
- Magazine: Monthly Comic Dragon
- Original run: 1992 – 1997
- Volumes: 7

Kurokami Captured (黒髪のキャプチュード, Kurokami no Kyapuchādo; Darkhair Captured) is a Japanese manga series written and illustrated by Ryūsuke Mita. The story follows a boy endowed with the power of a special ring called General.

== Plot ==
An earthling named Captured and his adventures are in a distant universe where he isn't really wanted because of his black hair which the inhabitants-which are called the land Starians- do not have. Several years ago, he was tormented by the other kids and he found a ring called General. It had the power of Spect'master and the ability to change his arm into a weapon. Along with Manji - his father and a female called Camel, they run a ramen shop between their adventures in order earn enough money to buy a spaceship to return to Earth.

== Characters ==
Captured
The protagonist of Kurokami Captured. He has black hair, blue eyes and a headband. Captured is tortured by the inhabitants because of his black hair (which they lack).He is a Spect'master with the power of General.
Manji
Captured's father who is from Earth but he built a spaceship and left Earth 30 years ago. That was before Captured was born. He must earn 7.8 billion Dottsu - the currency of the land star universe - to buy a spaceship in order to return to his homeland, Japan.
Kyameru'Camel'
The only land Starian who likes Captured. She is tall and blonde. Camel is also a Spect'master. She has four rings although she stops using them later on.
Moonsault
A princess who joins the gang later on. However she frequently fights with Camel.
Full Nelson
One of Mother's four children. Is destroyed by Captured.
Somersault
Another one of Mother's four children. She trained Moonsault. She is destroyed also.
Avanlanche
Another of Mother's four children.
Splash
The most human of Mother's four children and the last one to be introduced. He looks to be fifteen years of age.
Mother
An faceless enemy that is the source of all life of the Land Starians. She has shown a dislike of Captured and Manji and wants to get rid of them for good. She has her own troop of soldiers known as the 'Mother guard'.
