= Koharu Kisaragi =

Japanese writer (1956–2000)

Koharu Kisaragi (Japanese: 如月小春; February 19, 1956 – December 19, 2000) was a Japanese playwright, director, and essayist. The founder of the theater company NOISE, she worked as a playwright and director starting in the late 1970s, becoming, alongside Hideki Noda and Eri Watanabe, one of the leaders of the Third Generation of Japanese small theater. She had a lasting influence on contemporary Japanese women's theater.

Kisaragi was also a prolific essayist and appeared on television as a host and commentator. She served as the founding chair of the Asian Women's Theater Conference, as a member of UNESCO's Japanese National Commission, and as an instructor at Rikkyo University.

== Early life and education ==
Masako Ito (Japanese: 伊藤正子) was born in Suginami, Tokyo, in 1956. She later became Masako Kajiya (Japanese: 楫屋正子) after her marriage, but she is best known by her pen name Koharu Kisaragi.

Kisaragi attended middle and high school at Seikei Junior and Senior High School in Musashino. She also studied at Cowra High School in New South Wales, Australia, through an exchange program with her high school. Beginning in 1974, she studied philosophy at Tokyo Woman's Christian University.

== Career ==
While in college, Kisaragi became involved in theater, co-founding the University of Tokyo-affiliated intercollegiate theatrical troupe Kiki (Japanese: 綺畸). In 1976, she published her first play, Ryusei Ingakan (Japanese: 流星陰画館). She then wrote and directed the plays Romeo and Freesia at the Dining Table (Japanese: ロミオとフリージアのある食卓; 1979), ANOTHER (1981), and Factory Story (Japanese: 工場物語, 1982). She worked in the same theater company as Akiko Takeuchi, Masumi Takikawa, and Shunya Yoshimi.

In addition to her work in the theater, after graduating college, she spent a year in an office job, then taught at a juku.

After leaving the Kiki troupe in 1982, that fall she put on the show Photosynthesis Party (Japanese: 光合成Party) with her husband, Kazuyuki Kajiya. In 1983, she founded her own theater company, NOISE, with whom she staged such productions as DOLL (1983) and MORAL (1984–1986). Kisaragi's plays frequently dealt with the realities of urban life and included meta-commentary on the act of creating theater. These performances often combined traditional theater with other media, such as music and film.

NOISE had around 30 members, led by Kisaragi as its primary playwright and director, and it was described in the media as an "urbanite theater group." It disbanded in 1994, although Kisaragi continued to produce occasional performances with former members of the group, including her husband.

In 1988, she represented Japan at the first International Women Playwrights Conference in Buffalo, New York. Beginning in 1991, she held a series of theater workshops at the Hyogo Children's Museum. In 1992, she was chosen as chair of the inaugural Asian Women's Theater Conference.

== Death ==
In 2000, Kisaragi was hospitalized after losing consciousness in a classroom at Rikkyo University. She died less than two weeks later, of a subarachnoid hemorrhage, at age 44. She left her husband and one daughter, as well as a vast but incomplete body of work.

She had been scheduled to chair the following year's Asian Women's Theater Conference, which Rio Kishida did in her place.

== Selected works ==
=== Staged plays ===
- 流星陰画館 ― 星影の残酷メルヘン
- 新御伽草子'79 ― 雪の小石川編
- ロミオとフリージアのある食卓 ― 悲恋中野区編
- 光の時代
- 家、世の果ての... ― 怪談・武蔵野編
- ANOTHER
- 工場物語
- Art Collection 1 ― 光合成Party
- DOLL
- リア王の青い城
- トロイメライ ― 子供の情景
- MORAL
- Art Collection 4 ― Dancing Voice
- MORAL 2nd
- ISLAND
- SAMSA
- 砂漠のように、やさしく
- NIPPON CHA! CHA! CHA!
- MOON
- ESCAPE
- 夏の夜のアリスたち
- 夜の学校
- A・R ― 芥川龍之介素描
- 月夜のサンタマリア
- 朝、冷たい水で
- モホイの涙
- テン、テン、天まで飛んでいけ

=== Television ===
- 日本語再発見
- 週刊ブックレビュー
- スタジオL 木曜日

=== Radio ===
- 坂本龍一と如月小春のラジオパフォーマンス「LIFE」(1984)

=== Music ===
- NEO PLANT (1986; produced by Ryuichi Sakamoto)
- 都会の生活 (1986)

=== Publications ===
==== Plays and collections ====
- 如月小春戯曲集』(1982)
- 『工場物語』(1983)
- 『如月小春のしばい』(1984)
- 『DOLL』(1985)
- 『MORAL』(1987)
- 『NIPPON・CHA!CHA!CHA!』(1988)
- 『DOLL/トロイメライ』(1993)
- 『DOLL/トロイメライ』(2001)
- 『如月小春精選戯曲集』(2001)
- 『DOLL - 如月小春が遺した美しい7つの物語 如月小春精選戯曲集2』(2017)

==== Essays, criticism, and interviews ====
- 如月小春のフィールドノート』(1984)
- 『はな子さん、いってらっしゃい - 如月小春Tokiology live』(1984)
- 『都市の遊び方』(1986)
- 『私の耳は都市の耳』(1986)
- 『都市民族の芝居小屋』(1987)
- 『鏡の中の人間 - 如月小春サイエンス・インタヴュー集』(1988)
- 『はな子さんの文学探検』(1988)
- 『東京ガール』(1989)
- 『もう一人の、私』(1995)
- 『八月のこどもたち - 劇団NOISE・91夏・ワークショップの記録』(1996)
- 『ピーヒャラドンの謎 - 演出家がハハになった』(1999)
- 『俳優の領分 - 中村伸郎と昭和の劇作家たち』(2006)

==== Novels ====
- 『子規からの手紙』(1993)
