= Mental Health Act (Ontario) =

Ontario provincial law

The Mental Health Act (French: Loi sur la santé mentale) is an Ontario law that regulates the admission of patients to psychiatric facilities in Ontario. The main purpose of the legislation is to establish patient rights and regulate the involuntary admission of people into a psychiatric hospital. Since the changes brought about in 2000 under Bill 68 (often referred to as Brian's Law, named after Brian Smith who was shot dead in 1995 by a person suffering from paranoid schizophrenia), the Act allows for a community treatment order (also called a "CTO") by the attending physician. A Community Treatment Order is intended to provide comprehensive treatment outside of a psychiatric facility. Community Treatment Orders allow complete freedom to carry on with work or school, while living in any neighborhood, and taking medicine on a regular basis. Support is offered by health professionals called Assertive Community Treatment teams to avoid serious relapse which may require hospitalization. Ontario has over 70 locations for ACT teams.

== Pathways to Assessment ==
The following are three common ways that a person may be involuntarily admitted to a psychiatric facility (unit) in Ontario for a 72-hour observation period:

=== Police brings person to physician ===
When a person is acting in a disorderly manner, section 17 of the Act allows the police to apprehend someone and take them to a designated psychiatric facility for examination by a physician if they believe that the person is an immediate danger to themself, an immediate danger to others, or not able to care for themselves to an extent that physical impairment will result. The officer must believe, implicitly, that the immediate nature of the threat precludes the use of section 16 (Bringing Information before a justice of the peace).

=== Person lays information before Justice of Peace (Form 2) ===
In situations where there is no immediate danger, anyone (though usually family) can bring evidence to a justice of the peace that the person is a danger to themselves, a danger to others, or is not able to care for themselves. The justice of the peace can then order a person to be examined by a physician by filling out a Form 2 authorizing the police to take the person to a physician for examination.

A Form 2 does not guarantee that the person receives treatment. It is simply a mechanism by which to bring them to a hospital for assessment.

=== Physician orders assessment (Form 1) ===
A physician outside a hospital, such as a family doctor, has authority to sign a document known as a Form 1, which can be used to seek a psychiatric assessment.

Where a physician examines a person and has reasonable cause to believe that the person,

    (a) has threatened or attempted or is threatening or attempting to cause bodily harm to himself or herself;
    (b) has behaved or is behaving violently towards another person or has caused or is causing another person to fear bodily harm from         him or her; or
    (c) has shown or is showing a lack of competence to care for himself or herself,

and if in addition, the physician is of the opinion that the person is apparently suffering from mental disorder of a nature or quality that likely will result in,

    (d) serious bodily harm to the person;
    (e) serious bodily harm to another person; or
    (f) serious physical impairment of the person,

the physician may make an application in the prescribed form for a psychiatric assessment of the person.

Or, where a physician examines a person and has reasonable cause to believe that the person,

    (a) has previously received treatment for mental disorder of an ongoing or recurring nature that, when not treated, is of a nature or quality that likely will result in serious bodily harm to the person or to another person or substantial mental or physical deterioration of the person or serious physical impairment of the person; and
    (b) has shown clinical improvement as a result of the treatment,

and if in addition the physician is of the opinion that the person,

    (c) is apparently suffering from the same mental disorder as the one for which he or she previously received treatment or from a mental disorder that is similar to the previous one;
    (d) given the person’s history of mental disorder and current mental or physical condition, is likely to cause serious bodily harm to himself or herself or to another person or is likely to suffer substantial mental or physical deterioration or serious physical impairment; and
    (e) is incapable, within the meaning of the Health Care Consent Act, 1996, of consenting to his or her treatment in a psychiatric facility and the consent of his or her substitute decision-maker has been obtained,

the physician may make application in the prescribed form for a psychiatric assessment of the person.

A Form 1 does not guarantee that the person will be treated. The physician fills out a Form 1 authorizing the police to bring the person in for a psychiatric assessment.

== Involuntary admissions ==
Once a person has been brought to an emergency department or psychiatric facility to be assessed, the physician may hold them there for up to 72 hours on an application for psychiatric assessment (Form 1). This form allows the person to be held at a psychiatric facility for assessment, but does not itself permit any treatment without the person's consent.

Consent to treatment is not covered under the Mental Health Act but rather the Health Care Consent Act. The physician must also fill out a Form 42 to notify the person and inform them of why they're being held.

At the end of the 72 hours permitted by a Form 1, the person must either be released, be admitted as a voluntary patient, or continue to be held as an involuntary patient with a certificate of involuntary admission (Form 3).

A Form 3 is typically signed by a psychiatrist. The physician who signs the Form 3 must be different than the physician who signed the initial Form 1.

A Form 3 allows the patient to be held for up to two weeks and the patient must be notified with a Form 30. In some cases, a patient may be transferred to another hospital if the facility to which they were initially brought is not a designated psychiatric facility.

At the end of the two weeks, if the facility is to continue to keep the patient on an involuntary basis, a certificate of renewal (Form 4) must be filled out. The first time a Form 4 is filled out, it is valid for one month, the second time it is filled out it is valid for two months, each time after that, it is valid for three months. Each time a Form 4 is filled out, another Form 30 must be filled out, notifying the patient and the patient has a right to appeal the Form 4 at the Consent and Capacity Board.

=== Rights of the patient ===
A physician who places a person on a Form 3 or Form 4 is required to notify a rights adviser who is required to meet with the patient and explain to the patient what his or her rights are. If the patient requests it, a rights adviser will also help the patient apply for an appeal or acquire legal services.

If a patient is placed on a Form 3 or Form 4, they have the right to appeal the decision to a Consent and Capacity Board which will hear the patient's and physician's case. A patient's involuntary status is reviewed by the Board every year whether the patient requests it or not.

The board is composed, at the minimum, of a lawyer, a psychiatrist, and a member of the community.

If the patient or physician disagrees with the Board's decision, they may appeal to the Ontario Superior Court of Justice. In some cases, such appeals are funded by Legal Aid Ontario.

Admission to a psychiatric facility does not necessarily equate to treatment. Treatment is dealt with under a different statutory scheme and depends on the patient's capacity. Contrary to popular belief, it is not the patient's age that dictates their capacity but rather a legal test under section 4 of the Health Care Consent Act.

== Community treatment orders ==
The Act states that "the purpose of a community treatment order is to provide a person who suffers from a serious mental disorder with a comprehensive plan of community-based treatment or care and supervision that is less restrictive than being detained in a psychiatric facility. ... [and] to provide such a plan for a person who, as a result of his or her serious mental disorder, experiences this pattern: The person is admitted to a psychiatric facility where his or her condition is usually stabilized; after being released from the facility, the person often stops the treatment or care and supervision; the person’s condition changes and, as a result, the person must be re-admitted to a psychiatric facility." Community treatment orders are intended to stop the cycle of "revolving door patients."

When a physician decides that a patient meets the criteria for a community treatment order, a treatment plan is developed with the involvement of all people involved in the plan. In addition to the physician and the patient, people involved in the plan may include other health care workers, social workers, family members, the substitute decision-maker, or others. Once the treatment plan is agreed to by all parties, the patient is required to follow the plan while living in the community. Failing to follow the plan can result in the person being readmitted to the hospital on a Form 47. One notable aspect of the community treatment orders is that it allows anyone who is named in the treatment plan to communicate with each other for the purpose of providing treatment, care, or supervision of the person. By removing barriers to communication between members of the health care team, appropriate interventions can be quickly applied when the person is at risk.

A community treatment order lasts six months and can be renewed if needed. A person on a community treatment order has the right to see a rights advisor and to appeal to the Consent and Capacity Board. The Board will review community treatment order every year whether the patient requests it or not.

== Miscellaneous ==
- Under the Act, it is not permitted to administer psychosurgery to a patient who is considered incompetent to consent to treatment.

== See also ==
- Ministry of Health (Ontario)
- Health Care Consent Act (Ontario)
- Substitute Decisions Act
- Personal Health Information Protection Act (Ontario)
- Ontario Mental Health Act
- Revised Statutes of Ontario
- Psychiatric Patient Advocate Office
- Consent and Capacity Board
- Mental Health and Addictions | Ontario Health
