= Shunya Yoshimi =

Japanese sociologist (born 1957)

Shunya Yoshimi (吉見 俊哉, Yoshimi Shun'ya; born April 22, 1957 in Japan) is a Japanese sociologist.

He is a professor at the Interfaculty Initiative in Information Studies, the University of Tokyo. He is one of the most influential cultural sociologists in Japan and best known for helping introduce cultural studies to Japan. His research topics include cultural studies, media studies and urban sociology.

Yoshimi has authored several books on subjects such as cultural theory, urban culture, international exposition, media culture, information technology, the emperor system, and the Americanization of modern Japan and East Asia.

Yoshimi's works in Japanese include Dramaturgy in the City: A Social History of Popular Entertainments in Modern Tokyo (Kobundo, 1987), The Politics of Exposition: Imperialism, Commercialism and Popular Entertainment (Chuokoronsha, 1992), Cultural Sociology in the Media Age (Shinyosha, 1994), Voice of Capitalism: The Social Construction of Telephone, Gramophone and Radio in Japan (Kodansha, 1995), Expo Syndrome: Postwar Politics and Cultural Struggle in Postwar Japan (Chikuma Shobo, 2005), and Pro-America, Anti-America: Political Unconsciousness in Postwar Japan (Iwanami Shoten, 2007).

He was the dean of the Interfaculty Initiative in Information Studies, the University of Tokyo (2006-2008) and currently a vice president of the University of Tokyo.

== Teaching Posts and Memberships ==
Yoshimi has been involved with universities and colleges the world over. He was a visiting fellow of El Colegio de México (1993), Ecole des Hautes Etudes Sciences Sociales (1998), University of Western Sydney (1999), and University of Queensland (2000). Yoshimi is also a member of numerous committees and boards. He is a member of the executive committee of Inter-Asia Cultural Studies (Routledge), is part of the editorial board of Cultural Studies (Routledge), one of the associate editors of Theory, Culture & Society (Sage), and a member of the editorial advisory board of Japanese Studies (Carfax Publishing).

== See also ==
- Munesuke Mita
- Kang Sang-jung
- Akihiro Kitada
