= Akihiro Kitada =

Japanese sociologist

Akihiro Kitada (北田 暁大, Kitada Akihiro; born December 28, 1971) is a Japanese sociologist and a professor at the Interfaculty Initiative in Information Studies, University of Tokyo.

He received his PhD from the University of Tokyo in 2004. Before he took his current position in 2003, he was teaching at the University of Tsukuba. He was a visiting professor at Leipzig University in 2011.

His research topics include theoretical sociology, cultural sociology and history of media. He has acquired a reputation for his analysis of advertising, early cinema, magazines, TV, internet and other forms of media in modern and contemporary Japan as well as for his theoretical writings on culture and media. He is known among the reading public in Japan for co-editing the journal Shiso chizu (思想地図) with the cultural critic Hiroki Azuma during its first years.

== Bibliography ==
=== In English ===
- 'Japan's cynical nationalism' in Mizuko Ito, Daisuke Okabe, Izumi Tsuji (eds.) Fandom Unbound: Otaku Culture in a Connected World, Yale University Press, 2012. (An excerpted translation from his book Warau Nihon no "Nationalism" 『嗤う日本の「ナショナリズム」』 )
- Kitada Akihiro, “An Assault on ‘Meaning’: On Nakai Masakazu's Concept of ‘Mediation,’" trans. Alexander Zahlten, in Review of Japanese Culture and Society (December 2010), pp. 88–103.

== See also ==
- Hiroki Azuma
- Shunya Yoshimi
