= Kiyokazu Washida =

Japanese philosopher

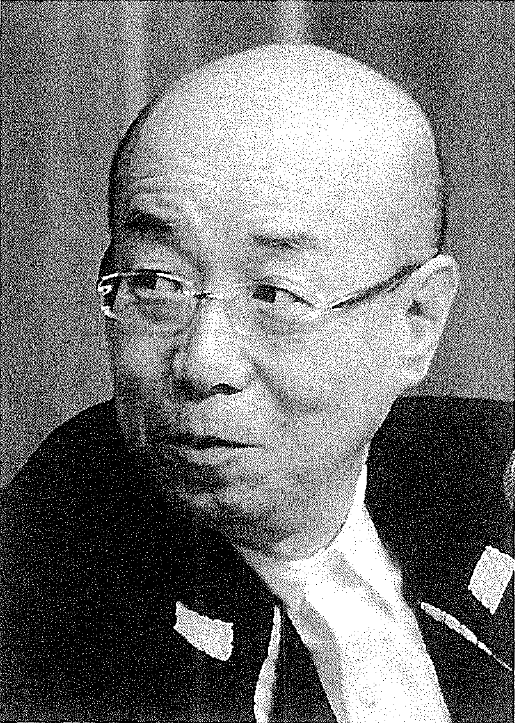
- 2009
- Born: September 2, 1949; Kyoto
- Awards: Suntory Prize for Social Sciences and Humanities, History and Civilization (1989), Medal with Purple Ribbon from the Japanese government (2004)
- Scientific career
- Fields: Philosophy

Kiyokazu Washida (鷲田 清一, Washida Kiyokazu) is a Japanese philosopher, specializing in clinical philosophy and ethics. He was born in Kyoto, Japan, and is currently a professor at Otani University. He was the 16th president of Osaka University and served on the screening committee of the Jirō Osaragi Prize, and the Suntory Prize for Social Sciences and Humanities.

== Chronology ==
- March 1972 - graduated from the Faculty of Letters, Kyoto University
- April 1978 - lecturer at Kansai University
- April 1992 - associate professor in the School of Letters, Osaka University
- April 1996 - professor at the same school
- August 2003 - dean of the School of Letters
- August 2007 - 16th president of Osaka University
- September 2011 - professor at Otani University

== Awards ==
- Suntory Prize for Social Sciences and Humanities, History and Civilization (1989)
- Kuwabarata Takeo Prize (2000)
- Medal with Purple Ribbon from the Japanese government (2004)

== Publications ==
- Bunsansuru risei: Genshogaku no shisen (in Japanese) (Dai 1-han ed.). Keiso Shobo. 1989. ISBN 978-4-326-15215-5..
- Modo no meikyu (in Japanese) (Shohan ed.). Chuo Koronsha. 1989. ISBN 978-4-12-001792-6..
- Kimochi no ii hanashi (in Japanese). Shichōsha. 2001. ISBN 978-4-7837-1598-6.
