= Health Care Consent Act =

Ontario, Canada statute

The Health Care Consent Act (HCCA) is an Ontario law concerned with the capacity to consent to treatment and admission to care facilities. (i.e., informed consent). As of 2 August 2023 on a date to be named by proclamation of the Lieutenant Governor, the act will also apply to confining in a care facility.

The HCCA states that a person has the right to consent to or refuse treatment if they have mental capacity. In order to have capacity, a person must have the "ability" to understand and appreciate the consequences of the treatment decision. The law says that “a person is capable with respect to a treatment, admission to a care facility or a personal assistance service if the person is able to understand the information that is relevant to making a decision about the treatment, admission or personal assistance service, as the case may be, and able to appreciate the reasonably foreseeable consequences of a decision or lack of decision”.

== Relationship to other Acts ==
The HCCA exists in addition to the Ontario Mental Health Act (MHA) because, while the MHA governs detention in a psychiatric facility, the HCCA governs whether or not a person can be treated while in hospital (for example, with anti-psychotic medication that can reduce symptoms of serious mental illness such as schizophrenia).

The Ontario HCCA is also relevant to the Substitute Decisions Act. A person may be found to lack capacity for personal care and need a substitute decision maker (SDM) to decide whether to consent to or refuse treatment with psychiatric medication. The law says that “a person is incapable of personal care if the person is not able to understand information that is relevant to making a decision concerning his or her own health care, nutrition, shelter, clothing, hygiene or safety, or is not able to appreciate the reasonably foreseeable consequences of a decision or lack of decision.”

== HCCA and the Right to Refuse Treatment ==
There is a widely reported Supreme Court of Canada case called Starson v. Swayze that dealt with the right of a mentally ill person to refuse treatment, even if it is in their best interests to be treated (for example, with anti-psychotic medication that would reduce delusional thinking).

The majority in Starson v. Swayze ultimately decided that Starson did not lack capacity so he could make his own treatment decisions, even if his decision (to refuse anti-psychotic medication that would reduce delusional thinking) was not in his best interests. As a result, he could not be treated with psychiatric medication, even if that meant that his health deteriorated as a result.

Critics of the decision in Starson argue that, because of mental deterioration, Starson did not have the capacity to make the decision to refuse treatment, and that his right to autonomy needs to be balanced with the right to be well. See also: autonomy as opposed to paternalism or beneficence. Autonomy is a complex concept in bioethics that has many variations. For example, there is the concept of supported autonomy, that is, in order to support the autonomy of the person in the long term it may be necessary to compromise autonomy in the short term.
