= Ryūsuke Mita =

Japanese manga artist

Ryūsuke Mita (見田 竜介, Mita Ryūsuke; born August 24, 1967) is a Japanese manga artist. He is best known as the creator of Dragon Half, which was adapted into an OVA series animated by Production I.G by the same name. He also illustrates Futabasha game books under the pen name Futeki Banzai (不敵万才). Mita's father was Munesuke Mita, a well-known Japanese sociologist, and his grandfather was Sekisuke Mita, a Marxist economist. He is married to manga creator Chiaki Ogishima, who drew the manga adaptation of Heat Guy J. They also work together under the name, Aya Hanagatami (花筐絢) and create adult manga marketed towards women.

== Brief biography ==
Mita attended Tokyo Metropolitan Hachiōji High School, where during his senior year he spent a lot of time getting into fights. After graduating from high school, he attended Tokyo Animator Academy. After working as an inker and painter on Laputa: Castle in the Sky for Studio Ghibli, he decided to leave school in the middle of the term and began working at Studio Hard. He began doing illustration work for game magazines under his Futeki Banzai pen name, and in 1988, Mita made his debut in Gekkan Dragon Magazine.

From 2003, Mita began suffering from cataracts (his father also had cataract problems). In 2005, Mita's official website suddenly stopped being updated, with the following message appearing on the main page: We think we want to make a fresh start as manga artists (新たな気持ちで漫画家として再出発したいと思います, Arata na kimochi de mangaka toshite saishuppatsushitai to omoimasu). The message has since been changed to indicate that Mita and his wife would be opening separate official sites. He published a seinen manga titled Rose Rosse in the September 2005 issue of Comic Bazooka Venus. In 2007 he published another seinen manga called Oh My Master.

== Works ==
=== Manga ===
- Aiten Myōō Monogatari
- Dragon Half
- Kaizō Shōjo Yuzu
- Kurokami Captured
- Rose Rosse
- Senkōka Rubikura
- Shugen Byakuryū Rubikura
- Shugen Musume Tenguri

=== Game character design ===
- Quiz Avenue
- Shenan Dragon
- Astalon: Tears of the Earth

Ryuusuke Mita is also the designer for the Monster Collection trading card game for Group SNE (which the anime Mon Colle Knights was based on).
