= Shinji Miyadai =

Japanese sociologist

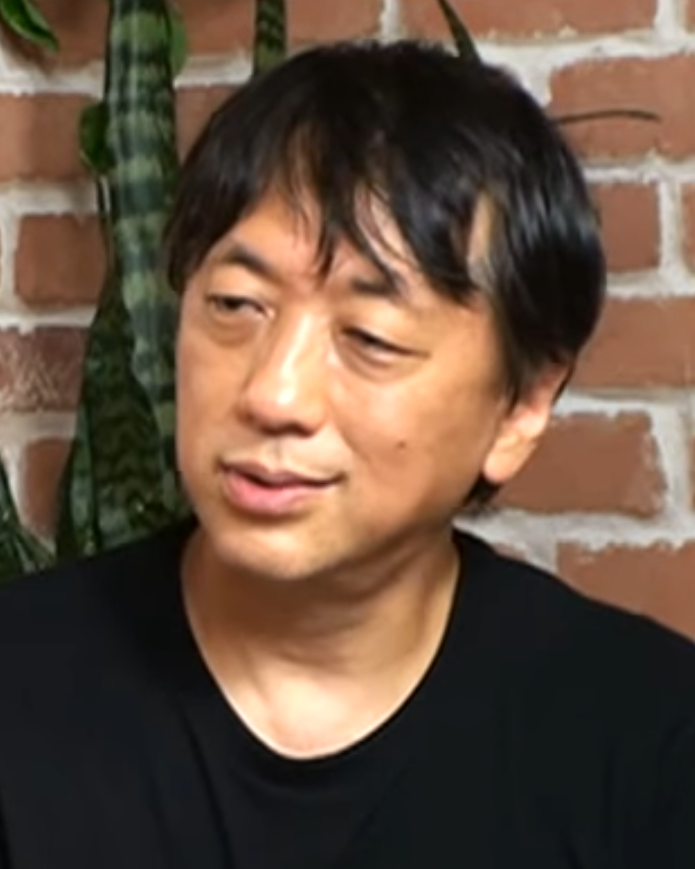

Shinji Miyadai (宮台 真司, Miyadai Shinji; born 3 March 1959 in Sendai, Japan) is a Japanese sociologist and professor at Tokyo Metropolitan University.

== Education ==
Miyadai has a PhD from the University of Tokyo for his research on Mathematical sociology.

== Academic career ==
Using the method of game theory, he analyzed how the power of the state works in society. He is one of the most outspoken sociologists in Japan, and is currently working on the strategy the Japanese government should adopt for the 21st century.

He has been a constant presence in the world of Japanese letters since the publication of his PhD dissertation in 1989. His controversial work on compensated dating in Japan was the subject of much discussion after its publication.

== History ==
On 29 November 2022, Miyadai was attacked at the Minami-Osawa campus in Hachioji in a widely-reported knife attack. A suspect in the attack committed suicide on 16 December 2022 without explaining his motives.
