= Substitute Decisions Act =

Law of Ontario, Canada

The Substitute Decisions Act (French: Loi de 1992 sur la prise de décisions au nom d'autrui) (the Act) is an act of the Legislative Assembly of Ontario in Ontario, Canada. It establishes the legal criteria determining when a person has the ability to make decisions that are fundamental to his/her well-being. The ability to make these types of decisions is termed capacity and the decisions are termed consent. Capacity establishes the legal right to consent to or refuse medical treatment, choose housing arrangements and manage one's money. However, there are different tests for capacity that vary according to the type of decisions that must be made. In some instances, capacity will exist for people who do not have full capacity in the common sense understanding of the concept.

== Capacity and incapacity ==
Capacity is presumed under the Act if the person is over 18 for management of property or 16 for personal care decisions. This means that before a person's right to make decisions for him/herself is removed it must be proven that they do not have capacity. Incapacity is the term for a person who cannot make these decisions.

In terms of personal care, incapacity is defined as not being able to "understand information that is relevant to making a decision concerning his or her own health care, nutrition, shelter, clothing, hygiene or safety, or is not able to appreciate the reasonably foreseeable consequences of a decision or lack of decision." The key concepts are understanding information about a condition and appreciating the results of treatment options, including refusing treatment.

In terms of managing one's property, incapacity is similarly defined as being unable to "understand information that is relevant to making a decision in the management of his or her property, or is not able to appreciate the reasonably foreseeable consequences of a decision or lack of decision."

== Substitute decision-makers ==
If a person is found to be incapable they will have a substitute decision-maker appointed for them. A substitute decision-maker may be a family member, non-family members are exceptionally rare. The Office of the Public Guardian and Trustee may also be appointed to this role.

Whoever is appointed to make decisions for an incapable person is expected to make them in keeping with the same principles of the legislation, understanding the relevant information and appreciating the consequences of decisions. Decisions should also incorporate what can be reasonably known about the person's likely opinions, including preferences and cultural attitudes. A substitute decision-maker can be replaced if they are found to be not meeting their obligations.

== Right to refuse an assessment ==
Under the Act, incapacity can only be determined by a formal assessment. However, a person has the right to refuse to be assessed. To ensure that this right is upheld, an assessor, prior to beginning an assessment must tell the person being assessed what they are doing, what is its purpose, what impact their finding will have and that the person being assessed has the right to refuse. If a person refuses to an assessment it cannot be conducted.

There are limits to a person's right to refuse an assessment. A Court may order an assessment of a person's capacity against their will if it determines that there are reasonable grounds to suspect that the person does not have capacity.

== Assessment ==
The Capacity Assessment Office maintains a limited register of Capacity Assessors, who must be licensed physicians, psychologists, registered nurses, registered social workers or occupational therapists. Assessors must also hold liability insurance for up to $1,000,000, successfully complete a training course with the Capacity Assessment Office and complete ongoing continuing education. The Capacity Assessment Office does not make specific referrals, but they will provide the names of several Assessors based on a client's needs and location.

Assessments aim to answer the question of whether a person has capacity in keeping with the legislation. Exactly what methods they will use often depends on the skill set of the specific Assessor and the nature of the problem that they face. In other words, an assessment should always be comprehensive enough to understand a person's ability to make decisions for him/herself, but the decision may require only limited capacity. In this case, it can occur that a person who does not have full cognitive ability can still have capacity to make important decisions.

== Government Organizations involved with incapacity ==
=== Capacity Assessment Office ===
In Ontario, the Office of the Ministry of the Attorney General oversees the Capacity Assessment Office. The Capacity Assessment Office ensures that only licensed Capacity Assessors are allowed to conduct capacity assessments and can assist members of the public in finding Capacity Assessors.

=== Office of the Public Guardian and Trustee ===
When a person has been found to be incapable the Office of the Public Guardian and Trustee can be appointed to manage their property, which includes their money, real estate, investments, bank accounts, and vehicles.

=== Consent and Capacity Board ===
A person who has been found incapable with respect to property management can appeal their finding before the Consent and Capacity Board. This Board is Composed of public and professional members and will review the history of a person's finding of incapacity and any history since that time. Reviews are permitted on a more frequent basis when incapacity is first determined and then become more periodic once a set period of time has elapsed. A person is always eligible to have their capacity reviewed.

Public versions of the reasons for decisions of the Consent and Capacity Board are published through CanLII and available in a searchable format on the CanLII website, but only the signed original in the Board file serves as the official version of the reasons for decisions.

=== Regulatory bodies ===
Since only regulated professionals are allowed to conduct capacity assessments, a person who believes that they have been treated unfairly by their assessor can lodge a complaint at the assessor's respective self-governing regulatory body. The self-governing bodies are: the College of Physicians and Surgeons of Ontario; the College of Psychologists of Ontario; The Colleges of Nurses of Ontario; The College of Social Workers and Social Service Workers and The Occupational Therapists College of Ontario. In addition, if a person feels that their lawyer has acted in a way that has caused them harm, they can contact the Law Society of Ontario.

== Controversies ==
=== "Hired Gun" Assessors ===
There is a danger that assessors will not be fully objective in certain circumstances. This conduct is most often associated with a professional who believes that his/her referral source will provide future business on the basis of receiving a predetermining finding. This type of misconduct can have serious negative impacts for a client. If a person who is capable is labelled as incapable their rights will be severely violated without just cause. On the other hand, a person who is incapable and is found capable is at risk of causing harm to him/herself or others.

=== "Slippery Slope" ===
It is a danger for people who are found incapable that they will be put into circumstances that steadily erode their independence. Careful attention must be devoted to ensuring that the extents of incapacity, as well as existing capacities, are appreciated and balanced so that a person can be independent to the greatest extent possible.

It is also a concern on the part of many people found incapable, their family and patient advocates that careful attention is given to ensuring that treatments do not cause further incapacity. This concern has particular bearing for psychotropic medication and other treatments that affect the brain.

=== Exploitation ===
A person who loses the right to make decisions on their behalf is exceptionally vulnerable to many types of exploitation. A common form of exploitation is the expropriation of money for purposes that do not benefit the patient and are often clearly fraudulent. This type of exploitation can be perpetrated by a substitute decision-maker, an employee of the Office of the Public Guardian and Trustee, a lawyer representing the client or an employee in an institution.

Other types of exploitation can include abuse and neglect.

=== Failure to receive "necessary care" versus "personal autonomy" ===
There are times when the family or friends of a person, or their community as a whole, may believe that a person needs access to care that they are unwilling or unable to provide to themselves. On the other hand, many of these types of decisions are the most fundamentally personal and private decisions that a person will ever make. There is a conflict of interest in that the community's reasons for wanting a course of action to be imposed on a person are not necessarily the same as that person's, yet he/she is the one who will be required to make the change.

== See also ==
- Mental Health Act (Ontario)
- Health Care Consent Act (Ontario)
- The ABCs of Substitute Decision Making; a free webinar available through YourLegalRights Ontario.
