= Dragon Half =

Japanese manga series

- Cover of the first manga volume (Kindle edition)

ドラゴンハーフ (Doragon Hāfu)
- Genre: Sword and sorcery
- Manga
- Written by: Ryūsuke Mita
- Published by: Fujimi Shobo
- English publisher: NA: Seven Seas Entertainment
- Magazine: Dragon Magazine
- Original run: January 30, 1988 – April 30, 1994
- Volumes: 7
- Original video animation
- Directed by: Shinya Sadamitsu
- Produced by: Mitsuhisa Ishikawa; Shirō Sasaki
- Written by: Shinya Sadamitsu
- Music by: Kohei Tanaka
- Studio: Production I.G
- Licensed by: NA: Discotek Media
- Released: March 26, 1993 – May 28, 1993
- Episodes: 2

Dragon Half (Japanese: ドラゴンハーフ, Hepburn: Doragon Hāfu) is a Japanese manga series written and illustrated by Ryūsuke Mita. The manga was serialized in Fujimi Shobo's Dragon Magazine from January 30, 1988, to April 30, 1994, and the chapters collected into 7 tankōbon volumes. It was adapted into a 2-episode OVA series animated by Production I.G in 1993. ADV Films had previously licensed the anime series in North America. Discotek Media has since re-licensed the OVAs for a DVD release in 2014. The manga has been licensed in North America by Seven Seas Entertainment.

The story follows Mink, a half-human half-dragon teenage girl on a quest for a potion which will turn her into a full human so that she can win the love of the legendary dragon slayer/crooner Dick Saucer. In the manga, in order to get the potion, she must slay Azetodeth, the greatest demon in the land.

The story is very tongue-in-cheek, and pokes fun at a number of anime clichés, including the overuse of super deformation, across a wide range of genres, similar to anime such as Excel Saga.

Much of the manga contains references to role-playing games and occasionally either other manga, or anything that begins with the word dragon. Ryūsuke Mita's favorite animal is the dragon. As a result, several dragons play an important role in the manga, most notably Mana and her father, Titan.

== Plot ==
Mink was born to a man who used to be a skilled swordsman and a female imperial red dragon. At age fifteen, she falls in love with a singer named Dick Saucer, but because he is also a dragonslayer, she has no choice but to get a potion that can change her into a pure human. She can only get the potion, however, if she can slay the most powerful Demon Lord in the land, Azetodeth, and go to his palace known as the Demon King's island. Not only does she have to reconstruct the Gourd of the Saints, an item that can seal Azetodeth, she also has to be aware of Princess Vina, her rival for Saucer's affections. Mink is aided by her friends Lufa, Pia, and a fairy mouse named Mappy on her quest.

After a number of adventures, mainly a conflict with a vampire and her four handmaidens and discovering Dick Saucer's past, Mink finally comes face to face with Azetodeth. She manages to seal the Demon Lord away with the Gourd of Saints, and although she gains the potion, she chooses to remain half-human, half-imperial red dragon forever. Instead of using the potion herself, she gives the potion to her friend Lufa, who had been turned into a toad by the Demon Lord's magic.

== Terminology ==
=== Locations ===
The Demon King's island
An island where Azetodeth and his three sons live. This island has tall rugged rocks and is surrounded by a wall that prevents anything that goes through unless it goes into the main entrance which is difficult to find or a gate guarded by a receptionist named Suzuki who is beaten by Mink and runs off. The island is first seen at the end of Chapter 13. After making several more cameos, Mink finally gets on the island in Chapter 50. There is also a castle which is completely destroyed by Azetodeth in Chapter 64.
Village of the Red Lightning
The village where Mink and her family and friends live. It is shown in the beginning having a river flowing through it and mountains surrounding it, and is shown again in the credits.

=== Items ===
The Gourd of the Saints
The Gourd of the Saints is a bottle that took 200 years for Mink's dragon great-grandfather to make. It was broken into three pieces which transformed into three holy artifacts 2000 years ago. The artifacts were Parza's holy grail (a goblet), Lorelo's Ball (a black ball that "provides super-screw") and Gill's crown. The Gourd of the Saints is extremely important as it is the only one that can seal Azetodeth away.

=== The three holy artifacts ===
There are three sacred treasures required to resurrect the gourd known as the three holy artifacts (Sango no Jingi in the Japanese version). They are loosely based on the Imperial Regalia of Japan. Parza's holy grail represents the mirror of wisdom, Lorelo's ball represents the Jewel of Benevolence and Gil's crown represents the sword of valor, but only Lorelo's ball and the jewel of benevolence correspond to each other in the story.

== Media ==
=== Manga ===
Dragon Half was released in two versions. The first was as seven standard tankōbon, and the second was a wideban release comprising three volumes which included extra galleries and interviews with Mita not found in the original releases. The manga consists of 65 chapters. After Dragon Half ended, Ryūsuke Mita created a sequel one-shot called Dragon Half Z about Mink's seven-year-old daughter Pink. The manga has been licensed in North America by Seven Seas Entertainment.

=== Anime and video game ===
A 2-episode OVA series adaptation was animated by Production I.G in 1993. It was written and directed by Shin'ya Sadamitsu, with character designs by Masahiro Koyama and music by Kōhei Tanaka. The first OVA, Dragon Half: Mink's Journey (ドラゴンハーフ～ミンク旅立ち, Doragon Hāfu: Minku Tabidachi), was released on March 26, 1993. The second, Dragon Half (Final): The Brutal Killer Martial Arts Tournament (ドラゴンハーフ(後編)～凶殺武闘大会, Doragon Hāfu: Kyōsatsu Butō Taikai), was released two months later on May 28.

The OVA series is based on sections of the first two volumes. There were originally going to be 4 OVA episodes but there was not enough interest so only two episodes were produced. The ending theme song, My Omelette, was written to the music of Beethoven (Symphony No. 7, 4th movement) and sung by Kotono Mitsuishi while in character.

The OVA has also inspired a game for the PC Engine, also called Dragon Half, released by Microcabin of Xak series fame. The game is an RPG and roughly follows the plot of the OVA. The OVA's voice actors returned to voice roles in the game. A PC-98 and FM-Towns versions were developed by Micro Cabin Corp.

The game was released on September 30, 1994.
