= Music of Neon Genesis Evangelion =

Anime series discography

Neon Genesis Evangelion discography
- Studio albums: 5
- Soundtrack albums: 12
- Live albums: 2
- Compilation albums: 4
- Singles: 15

Neon Genesis Evangelion (Japanese: 新世紀エヴァンゲリオン, Hepburn: Shinseiki Evangerion) is a 1995 anime series directed by Hideaki Anno. Shiro Sagisu composed the soundtracks for it and its sequels, remakes and spinoffs. In addition to Sagisu's compositions, the soundtracks include pieces by Masami Okui, Kotono Mitsuishi and a wide repertoire of classical music, including pieces by Ludwig van Beethoven, Johann Sebastian Bach, Giuseppe Verdi, and other composers. Under the direction of Toshimichi Ōtsuki, a representative of King Records and one of the producers of the series, "A Cruel Angel's Thesis" was composed as the series' opening theme song. The series used "Fly Me to the Moon", originally written by Bart Howard, as the closing theme song. Different versions of the song were recorded by British singer Claire Littley, Yoko Takahashi and the anime's main female voice actors, Megumi Hayashibara, Kotono Mitsuishi and Yuko Miyamura.

The anime soundtrack was collected in three main albums, released in 1995 and 1996. These were followed by several studio albums, collections and remixes. Sagisu also composed the soundtracks for the Rebuild of Evangelion tetralogy—a remake of the original series—and several derivative video games. Critics have compared several pieces to Beatles songs and soundtracks from earlier anime, such as Mobile Suit Gundam and Space Battleship Yamato. Sagisu's work has been well received by critics and audiences alike; several albums and singles from the soundtrack have been certified gold or platinum in Japan, reaching the top of the national charts. According to SciFi Japan, albums dedicated to Evangelion have sold a total of nine million copies.

== Production ==
=== Writing and inspiration ===
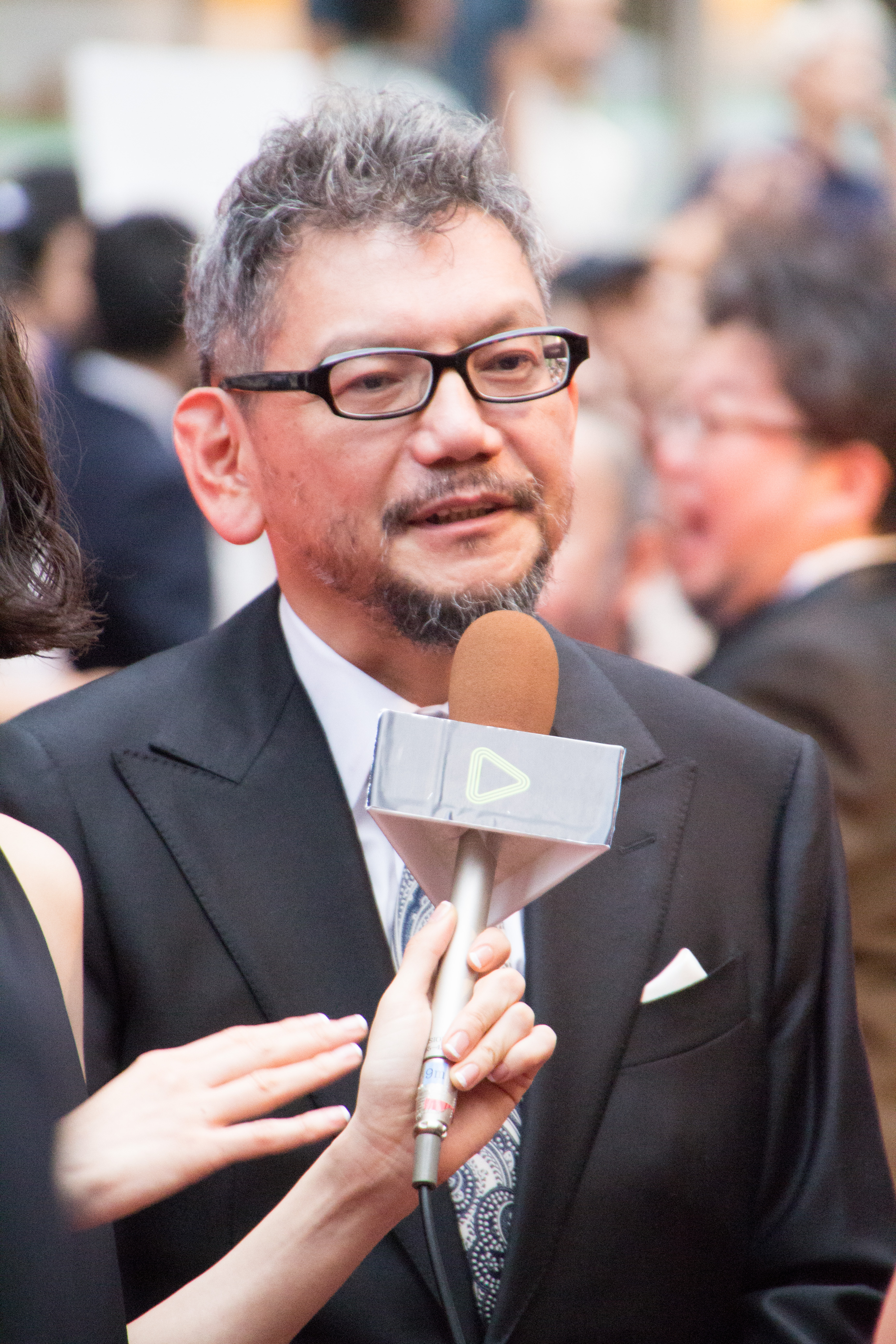
Hideaki Anno, Neon Genesis Evangelion director

The original soundtrack of Neon Genesis Evangelion was composed by Shiro Sagisu and distributed by King Records, which was also directly involved in the conception and production of the series. The music was produced by the director and main scriptwriter of the series, Hideaki Anno, who gave several instructions to the composer and was personally responsible for choosing the titles of the pieces. Toshimichi Ōtsuki, a representative of King Records, first approached Anno about making Evangelion and gave him the opportunity to launch the project, taking on the role of one of the series' producers. Ōtsuki gave Anno artistic freedom over the entire series' production, except for the series' opening theme song, "A Cruel Angel's Thesis".

Working on Anno's direction, Sagisu sought to capture a "retro" feel in the soundtrack and tie it to the psychological themes of the series. For example, to give the Eva's cockpit the feel of a mother's womb, Anno asked him to compose a melody that would accentuate a feeling of nostalgia. Sagisu and Anno also attempted to differentiate the soundtrack from the soundtracks of other mecha anime series. Most of the compositions were produced with sounds and methods typical of the 1970s, avoiding the use of synthesisers to give the tracks a nostalgic sound. Most of the tracks give prominence to brass instruments, while other tracks emphasize cello or piano. According to writer Masaki Miyakawa, the nostalgic touch of Sagisu's compositions was due to the production process of Japanese animated series of the time; the designs were often not finished until after the production of the soundtrack, so director Anno would have given Sagisu directions by referring to existing products. The first recording sessions were held at King Records studios from 12 March 1995.

Philip Brophy of Real Time compared Sagisu's soundtrack to the soundtrack of Thunderbirds, and the works of Steve Reich and Ken Ishii. Miyakawa compared "Angel Attack" and "Decisive Battle" to the compositions of Japanese special effects tokusatsu films, such as Godzilla; "Angel Attack", in particular, has been compared to the soundtrack of Ryūichi Sakamoto's The Last Emperor (1987) and the song "Kyūchi ni tatsu Gandamu" (窮地に立つガンダム; lit. 'Gundam in trouble') from Mobile Suit Gundam. According to Matthew Magnus Lundeen of Game Rant, the song "Angel Attack", which he likened to the theme of Jaws, was based on the compositions of old tokusatsu series, such as Ultraman or Kamen Rider, while "Decisive Battle" and "Angel Attack II" were compared to the music of James Bond films, specifically to the main theme of From Russia with Love (1963). Miyakawa compared "Rei I" to Sakamoto's compositions and the opening theme of Nausicaä of the Valley of the Wind (1984), "Background Music" to "My Sharona" by The Knack, "She said, 'Don't make others suffer for your personal hatred'" to the music of the Ventures, "Nerv" to the music of super sentai series and "Asuka Strikes!" to American country music and "Octopus's Garden" by the Beatles.

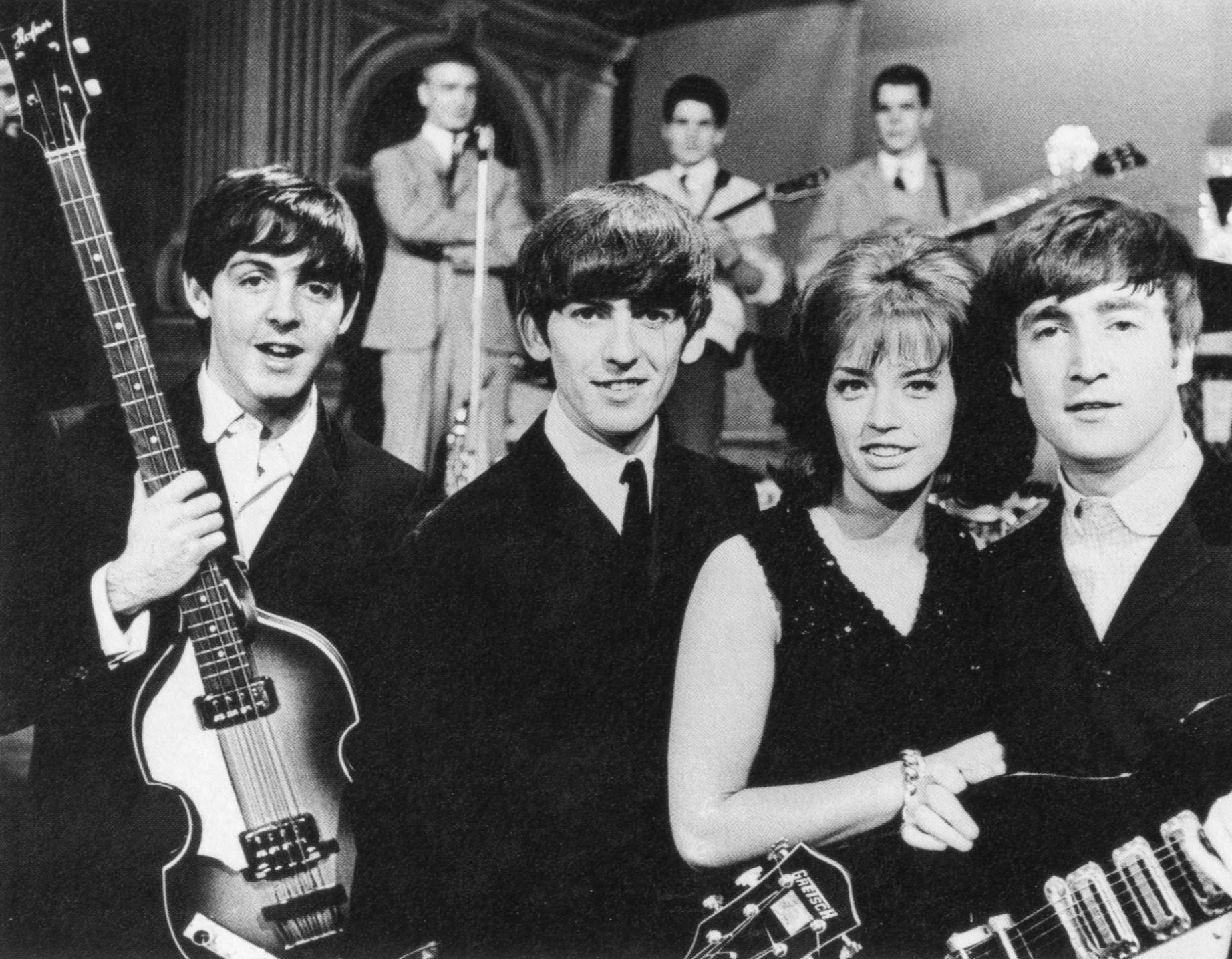
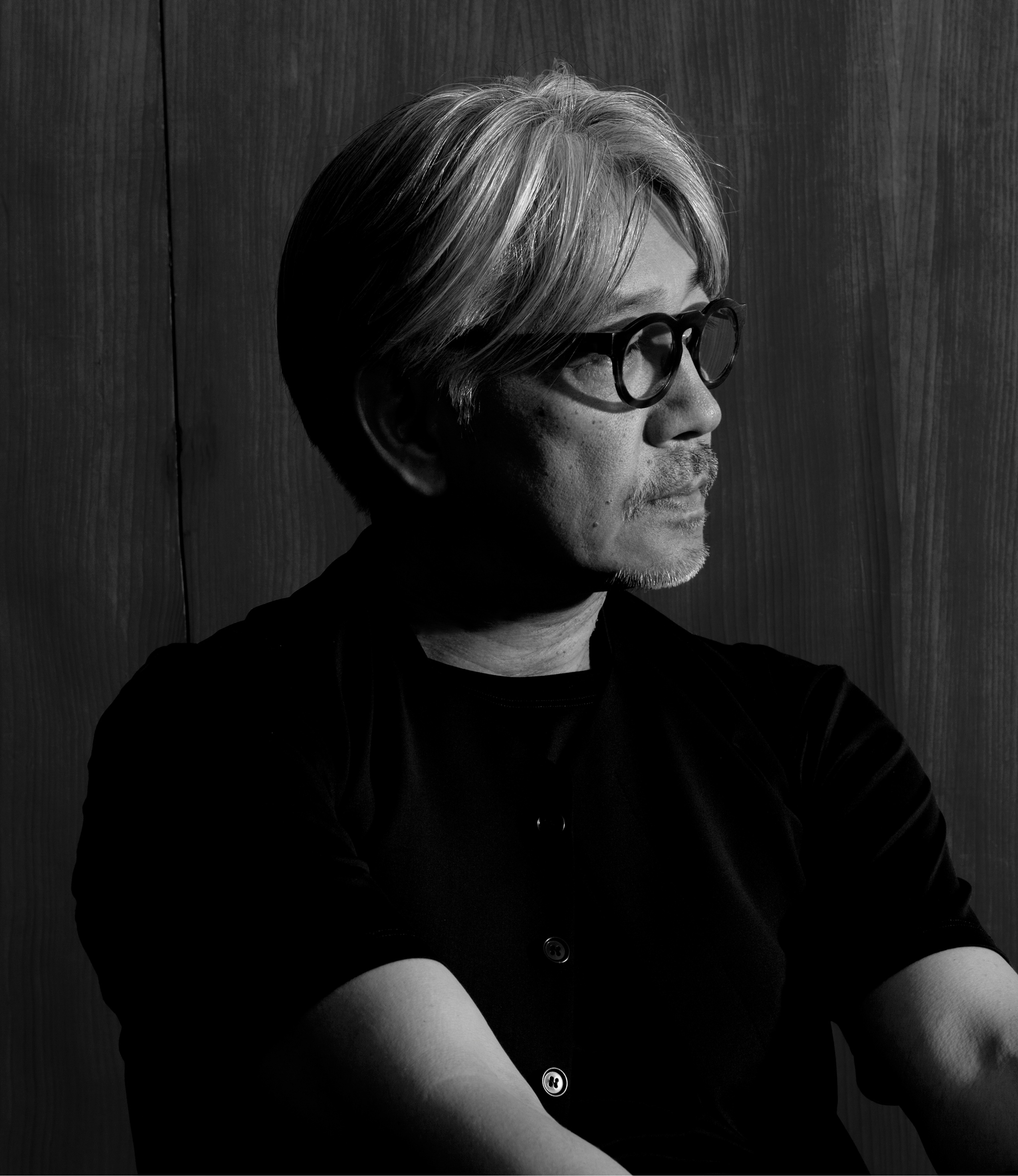
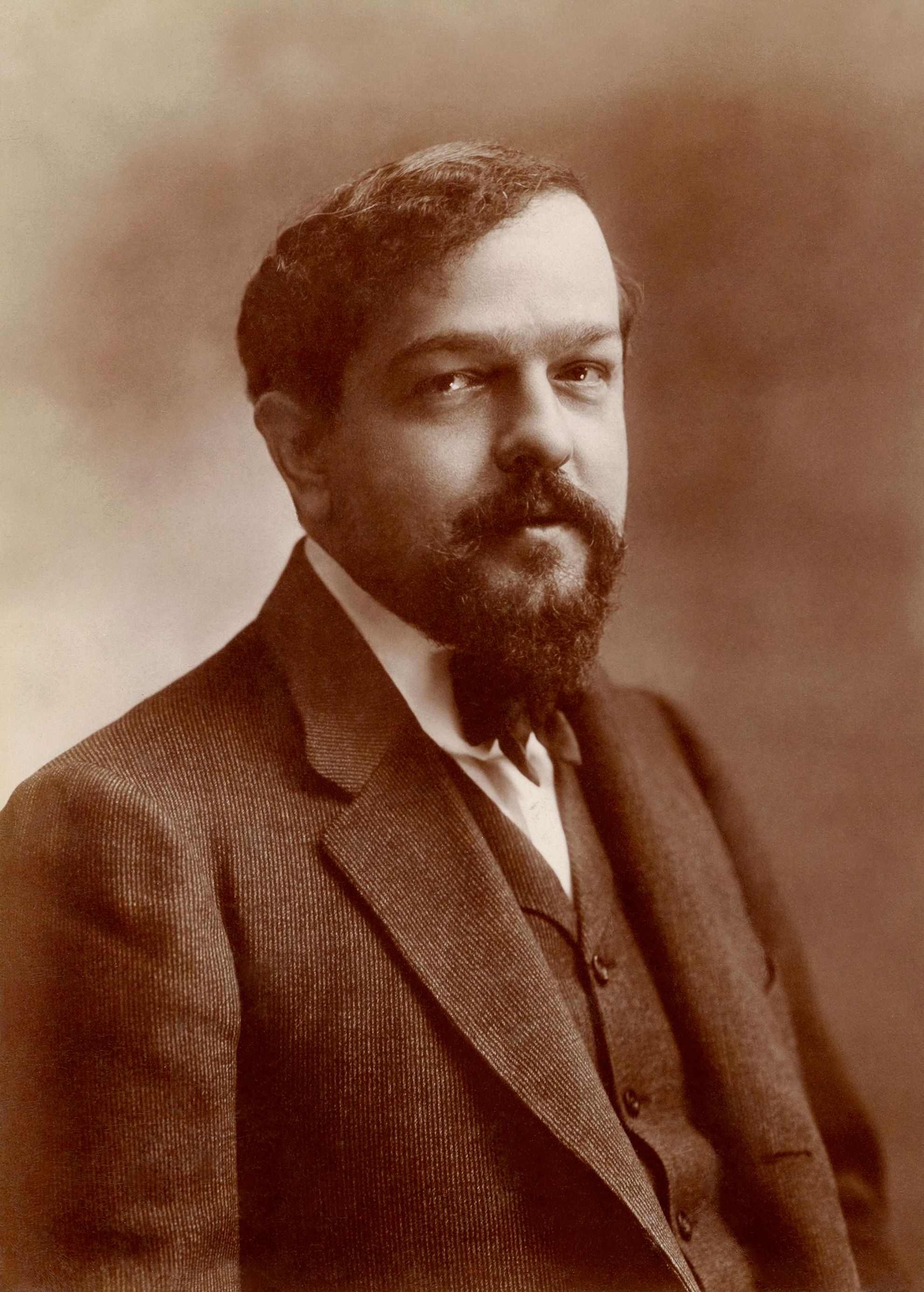
Critics compared Evangelion soundtrack to the music of the Beatles, Ryūichi Sakamoto and Claude Debussy

Miyakawa and several fans have also noted similarities between Sagisu's work and the music of the anime Space Battleship Yamato, with which it shares the instrumentation of strings, horns, rhythm section and percussion. They have compared "Eva-01" to the song "The Birth" and the theme of Battleship Andromeda, "Background Music II" to "The Original Space Battleship Yamato" track and the main theme of The Magnificent Seven (1960), and noted that "Background Music III" may have been inspired by Yamato song "Hero's Hill", heard in the film Farewell to Space Battleship Yamato (1978).

The music used in the twelfth episode during the confrontation against Sahaquiel was described by writer Dennis Redmond as "a Spanish-style aria reminiscent of Leone's Spaghetti Westerns", while "Eva-00" has been compared to the works of Bernard Herrmann. According to Heike Hoffer, the music reflects the psychology of the characters in the series; Misato's theme has a jazzy, laid-back sound, Asuka's has a Western sound, and Rei's has a Debussy-like harmonic piano.

The track "Borderline Case", used during the introspective scenes featuring Shinji, has been noted for its metaphysical tone, and ambient or minimalist influence. According to a file on the album Refrain of Evangelion, Misato's theme also has an unusual tune compared to the other soundtracks in the series; however, since Sagisu also participated in the composition of the music for the variety show Waratte iitomo!, "this type of music is also his cup of tea". The series' opening theme song, "A Cruel Angel's Thesis", has been described by Jack Doyle of The Mary Sue as "a baroque pop earworm". The original composition, characterised by sounds similar to music of the second half of the 1980s, has also been remixed into various genres, such as techno, jungle and traditional Japanese music.

=== Classical music ===
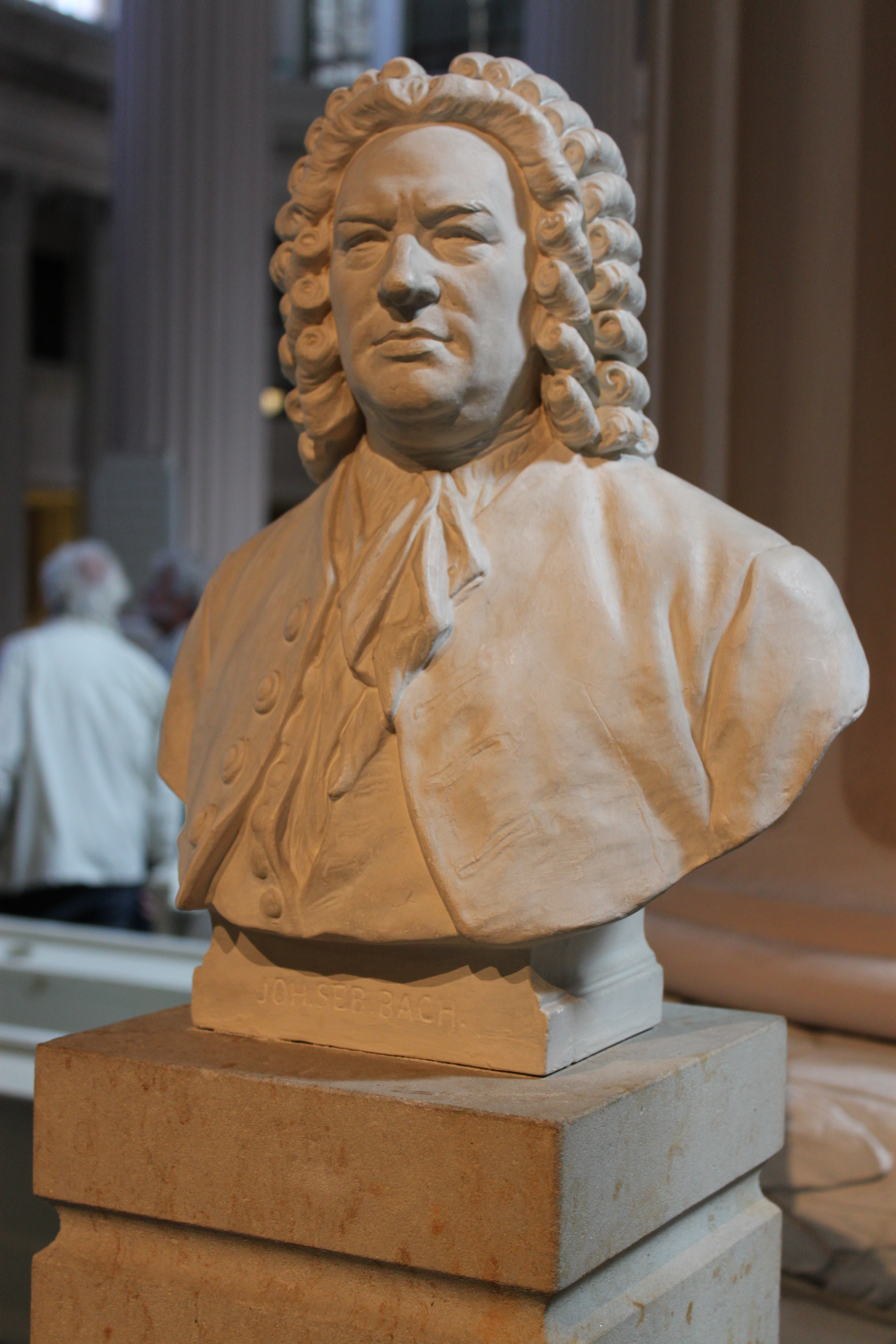
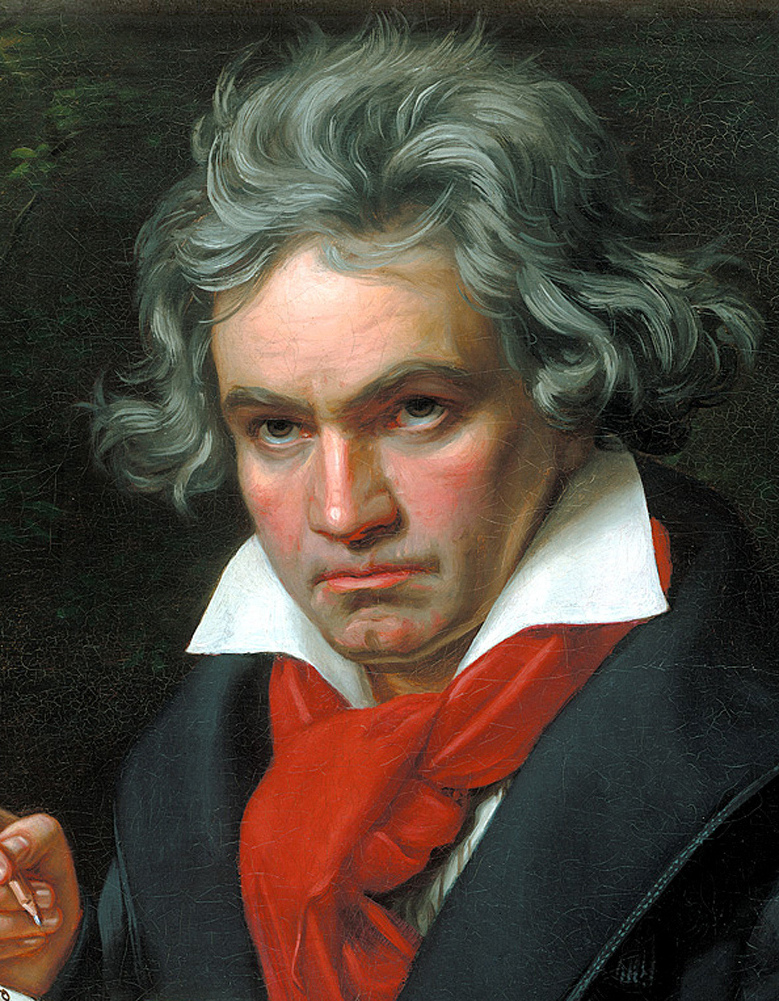
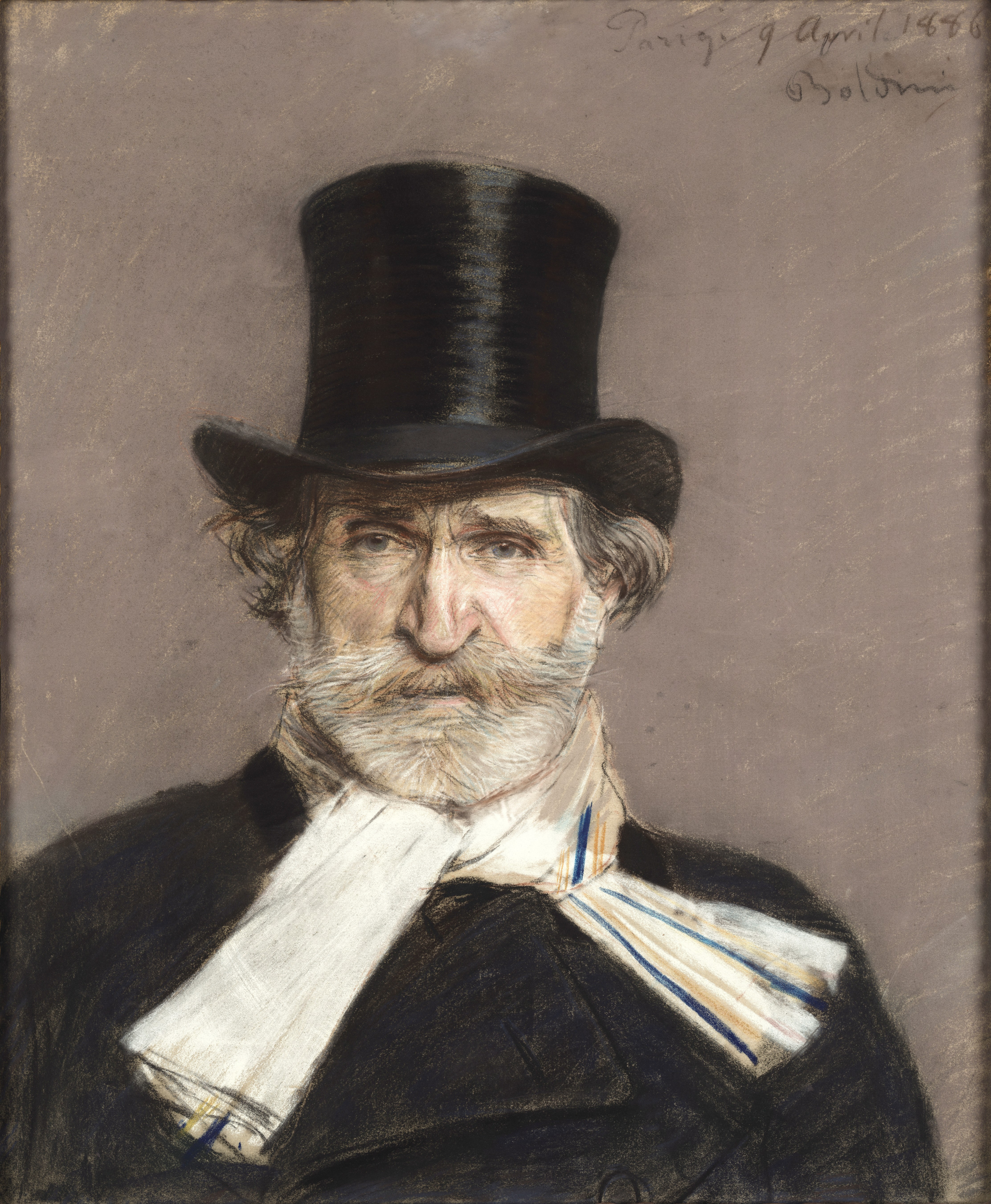
Staff used compositions of Johann Sebastian Bach, Georg Friedrich Händel, Ludwig van Beethoven and Giuseppe Verdi for the soundtrack

In addition to Sagisu's original compositions, the soundtrack also includes classical music, such as Johann Sebastian Bach's Suite for Cello Solo No.1 in G Major, Violin Partita No.3, Suite No. 3 in D Major and Herz und Mund und Tat und Leben, Johann Pachelbel's Canon, Georg Friedrich Händel's Messiah, Giuseppe Verdi's Requiem and Ludwig van Beethoven's Ode to Joy.

Hideaki Anno, himself a fan of classical music, initially requested that the Polovician Dances, from Aleksandr Borodin's opera Prince Igor, be used as the opening theme song for the series, but that request was rejected by TV Tokyo. Anno's use of classical music during violent scenes has been compared to Stanley Kubrick's works. The Cello Suite, played by Shinji in the fifteenth episode of the series, was selected by screenwriter Akio Satsukawa, who is known for using classical music pieces, such as Manon Lescaut and Madama Butterfly, in his works.

Ode to Joy is used as the soundtrack for the series' twenty-fourth episode, and features lyrics with several parallels to the series' plot. The song was used to echo the theme of the episode and for the line "We enter intoxicated and quivering, O Heavenly One, into Thy temple". The piece was used in both the original series, in the scene in which Kaworu Nagisa attempts to break into the deepest part of Nerv Headquarters, as well as in the film Neon Genesis Evangelion: Death and Rebirth and in the third installment of the Rebuild of Evangelion saga. Haiku Hoffer has noted how Ode to Joy, unlike other pieces such as Bach's Cello Suite, is well known in Japan, as it is played during end-of-year concerts called Daiku; the fact that Kaworu hums the piece in front of Shinji, seen in Japan as a song to be sung as a group symbol of cooperation and a sense of community, would immediately suggest to the Japanese viewer how the two characters are destined to become friends over the course of the series. Also audible in the piece is the phrase "der Cherub steht vor Gott", "the cherub stands before God", which Hoffer associates with the fact that Kaworu stands before the Angel Lilith, a figure resembling a deity. Bach's Jesu, Joy of Man's Desiring has also been used in Rebuild promotional videos.

=== Other songs ===
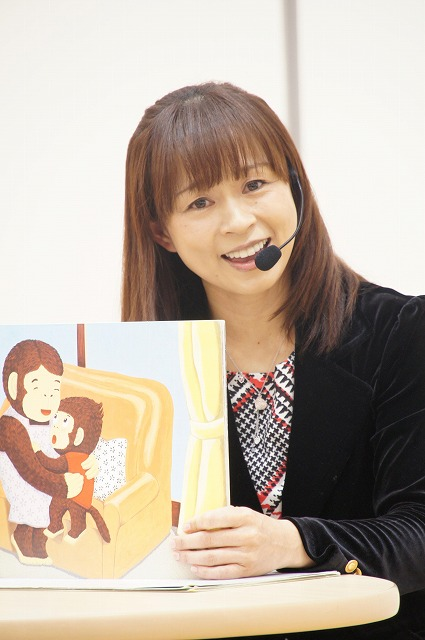
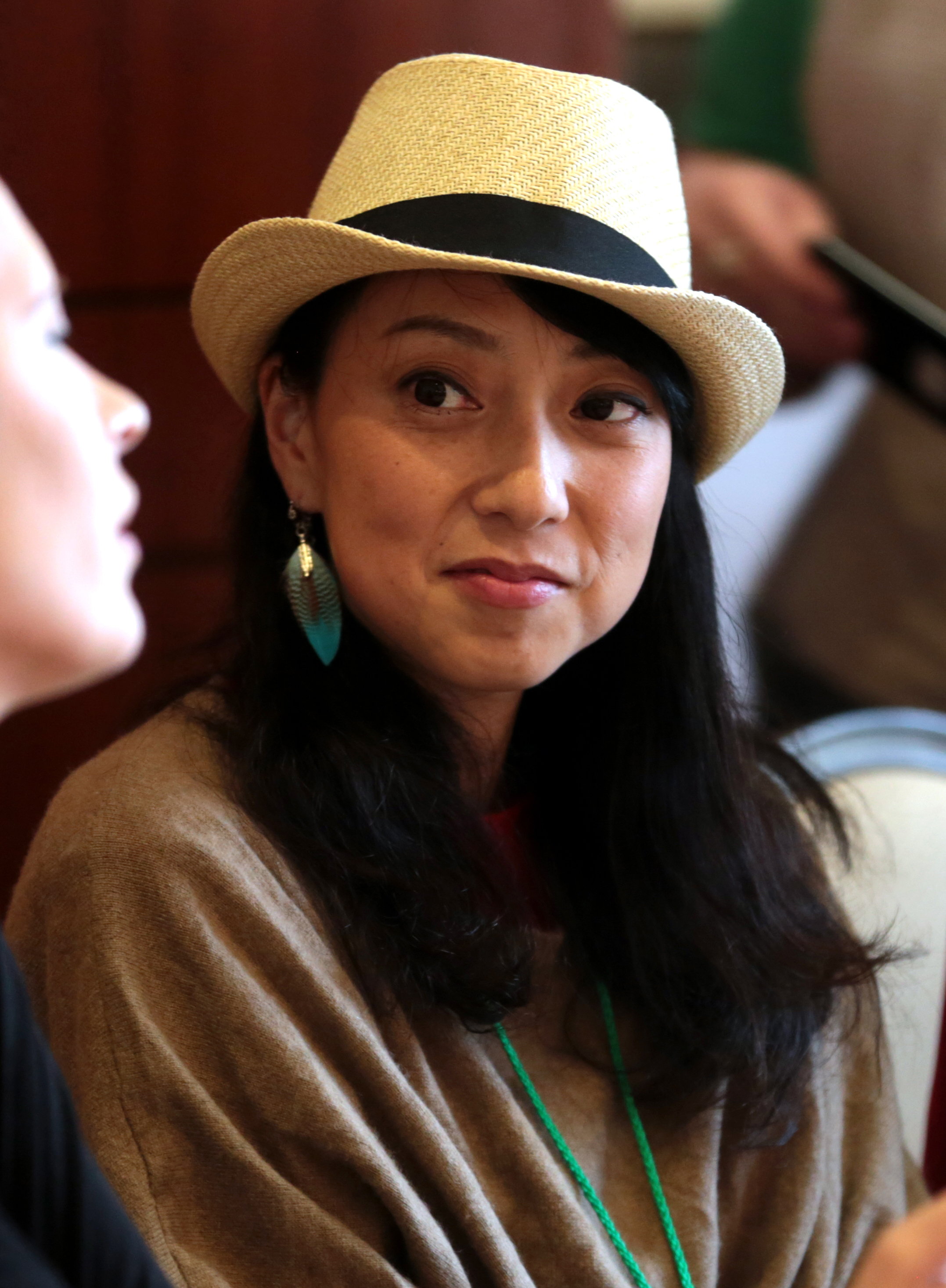
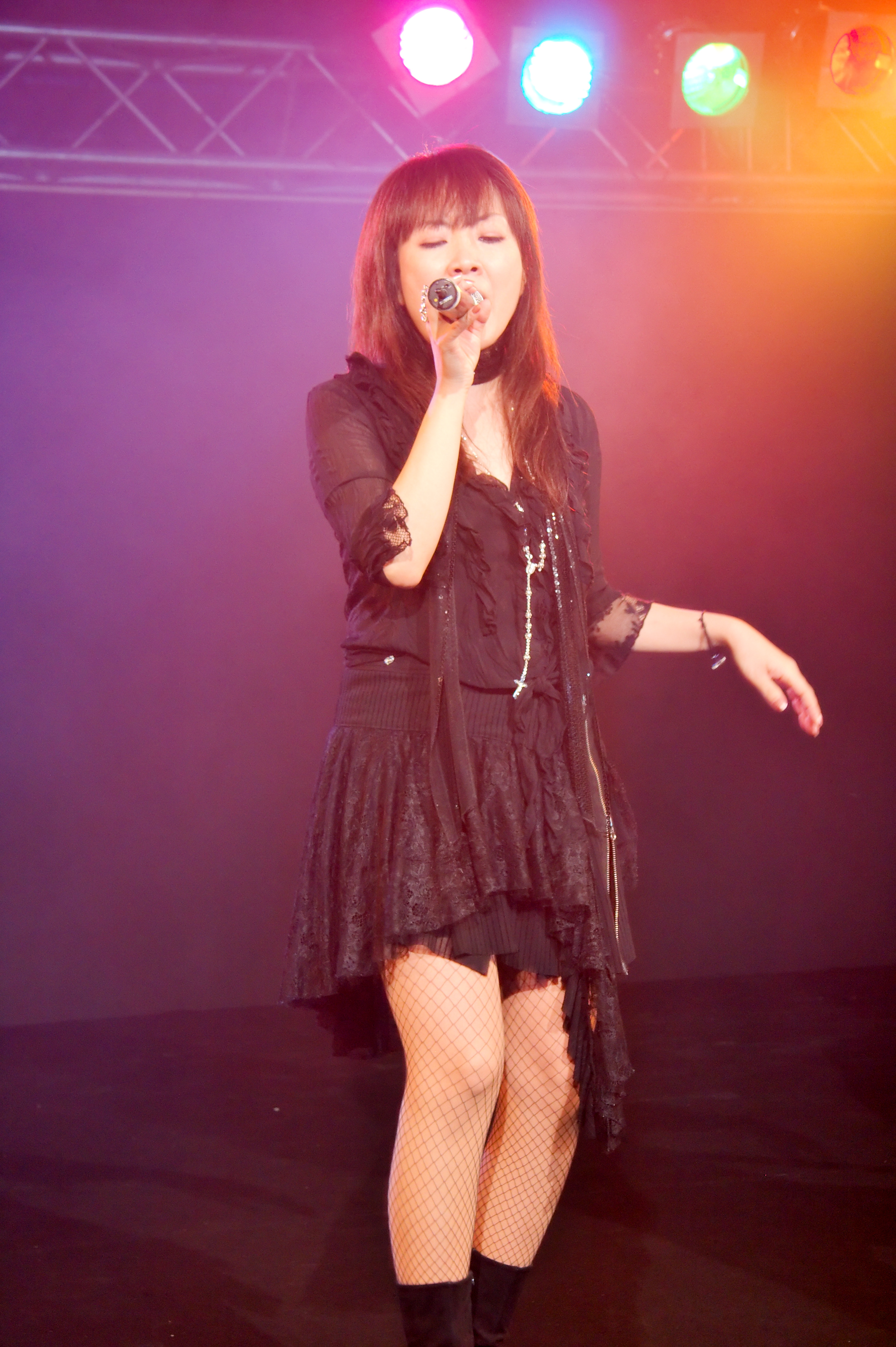
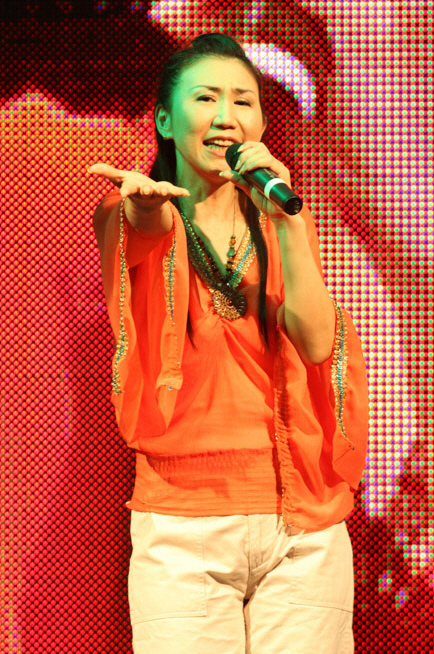
Junko Iwao and Yūko Miyamura sang a song for the fifteenth episode. Staff also used music by Masami Okui, as well as the variations of "Fly Me to the Moon" covered by Yoko Takahashi.

The soundtrack also features contemporary songs that were not composed for the series. Tracks by Kotono Mitsuishi and Masami Okui are used in several scenes of the series, usually as background music or on Shinji's Digital Audio Tape player. The soundtrack features songs by Mitsuishi, Misato Katsuragi's original voice actress, including "You are the only one", "Aoi legend", "Toi sora no yakusoku" (遠い空の約束; lit. 'The promise of the distant sky') and "Fall in a Star", all from Lilia 〜from Ys〜, a 1992 album dedicated to the music of the Ys video game series. Mitsuishi's songs were also reused in Evangelion: 1.0 You Are (Not) Alone and later released in the related soundtrack albums.

Okui's songs "Bay side love story -from Tokyo-", "Face", "Ryōte-ippai no yume" (両手いっぱいの夢; lit. 'Hands full of dreams') and "Fushigina yoru"不思議な夜 (Mysterious nights), rom Gyuu, the singer's first album, were used. The fifteenth episode also features Tentō mushi no samba (てんとう𰙫のサンバ; lit. 'The ladybird's samba'), a 1973 song popular at Japanese weddings, recorded for the series during dubbing by Junko Iwao, Miki Nagasawa, Yuko Miyamura and Megumi Ogata.

==== "Fly Me to the Moon" ====
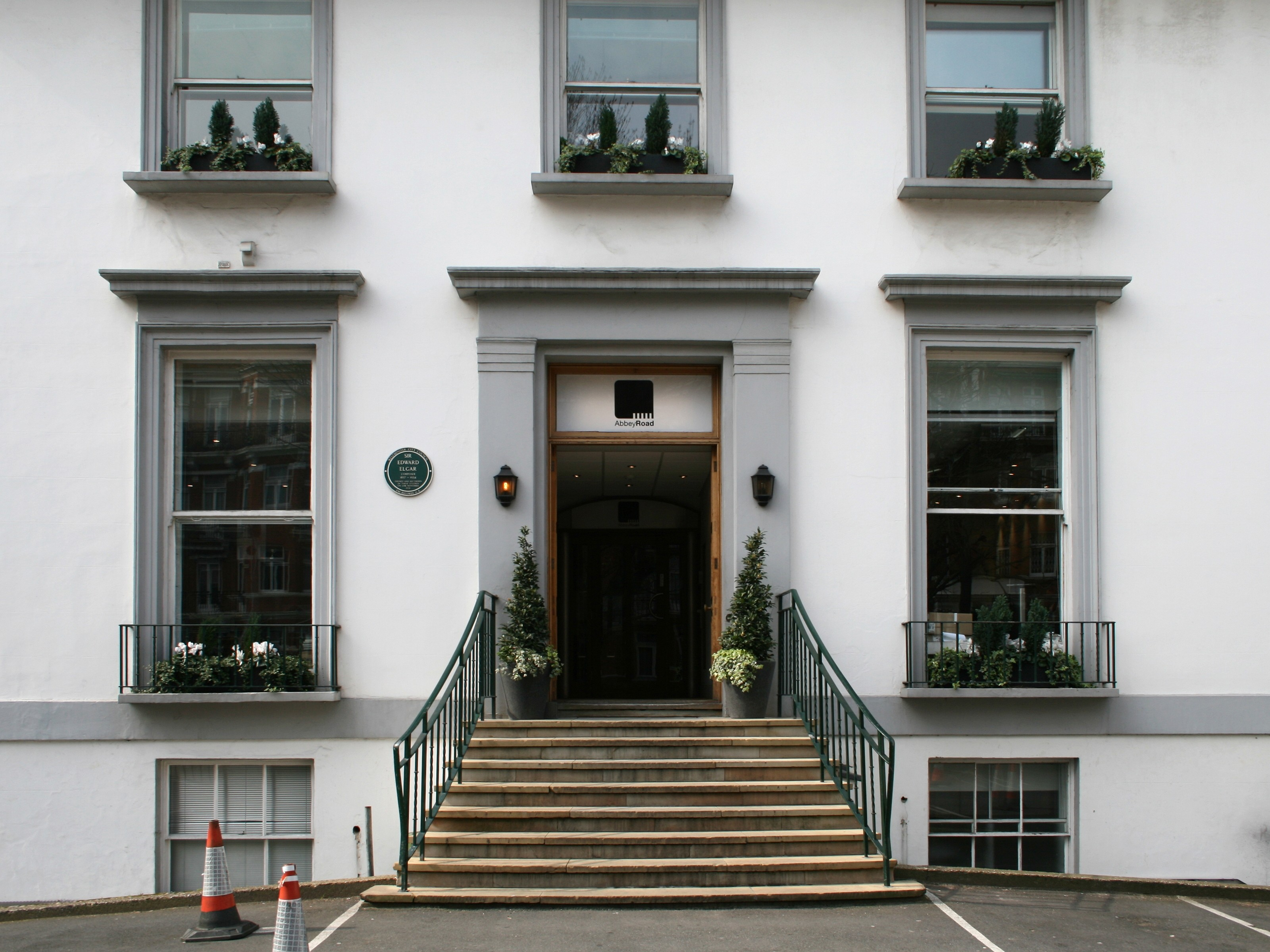
Abbey Road Studios in London

For the closing theme song, staff decided to use an existing song, "Fly Me to the Moon" by Bart Howard, with original arrangement and interpretation. The animations for the end theme song were designed and created by Masayuki, one of the assistant directors of the series. The song was later included in the various soundtrack albums and reused for some promotional videos of the feature films Evangelion: 1.0 You Are (Not) Alone and Evangelion: 2.0 You Can (Not) Advance, the first and second chapters of the Rebuild. The song is performed by British singer Claire Littley and the anime's female voice actors, Megumi Hayashibara, Kotono Mitsuishi and Yuko Miyamura, in different versions from episode to episode. In one of the initial proposals, it was instead the opening theme song of the series that would change from episode to episode, imitating the opening song of Silver kamen. The main version, arranged by Toshiyuki Omori and sung by Claire, was recorded at Abbey Road Studios in London.

In 2003, Gainax released a new edition of the series called Renewal, including a bonus disc containing various extras. A remastered version of "Fly Me to the Moon," without credits, was also added to the bonus disc. This extra was later added to subsequent Japanese editions, such as the Blu-ray box set of the series released in 2015. New versions of the piece were also added to the Renewal edition. The various versions of "Fly Me to the Moon" are:

| Episode | | Vocal | | Version | |
| Episode | | Original | Renewal | Original | Renewal |
|---|---|---|---|---|---|
| #1 | | Claire Littley | | Normal | |
| #2 | | Claire Littley | | Normal | Normal (without Strings) |
| #3 | | Claire Littley | Yoko Takahashi | Normal | |
| #4 | | Claire Littley | Yoko Takahashi | Normal | Normal (without strings) |
| #5 | | Megumi Hayashibara | | Rei #5 | |
| #6 | | Megumi Hayashibara | | Rei #6 | |
| #7 | | Yoko Takahashi | | 4 Beat | |
| #8 | | Aya | | Bossa Techno | |
| #9 | | Yoko Takahashi | Yūko Miyamura | Acid Bossa | Bossa Techno |
| #10 | | Yoko Takahashi | Yūko Miyamura | Normal | Normal Orchestra (with chorus) |
| #11 | | Claire Littley | Kotono Mitsuishi, Megumi Hayashibara and Yūko Miyamura | Normal | Normal Orchestra (#1) |
| #12 | | Yoko Takahashi | Kotono Mitsuishi | 4 Beat | Normal Orchestra (with chorus) |
| #13 | | Yoko Takahashi | | Acid Bossa | |
| #14 | | Yoko Takahashi | Megumi Hayashibara | Normal | Normal Orchestra (solo) |
| #15 | | Off Vocal | Kotono Mitsuishi | 4 Beat | |
| #16 | | Off Vocal | Kotono Mitsuishi, Megumi Hayashibara and Yūko Miyamura | Normal | Normal Orchestra (Interlude Start ~ #1 Second Half) |
| #17 | | Aki | | Jungle | |
| #18 | | Claire Littley | Off Vocal | Normal | B-4 guitar & piano |
| #19 | | Claire Littley | Kotono Mitsuishi, Megumi Hayashibara and Yūko Miyamura | Normal | Normal Orchestra (#2) |
| #20 | | (Off Vocal) | | B-22 A-Type | B-4 piano |
| #21 | On-Air | Yoko Takahashi | Off-Vocal | Normal | 4 Beat |
| #21 | Director's Cut (#21’) | (Off Vocal) | | 4 Beat (90 seconds) | |
| #22 | On-Air | Aya | | Bossa Techno | |
| #22 | Director's Cut (#22’) | (Off Vocal) | | Bossa Techno (80 seconds) | |
| #23 | On-Air | Megumi Hayashibara | | Rei #23 | |
| #23 | Director's Cut (#23’) | Megumi Hayashibara | | Rei #23 (90 seconds) | |
| #24 | On-Air | (Off Vocal) | | Normal | |
| #24 | Director's Cut (#24’) | (Off Vocal) | | Normal (90 seconds) | |
| #25 | | Megumi Hayashibara | | Rei #25 | |
| #26 | | Megumi Hayashibara | | Rei #26 | |

== Theme songs ==
=== "A Cruel Angel's Thesis" ===
"A Cruel Angel's Thesis" (残酷な天使のテーゼ, Zankoku na Tenshi no Tēze; "Zankoku na Tenshi no These" in Japan), performed by Yoko Takahashi, is the theme song used in the anime. Two instrumental versions of the song were played in the finale, "Take care of yourself". Those versions were named "The Heady Feeling of Freedom" and "Good, or Don't Be", and scored for violin, piano and guitar. The single was released on 25 October 1995. It reached a peak rank 17 in the Oricon album database, in which it has appeared 61 times.

=== "Soul's Refrain" ===
"Tamashii no Refrain" (魂のルフラン, Tamashī no Rufuran; "Soul's Refrain") was the theme song used for the first film in the Neon Genesis Evangelion franchise, Evangelion: Death and Rebirth. It was performed by Yoko Takahashi and released as a single on 21 February 1997. It ranked third on the Oricon charts, selling more than 800 thousand copies.

=== "Thanatos -If I Can't Be Yours-" ===
"Thanatos -If I Can't Be Yours-" is a song composed for The End of Evangelion and used as the end credits music. The single, with English lyrics sung by the duo Loren&Mash, was released on 1 August 1997. It reached number two on the Oricon charts, sold 600 thousand copies and was certified platinum. According to the book Neon Genesis Evangelion: The Unofficial Guide, written by Kazuhisa Fujie and Martin Foster, the song's violent and pessimistic lyrics may refer to the psychoanalytic concept of Thanatos, the destructive death drive postulated by Sigmund Freud. Another song from the original series was also titled "Thanatos" for the same reason.

=== "Komm, süsser Tod" ===
"Komm, süsser Tod" (German, also rendered as "Komm, süßer Tod"; [kɔm ˈzyːsɐ toːt]; Come, Sweet Death in English; 甘き死よ、来たれ in Japanese) is a song composed for The End of Evangelion. For the track, performed by Arianne, Anno wrote Japanese lyrics that were later translated into English by Mike Wyzgowski. The song is homonymous to a sacred song by Bach (BWV 478) and has been compared to "Hey Jude" by the Beatles.

=== "Beautiful World" ===
"Beautiful World" was released on 29 August 2007. The track was performed by Utada Hikaru and used as the end credits song for the first two installments of Rebuild of Evangelion. The song reached number two on Oricon's weekly charts, and received platinum certification for selling 250,000 physical copies and diamond certification for one million certified digital sales.

=== "Sakura Nagashi" ===
"Sakura Nagashi" (桜流し; lit. 'Flowing Cherry Blossoms/Cherry Blossoms Sinking') was composed for Evangelion 3.0 and performed by Utada Hikaru. It was released as a single on 17 November 2012 and was commercially successful, ranking number two on the Billboard Japan Hot 100.

=== "The Final Decision" ===
"0902 The Final Decision....alterna orchestra" is a digital single released by King Records on 24 April 2019 on various platforms, including iTunes. The single was released to advertise concerts for Evangelion Wind Symphony, scheduled for May 2019 in several Japanese cities.

| No. | Title | Music | Length |
|---|---|---|---|
| 1. | "0902 The Final Decision....alterna orchestra" | Shirō Sagisu | 3:49 |

=== "One Last Kiss" ===
"One Last Kiss" was composed for the last installment of the Rebuild saga and sung by Utada Hikaru. The song, released on 9 March 2021 in the United States and in Japan on 10 March, reached number two on the Oricon charts and number 37 on the Billboard United States Album Sales chart.

=== "What if?" ===
"Shiro Sagisu <<what if?>> Yoko Takahashi ver." (鷺巣詩郎 what if? 高橋洋子ver.?, Sagisu shirō what if? Takahashi Yōko ver.) was released as a single on 31 August 2021 alongside the release of Shin Evangelion on Amazon Prime Video. Shiro Sagisu composed and arranged the song, which was sung by Yoko Takahashi with Gina Foster and Derk Green as backing vocalists. Mike Wyzgowski wrote the lyrics. "What if?" was released as both a regular edition and a special high-resolution edition, and was made available on Apple Music, Amazon Music, iTunes Store, Recochoku, mora and e-onkyo. A sample of the song was released for a limited time on the official Evangelion Eva-Extra app. Another version called "memorial vocal" was also released on the Shin soundtrack. CD Journal wrote that: "The chemistry between Yoko Takahashi's mysterious and poignant voice and the song's music is a delight to the ears".

Track listing: Shiro Sagisu <<what if?>> Yoko Takahashi ver.
| No. | Title | Lyrics | Music | Vocals | Length |
|---|---|---|---|---|---|
| 1. | Untitled | Mike Wyzgowski | Shirō Sagisu | Yōko Takahashi | 5:42 |

== Soundtrack albums ==
=== Neon Genesis Evangelion ===
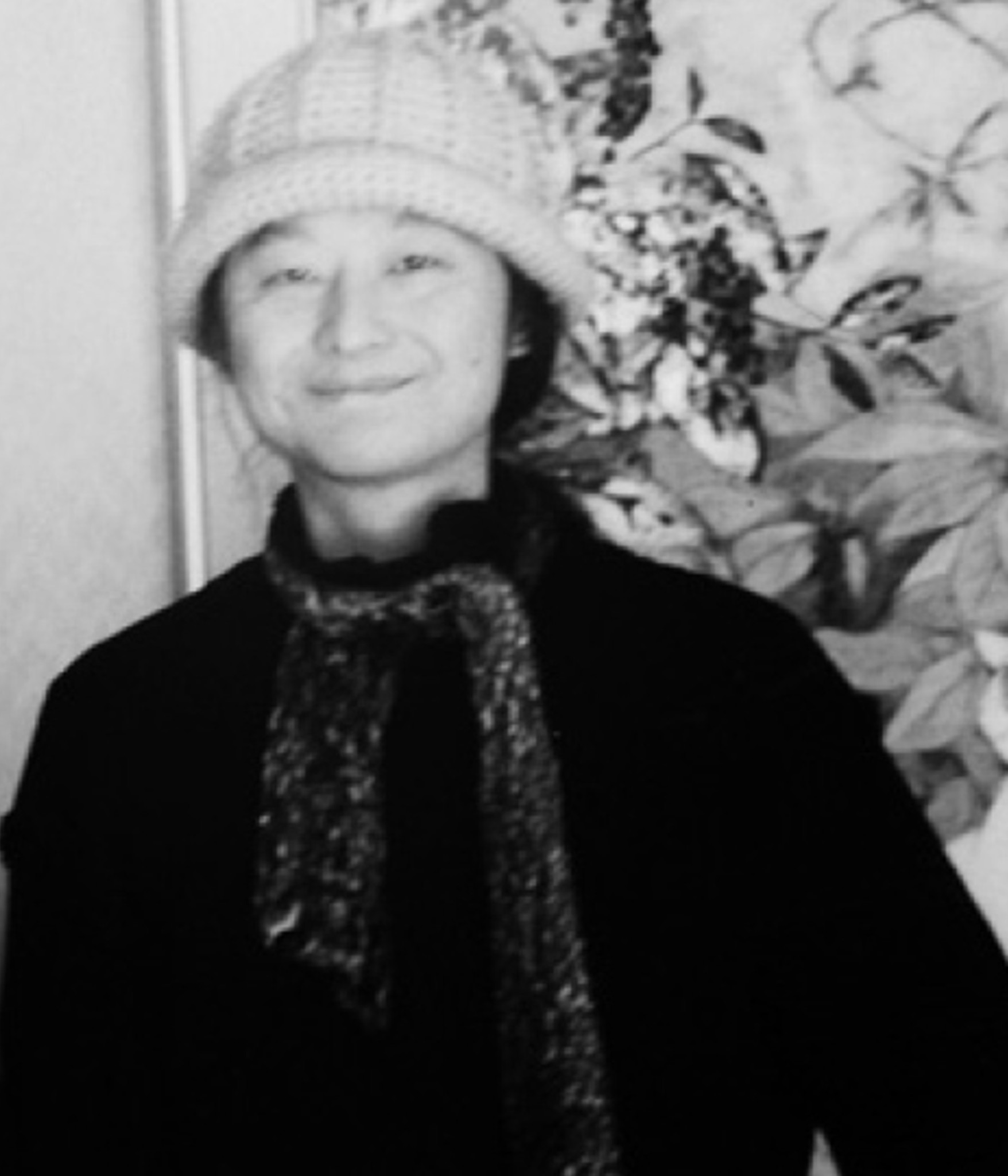
Composer Shiro Sagisu

Neon Genesis Evangelion, known as Neon Genesis Evangelion I, was the first album in the series by order of release, produced by Anno and distributed by King Records' Starchild label on 6 December 1995. Instead of naming the album after the Japanese name of the series, Toshimichi Ōtsuki of King Records chose the international title of the series, Neon Genesis. The album includes the most frequently used songs and main characters' themes. The album also includes a version of the opening theme song called "Director's Edit. Version", on which Anno made changes to the chorus and restored the guitar interlude.

The album had a positive commercial response, reaching number 12 on the Oricon album charts and remaining on the charts for 22 weeks. King Records re-released Neon Genesis Evangelion I in DVD-Audio on 21 December 2004 and a remastered version of the album called "2013 HR Remaster Ver." on 18 December 2013. A vinyl pressing of the album was also released on 9 September 2015. For the new release, Chris Bellman of Bernie Grundman Mastering remastered the original tracks in Los Angeles.

Outside of Japan, Geneon Entertainment released the album in January 2004 in an edition including all of the original tracks. Jonathan Mays of Anime News Network positively reviewed the album, saying: "Sagisu's themes are instantly memorable, making full use of a small chamber orchestra to make intensely personal music, a perfect match for Hideki Anno's soul-searching anime series." Lisani and Phile praised the "2013 HR Remaster Ver." edition, particularly with regard to the rendering and improved sound clarity. Sagisu received the Best Musician award at the 1997 Animation Kobe for the soundtrack.

All music is composed by Shirō Sagisu unless specified.

Track listing: Neon Genesis Evangelion
| No. | Title | Lyrics | Music | Vocals | Length |
|---|---|---|---|---|---|
| 1. | "A Cruel Angel's Thesis (Director's Edit Version)" (残酷な天使のテーゼ Zankoku na Tenshi no Tēze) | Neko Oikawa | Hidetoshi Satō | Yoko Takahashi | 4:02 |
| 2. | "Fly Me to the Moon" | Bart Howard | Howard | Claire Littley | 4:31 |
| 3. | "Angel Attack" (E-6) | | | | 2:29 |
| 4. | "Rei I" (A-1) | | | | 2:57 |
| 5. | "Hedgehog's Dilemma" (B-1) | | | | 2:45 |
| 6. | "Barefoot in the Park" (C-2) | | | | 2:34 |
| 7. | "Ritsuko" (C-5) | | | | 3:01 |
| 8. | "Misato" (B-16) | | | | 1:31 |
| 9. | "Asuka Strikes!" (B-17) | | | | 2:24 |
| 10. | "NERV" (A-3) | | | | 1:57 |
| 11. | "Tokyo-3" (C-7) | | | | 2:23 |
| 12. | "I. Shinji" (A-6) | | | | 2:00 |
| 13. | "Eva-01" (E-3) | | | | 2:46 |
| 14. | "A Step Forward Into Terror" (E-9) | | | | 1:56 |
| 15. | "Eva-02" (E-4) | | | | 1:57 |
| 16. | "Decisive Battle" (E-1) | | | | 2:22 |
| 17. | "Eva-00" (E-5) | | | | 1:49 |
| 18. | "The Beast" (E-5 Fast tempo) | | | | 1:38 |
| 19. | "Marking Time, Waiting for Death" (E-7) | | | | 2:42 |
| 20. | "Rei II" (B-20) | | | | 2:54 |
| 21. | "Fly Me to the Moon" (B-4) | | Howard | | 2:57 |
| 22. | "Next Episode Preview (次回予告, Jikai Yokoku)" (F-2 30-Second Version) | | | | 0:31 |
| 23. | "Fly Me to the Moon (Yoko Takahashi Acid Bossa Version)" | Howard | Howard | Takahashi | 3:49 |
| Total length: | | | | | 57:55 |

=== Neon Genesis Evangelion II ===
Neon Genesis Evangelion II was released by Starchild on 16 February 1996, and re-released in a second edition on 22 December 2004. The album entered Billboard charts; it remained on the national Oricon charts for 15 weeks, reaching fourth place. An image of Rei Ayanami drawn by series character designer Yoshiyuki Sadamoto was used for the album cover; Sadamoto was inspired by a version of "Fly Me to the Moon" sung by Megumi Hayashibara, the character's Japanese voice actress. On 18 December 2013, a remastered edition of the album called "2013 HR Remaster Ver" was released; the tracks were remastered at Bernie Grundman Studios in Hollywood under the supervision of Sagisu.

Two versions of Hayashibara's "Fly Me to the Moon", from the fifth and sixth episodes, were included on the album. Only the chorus of the song had been recorded, at short notice, for the TV broadcast, and were released after fan requests.

Outside Japan, the album was released in the US by Geneon in March 2004. Jonathan Mays of Anime News Network positively reviewed Neon Genesis Evangelion II; Mays particularly praised "Both of You, Dance Like You Want to Win!" because of its "simple, humorous melody and solid instrumentation", calling it "the real gem" of the soundtrack. Orin Starchaser of Ex magazine described Neon Genesis Evangelion II as better than its predecessor and praised Takahashi's "Yokan" track. Starchaser criticized the album for including various versions of "Fly Me to the Moon"; the reviewer criticised the "Aya Bossa Techno" version in particular, which he called a "blemish on her record that really ought not be remembered".

All music is composed by Shirō Sagisu unless specified.

Track listing: Neon Genesis Evangelion II
| No. | Title | Lyrics | Music | Vocals | Length |
|---|---|---|---|---|---|
| 1. | "A Vision" | Neko Oikawa | Toshiyuki Ohmori | Yoko Takahashi | 4:53 |
| 2. | "A Cruel Angel's Thesis (TV Size Version)" | Oikawa | Hidetoshi Satō | Takahashi | 1:31 |
| 3. | "Borderline Case" (A-4) | | | | 2:19 |
| 4. | "A Crystalline Night Sky" (C-6) | | | | 2:19 |
| 5. | "Angel Attack II" (A-7) | | | | 1:59 |
| 6. | "Angel Attack III" (A-9) | | | | 2:23 |
| 7. | "Both of You, Dance Like You Want to Win!" (B-12) | | | | 1:50 |
| 8. | "Waking up in the morning" (C-4) | | | | 1:28 |
| 9. | "Background Music" (A-2) | | | | 1:55 |
| 10. | "A Moment When Tension Breaks" (B-21) | | | | 4:10 |
| 11. | "The Day Tokyo-3 Stood Still" (B-14) | | | | 1:40 |
| 12. | "Spending Time in Preparation" (E-1 Rhythm only) | | | | 2:21 |
| 13. | "She said, 'Don't make others suffer for your personal hatred.'" (A-15) | | | | 1:53 |
| 14. | "Magmadiver" (E-15) | | | | 2:23 |
| 15. | "Pleasure Principle" (E-8) | | | | 3:48 |
| 16. | "The Beast II" (E-16) | | | | 2:18 |
| 17. | "Thanatos" (E-13) | | | | 3:29 |
| 18. | "Rei III" (A-14) | | | | 3:42 |
| 19. | "When I Find Peace of Mind" (B-7) | | | | 3:32 |
| 20. | "Fly Me to the Moon (TV Size Version)" | Bart Howard | Howard | Claire Littley | 1:08 |
| 21. | "Fly Me to the Moon (Rei (#5) TV Size Remix Version)" | Howard | Howard | Megumi Hayashibara | 1:09 |
| 22. | "Fly Me to the Moon (Rei (#6) TV Size Remix Version)" | Howard | Howard | Hayashibara | 1:08 |
| 23. | "Next Episode Preview (次回予告, Jikai Yokoku)" (F-2 15-Second Version) | | | | 0:17 |
| 24. | "Fly Me to the Moon (Aya Bossa Techno Version)" | Howard | Howard | Aya | 3:49 |
| 25. | "Fly Me to the Moon (Aki Jungle version)" | Howard | Howard | Aki | 4:34 |
| Total length: | | | | | 61:58 |

=== Neon Genesis Evangelion III ===
The third album, Neon Genesis Evangelion III, was released in Japan on 22 May 1996. It was redistributed on DVD-Audio on 22 December 2004. As with the previous two albums, a remastered version called "2013 HR Remaster Ver." was released on 18 December 2013. The album was released in the United States on 3 August 2004 by Geneon Entertainment. The album's content focused on synthesizer tracks, used mainly in the second half of the series.

Neon Genesis Evangelion III was well received by the public. The album charted for 11 weeks on the Oricon charts, reaching number one, an achievement not achieved by an anime since Galaxy Express 999 seventeen years earlier. Orin Starchaser of Ex stated that he enjoyed the album's first 22 tracks, such as "The Heady Feeling of Freedom" and "Good, or Don't Be", but as with the previous album, he criticised its repetition and the flatness of the various versions of "Fly Me to the Moon". Jonathan Mays of Anime News Network also expressed a similar opinion. CD Journal, on the other hand, welcomed the 2013 remastered version of III and the previous two albums, stating: "The music is superb and can be listened to as a magnificent, sumptuous, delicate and romantic symphony."

All music is composed by Shirō Sagisu unless specified.

Track listing: Neon Genesis Evangelion III
| No. | Title | Lyrics | Music | Vocals | Length |
|---|---|---|---|---|---|
| 1. | "Happiness Is the Smell of Sin" | Neko Oikawa | Toshiyuki Ohmori | Yoko Takahashi | 4:36 |
| 2. | "Eternal Embrace" | Oikawa | Takahashi | Takahashi | 5:23 |
| 3. | "Normal Blood" (E-16 Fast tempo) | | | | 1:56 |
| 4. | "Harbinger of Tragedy" (E-5 Rhythm only/Fast tempo) | | | | 1:38 |
| 5. | "Childhood Memories, Shut Away" (F-3 Take2) | | | | 0:35 |
| 6. | "Those women longed for the touch of others' lips, and thus invited their kisses." (B-4 Strings and piano) | | Bart Howard | | 2:19 |
| 7. | "Background Music II" (A-16 Strings) | | | | 1:33 |
| 8. | "Background Music III" (B-3) | | | | 2:32 |
| 9. | "In the Depths of Human Hearts" (B-2) | | | | 2:22 |
| 10. | "Hostility Restrained" (A-13 C-Type) | | | | 1:37 |
| 11. | "Three of Me, One of Someone Else" (C-55 D-Type) | | | | 2:19 |
| 12. | "Crime of Innocence" (A-13 B-Type) | | | | 2:25 |
| 13. | "The Sorrow of Losing the Object of One's Dependence" (B-4 Piano/Lonely) | | Howard | | 1:31 |
| 14. | "Do You Love Me?" (A-4 Synth voice only) | | | | 2:20 |
| 15. | "Separation Anxiety" (A-13) | | | | 2:26 |
| 16. | "Introjection" (A-12) | | | | 2:25 |
| 17. | "Depression" (A-11) | | | | 2:34 |
| 18. | "Splitting of the Breast" (A-10 Synth voice only) | | | | 2:14 |
| 19. | "Infantile Dependence, Adult Dependency" (B-9) | | | | 3:00 |
| 20. | "Mother Is the First Other" (A-10) | | | | 2:24 |
| 21. | "The Heady Feeling of Freedom" (OP-1 Strings/Slow tempo) | | Hidetoshi Satō | | 1:48 |
| 22. | "Good, or Don't Be." (OP-1 D-Type) | | Satō | | 1:22 |
| 23. | "Fly Me to the Moon (Yoko Takahashi TV Size Version)" | Howard | Howard | Takahashi | 1:08 |
| 24. | "Fly Me to the Moon (4 Beat TV Size Version)" | Howard | Howard | Takahashi | 1:08 |
| 25. | "Fly Me to the Moon (Aya Bossa Techno TV Size Version)" | Howard | Howard | Aya | 1:07 |
| 26. | "Fly Me to the Moon (Yoko Takahashi Acid Bossa TV Size Version)" | Howard | Howard | Takahashi | 1:07 |
| 27. | "Fly Me to the Moon (4 Beat Off Vocal TV Size Version)" | | Howard | | 1:07 |
| 28. | "Fly Me to the Moon (Off Vocal TV Size Version)" | | Howard | | 1:07 |
| 29. | "Fly Me to the Moon (Aki Jungle TV Size Version)" | Howard | Howard | Aki | 1:07 |
| 30. | "Fly Me to the Moon (B-22A Type TV Size Version)" | | Howard | | 1:07 |
| 31. | "Fly Me to the Moon (Rei (#23) TV Size Version)" | Howard | Howard | Megumi Hayashibara | 1:09 |
| 32. | "Fly Me to the Moon (Rei (#25) TV Size Version)" | Howard | Howard | Hayashibara | 1:09 |
| 33. | "Fly Me to the Moon (Rei (#26) TV Size Version)" | Howard | Howard | Hayashibara | 1:09 |
| 34. | "Fly Me to the Moon (Aya London Beat Version)" | Howard | Howard | Aya | 8:15 |
| Total length: | | | | | 67:19 |

=== Neon Genesis Evangelion Addition ===
Halleluja Chorus, one of the tracks of Neon Genesis Evangelion Addition

Neon Genesis Evangelion Addition, the fourth album dedicated to the franchise, was released on 21 December 1996. Addition was released to commemorate the theatrical release of Neon Genesis Evangelion: Death and Rebirth. Both a regular edition and a limited special edition with a special Death and Rebirth ticket attached were put on sale. Both editions were made available for a limited period during the film's production. When the album was announced, Gainax gave it the working title of Ex. Initially only the limited edition was planned, but as many fans already had tickets for Death and Rebirth or lived in areas without cinemas open to the public, the regular edition was also released. Neon Genesis Evangelion Addition had good commercial success; the regular version managed placed five times in the Oricon charts, reaching fourth place, while the special edition stayed on for 29 weeks, reaching 18th place.

Addition featured an audiodrama entitled Shūkyoku no tsudzuki (終局の続き; lit. 'Continuation of the finale'). In the audiodrama, written and directed by Anno, the characters of Evangelion metanarratively break the fourth wall and discuss how to improve and continue the series. To commemorate the broadcast date of the first episode, the track was made available in 2019 on the official Eva-Extra app for a limited time. Kenneth Jin-ho Cho of Ex magazine praised the hilarity of the audiodrama and its use of classical music, but found the album to be superfluous: "Nothing on this disc is really a motivated purchase point and it seems more like an outlet for the cast of Evangelion to kick back and let loose with the vocal cords".

Track listing: Neon Genesis Evangelion Addition
| No. | Title | Lyrics | Music | Vocals | Length |
|---|---|---|---|---|---|
| 1. | "A Cruel Angel's Thesis (Director's Edit Version II)" | Neko Oikawa | Hidetoshi Satō | Kotono Mitsuishi, Megumi Hayashibara and Yuko Miyamura | 4:04 |
| 2. | "Drama: Shuukyoku no Tsudzuki" | | | Evangelion vocal cast | 21:24 |
| 3. | "Fly Me to the Moon -Misato 4 Beat TV Size Version-" | Bart Howard | Howard | Mitsuishi | 1:32 |
| 4. | "Fly Me to the Moon (Asuka Bossa Techno TV Size Version)" | Howard | Howard | Miyamura | 1:27 |
| 5. | "Chorus: Hallelujah Chorus (Messiah)" | | Handel | | 3:40 |
| 6. | "Chorus: Worthy is the Lamb...Amen (Messiah)" | | Handel | | 6:46 |
| 7. | "4th Mov: Presto" (Symphony No. 9 in D minor Op. 125 "Choral" ("Ode to Joy")) | | Beethoven | | 23:08 |
| 8. | "Tentoumushi no SAMBA (Ladybug Samba)" | Daizō Saitō | Shunichi Makaino | Megumi Ogata, Miyamura, Miki Nagasawa and Junko Iwao | 1:16 |
| 9. | "Fly Me to the Moon (Main Version II)" | Howard | Howard | Mitsuishi, Hayashibara and Miyamura | 4:30 |
| 10. | "Gekijouban Yokoku – Misato Katsuragi (Movie trailer)" (Jikai Yokoku) | | | Mitsuishi | 0:29 |
| 11. | "Gekijouban Yokoku – Rei Ayanami (Movie trailer)" (Borderline Case) | | | Hayashibara | 0:37 |
| 12. | "Gekijouban Yokoku – Asuka Langley Soryu (Movie trailer)" (Jikai Yokoku) | | | Miyamura | 0:30 |
| Total length: | | | | | 69:29 |

=== Evangelion Death ===
The album Evangelion Death was released on 11 June 1997. The album reached number one on the Oricon charts and was certified platinum.

All music is composed by Shirō Sagisu unless otherwise specified.

Evangelion: Death
| No. | Title | Music | Length |
|---|---|---|---|
| 1. | "チェロ――第四弦 調弦" (Cello - Dai-shi Tsuru Chōgen, "Cello - Fourth String Tuning") | | 0:25 |
| 2. | "Suiten für Violoncello solo Nr.1 G-dur, BWV. 1007 1. Vorspier" | Bach | 0:42 |
| 3. | "Dvořák: Original Complete Version" | Dvořák | 0:33 |
| 4. | "ヴァイオリン――第二弦 調弦" (Violin - Dai-ni Tsuru Chōgen, "Violin - Second String Tuning") | | 0:22 |
| 5. | "Partita III für Violino solo E-dur, BWV. 1006 3. Gavotte in Rondo" | Bach | 0:22 |
| 6. | "ヴィオラ――第三弦 調弦" (Viola - Dai-san Tsuru Chōgen, "Viola - Third String Tuning") | | 1:08 |
| 7. | "優しさの代理" (Yasashisa no Dairi, "Substitute for Gentleness") | | 0:25 |
| 8. | "吾への、涙" (Ware e no, Namida, "Tears Toward Oneself") | | 2:05 |
| 9. | "未了への、調律" (Miryō e no Chōritsu, "Tuning to Imperfection") | | 0:17 |
| 10. | "Kanon D-dur (Quartet)" | Pachelbel | 4:58 |
| 11. | "The Sorrow of Losing the Object of One's Dependence II" | Howard, Sagisu | 1:32 |
| 12. | "虚妄への、依存" (Kyomō e no, Izon, "Reliance Leads to Falsehood") | | 1:47 |
| 13. | "脆弱な、自我境界" (Zeijakuna, Jiga Kyōkai, "A Fragile Ego Border") | | 2:10 |
| 14. | "Kanon D-dur (Strings Orchestra)" | Pachelbel | 5:06 |
| 15. | "偽りの、再生" (Itsuwari no, Saisei, "False Regeneration") | | 2:25 |
| 16. | "Dies irae (Requiem)" | Verdi | 37:04 |
| Total length: | | | 61:21 |

=== The End of Evangelion ===
The End of Evangelion was released on 26 September 1997. The album reached number three on the Oricon charts and was certified gold.

All music is composed by Shirō Sagisu unless otherwise specified.

The End of Evangelion
| No. | Title | Music | Vocals | Length |
|---|---|---|---|---|
| 1. | "他人の干渉" (Tanin no Kanshō, "Interference of Others") | | | 2:21 |
| 2. | "真夏の終演" (Manatsu no Shūen, "The End of Midsummer") | | | 2:24 |
| 3. | "退行への緊急避難" (Taikō e no Kinkyūhinan, "Emergency Evacuation to Regression") | | | 4:18 |
| 4. | "偽りの、再生" (Itsuwari no, Saisei, "False Regeneration") | | | 2:30 |
| 5. | "身代わりの侵入" (Migawari no Shinnyū, "Substitute Invasion") | | | 3:30 |
| 6. | "II. Air (Orchestral Suite No. 3 in D Major, BWV 1068)" | Bach | | 3:24 |
| 7. | "空しき流れ" (Munashiki Nagare, "The Passage of Emptiness") | | | 6:17 |
| 8. | "THANATOS (IF I CAN’T BE YOURS)" | | Lorraine "Loren" Briscoe, Mash | 4:53 |
| 9. | "始まりへの逃避" (Hajimari e no Tōhi, "Escape to the Beginning") | | | 5:00 |
| 10. | "不安との蜜月" (Fuan to no Mitsugetsu, "Honeymoon with Anxiety") | | | 1:40 |
| 11. | "Komm, susser Tod / 甘き死よ、来たれ (M-10 Director's Edit Version)" (Amaki Shi yo, Kitare, "Come, Sweet Death") | | Arianne | 7:46 |
| 12. | "Jesus bleibet meine Freude (Herz und Mund und Tat und Leben BWV.147) / 主よ、人の望みの喜びよ" (Omo yo, Hito no Nozomi no Yorokobi yo, "Lord, Joy of Man's Desiring"; Piano arrangement by Jan Panenka) | Bach | | 4:50 |
| 13. | "閉塞の拡大" (Heisoku no Kakudai, "Expansion of Blockade") | | | 6:54 |
| 14. | "夢のスキマ" (Yume no Sukima, "Opening of Dream") | | | 1:25 |
| Total length: | | | | 57:12 |

=== Neon Genesis Evangelion: S² Works ===
Neon Genesis Evangelion: S² Works was released in Japan on 4 December 1998. The album appeared twice on the Oricon charts, peaking at number 38. Several unreleased pieces, or variations of pieces already used in the classic series, were included in the seven-disc album. King Records also included a phone card and a booklet containing explanations and lyrics of the songs with the album.

All music is composed by Shirō Sagisu unless specified.

Track listing: Neon Genesis Evangelion: S^{2} Works (CD1)
| No. | Title | Music | Length |
|---|---|---|---|
| 1. | "A-1" (Rei I) | | 3:00 |
| 2. | "A-2" (Background Music) | | 1:57 |
| 3. | "A-3" (NERV) | | 1:59 |
| 4. | "A-3 without Harp" | | 1:58 |
| 5. | "A-3 Rhythm only" | | 1:57 |
| 6. | "A-4" (Borderline Case) | | 2:21 |
| 7. | "A-4 Synth voice only" (Do You Love Me?) | | 2:21 |
| 8. | "A-5" (Advancement of the Human Instrumentality Project) | | 2:16 |
| 9. | "A-6" (I. Shinji) | | 2:02 |
| 10. | "A-7" (Angel Attack II) | | 2:00 |
| 11. | "A-7 Rhythm and synth" | | 2:00 |
| 12. | "A-7 Synth only" | | 2:00 |
| 13. | "A-7 Bridge" | | 0:47 |
| 14. | "A-8" (Angel's Arrival – quiet and eerie) | | 3:29 |
| 15. | "A-9" (Angel Attack III) | | 2:26 |
| 16. | "A-9 Synth only" | | 2:24 |
| 17. | "A-10" (Mother Is the First Other) | | 2:26 |
| 18. | "A-10 Synth voice only" (Splitting of the Breast) | | 2:16 |
| 19. | "A-11" (Depression) | | 2:36 |
| 20. | "A-11 Synth voice only" | | 1:23 |
| 21. | "A-12" (Introjection) | | 2:27 |
| 22. | "A-13" (Separation Anxiety) | | 2:28 |
| 23. | "A-13 Rhythm only" | | 2:28 |
| 24. | "B-1" (Hedgehog's Dilemma) | | 2:48 |
| 25. | "B-2" (In the Depths of Human Hearts) | | 2:24 |
| 26. | "B-3" (Background Music III) | | 2:34 |
| 27. | "B-4" (Fly Me to the Moon) | Bart Howard | 2:59 |
| 28. | "B-4 Strings and piano" (Those women longed for the touch of others' lips, and thus invited their kisses.) | Howard | 2:21 |
| 29. | "B-4 Strings" | Howard | 1:23 |
| 30. | "B-4 Piano" | Howard | 1:11 |
| 31. | "B-4 Guitar and piano" | Howard | 1:12 |
| 32. | "B-4 Guitar and piano/Lonely" (The Sorrow of Losing the Object of One's Dependence II) | Howard | 1:34 |
| 33. | "B-4 Piano/Lonely" (The Sorrow of Losing the Object of One's Dependence) | Howard | 1:33 |
| Total length: | | | 71:02 |

Track listing: Neon Genesis Evangelion: S^{2} Works (CD2)
| No. | Title | Music | Length |
|---|---|---|---|
| 1. | "B-5" (Requiem, Sorrow) | | 3:08 |
| 2. | "B-6" (Anxiety) | | 1:57 |
| 3. | "B-7" (When I Find Peace of Mind) | | 3:35 |
| 4. | "B-8" (Determination and Anger) | | 2:33 |
| 5. | "B-9" (Infantile Dependence, Adult Dependency) | | 3:02 |
| 6. | "B-9 Without rhythm" | | 3:02 |
| 7. | "B-10" (Menace and Surprise) | | 2:13 |
| 8. | "B-10 Without guitar" | | 2:13 |
| 9. | "B-12" (Both of You, Dance Like You Want to Win!) | | 1:52 |
| 10. | "B-13" (Oppression and Impatience) | | 1:42 |
| 11. | "B-14" (The Day Tokyo-3 Stood Still) | | 1:42 |
| 12. | "B-15" (Liberation, Catalysis) | | 2:16 |
| 13. | "B-16" (Misato) | | 1:34 |
| 14. | "B-16 Rhythm only" | | 1:33 |
| 15. | "B-17" (Asuka Strikes!) | | 2:23 |
| 16. | "B-17 Rhythm only" | | 2:23 |
| 17. | "B-18" (Feeling at Peace – Hope) | Bart Howard | 2:12 |
| 18. | "B-18 Only flute" | Howard | 2:12 |
| 19. | "B-18 Slow tempo" | Howard | 2:25 |
| 20. | "B-18 Slow tempo/Only flute" | Howard | 2:26 |
| 21. | "B-19" (Friendship) | | 1:34 |
| 22. | "B-20" (Rei II) | | 2:57 |
| 23. | "C-1" (Pleasant Morning) | | 2:47 |
| 24. | "C-1 Without Latin percussion" | | 2:47 |
| 25. | "C-2" (Barefoot in the Park) | | 2:37 |
| 26. | "C-3" (Relaxed and Heartwarming Day) | | 2:15 |
| 27. | "C-4" (Waking up in the morning) | | 1:31 |
| 28. | "C-5" (Ritsuko) | | 3:04 |
| 29. | "C-6" (A Crystalline Night Sky) | | 2:22 |
| 30. | "C-7" (Tokyo-3) | | 2:25 |
| 31. | "D-1" (Violent Situations with Guns) | | 0:30 |
| 32. | "D-2" (Shock) | | 0:24 |
| 33. | "D-3" (Substitute for Gentleness) | | 0:26 |
| 34. | "D-4" (Everyday Scenes and Diversions) | | 0:25 |
| 35. | "D-5" (Comical Scenes and Diversions) | | 0:22 |
| 36. | "D-6" (Peaceful) | | 0:28 |
| 37. | "D-7" (Beautiful) | | 0:41 |
| 38. | "D-8" (Romance) | | 0:34 |
| 39. | "D-8 Piano" | | 0:27 |
| 40. | "D-9" (Plaintive) | | 0:38 |
| 41. | "D-10" (Hastiness) | | 0:46 |
| 42. | "D-11" (Fear/Panic) | | 0:33 |
| Total length: | | | 76:56 |

Track listing: Neon Genesis Evangelion: S^{2} Works (CD3)
| No. | Title | Length |
|---|---|---|
| 1. | "E-1" (Decisive Battle) | 2:25 |
| 2. | "E-1 Rhythm only" (Spending Time in Preparation) | 2:24 |
| 3. | "E-2" (Suspense – Light) | 1:55 |
| 4. | "E-2 Without Brass" | 1:14 |
| 5. | "E-3" (EVA-01) | 2:49 |
| 6. | "E-4" (EVA-02) | 2:00 |
| 7. | "E-5" (EVA-00) | 1:51 |
| 8. | "E-5 Rhythm Only" | 1:50 |
| 9. | "E-5 Fast tempo" (The Beast) | 1:40 |
| 10. | "E-5 Rhythm only/Fast tempo" (Harbinger of Tragedy) | 1:40 |
| 11. | "E-6" (Angel Attack) | 2:32 |
| 12. | "E-7" (Marking Time, Waiting For Death) | 2:44 |
| 13. | "E-8" (Pleasure Principle) | 3:50 |
| 14. | "E-9" (A Step Forward Into Terror) | 1:55 |
| 15. | "E-9 Without Intro Fanfare" | 1:39 |
| 16. | "E-9 Rhythm Only" | 1:38 |
| 17. | "E-10" | 2:35 |
| 18. | "E-10 Rhythm Only" | 2:35 |
| 19. | "E-11" | 1:56 |
| 20. | "F-0" | 0:09 |
| 21. | "F-0 Without Speech" | 0:09 |
| 22. | "F-0 Only Speech" | 0:07 |
| 23. | "F-1" | 0:09 |
| 24. | "F-1 Without Speech" | 0:09 |
| 25. | "F-1 Speech Only" | 0:08 |
| 26. | "F-2" (Jikai Yokoku) | 0:33 |
| 27. | "F-2 Light Version" | 0:33 |
| 28. | "F-4" | 0:07 |
| 29. | "Title Speech A-Type" | 0:32 |
| 30. | "Title Speech B-Type" | 0:19 |
| 31. | "A-13 A-Type" | 2:09 |
| 32. | "A-13 B-Type" (Crime of Innocence) | 2:28 |
| 33. | "A-13 C-Type" (Hostility Restrain) | 1:39 |
| 34. | "A-13 D-Type" | 1:25 |
| 35. | "A-13 E-Type" | 1:33 |
| 36. | "A-14" (Rei III) | 3:44 |
| 37. | "A-14 Fast Tempo" | 2:45 |
| 38. | "A-15" (She said, "Don't make others suffer for your personal hatred.") | 1:56 |
| 39. | "A-15 Rhythm Only" | 1:56 |
| 40. | "A-15 Drums" | 1:54 |
| 41. | "A-15 Slow Tempo" | 2:00 |
| 42. | "A-15 Slow Tempo/Rhythm Only" | 2:00 |
| 43. | "A-15 Slow Tempo/Drums" | 1:58 |
| 44. | "A-16" (Theme of NERV) | 1:35 |
| 45. | "A-16 Rhythm Only" | 1:33 |
| 46. | "A-16 Strings" (Background Music II) | 1:33 |
| Total length: | | 76:16 |

Track listing: Neon Genesis Evangelion: S^{2} Works (CD4)
| No. | Title | Music | Length |
|---|---|---|---|
| 1. | "B-21" (A Moment When Tension Breaks) | | 4:11 |
| 2. | "B-21 Rhythm only" | | 4:11 |
| 3. | "B-21 Guitar and piano" | | 4:11 |
| 4. | "B-21 Fast tempo" | | 3:54 |
| 5. | "B-21 Fast tempo/Rhythm only" | | 3:54 |
| 6. | "B-21 Fast tempo/Guitar and piano" | | 3:51 |
| 7. | "B-22 A-Type (Note: A truncated version of this piece appears on the soundtrack Neon Genesis Evangelion II.)" | Bart Howard | 2:19 |
| 8. | "B-22 B-Type" | Howard | 2:35 |
| 9. | "B-22 C-Type" | Howard | 2:18 |
| 10. | "C-55 A-Type" | | 1:49 |
| 11. | "C-55 B-Type" | | 1:56 |
| 12. | "C-55 C-Type" | | 2:06 |
| 13. | "C-55 D-Type" (Three of Me, One of Someone else) | | 2:19 |
| 14. | "C-55 E-Type" | | 2:11 |
| 15. | "C-55 F-Type" | | 1:46 |
| 16. | "E-12" (Battle – Light "Pinch") | | 2:19 |
| 17. | "E-12 Rhythm only" | | 2:18 |
| 18. | "E-13" (Thanatos) | | 3:30 |
| 19. | "E-13 Rhythm only" | | 3:27 |
| 20. | "E-14" (Battle) | | 2:31 |
| 21. | "E-14 Rhythm only" | | 2:30 |
| 22. | "E-15" (Magmadiver) | | 2:24 |
| 23. | "E-15 Rhythm only" | | 2:09 |
| 24. | "E-15 Fast tempo" | | 1:02 |
| 25. | "E-15 Fast tempo/Rhythm only" | | 0:58 |
| 26. | "E-16" (The Beast II) | | 2:19 |
| 27. | "E-16 Rhythm only" | | 2:18 |
| 28. | "E-16 Fast tempo" (Normal Blood) | | 1:57 |
| 29. | "E-16 Fast tempo/Rhythm only" | | 1:54 |
| Total length: | | | 75:08 |

Track listing: Neon Genesis Evangelion: S^{2} Works (CD5)
| No. | Title | Music | Length |
|---|---|---|---|
| 1. | "F-3 Take 1 (Note: From Bach's "Suiten für Violoncello solo Nr. 1 G-Dur, BWV 1007 1. Vorspiel.")" | Johann Sebastian Bach | 1:32 |
| 2. | "F-3 Take 2" (CHILDHOOD MEMORIES, SHUT AWAY) | Bach | 0:37 |
| 3. | "OP-1" (A Cruel Angel's Thesis) | Hidetoshi Satō | 2:31 |
| 4. | "OP-1 Strings" | Satō | 2:17 |
| 5. | "OP-1 Strings/Slow tempo" (THE HEADY FEELING OF FREEDOM) | Satō | 1:50 |
| 6. | "OP-2 A-Type" | Satō | 1:21 |
| 7. | "OP-2 B-Type" | Satō | 1:48 |
| 8. | "OP-2 C-Type" | Satō | 1:57 |
| 9. | "OP-2 D-Type" (Good, or Don't Be.) | Satō | 1:23 |
| 10. | "ED-1 A-Type" | Bart Howard | 1:49 |
| 11. | "ED-1 B-Type" | Howard | 1:56 |
| 12. | "A-4 Different version" (A Fragile Ego Border) | | 2:11 |
| 13. | "A-4 Zakazaka version" (Honeymoon with Anxiety) | | 1:38 |
| 14. | "A-4 Strings version" | | 1:21 |
| 15. | "A-4 Lonely version" | | 1:26 |
| 16. | "A-4 Lonely version/With piano" | | 1:27 |
| 17. | "A-4 Lonely version/With piano/Melody unison" | | 1:27 |
| 18. | "A-4 Violin solo" (Reliance Leading to Falsehood) | | 1:48 |
| 19. | "A-4 Piano solo" | | 2:09 |
| 20. | "A-4 Piano/Normal version" | | 1:17 |
| 21. | "A-4 Piano/Lonely version" | | 1:22 |
| 22. | "A-4 Piano/Leave It To Version" (Opening of Dream) | | 1:27 |
| 23. | "E-13 Short Piece 1" | | 2:06 |
| 24. | "E-13 Short Piece 2/With piano" | | 2:05 |
| 25. | "E-13 Short Piece 2/Without piano" | | 2:05 |
| 26. | "E-13 Short Piece/Fast tempo/With piano" (Tears Toward Oneself) | | 2:07 |
| 27. | "E-13 Short Piece/Fast tempo/Without piano" | | 2:07 |
| 28. | "E-13 Rhythm only/Modified version" (Substitute Invasion) | | 3:29 |
| 29. | "M-2" (Piano Music 2 – Light Etude) | | 3:03 |
| 30. | "M-3" (The Passage of Emptiness) | | 6:17 |
| 31. | "M-3 Suite" | | 0:51 |
| 32. | "M-4" (Escape to The Beginning) | | 4:58 |
| 33. | "M-4 Chorus only" (Emergency Evacuation to Regression) | | 4:15 |
| 34. | "M-5" (Tragic Choral Music) | | 3:45 |
| Total length: | | | 73:43 |

Track listing: Neon Genesis Evangelion: S^{2} Works (CD6)
| No. | Title | Lyrics | Vocals | Length |
|---|---|---|---|---|
| 1. | "M-6 Slow Tempo" | | | 2:53 |
| 2. | "M-6 Slow Tempo/Without Guitar" | | | 2:52 |
| 3. | "M-6 Slow Tempo/Rhythm Only" | | | 2:53 |
| 4. | "M-6 Fast Tempo" | | | 2:20 |
| 5. | "M-6 Fast Tempo/Without Guitar" | | | 2:19 |
| 6. | "M-6 Fast Tempo/Rhythm Only (Old version)" | | | 2:18 |
| 7. | "M-6 Fast Tempo/Rhythm Only" (Interference of Others) | | | 2:19 |
| 8. | "M-6 Fast Tempo/Modified Version" (The End of Midsummer) | | | 2:21 |
| 9. | "M-7B (Note: This version was included on the soundtrack for Evangelion: Death and Rebirth.)" (False Regeneration) | | | 2:28 |
| 10. | "M-7B Without Woodwinds" | | | 2:28 |
| 11. | "M-7B New Mix (Note: This version was included on the soundtrack for The End of Evangelion.)" (False Regeneration) | | | 2:28 |
| 12. | "M-8" (Tragic Battle – Asuka's Death) | | | 2:26 |
| 13. | "M-8 Chorus Delay" | | | 2:26 |
| 14. | "M-9" (Liberation of Souls) | | | 6:48 |
| 15. | "M-9 Modified Version" (Expansion of Blockage) | | | 6:52 |
| 16. | "M-10" (Komm, süsser Tod (Single version)) | Hideaki Anno, Mike Wyzgowski | Arianne Schreiber | 7:55 |
| 17. | "M-10 Director's Edit Version" (Komm, süsser Tod (Album version)) | Anno, Wyzgowski | Arianne | 7:45 |
| 18. | "M-11 (Note: Later included as a track on the 2003 soundtrack Refrain of Evangelion.)" (Everything You've Ever Dreamed) | Anno, Wyzgowski | Arianne | 6:42 |
| Total length: | | | | 68:35 |

Track listing: Neon Genesis Evangelion: S^{2} Works (Bonus CD)
| No. | Title | Lyrics | Music | Vocals | Length |
|---|---|---|---|---|---|
| 1. | "Cello Tuning" | | | | 0:26 |
| 2. | "Suiten für Violoncello solo Nr. 1 G-Dur, BWV 1007 1. Vorspiel" | | Johann Sebastian Bach | | 0:43 |
| 3. | "Dvořák: Original Complete Version (Note: From Dvořák's "Cello Concerto in B minor, Op. 104, B. 191 1. Allegro".)" | | Antonín Dvořák | | 0:33 |
| 4. | "Violin Tuning" | | | | 0:23 |
| 5. | "Partita III für Violinesolo E-Dur, BWV 1006 3. Gavotte en Rondeau" | | Bach | | 0:22 |
| 6. | "Viola Tuning" | | | | 1:10 |
| 7. | "Tuning Panorama" ("Tuning to Imperfection" (未了への、調律, Miryō he no, Chōritsu)) | | | | 0:18 |
| 8. | "Kanon D-Dur" | | Johann Pachelbel | | 5:08 |
| 9. | "Kanon D-Dur (Double Quintet)" | | Pachelbel | | 5:07 |
| 10. | "Kanon D-Dur (Quintet)" | | Pachelbel | | 5:01 |
| 11. | "Kanon D-Dur (Quintet/No harpsichord)" | | Pachelbel | | 5:01 |
| 12. | "II. Air (Orchestral Suite No. 3 in D Major, BWV 1068) (Slow Tempo)" | | Bach | | 3:57 |
| 13. | "II. Air (Orchestral Suite No. 3 in D Major, BWV 1068)" | | Bach | | 3:23 |
| 14. | "Jesus bleibet meine Freude (Herz und Mund und Tat und Leben, BWV 147) (Strings/Fast Tempo)" | | Bach | | 3:10 |
| 15. | "Jesus bleibet meine Freude (Herz und Mund und Tat und Leben, BWV 147) (Strings)" | | Bach | | 3:47 |
| 16. | "M-10 Without Intro/A-Type" | Hideaki Anno, Mike Wyzgowski | Shirō Sagisu | Arianne Schreiber | 7:05 |
| 17. | "M-10 Without Intro/B-Type" | Anno, Wyzgowski | Sagisu | Arianne | 7:04 |
| 18. | "M-13 Take 1 (Unfinished)" (A-4 Heavy Version) | | | | 6:16 |
| 19. | "M-13 Take 2 (Unfinished)" | | | | 6:16 |
| 20. | "M-14 (Unedited)" (Dignified Battle Music) | | | | 2:16 |
| 21. | "M-14 Second Half (Unedited)" | | | | 0:36 |
| 22. | "M-15 (Unfinished)" (Theme of Love Piano) | | | | 4:08 |
| 23. | "Thanatos -If I Can't Be Yours-" (E-13) | Mash | Sagisu | Loren & Mash | 4:51 |
| Total length: | | | | | 77:01 |

=== Music from Evangelion: 1.0 You Are (Not) Alone ===
Music from Evangelion: 1.0 You Are (Not) Alone is the first soundtrack album featuring music from the film Evangelion: 1.0 You Are (Not) Alone, composed by Shirō Sagisu. The album, which features unedited tracks, was released on 25 September 2007 by Starchild. Most of the songs are new versions of background music from the original Evangelion animated television series. The score was recorded by the London Studio Orchestra at Abbey Road Studios in London, England. The album peaked at number 28 on the Oricon charts, making 6 appearances in total.

=== Evangelion: 1.0 You Are (Not) Alone Original Soundtrack ===
Evangelion: 1.0 You Are (Not) Alone Original Soundtrack (catalog number KICA 886) is the second soundtrack album of the 2007 film Evangelion: 1.0 You Are (Not) Alone. It features music composed by Shirō Sagisu, edited for film length, as well as the film's theme songs performed by Hikaru Utada and three bonus songs. It peaked at number 38 on the Oricon albums chart, making a total of 9 appearances on the chart.

=== Evangelion: 2.0 You Can (Not) Advance Original Soundtrack ===
Evangelion: 2.0 You Can (Not) Advance Original Soundtrack is the soundtrack album of the 2009 film Evangelion: 2.0 You Can (Not) Advance. It features music composed by Shirō Sagisu and performed by the London Studio Orchestra as well as a choir of four. It peaked at number 8 in the Oricon album charts, charting for a total of 16 weeks.

=== Music from Evangelion: 3.0 You Can (Not) Redo ===
Music from Evangelion: 3.0 You Can (Not) Redo is the soundtrack album of the 2012 film Evangelion: 3.0 You Can (Not) Redo. It features music composed by Shiro Sagisu. The music featured is presented in its entirety, without being edited for film length. The album was released on 28 November 2012.

=== Evangelion: 3.0 You Can (Not) Redo Original Soundtrack ===
Evangelion: 3.0 You Can (Not) Redo Original Soundtrack is the second soundtrack album of Evangelion: 3.0 You Can (Not) Redo. It features music composed by Shirō Sagisu, as they were edited for use in the film, as well as the film's credit song performed by Hikaru Utada. It was sold as a first press release with the Blu-Ray and DVD of the movie and was released on 24 April 2013.

=== Music from "Shin Evangelion" Evangelion: 3.0+1.0 ===
Music from "Shin Evangelion" Evangelion: 3.0+1.0 is the soundtrack album of the 2021 film Evangelion: 3.0+1.0 Thrice Upon a Time. It features the film's unedited tracks, composed by Shirō Sagisu. The album was released on 17 March 2021.

== Compilation albums ==
=== The Day of Second Impact ===
"Jesus bleibet meine Freunde", used for The End of Evangelion and included in The Day of Second Impact

Evangelion: The Day of Second Impact was released on 13 September 2000, the date on which a catastrophic event called Second Impact occurs within the fictional narrative of the series. It included "A Cruel Angel's Thesis", "Fly Me to the Moon" and several other tracks that had already been released on previous albums. The album ranked twice on the Oricon charts, reaching number 20. Outside Japan, it was released by Geneon Entertainment. Jonathan Mays of Anime News Network praised the album, especially for its inclusion of what he called the series' best tracks.

Track listing: The Day of Second Impact
| No. | Title | Lyrics | Music | Vocals | Length |
|---|---|---|---|---|---|
| 1. | "Angel Attack" (E-6) | | Shirō Sagisu | | 2:33 |
| 2. | "A Cruel Angel's Thesis (Director's Edit Version)" | Neko Oikawa | Hidetoshi Satō | Yoko Takahashi | 4:06 |
| 3. | "Decisive Battle" (E-1) | | Sagisu | | 2:26 |
| 4. | "Fly Me to the Moon" | Bart Howard | Howard | Claire Littley | 4:33 |
| 5. | "Thanatos" (E-13) | | Sagisu | | 3:31 |
| 6. | "Kanon D-Dur (Strings orchestra)" | | Johann Pachelbel | | 5:09 |
| 7. | "Soul's Refrain" | Oikawa | Toshiyuki Ohmori | Takahashi | 5:15 |
| 8. | "II. Air (Orchestral Suite No. 3 in D Major, BWV 1068)" | | Johann Sebastian Bach | | 3:25 |
| 9. | "Thanatos -If I Can't Be Yours-" | Mash | Sagisu | Loren & Mash | 4:53 |
| 10. | "Komm, süsser Tod (M-10 Director's Edit Version)" | Hideaki Anno, Mike Wyzgowski | Sagisu | Arianne Schreiber | 7:43 |
| 11. | "Jesus bleibet meine Freude (Herz und Mund und Tat und Leben, BWV 147)" ((ストリングス) (—Sutoringusu Jesu, Joy of Man's Desiring Heart and Mouth and Deed and Life, BWV 147) (Strings)) | | Bach | | 3:46 |
| Total length: | | | | | 47:20 |

=== Evangelion: The Birthday of Rei Ayanami ===
Evangelion: The Birthday of Rei Ayanami was released on 30 March 2001 to celebrate Rei Ayanami's birthday. It included several songs related to the character and a version of "A Cruel Angel's Thesis" sung by Megumi Hayashibara, Rei's Japanese voice actress. Hayashibara stated that in singing the song, she was thinking of the scene in which Rei smiles for the first time at Shinji Ikari in the film version of Evangelion, avoiding giving the impression of a cold character. The album placed three times on the Oricon charts, reaching number 45.

All music is composed by Shirō Sagisu unless specified.

Track listing: The Birthday of Rei Ayanami
| No. | Title | Lyrics | Music | Vocals | Length |
|---|---|---|---|---|---|
| 1. | "A Cruel Angel's Thesis (A.D. 2001)" | Neko Oikawa | Hidetoshi Satō | Megumi Hayashibara | 4:45 |
| 2. | "Rei I" (A-1) | | | | 2:59 |
| 3. | "Hedgehog's Dilemma" (B-1) | | | | 2:51 |
| 4. | "Rei II" (B-20) | | | | 2:57 |
| 5. | "Fly Me to the Moon (Ayanami Version)" | Bart Howard | Howard | Hayashibara | 4:33 |
| 6. | "Do you love me?" (A-4 Synth Voice Only) | | | | 2:20 |
| 7. | "Hostility Restrained" (A-13C) | | | | 1:39 |
| 8. | "Good, or Don't Be" (OP-2 D-type) | | Satō | | 1:26 |
| 9. | "Soul's Refrain (Aqua Groove mix)" | Oikawa | Toshiyuki Ohmori | Hayashibara | 5:29 |
| 10. | "Hajimari e no Tōhi" (M-4) | | | | 4:58 |
| 11. | "Heisoku no Kakudai" (M-9) | | | | 6:52 |
| 12. | "Yume no Sukima" (A-4 Piano/Leave It To Version) | | | | 1:33 |
| 13. | "Thanatos -If I Can't Be Yours- (Instrumental)" | | | | 7:15 |
| 14. | "Fly Me to the Moon (Instrumental)" | | Howard | | 4:33 |
| Total length: | | | | | 54:18 |

=== Refrain of Evangelion ===
Suite n. 1 by Bach

Refrain of Evangelion was released on 24 July 2003 to coincide with the release of the Renewal of Evangelion home video edition; the album included 26 tracks, including "Everything You've Ever Dreamed", a track originally intended for The End of Evangelion.

All music is composed by Shirō Sagisu unless specified.

Track listing: Refrain of Evangelion
| No. | Title | Lyrics | Music | Vocals | Length |
|---|---|---|---|---|---|
| 1. | "Suiten Fur Violincello Solo Nr. 1 G-dur, BWV. 1007 1. Vorspiel" | | Johann Sebastian Bach | | 0:42 |
| 2. | "Decisive Battle" (E-1) | | | | 2:25 |
| 3. | "Angel Attack" (E-6) | | | | 2:33 |
| 4. | "The Beast" (E-5 Fast tempo) | | | | 1:41 |
| 5. | "Thanatos" (E-13) | | | | 3:31 |
| 6. | "Marking Time, Waiting for Death" (E-7) | | | | 2:45 |
| 7. | "The Beast II" (E-16) | | | | 2:20 |
| 8. | "Kanon D-dur" | | Johann Pachelbel (Strings orchestra) | | 5:09 |
| 9. | "Rei I" (A-1) | | | | 3:01 |
| 10. | "Misato" (B-16) | | | | 1:34 |
| 11. | "Asuka Strikes!" (B-17) | | | | 2:25 |
| 12. | "Fly Me to the Moon (Aya Bossa Techno TV Size Version)" | Bart Howard | Howard | Aya | 1:10 |
| 13. | "Fly Me to the Moon (Aki Jungle TV Size Version)" | Howard | Howard | Aki | 1:09 |
| 14. | "Fly Me to the Moon (Main Version II/Renewal #16)" | Howard | Howard | Kotono Mitsuishi, Megumi Hayashibara, Yuko Miyamura | 1:08 |
| 15. | "Jikai Yokoku (30 second version)" (F-2) | | | | 0:33 |
| 16. | "A Cruel Angel's Thesis (TV Size Version)" | Neko Oikawa | Hidetoshi Satō | Yoko Takahashi | 1:33 |
| 17. | "Soul's Refrain" | Oikawa | Toshiyuki Ohmori | Takahashi | 5:13 |
| 18. | "Thanatos -If I Can't Be Yours-" | Mash | Shirō Sagisu | Loren & Mash | 4:53 |
| 19. | "Mother Is the First Other" (A-10) | | | | 2:28 |
| 20. | "Borderline Case" (A-4) | | | | 2:23 |
| 21. | "Expansion of Blockade" (M-9 Modified Version) | | | | 6:53 |
| 22. | "The Heady Feeling of Freedom" (OP-1 Strings/Slow tempo) | | Satō | | 1:50 |
| 23. | "Good, or Don't Be" (OP-2 D-type) | | Satō | | 1:25 |
| 24. | "Opening of a Dream" (A-4 Piano/Leave It To Version) | | | | 1:30 |
| 25. | "Komm, süsser Tod" (M-10) | Hideaki Anno, Mike Wyzgowski | Sagisu | Arianne Schreiber | 7:58 |
| 26. | "Everything You've Ever Dreamed" (M-11) | Anno, Wyzgowski | Sagisu | Arianne Schreiber | 6:41 |
| Total length: | | | | | 74:53 |

=== Neon Genesis Evangelion Decade ===
Neon Genesis Evangelion Decade was released on 26 October 2005, on the occasion of the tenth anniversary of the series. It included several tracks featured on previous albums, a previously unreleased track performed by Hayashibara as Rei and a new version of the series' theme song. The first release was included inside a special cardboard case and accompanied by previously unreleased official illustrations. The album ranked for 91 weeks on the Oricon charts, reaching number 24.

Track listing: Neon Genesis Evangelion Decade
| No. | Title | Lyrics | Music | Vocals | Length |
|---|---|---|---|---|---|
| 1. | "A Cruel Angel's Thesis (Director's Edit Version)" (残酷な天使のテーゼ Zankoku na Tenshi no Tēze) | Neko Oikawa | Hidetoshi Satō | Yoko Takahashi | 4:07 |
| 2. | "Fly Me to the Moon" | Bart Howard | Howard | Claire Littley | 4:34 |
| 3. | "Moon's Labyrinth" (月の迷宮 Tsuki no Meikyu) | Oikawa | Toshiyuki Ohmori | Takahashi | 5:47 |
| 4. | "A Vision" (予感 Yokan) | Oikawa | Ohmori | Takahashi | 4:56 |
| 5. | "Happiness is the Smell of Sin" (幸せは罪の匂い Shiawase wa Tsumi no Nioi) | Oikawa | Ohmori | Takahashi | 4:39 |
| 6. | "Eternal Embrace" (無限抱擁 Mugen Hōyō) | Oikawa | Takahashi | Takahashi | 5:26 |
| 7. | "Fly Me to the Moon (Main Version II)" | Howard | Howard | Kotono Mitsuishi, Megumi Hayashibara, Yuko Miyamura | 4:34 |
| 8. | "Soul's Refrain" (魂のルフラン Tamashii no Rufuran) | Oikawa | Ohmori | Takahashi | 5:16 |
| 9. | "I'm Back to the Primitive Mind" (心よ原始に戻れ Kokoro yo Genshi ni Modore) | Oikawa | Satō | Takahashi | 4:52 |
| 10. | "Thanatos -If I Can't Be Yours-" | Mash | Shirō Sagisu | Loren & Mash | 4:52 |
| 11. | "Komm, süsser Tod (M-10 Director's Edit Version)" | Hideaki Anno, Mike Wyzgowski | Sagisu | Arianne Schreiber | 7:45 |
| 12. | "A Cruel Angel's Thesis (10th Anniversary Version)" (残酷な天使のテーゼ Zankoku na Tenshi no Tēze) | Oikawa | Satō | Takahashi | 4:54 |
| 13. | "Soul's Refrain (10th Anniversary Version)" (魂のルフラン Tamashii no Rufuran) | Oikawa | Ohmori | Takahashi | 6:00 |
| 14. | "Memories of Heaven (Note: Original song.)" (天国の記憶 Tengoku no Kioku) | Oikawa | Ohmori | Hayashibara | 6:11 |
| Total length: | | | | | 73:00 |

=== A.T. Eva01 Reference CD ===
A.T. Eva01 Reference CD was released by King Records on 27 December 2007, a few months after the debut of Rebuild. As an accompaniment, King also distributed a pair of Evangelion-themed official headphones.

Track listing: A.T. Eva01 Reference CD
| No. | Title | Vocals | Length |
|---|---|---|---|
| 1. | "Zankoku na tenshi no these" | Yōko Takahashi | 4:06 |
| 2. | "Fly Me to the Moon" | Claire | 4:33 |
| 3. | "Tamashii no rufuran" | Yōko Takahashi | 5:14 |
| 4. | "Thanatos -If I Can't Be Yours-" | Loren&Mash | 4:52 |
| 5. | "Komm, süsser Tod" | Arianne | 7:54 |
| 6. | "Tengoku no kioku" | Megumi Hayashibara | 6:11 |
| Total length: | | | 32:50 |

=== Neon Genesis Evangelion Soundtrack 25th Anniversary Box ===
Neon Genesis Evangelion Soundtrack 25th Anniversary Box was released on 7 October 2020, marking the 25th anniversary of the series. The album, originally scheduled for release on 25 March, comprised several tracks from the classic series and the 1997 film, including a new version of Takahashi's "Fly Me to the Moon", and came with a special booklet. The album managed to place three times on the Oricon charts, reaching number 28.

All music is composed by Shirō Sagisu unless specified.

Track listing: Neon Genesis Evangelion (CD1)
| No. | Title | Lyrics | Music | Vocals | Length |
|---|---|---|---|---|---|
| 1. | "A Cruel Angel's Thesis (Director's Edit Version)" (残酷な天使のテーゼ Zankoku na Tenshi no Tēze) | Neko Oikawa | Hidetoshi Satō | Yoko Takahashi | 4:05 |
| 2. | "Fly Me to the Moon 2020" | Bart Howard | Howard | Takahashi | 4:33 |
| 3. | "Angel Attack" (E-6) | | | | 2:31 |
| 4. | "Rei I" (A-1) | | | | 2:59 |
| 5. | "Hedgehog's Dilemma" (B-1) | | | | 2:47 |
| 6. | "Barefoot in the Park" (C-2) | | | | 2:37 |
| 7. | "Ritsuko" (C-5) | | | | 3:03 |
| 8. | "Misato" (B-16) | | | | 1:32 |
| 9. | "Asuka Strikes!" (B-17) | | | | 2:23 |
| 10. | "NERV" (A-3) | | | | 1:58 |
| 11. | "Tokyo-3" (C-7) | | | | 2:25 |
| 12. | "I. Shinji" (A-6) | | | | 2:02 |
| 13. | "EVA-01" (E-3) | | | | 2:48 |
| 14. | "A Step Forward Into Terror" (E-9) | | | | 1:55 |
| 15. | "EVA-02" (E-4) | | | | 2:00 |
| 16. | "Decisive Battle" (E-1) | | | | 2:24 |
| 17. | "EVA-00" (E-5) | | | | 1:51 |
| 18. | "The Beast" (E-5 Fast tempo) | | | | 1:40 |
| 19. | "Marking Time, Waiting for Death" (E-7) | | | | 2:44 |
| 20. | "Rei II" (B-20) | | | | 2:56 |
| 21. | "Fly Me to the Moon" (B-4) | | Howard | | 2:58 |
| 22. | "Next Episode Preview" (F-2 30-seconds Version) | | | | 0:32 |
| 23. | "Fly Me to the Moon (Yoko Takahashi Acid Bossa Version)" | Howard | Howard | Takahashi | 3:56 |
| 24. | "A Cruel Angel's Thesis (Director's Edit Version II)" | Oikawa | Satō | Kotono Mitsuishi; Megumi Hayashibara; Yūko Miyamura | 4:04 |
| Total length: | | | | | 62:43 |

All music is composed by Shirō Sagisu unless specified.

Track listing: Neon Genesis Evangelion II (CD2)
| No. | Title | Lyrics | Music | Vocals | Length |
|---|---|---|---|---|---|
| 1. | "A Vision" | Neko Oikawa | Toshiyuki Ohmori | Yoko Takahashi | 4:56 |
| 2. | "A Cruel Angel's Thesis (TV Size Version)" | Oikawa | Hidetoshi Satō | Takahashi | 1:33 |
| 3. | "Borderline Case" (A-4) | | | | 2:21 |
| 4. | "A Crystalline Night Sky" (C-6) | | | | 2:22 |
| 5. | "Angel Attack II" (A-7) | | | | 2:00 |
| 6. | "Angel Attack III" (A-9) | | | | 2:25 |
| 7. | "Both of You, Dance Like You Want to Win!" (B-12) | | | | 1:51 |
| 8. | "Waking up in the morning" (C-4) | | | | 1:30 |
| 9. | "Background Music" (A-2) | | | | 1:57 |
| 10. | "A Moment When Tension Breaks" (B-21) | | | | 4:12 |
| 11. | "The Day Tokyo-3 Stood Still" (B-14) | | | | 1:42 |
| 12. | "Spending Time in Preparation" (E-1 Rhythm only) | | | | 2:23 |
| 13. | "She said, 'Don't make others suffer for your personal hatred.'" (A-15) | | | | 1:55 |
| 14. | "Magmadiver" (E-15) | | | | 2:24 |
| 15. | "Pleasure Principle" (E-8) | | | | 3:50 |
| 16. | "The Beast II" (E-16) | | | | 2:19 |
| 17. | "Thanatos" (E-13) | | | | 3:30 |
| 18. | "Rei III" (A-14) | | | | 3:44 |
| 19. | "When I Find Peace of Mind" (B-7) | | | | 3:35 |
| 20. | "Fly Me to the Moon 2020 (Short Size Version)" | Bart Howard | Howard | Takahashi | 1:10 |
| 21. | "Fly Me to the Moon (Rei (#5) TV Size Remix Version)" | Howard | Howard | Megumi Hayashibara | 1:10 |
| 22. | "Fly Me to the Moon (Rei (#6) TV Size Remix Version)" | Howard | Howard | Hayashibara | 1:10 |
| 23. | "Next Episode Preview" (F-2 15-seconds Version) | | | | 0:19 |
| 24. | "Fly Me to the Moon (Aya Bossa Techno Version)" | Howard | Howard | Aya | 3:52 |
| 25. | "Fly Me to the Moon (Aki Jungle version)" | Howard | Howard | Aki | 4:40 |
| 26. | "B-16 Rhythm only" (Misato) | | | | 1:31 |
| 27. | "B-17 Rhythm only" (Asuka Strikes!) | | | | 2:22 |
| Total length: | | | | | 66:43 |

All music is composed by Shirō Sagisu unless specified.

Track listing: Neon Genesis Evangelion III (CD3)
| No. | Title | Lyrics | Music | Vocals | Length |
|---|---|---|---|---|---|
| 1. | "Happiness Is the Smell of Sin" | Neko Oikawa | Toshiyuki Ohmori | Yoko Takahashi | 4:37 |
| 2. | "Eternal Embrace" | Oikawa | Takahashi | Takahashi | 5:26 |
| 3. | "Normal Blood" (E-16 Fast tempo) | | | | 1:58 |
| 4. | "Harbinger of Tragedy" (E-5 Rhythm only/Fast tempo) | | | | 1:39 |
| 5. | "Childhood Memories, Shut Away" (F-3 Take2) | | | | 0:36 |
| 6. | "Those women longed for the touch of others' lips, and thus invited their kisses." (B-4 Strings and piano) | | Bart Howard | | 2:20 |
| 7. | "Background Music II" (A-16 Strings) | | | | 1:34 |
| 8. | "Background Music III" (B-3) | | | | 2:33 |
| 9. | "In the Depths of Human Hearts" (B-2) | | | | 2:23 |
| 10. | "Hostility Restrained" (A-13 C-Type) | | | | 1:38 |
| 11. | "Three of Me, One of Someone Else" (C-55 D-Type) | | | | 2:21 |
| 12. | "Crime of Innocence" (A-13 B-Type) | | | | 2:26 |
| 13. | "The Sorrow of Losing the Object of One's Dependence" (B-4 Piano/Lonely) | | Howard | | 1:33 |
| 14. | "Do You Love Me?" (A-4 Synth voice only) | | | | 2:21 |
| 15. | "Separation Anxiety" (A-13) | | | | 2:28 |
| 16. | "Introjection" (A-12) | | | | 2:27 |
| 17. | "Depression" (A-11) | | | | 2:36 |
| 18. | "Splitting of the Breast" (A-10 Synth voice only) | | | | 2:15 |
| 19. | "Infantile Dependence, Adult Dependency" (B-9) | | | | 3:01 |
| 20. | "Mother Is the First Other" (A-10) | | | | 2:25 |
| 21. | "The Heady Feeling of Freedom" (OP-1 Strings/Slow tempo) | | Hidetoshi Satō | | 1:49 |
| 22. | "Good, or Don't Be." (OP-1 D-Type) | | Satō | | 1:23 |
| 23. | "Fly Me to the Moon (Yoko Takahashi TV Size Version)" | Howard | Howard | Takahashi | 1:10 |
| 24. | "Fly Me to the Moon (4 Beat TV Size Version)" | Howard | Howard | Takahashi | 1:09 |
| 25. | "Fly Me to the Moon (Aya Bossa Techno TV Size Version)" | Howard | Howard | Aya | 1:08 |
| 26. | "Fly Me to the Moon (Yoko Takahashi Acid Bossa TV Size Version)" | Howard | Howard | Takahashi | 1:08 |
| 27. | "Fly Me to the Moon (4 Beat Off Vocal TV Size Version)" | | Howard | | 1:08 |
| 28. | "Fly Me to the Moon (Off Vocal TV Size Version)" | | Howard | | 1:09 |
| 29. | "Fly Me to the Moon (Aki Jungle TV Size Version)" | Howard | Howard | Aki | 1:08 |
| 30. | "Fly Me to the Moon (B-22A Type TV Size Version)" | | Howard | | 1:08 |
| 31. | "Fly Me to the Moon (Rei (#23) TV Size Version)" | Howard | Howard | Megumi Hayashibara | 1:10 |
| 32. | "Fly Me to the Moon (Rei (#25) TV Size Version)" | Howard | Howard | Hayashibara | 1:10 |
| 33. | "Fly Me to the Moon (Rei (#26) TV Size Version)" | Howard | Howard | Hayashibara | 1:12 |
| 34. | "Fly Me to the Moon (Aya London Beat Version)" | Howard | Howard | Aya | 8:16 |
| 35. | "B-20 il tuo sorriso" (Rei II) | | | | 4:32 |
| Total length: | | | | | 77:17 |

All music is composed by Shirō Sagisu except where otherwise noted.

Track listing: Evangelion Death (CD4)
| No. | Title | Lyrics | Music | Vocals | Length |
|---|---|---|---|---|---|
| 1. | "Cello – Fourth Chord Tuning" | | | | 0:26 |
| 2. | "Suiten für Violoncello solo Nr. 1 G-Dur, BWV 1007 1. Vorspiel" | | Johann Sebastian Bach | | 0:43 |
| 3. | "Dvořák: Original Complete Version" | | Antonín Dvořák | | 0:34 |
| 4. | "Violin – Second Chord Tuning" | | | | 0:23 |
| 5. | "Partita III für Violine solo E-Dur, BWV 1006 3. Gavotte en Rondeau" | | Bach | | 0:23 |
| 6. | "Viola – Third Chord Tuning" | | | | 1:10 |
| 7. | "Substitute for Gentleness" (D-7) | | | | 0:26 |
| 8. | "Tears Toward Oneself" (E-13 Short Piece/Fast tempo/With piano) | | | | 2:07 |
| 9. | "Tuning to Imperfection" | | | | 0:19 |
| 10. | "Kanon D-Dur (Quartet)" | | Johann Pachelbel | | 5:00 |
| 11. | "The Sorrow of Losing the Object of One's Dependence II" (B-4 Guitar and piano/Lonely) | | Bart Howard | | 1:35 |
| 12. | "Reliance Leading to Falsehood" (A-4 Violin solo) | | | | 1:48 |
| 13. | "A Fragile Ego Border" (A-4 Different version) | | | | 2:12 |
| 14. | "Kanon D-dur (Strings Orchestra)" | | Pachelbel | | 5:12 |
| 15. | "False Regeneration" (M-7B) | | | | 2:27 |
| 16. | "Soul's Refrain" | Neko Oikawa | Toshiyuki Ohmori | Yoko Takahashi | 5:17 |
| 17. | "Choeur: Jesus demeure ma joie, Consolation et seve de mon coeur" | | Bach | | 3:44 |
| 18. | "Dies Irae [REQUIEM]" | | Giuseppe Verdi | | 37:10 |
| Total length: | | | | | 70:56 |

All music is composed by Shirō Sagisu except where otherwise noted.

Track listing: The End of Evangelion (CD5)
| No. | Title | Lyrics | Music | Vocals | Length |
|---|---|---|---|---|---|
| 1. | "Interference of Others" (M-6 Fast Tempo/Rhythm Only) | | | | 2:21 |
| 2. | "The End of Midsummer" (M-6 Fast Tempo/Modified Version) | | | | 2:24 |
| 3. | "Emergency Evacuation to Regression" (M-4 Chorus only) | | | | 4:18 |
| 4. | "False Regeneration" (M-7B New Mix) | | | | 2:30 |
| 5. | "Substitute Invasion" (E-13 Rhythm only/Modified version) | | | | 3:30 |
| 6. | "II Air [Orchestral Suite No. 3 in D Major, BWV 1068]" | | Bach | | 3:24 |
| 7. | "The Flow of Emptiness" (M-3) | | | | 6:17 |
| 8. | "Thanatos -If I Can't Be Yours- (Note: A vocal and jazz version of Thanatos from Neon Genesis Evangelion II.)" | Mash | Shiro Sagisu | Loren & Mash | 4:53 |
| 9. | "Escape to the Beginning" (M-4) | | | | 5:00 |
| 10. | "Honeymoon with Anxiety" (A-4 Zakazaka version) | | | | 1:40 |
| 11. | "Komm, süsser Tod (M-10 Director's Edit Version)" | Hideaki Anno, Mike Wyzgowski | Sagisu | Arianne Schreiber | 7:46 |
| 12. | "Jesus bleibet meine Freude [Herz und Mund und Tat und Leben, BWV 147]" | | Jan Panenka, Bach, Myra Hess | | 4:50 |
| 13. | "Expansion of Blockade (Note: A part of this record is based on Rei III from the Neon Genesis Evangelion II album.)" (M-9 Modified Version) | | | | 6:54 |
| 14. | "Gap of Dream" (A-4 Piano/Leave It To Version) | | | | 1:34 |
| 15. | "M-9" (Expansion of Blockade Original Version) | | | | 6:52 |
| 16. | "F02 (version 0706)" (Next Episode Preview) | | | | 0:31 |
| Total length: | | | | | 64:44 |

=== Evangelion Finally ===
Evangelion Finally was released by King Records on 7 October 2020 to coincide with the series' 25th anniversary. The original release date, 13 May 2020, was postponed for production reasons. The album was released in a regular edition and a limited special edition. An official booklet containing interviews with Takahashi and Hayashibara was also included in the package. Outside Japan, the album was released in a two-disc edition by Milan Records.

The album featured nine tracks, and six bonus tracks, including a new version of "Fly Me to the Moon" sung by Takahashi and a new arrangement of "Kokoro Yo Genshini Modore". A saxophone was inserted into the first part of "Kokoro Yo Genshini Modore" at Takahashi's suggestion; the chorus of the original version, sung by her brother Gō, was replaced by one sung by Takahashi herself. The song was also used in Espirit Japon, a program broadcast by BS Fuji. The album had a positive commercial response, charting 33 times on the Oricon charts and reaching number 6. The album also peaked in popularity during January and March 2021, coinciding with the release of the last Rebuild installment. In the United States, it debuted at number 111 on the Billboard 200 and number 8 on Top Album Sales with almost 9,000 sales.

Track listing (Note: As listed on the European CD (Milan 19439843152). No writing or vocal credits are given for any tracks except 1–5 and 8, therefore the credits here are taken from the Japanese CD (KICA 2583).)
| No. | Title | Lyrics | Music | Vocal | Length |
|---|---|---|---|---|---|
| 1. | "The Cruel Angel's Thesis" | Neko Oikawa | Hidetoshi Satō | Yoko Takahashi | 4:06 |
| 2. | "FLY ME TO THE MOON (YOKO TAKAHASHI Acid Bossa Version)" | Bart Howard | Howard | Takahashi | 3:50 |
| 3. | "Soul's Refrain" | Oikawa | Toshiyuki Ohmori | Takahashi | 5:12 |
| 4. | "THANATOS -IF I CAN'T BE YOURS-" | Mash | Shirō Sagisu | Loren & Mash | 4:49 |
| 5. | "Komm, süsser Tod (M-10 Director's Edit. Version)" | Hideaki Anno; Mike Wyzgowski | Sagisu | Arianne Schreiber (Note: Credited as "ARIANNE" in liner notes.) | 7:46 |
| 6. | "Kyou no Hi wa Sayounara" | Shōichi Kaneko | Kaneko | Megumi Hayashibara | 2:43 |
| 7. | "Tsubasa wo Kudasai" | Michio Yamagami | Kunihiko Murai | Hayashibara | 4:54 |
| 8. | "FLY ME TO THE MOON 2020" | Howard | Howard | Takahashi | 4:32 |
| 9. | "Kokoro yo Genshi ni Modore 2020" | Oikawa | Satō | Takahashi | 5:09 |
| 10. | "Mugen Houyou" | Oikawa | Takahashi | Takahashi | 5:24 |
| 11. | "Shiawase wa Tsumi no Nioi" | Oikawa | Ohmori | Takahashi | 4:39 |
| 12. | "Come sweet death, second impact" (M-10) | Anno; Wyzgowski; Hayashibara | Sagisu | Hayashibara | 7:10 |
| 13. | "Dilemmatic triangle opera" (B-1) | Hayashibara | Sagisu | Hayashibara | 5:41 |
| 14. | "The Image of black me" (A-1) | Hayashibara | Sagisu | Hayashibara | 7:14 |
| 15. | "Dilemmatic triangle opera AYANAMI Version" (B-1) | Hayashibara | Sagisu | Hayashibara | 5:40 |
| Total length: | | | | | 78:49 |

== Arranged albums ==
=== Evangelion-Vox ===
Evangelion-Vox was released by King Records on 3 December 1997. The album included 20 hip-hop and R&B tracks and remixes recorded by Sagisu after the release of The End of Evangelion. Sagisu rearranged the compositions, incorporating spoken interludes and vocal samples of characters from the series. Several British artists contributed to the album, such as rapper Mali, Loren & Mash, lovers' rock singer Carrol Thompson, Camelle Hinds, vocalist for the soul group Central Line, and an unidentified artist known by the pseudonym The Lord. Outside Japan, it was distributed by Milan Records in 2022. The album received a positive commercial response, appearing 6 times on the Oricon charts and peaking at number 10.

Track listing: Evangelion Vox
| No. | Title | Vocals | Length |
|---|---|---|---|
| 1. | "Evandtroduction" (A-4) | | 2:53 |
| 2. | "The Image of Me-vocalise" (A-1) | Loren | 5:02 |
| 3. | "From My Dreams" (A-4) | Carroll Thompson | 5:34 |
| 4. | "Evangelism" (A-4) | London Gospel Choir | 0:17 |
| 5. | "Can't Get You Outta My Hea" (A-4) | Loren & Mash | 4:33 |
| 6. | "X-plicit" | MALI | 1:26 |
| 7. | "Prelude to Battle" (E-1) | MALI | 4:25 |
| 8. | "Battling" (E-1) | MALI | 4:46 |
| 9. | "interlude-Thanatos" (E-13) | Loren | 0:16 |
| 10. | "Thanatos – If I Can't Be Yours – Jazzy Side Stick-Mix" (E-13) | Loren & Mash | 4:46 |
| 11. | "I'll Be Always on Your Mind (C-5)" (C-5) | Thompson | 5:37 |
| 12. | "Armageddon" | Mali | 4:54 |
| 13. | "Komm, süsser Tod Tumbling Down-Mix (M-10)" (M-10) | Loren & Mash | 6:32 |
| 14. | "Angel Attack" (E-6) | MALI | 3:12 |
| 15. | "UTOPIA" | MALI | 4:56 |
| 16. | "Promised Land – reprise" (F-2) | Camelle Hinds | 1:08 |
| 17. | "'Promised Land' Loren & Mash studio Live" (F-2) | Loren & Mash | 5:02 |
| 18. | "'Star' Loren & Mash studio Live" (F-2) | Loren & Mash | 5:36 |
| 19. | "The Image of Me playback" (A-1) | Loren | 0:30 |
| 20. | "Outro – never shall we return from conflict we must learn" (A-10) | London Gospel Choir | 1:15 |
| Total length: | | | 72:32 |

=== Evangelion Wind Symphony No.1 ===
Evangelion Wind Symphony No.1 was released in Japan on 9 December 2009. The album features the main tracks from the series, rearranged for brass instruments under Sagisu's supervision. The album included a CD-ROM containing PDFs with sheet music of the songs and a booklet with comments, interviews and detailed explanations about the various pieces.

All music is composed by Shirō Sagisu.

Track listing: Evangelion Wind Symphony No.1
| No. | Title | Length |
|---|---|---|
| 1. | "E06_EWS_Amano&kosei" (Angel Attack) | 2:32 |
| 2. | "E03_EWS_Amano&Kosei" (EVA-01) | 2:46 |
| 3. | "C07_EWS_Amano&kosei" (Tokyo-3) | 3:16 |
| 4. | "E01_EWS_Amano&Kosei" (Decisive Battle) | 3:18 |
| 5. | "E06_ReMaster_TV_Original" (Angel Attack) | 2:31 |
| 6. | "E03_ReMaster_TV_Original" (EVA-01) | 2:46 |
| 7. | "E01_ReMaster_TV_Original" (Decisive Battle) | 2:25 |
| 8. | "A01_EWS_Amano&Kosei" (Rei I) | 3:55 |
| 9. | "E01_01_YouichiMurata_Session" (Decisive Battle) | 3:45 |
| 10. | "E01_02_YouichiMurata_Session" (Decisive Battle) | 4:48 |
| 11. | "Shiro'sBrassBand_TributeToBreckerBrothers" | 6:19 |
| 12. | "E01_WithoutEricTrumpet_EWS_Amano&Kosei" (Decisive Battle) | 3:15 |
| Total length: | | 41:36 |

=== Evangelion Wind Symphony No.2 ===
King Records released Evangelion Wind Symphony No.2 on 9 December 2009 simultaneously with the first volume and with the same extra content. On 7 September 2018, songs from the two albums were performed by the Tokyo Kosei Wind Orchestra at the Tokyo Metropolitan Theatre under the direction of Masamichi Amano.

All music is composed by Shirō Sagisu.

Track listing: Evangelion Wind Symphony No.2
| No. | Title | Vocals | Length |
|---|---|---|---|
| 1. | "E09_EWS_Amano&Kosei" (A Step Forward Into Terror) | | 2:14 |
| 2. | "E05_EWS_Amano&Kosei" (EVA-00) | | 2:56 |
| 3. | "E05_Fast_EWS_Amano&Kosei" (The Beast) | | 2:09 |
| 4. | "B12_EWS_Amano&Kosei" (Both of You, Dance Like You Want to Win!) | | 3:02 |
| 5. | "E13_EWS_Amano&Kosei" (Thanatos) | | 4:46 |
| 6. | "E09_ReMaster_TV_Original" (A Step Forward Into Terror) | | 1:55 |
| 7. | "E05_ReMaster_TV_Original" (EVA-00) | | 1:50 |
| 8. | "E05_Fast_ReMaster_TV_Original" (The Beast) | | 1:41 |
| 9. | "E09_YouichiMurata_Session" (A Step Forward Into Terror) | | 3:24 |
| 10. | "F02_Take01_EWS_Amano&Kosei" (Jikai Yokoku) | | 2:14 |
| 11. | "F02_Take02_EWS_Amano&Kosei" (Jikai Yokoku) | | 2:15 |
| 12. | "SuperSaxPlaysEVA_TributeToSuperSax" | Yoko Takahashi | 8:05 |
| 13. | "F02_ReMaster_TV_Original" (Jikai Yokoku) | | 0:36 |
| 14. | "B12_ForPianoPlayback_EWS_Amano&Kosei" (Both of You, Dance Like You Want to Win!) | | 3:01 |
| Total length: | | | 40:08 |

=== Evangelion PianoForte #1 ===
Evangelion PianoForte #1 was released on 23 October 2013. The album included several pieces from the Rebuild soundtrack rearranged for piano and performed under Sagisu's supervision. The cover art, depicting Shinji and Kaworu with a piano as the background, was designed by Takeshi Honda.

All music is composed by Shirō Sagisu.

Track listing: Evangelion PianoForte #1
| No. | Title | Lyrics | Vocals | Length |
|---|---|---|---|---|
| 1. | "E01_matsumoto" (Decisive Battle) | | | 2:21 |
| 2. | "B20_kuriya" (Rei II) | | | 3:29 |
| 3. | "B01_miyagi" (Hedgehog's Dilemma) | | | 3:02 |
| 4. | "E13_kita" (Thanatos) | | | 4:43 |
| 5. | "M10_nakanishi_arianne" (Komm, süsser Tod) | Hideaki Anno, Mike Wyzgowski | Arianne Schreiber | 7:47 |
| 6. | "EM21_matsumoto" (Angel of Doom) | | | 3:52 |
| 7. | "KK_A09_miyagi" (Angel Attack III) | | | 2:46 |
| 8. | "KK_A08_miyagi" (Angel's arrival – quiet and eerie) | | | 2:56 |
| 9. | "KK_A09_alterna_kuriya" (Angel Attack III) | | | 1:51 |
| 10. | "E16_shima" (The Beast II) | | | 3:21 |
| 11. | "Quatre Mains_miyagi_kita" | | | 2:21 |
| 12. | "E05_yamashita" (EVA-00) | | | 4:25 |
| 13. | "M11_shionoya_arianne" (Everything you've ever dreamed) | Anno, Wyzgowski | Arianne | 7:01 |
| 14. | "A01_yamashita_take1" (Rei I) | | | 4:21 |
| 15. | "Quatre Mains_tribute to Rachmaninov_kita" | | | 4:05 |
| 16. | "E05_sasaji" (EVA-00) | | | 6:58 |
| 17. | "A01_clone_miyagi" (Rei I) | | | 3:07 |
| 18. | "F02_miyagi" (Jikai Yokoku) | | | 0:35 |
| Total length: | | | | 69:41 |

=== The world! Evangelion Jazz night =The Tokyo III Jazz club= ===
The world! Evangelion Jazz night =The Tokyo III Jazz club= was released on 24 December 2014. The album contains several jazz arrangements of Sagisu's music and three songs performed and written by Megumi Hayashibara. The album cover was designed by Moyoco Anno, wife of the series' director. The sixth and seventh tracks were released as separate tracks on the CD, but in a later high-resolution edition they were merged into one track. The eighth track, "Dilemmatic Triangle Opera", was supposed to be sung by Hayashibara in Rei Ayanami's tone, but the take was abandoned in the process and instead released on Hayashibara's own Fifty〜Fifty album.

All music is composed by Shirō Sagisu.

Track listing: The world! Evangelion Jazz night =The Tokyo III Jazz club=
| No. | Title | Lyrics | Music | Vocals | Length |
|---|---|---|---|---|---|
| 1. | "Welcome to the Tokyo III jazz club" (Misato〜Jikai Yokoku) | Mike Wyzgowski; Shirō Sagisu | | Ian Michael G Pitter; Lorrain Briscoe aka Loren; Evette Briscoe; Paul Lee; Yoko Takahashi | 6:34 |
| 2. | "Swinging A1" (Rei I) | | | | 5:15 |
| 3. | "Come sweet death, second impact" (Komm, süsser Tod) | Megumi Hayashibara | | Hayashibara | 7:13 |
| 4. | "Barefoot in the club" (Barefoot in the Park) | | | | 5:24 |
| 5. | "A Medley: 'Milestones' and 'The Final Decision We All Must Take'" | | Miles Davis; Shirō Sagisu | | 6:17 |
| 6. | "Emptiness, interlude" | | | | 2:06 |
| 7. | "Emptiness, the longest" | | | | 6:28 |
| 8. | "Dilemmatic triangle opera" (Hedgehog's Dilemma) | Wyzgowski; Hayashibara | | Hayashibara | 5:43 |
| 9. | "A9, mellow slow-jam" (Robe de Champs) | | | | 9:15 |
| 10. | "Theme Q, suppa-duppa!" | | | | 4:58 |
| 11. | "The Image of black me" (Rei I) | Hayashibara | | Hayashibara; Loren | 7:22 |
| 12. | "Weekend, the outro" (Misato) | Wyzgowski; Sagisu | | Ian; Loren; Evette; Paul; Catherine Bott; Deborah Miles-Johnson; Andrew Busher; Michael George | 1:56 |
| 13. | "Fly me to the moon" | | Bart Howard | Ian (MC) | 7:25 |
| Total length: | | | | | 75:56 |

=== ShiroSagisu Outtakes from Evangelion (vol.1) ===
ShiroSagisu Outtakes from Evangelion (Vol.1) was released by King Records on 30 July 2016. The album, produced in honour of the 25th anniversary of Anno and Sagisu's collaboration, which began with the series Nadia, includes previously unreleased tracks by Sagisu and songs used for Japan Animator Expo. Outtakes was released at the same time as Anno's Shin Godzilla soundtrack and sold alongside it. The album included the "Londonderry orchestra+piano" track, originally planned for Evangelion 3.0, a version of "Everything you've ever dreamed" by Arianne based on a version from Evangelion Piano #1 and "1155 twenty-five degrees of frost", first released in 2013 on A.T. EVA HQ-3.0.

All music is composed by Shirō Sagisu.

Track listing: ShiroSagisu Outtakes from Evangelion (vol.1)
| No. | Title | Lyrics | Vocals | Length |
|---|---|---|---|---|
| 1. | "M11 re-arrange and re-mix" (Everything you've ever dreamed) | Hideaki Anno, Mike Wyzgowski | Arianne Schreiber | 6:31 |
| 2. | "M3 complet" (The Flow of Emptiness) | | | 7:03 |
| 3. | "Emptiness and more melody" | | | 3:18 |
| 4. | "Londonderry orchestra+piano" | | | 4:40 |
| 5. | "M5 mix again" (Tragic Choral Music (religious)) | | | 3:45 |
| 6. | "E13 nineteen years after mix" (Thanatos -If I Can't Be Yours-) | Mash | Loren & Mash | 7:00 |
| 7. | "EM21 no choir" (Angel of Doom) | | | 3:49 |
| 8. | "0902 no choir" (The Final Decision We All Must Take) | | | 4:13 |
| 9. | "0948 no choir" (In My Spirit) | | | 3:14 |
| 10. | "Nu02 no choir" (Carnage) | | | 3:26 |
| 11. | "C17 rough demo" (Gods Message) | | | 3:13 |
| 12. | "C16 rough demo" (Dark Defender) | | | 2:55 |
| 13. | "C15 rough demo" (The Anthem) | | | 3:11 |
| 14. | "SS101 alterna02" (L'Apôtre de la Lune) | | | 2:16 |
| 15. | "1120 rough demo" (Gods Gift) | | | 3:25 |
| 16. | "Armageddon proto type" | | | 3:35 |
| 17. | "1155 twenty-five degrees of frost" (Scarred and Battled) | | | 4:40 |
| 18. | "A4 arpa" (Borderline Case) | | | 1:41 |
| 19. | "Auld Lang Syne from the animators" | | | 5:25 |
| 20. | "F02 TV 15sec alterna jazzy" (Jikai Yokoku) | | | 0:19 |
| 21. | "F02 choir+boys" (Jikai Yokoku) | | | 1:06 |
| Total length: | | | | 78:55 |

== Live albums ==
=== Evangelion Symphony ===
Evangelion Symphony (エヴァンゲリオン交響楽, Evangerion Kōkyōgaku) was released by King Records on 22 December 1997. It includes songs from the soundtrack performed by the New Japan Philharmonic Orchestra at the Bunkamura Orchard Hall on 6, 7, 8, 9 and 14 July 1997, prior to the release of The End of Evangelion. The voice cast from the series attended the event; it was recorded and later released on Laserdisc.

All music is composed by Shirō Sagisu unless noted otherwise.

Track listing: Evangelion Symphony (CD1)
| No. | Title | Music | Vocals | Length |
|---|---|---|---|---|
| 1. | "Fourth Movement from Symphony No. 9 in D Minor, Op. 125 'Choral'" (Excerpt)" | Ludwig van Beethoven | | 8:08 |
| 2. | "TOKYO-3" (C-7) | | | 3:39 |
| 3. | "EVA-01" (E-3) | | | 3:41 |
| 4. | "MC-1" | | Miki Nagasawa, Megumi Ogata, Yuko Miyamura | 4:36 |
| 5. | "NERV" (A-3) | | | 2:48 |
| 6. | "Decisive Battle" (E-1) | | | 2:24 |
| 7. | "EVA-00" (E-5) | | | 1:45 |
| 8. | "A Step Forward Into Terror" (E-9) | | | 2:13 |
| 9. | "Rei I" (A-1) | | | 3:38 |
| 10. | "Ritsuko" (C-5) | | | 2:10 |
| 11. | "Rei II" | | | 3:35 |
| 12. | "MC-2" | | Miki Nagasawa, Yuriko Yamaguchi | 3:21 |
| 13. | "I. SHINJI" (A-6) | | | 7:15 |
| Total length: | | | | 49:20 |

Track listing: Evangelion Symphony (CD2)
| No. | Title | Lyrics | Music | Vocals | Length |
|---|---|---|---|---|---|
| 1. | "'Prelude' from Suite for Solo Cello No. 1 in G Major, BWV. 1007" | | Johann Sebastian Bach | | 2:50 |
| 2. | "'Gavotte' from Partita for Solo Violin No. 3 in E Major, BWV. 1006" | | Bach | | 3:28 |
| 3. | "Canon and Gigue in D Major: String Quintet" | | Johann Pachelbel | | 4:03 |
| 4. | "Canon and Gigue in D Major: String Quintet & Rap" | | Pachelbel, Shirō Sagisu | MALI | 5:40 |
| 5. | "Canon and Gigue in D Major: Orchestra" | | Pachelbel | | 6:00 |
| 6. | "Thanatos" (E-13) | | | | 4:42 |
| 7. | "MC-3" | | | Yuko Miyamura, Yuriko Yamaguchi | 3:37 |
| 8. | "Borderline Case" (A-4) | | | | 3:29 |
| 9. | "Mother Is the First Other" (A-10) | | | | 2:34 |
| 10. | "Fly Me to the Moon" | Bart Howard | Howard | Carroll Thompson, Lorrain Briscoe | 9:52 |
| 11. | "MC-4" | | | Megumi Hayashibara, Kotono Mitsuishi | 3:57 |
| 12. | ""Hallelujah" from Messiah" | | George Frideric Handel | | 5:38 |
| 13. | "Untitled (Encore track)" | | | | 11:12 |
| Total length: | | | | | 67:07 |

=== Shin Godzilla vs Evangelion Symphony ===
Shin Godzilla vs Evangelion Symphony was released on 27 December 2017. The album merged the soundtracks of Evangelion and Shin Godzilla, both directed by Anno. The music was performed by the Tokyo Philharmonic Orchestra on 22 and 23 March of that year. The album placed twice on the Oricon charts, placing 44th.

All music is composed by Shirō Sagisu unless noted otherwise.

Track listing: Shin Godzilla vs Evangelion Symphony (CD1)
| No. | Title | Music | Vocals | Length |
|---|---|---|---|---|
| 1. | "Persecution of the Masses (1172)" | | | 5:36 |
| 2. | "メドレー Contre Les Agressions(EM04A)～Showdown(EM05_A)" | | | 4:22 |
| 3. | "Angel of Doom (EM21)" | | | 3:47 |
| 4. | "メドレー Les Bêtes(EM05_B～2EM29_ E5)～Instabilite' orchestre(KK_A08)" | | | 8:29 |
| 5. | "メドレー 11174_rhythm～Black Angels(Fob_10_1211)" | | | 4:18 |
| 6. | "タバ作戦 (Fob_ 01)" | | | 7:21 |
| 7. | "Defeat is no option (1197)" | | | 4:17 |
| 8. | "Who will know OST" | | Yoko Takahashi | 3:26 |
| 9. | "おまけメドレー Early Morning from Tokyo～EM20_alterna01～EM20_alterna03～EM20_alterna04" | | | 4:49 |
| 10. | "伊福部昭トリビュート その1 ゴジラ上陸～ゴジラ復活す～ゴジラ登場" (Music from Godzilla, King Kong vs. Godzilla and Terror of Mechagodzilla) | Akira Ifukube | | 6:51 |
| Total length: | | | | 53:21 |

Track listing: Shin Godzilla vs Evangelion Symphony (CD2)
| No. | Title | Music | Vocals | Length |
|---|---|---|---|---|
| 1. | "The Final Decision We All Must Take (0902)" | | | 4:25 |
| 2. | "メドレー Cruel Dilemme (EM09A)～Des Cordes(KK_C01)" | | | 5:21 |
| 3. | "メドレー Gods Message(C17)～Dark Defender(C16)～The Anthem(C15)" | | | 8:40 |
| 4. | "メドレー It will mean Victory(SD2_ 01)～The Wrath of God in All its Fury(Nu09)" | | | 6:22 |
| 5. | "Under a Burning Sky (11174)" | | | 2:41 |
| 6. | "終局 (Omni_00)" | | | 3:45 |
| 7. | "メドレー Sin From Genesis E16〜EM20～EM10_Q～EM20" | | | 8:46 |
| 8. | "伊福部昭トリビュート その2 宇宙大戦争～ゴジラ・タイトル" (Music from Battle in Outer Space and Godzilla) | Akira Ifukube | | 6:30 |
| 9. | "Who will know – furusato" | | Yoko Takahashi | 4:15 |
| 10. | "残酷な天使のテーゼ～MISATO～次回予告 F02～次回予告 F02（アンコール）" | | Yoko Takahashi | 12:13 |
| Total length: | | | | 1:03:03 |

== Studio albums ==
=== Evangelion Classic 1 – Beethoven: Symphony No.9 "Choral" ===
Evangelion Classic 1 – Beethoven: Symphony No.9 "Choral" (Japanese: エヴァンゲリオン･クラシック➀ ベートーヴェン◎交響曲 第9番 ニ短調 作品125 ｢合唱つき｣, Hepburn: Evangerion Kurasikku 1 – Bētōben: Kōkyōkyokudai dai kyū-ban ni tanchō sakuhin hyakunijūgo 'Gasshō-tsuki') was released on 22 October 1997, then redistributed on 6 November 2013.

Track listing: Evangelion Classic 1 – Beethoven: Symphony No.9 "Choral"'
| No. | Title | Length |
|---|---|---|
| 1. | "1st Movement: Allegro ma non troppo, un poco maestoso" | 15:56 |
| 2. | "2nd Movement: Molto vivace" | 17:14 |
| 3. | "3rd Movement: Adagio molto e cantabile" | 10:56 |
| 4. | "4th Movement: Presto" | 23:04 |
| Total length: | | 66:30 |

=== Evangelion Classic 2 – Verdi: Requiem ===
Evangelion Classic 2 – Verdi: Requiem (Japanese: エヴァンゲリオン･クラシック➁ ヴェルディ◎レクイエム, Hepburn: Evangerion Kurasikku 2 – Verudi: Rekuiemu) was released on 22 October 1997, then redistributed on 6 November 2013.

Track listing: Evangelion Classic 2 – Verdi: Requiem (CD1)
| No. | Title | Length |
|---|---|---|
| 1. | "Requiem" | 7:37 |
| 2. | "Dies irae" | 37:07 |
| Total length: | | 44:44 |

Track listing: Evangelion Classic 2 – Verdi: Requiem (CD2)
| No. | Title | Length |
|---|---|---|
| 1. | "Offertorium" | 10:44 |
| 2. | "Sanctus" | 2:49 |
| 3. | "Agnus Dei" | 4:53 |
| 4. | "Lux aeterna" | 5:55 |
| 5. | "Libera me" | 13:04 |
| Total length: | | 36:05 |

=== Evangelion Classic 3 – George Frideric Händel: Messiah (Complete) ===
Evangelion Classic 3 – George Frideric Händel: Messiah (Complete) (Japanese: エヴァンゲリオン･クラシック➂ ヘンデル◎オラトリオ｢メサイア｣全曲, Hepburn: Evangerion Kurasikku 3 – Handeru: Oratorio 'Mesaia' Zenkyoku) was published on 22 October 1997.

Track listing: Evangelion Classic 3 – George Frideric Händel: Messiah (Complete) (CD1)
| No. | Title | Length |
|---|---|---|
| 1. | "Sinfonia" | 3:07 |
| 2. | "Recitative-Tenor: Comfort ye my people" | 3:49 |
| 3. | "Air-Tenor: Ev'ry valley shall be exalted" | 3:57 |
| 4. | "Chorus: And the glory, the glory of the Lord" | 2:38 |
| 5. | "Recitiative-Bass: Thus sait the Lord" | 1:30 |
| 6. | "Air-Bass: But who may abide" | 4:38 |
| 7. | "Chorus: And He shall purify" | 2:52 |
| 8. | "Recitative-Alto: Behold, a virgin shall conceive" | 0:31 |
| 9. | "Air-Alto & Chorus: O thou that tellest" | 6:15 |
| 10. | "Recitative/Bass: For behold, darkness shall cover the earth" | 1:38 |
| 11. | "Air-Bass: The people that walked in darkness" | 4:25 |
| 12. | "Chorus: For unto us a child is born" | 4:14 |
| 13. | "Pifa: Pastoral Symphony" | 3:43 |
| 14. | "Recitatives-Soprano: There were shepherds; And lo, the Angel of the Lord" | 0:47 |
| 15. | "Recitative-Soprano: And the angel said unto them" | 0:38 |
| 16. | "Recitative-Soprano: And suddenly there was with the angel" | 0:21 |
| 17. | "Chorus: Glory to God in the highest" | 1:40 |
| 18. | "Air-Soprano: Rejoice greatly, o daughter of Zion" | 5:04 |
| 19. | "Recitative-Alto: Then shall the eyes of the blind" | 0:34 |
| 20. | "Duet-Alto & Soprano: And he shall feed his flock" | 5:47 |
| 21. | "Chorus: His yoke is easy" | 2:47 |
| 22. | "Chorus: Behold the Lamb of God" | 3:06 |
| 23. | "Air-Alto: He was despised" | 10:55 |
| Total length: | | 74:56 |

Track listing: Evangelion Classic 3 – George Frideric Händel: Messiah (Complete) (CD2)
| No. | Title | Length |
|---|---|---|
| 1. | "Chorus: Surely he hath borne our grieves" | 3:14 |
| 2. | "Chorus: And with His stripes we are healed" | 1:39 |
| 3. | "Chorus: All we like sheep" | 3:31 |
| 4. | "Recitative-Tenor: All they that see Him" | 0:46 |
| 5. | "Chorus: He trusted in God" | 2:02 |
| 6. | "Recitative-Tenor: Thy rebuke hath broken His heart" | 1:54 |
| 7. | "Air-Tenor: Behold, and see if there be any sorrow" | 1:45 |
| 8. | "Recitative-Tenor: He was cut off out of the land" | 0:23 |
| 9. | "Air-Tenor: But thou didst not leave" | 2:38 |
| 10. | "Chorus: Lift up your heads" | 3:14 |
| 11. | "Recitative-Tenor: Unto which of the angels" | 0:19 |
| 12. | "Chorus: Let all the angels of God worship Him" | 1:18 |
| 13. | "Air-Alto: Thou art gone up on high" | 3:19 |
| 14. | "Chorus: The Lord gave the word" | 1:08 |
| 15. | "Air-Soprano: How beautiful are the feet" | 3:02 |
| 16. | "Chorus: Their sound is gone out" | 1:14 |
| 17. | "Air-Bass: Why do the nations?" | 2:58 |
| 18. | "Chorus: Let us break their bonds asunder" | 1:52 |
| 19. | "Recitative-Tenor: He that dwelleth in heaven" | 0:17 |
| 20. | "Air-Tenor: Thou shalt break them" | 2:16 |
| 21. | "Chorus: Hallelujah" | 3:37 |
| 22. | "Air-Soprano: I know that my Redeemer liveth" | 7:18 |
| 23. | "Chorus: Since by man came death" | 1:58 |
| 24. | "Recitative-Bass: Behold, I tell you a mystery" | 0:43 |
| 25. | "Air-Bass: The trumpet shall sound" | 8:45 |
| 26. | "Recitative-Alto: Then shall be brought to pass" | 0:20 |
| 27. | "Duet-Alto & Tenor: O death, where is thy sting?" | 1:11 |
| 28. | "Chorus: But thanks be to God" | 2:25 |
| 29. | "Air-Soprano: If God be for us" | 5:30 |
| 30. | "Chorus: Worthy is the Lamb...Amen" | 6:41 |
| Total length: | | 77:17 |

=== Evangelion Classic 4 – J.S. Bach: Orchestral Suite No.3 & others ===
Evangelion Classic 4 – J.S. Bach: Orchestral Suite No.3 & others (Japanese: エヴァンゲリオン･クラシック➃ バッハ◎管弦楽組曲第3番｢アリア｣､他, Hepburn: Evangerion Kurasikku 4 – Bahha: Kangengaku kumikyoku dai san-ban 'Aria', hoka) was released on 22 October 1997, and then redistributed on 6 November 2003.

Track listing: Evangelion Classic 4 – J.S. Bach: Orchestral Suite No.3 & others
| No. | Title | Performer | Length |
|---|---|---|---|
| 1. | "Suite No. 1 For Cello Solo In G Major, BWV.1007: Prélude" | André Navarra | 2:42 |
| 2. | "Suite No. 1 For Cello Solo In G Major, BWV.1007: Allemande" | " | 3:49 |
| 3. | "Suite No. 1 For Cello Solo In G Major, BWV.1007: Courente" | " | 2:35 |
| 4. | "Suite No. 1 For Cello Solo In G Major, BWV.1007: Sarabande" | " | 2:44 |
| 5. | "Suite No. 1 For Cello Solo In G Major, BWV.1007: Menuets I and II" | " | 3:15 |
| 6. | "Suite No. 1 For Cello Solo In G Major, BWV.1007: Gigue" | " | 1:46 |
| 7. | "Partita No. 3 For Violin Solo In E Major, BWV.1006: Prélude" | Nejiko Suwa | 4:20 |
| 8. | "Partita No. 3 For Violin Solo In E Major, BWV.1006: Loure" | " | 3:38 |
| 9. | "Partita No. 3 For Violin Solo In E Major, BWV.1006: Gavotte en rondeau" | " | 3:02 |
| 10. | "Partita No. 3 For Violin Solo In E Major, BWV.1006: Menuets I and II" | " | 3:52 |
| 11. | "Partita No. 3 For Violin Solo In E Major, BWV.1006: Bourrée" | " | 1:07 |
| 12. | "Partita No. 3 For Violin Solo In E Major, BWV.1006: Gigue" | " | 1:33 |
| 13. | "Orchestral Suite No. 3 In D Major, BWV.1068: Ouverture" | Sofia Symphony Orchestra | 3:47 |
| 14. | "Orchestral Suite No. 3 In D Major, BWV.1068: Air" | " | 5:27 |
| 15. | "Orchestral Suite No. 3 In D Major, BWV.1068: Gavottes I and II" | " | 2:41 |
| 16. | "Orchestral Suite No. 3 In D Major, BWV.1068: Bourée" | " | 6:20 |
| 17. | "Orchestral Suite No. 3 In D Major, BWV.1068: Gigue" | " | 2:11 |
| 18. | "Jesu, Joy of Man's Desiring: Chorale From Kantata No. 147" | Mari Kumamoto | 3:12 |
| Total length: | | | 53:41 |

=== Refrain: The Songs Were Inspired by Evangelion ===
Refrain: The Songs Were Inspired by Evangelion was released on 6 November 1997 simultaneously with Li-La, Takahashi's sixth album. Takahashi herself sang all of the songs on the album. The album received a positive commercial response, topping the Oricon charts six times and reaching number six. Patrick Gan of Original Sound Version wrote a positive review on the album, praising the track "Kibō no Sora" and the new arrangement of "Shiawase wa Tsumi no Nioi".

Track listing: Refrain: The Songs Were Inspired by Evangelion
| No. | Title | Lyrics | Music | Arranger | Length |
|---|---|---|---|---|---|
| 1. | "Prologue de Refrain" | | Toshiyuki Ohmori | Tony Orly | 2:17 |
| 2. | "A Cruel Angel's Thesis (Ambivalence mix)" | Neko Oikawa | Hidetoshi Satō | Toshiyuki Ohmori | 4:04 |
| 3. | "To the Sky of Hope" | Anisu Kanō | Toshiyuki Ohmori | Toshiyuki Ohmori | 4:51 |
| 4. | "Premonition (Sounds of Reverie mix)" | Neko Oikawa | Toshiyuki Ohmori | Toshiyuki Ohmori | 4:56 |
| 5. | "Happiness is the smell of Sin (Alter Ego mix)" | Neko Oikawa | Toshiyuki Ohmori | Toshiyuki Ohmori | 4:30 |
| 6. | "Fly me to the moon (Touched by the Muse mix)" | Bart Howard | Bart Howard | Toshiyuki Ohmori | 3:58 |
| 7. | "Forbidden Gene" | | Tony Orly | Tony Orly | 5:24 |
| 8. | "Love Antique" | Mamie D. Lee | Toshiyuki Ohmori | Toshiyuki Ohmori | 4:55 |
| 9. | "Heart, return to your origin (Sublimation mix)" | Neko Oikawa | Hidetoshi Satō | Kosmic Bruise | 5:48 |
| 10. | "Eternal Embrace (Return to Dew mix)" | Neko Oikawa | Yoko Takahashi | Toshiyuki Ohmori | 5:23 |
| 11. | "From the dazzling Sea" | Anisu Kanō | Toshiyuki Ohmori | Toshiyuki Ohmori | 5:04 |
| 12. | "Soul's Refrain (Tabris mix)" | Neko Oikawa | Toshiyuki Ohmori | Toshiyuki Ohmori | 5:30 |
| 13. | "Epilogue de These" | | Hidetoshi Satō | Tony Orly | 6:34 |
| 14. | "Fly me to the moon (On the Street)" | Bart Howard | Bart Howard | Toshiyuki Ohmori | 1:29 |
| Total length: | | | | | 64:43 |

=== Evangelion Extreme ===
Evangelion Extreme was released on 22 May 2019. The album featured several songs used for pachinko games dedicated to Evangelion and an unreleased song called "Akaki Tsuki". Special complimentary stickers were also included with the disc. The album included a lyrics booklet published in Japanese and English. Yoshinori Kameda designed the illustration used as the album cover, which had been used in 2013 for the game CR Evangelion 8 (CRヱヴァンゲリヲン8). The new songs were written by Takahashi, who created the pieces while reflecting on Evangelion and its theme of motherhood. Takahashi experimented with elements of EDM and beatbox on the album. The tracks were also used for the game P Evangelion Shito Shinsei (P新世紀エヴァンゲリオン 〜シト、新生〜), released in December 2019.

Track listing: Evangelion Extreme
| No. | Title | Lyrics | Music | Arranger | Length |
|---|---|---|---|---|---|
| 1. | "Red Moon" | Yoko Takahashi | Toshiyuki Ohmori | Toshiyuki Ohmori | 5:09 |
| 2. | "Pray to the Momentary Sky" | Neko Oikawa | Toshiyuki Ohmori | Toshiyuki Ohmori | 4:57 |
| 3. | "Monologue of Sorrow" | Neko Oikawa | Toshiyuki Ohmori | Toshiyuki Ohmori | 4:57 |
| 4. | "A Cruel Angel's Thesis 2009Version" | Neko Oikawa | Hidetoshi Satō | Toshiyuki Ohmori | 4:28 |
| 5. | "Red Moon off vocal ver." | | | | 5:08 |
| Total length: | | | | | 24:39 |

=== Evangelion Infinity ===
Evangelion Infinity is a three-disc album released on 21 July 2021. Outside of Japan, Infinity was released digitally by Milan Records. Several arrangements of classic songs from the soundtrack were included on the album, including a version of "Decisive Battle" used by Anno in Shin Godzilla. The album was originally intended for a double-disc release, but a third was added during production and the catalogue numbers changed accordingly. The album was commercially successful, charting seven times on the Oricon charts and peaking at number fourteen.

Track listing: Evangelion Infinity (CD1)
| No. | Title | Length |
|---|---|---|
| 1. | "Decisive Battle" | 2:26 |
| 2. | "Spending Time in Preparation" | 2:32 |
| 3. | "The Beast II" | 2:21 |
| 4. | "Normal Blood" | 2:00 |
| 5. | "The Longest Day" | 3:02 |
| 6. | "The Longest Day II" | 2:22 |
| 7. | "EM10B Rhythm Main Mix 070820" | 2:23 |
| 8. | "The Longest Day III" | 2:17 |
| 9. | "Strategie "Yashima"" | 2:28 |
| 10. | "Battaille Decisive" | 4:49 |
| 11. | "Sin From Genesis" | 2:46 |
| 12. | "2EM36 rhythm only" | 2:44 |
| 13. | "2EM36 orchestra only" | 2:45 |
| 14. | "Bataille d'Espace" | 3:57 |
| 15. | "Serenity Amongst the Turmoil" | 3:26 |
| 16. | "E01_matsumoto" | 2:22 |
| 17. | "E16_shima" | 3:23 |
| 18. | "euro nerv" | 1:27 |
| 19. | "EM10A alterne" | 2:20 |
| 20. | "EM10A alterne bis" | 1:11 |
| 21. | "EM20 =wunder operation=" | 4:04 |
| 22. | "E-16 normal rhythm" | 2:31 |
| 23. | "E-16 fast rhythm only" | 2:18 |
| 24. | "(secret track)" | 2:24 |
| 25. | "(secret track)" | 2:10 |
| 26. | "(secret track)" | 1:00 |
| 27. | "(secret track)" | 0:58 |

Track listing: Evangelion Infinity (CD2)
| No. | Title | Writer(s) | Length |
|---|---|---|---|
| 1. | "Prelude to battle featuring Mali" | | 4:25 |
| 2. | "Battling featuring Mali" | | 4:47 |
| 3. | "E01_EWS_Amano&Kosei" | | 3:18 |
| 4. | "E01_01_YoichiMurata_Session" | | 3:47 |
| 5. | "E01_02_YoichiMurata_Session" | | 4:50 |
| 6. | "EM20_rhythm_GZM/Soshiki kessei (組織結成)" | | 1:47 |
| 7. | "EM20_Jerry_GZM/Jōhō kyōyo (情報供与)" | | 1:35 |
| 8. | "EM20_Godzilla/Saishidō (再始動)" | | 1:02 |
| 9. | "EM20_CH_alterna_01/Josai tai (巨災対)" | | 0:59 |
| 10. | "EM20_CH_alterna_03/Hōkoku (報告)" | | 1:21 |
| 11. | "EM20_CH_alterna_04/Kyōtō (共闘)" | | 1:15 |
| 12. | "Jerry Long" | Jerry Brown | 7:33 |
| 13. | "Akira Jimbo universe" | | 4:49 |
| 14. | "ch alt1 proto" | | 1:03 |
| 15. | "ch alt3 proto" | | 1:13 |
| 16. | "ch alt4 proto" | | 1:16 |
| 17. | "EM20_alterna01～EM20_alterna03～EM20_alterna04" | | 3:46 |
| 18. | "E01_WithoutEricTrumpet_EWS_Amano&Kosei" | | 3:22 |
| 19. | "Shiro'sBrassBand_TributeToBreckerBrothers" | | 6:14 |

Track listing: Evangelion Infinity (CD3)
| No. | Title | Length |
|---|---|---|
| 1. | "EM20 Kotetsu Voice Orchestra" | 3:02 |
| 2. | "Ttensions featuring Yoko Takahashi" | 3:42 |
| 3. | "Tensions =he who pays the piper=" | 6:29 |
| 4. | "EM20 =clint eastwood=" | 2:04 |
| 5. | "euro nerv optionA =tokyo III and timpani=" | 1:04 |
| 6. | "EM20 =spaghetti western swang=" | 2:34 |
| 7. | "euro nerv optionB =tokyo III and guitars=" | 1:03 |
| 8. | "Can't run away, Face it =EVA oriented Giant Swing= featuring Takanori from LL Brothers" | 4:00 |
| 9. | "EM20 =super chiptune=" | 2:35 |
| 10. | "alterna blueprint Chokkaku guitars" | 5:15 |
| 11. | "a short attention span" | 0:42 |
| 12. | "battle suite 1997" | 9:16 |
| 13. | "EM20 suite 2017" | 9:32 |
| 14. | "all you need is love, Martin..." | 1:42 |
