= Thanatos: If I Can't Be Yours =

1997 song by Loren & Mash

"The End of Evangelion"
- 8-cm CD single cover

Single by Loren & Mash / Arianne

from the album The End of Evangelion
- Language: English
- A-side: "Thanatos: If I Can't Be Yours"
- B-side: "Komm, süsser Tod"; "II Air (Orchestral Suite No. 3 in D major, BWV 1068)"
- Released: August 1, 1997
- Recorded: 1997
- Genre: Anime song
- Label: Starchild (KIDA-155)
- Composer: Shirō Sagisu
- Lyricist: Mash
- Producer: Toshimichi Ōtsuki

"Soul's Refrain / Thanatos: If I Can't Be Yours"
- 12-cm CD single cover

Single by Yōko Takahashi / Loren & Mash
- Language: Japanese; English
- A-side: "Soul's Refrain"; "Thanatos: If I Can't Be Yours"
- B-side: "Kokoro yo Genshi ni Modore"
- Released: May 24, 2006
- Genre: J-pop; Anime song
- Length: 10:04
- Label: Starchild (KICM-3122)
- Composers: Toshiyuki Ōmori ("Soul's Refrain"); Shirō Sagisu ("Thanatos")
- Lyricists: Neko Oikawa ("Soul's Refrain"); Mash ("Thanatos")
- Producer: Toshimichi Ōtsuki

"Thanatos: If I Can't Be Yours" is a song composed and arranged by Shirō Sagisu, with lyrics credited to Mash and vocals performed by Loren & Mash. The song was used in the credits sequence of the animated film The End of Evangelion (1997). Sagisu's London-based musical collaborators, Mike Wyzgowski and Loren, developed an earlier Sagisu composition for the soundtrack of the Neon Genesis Evangelion as a vocal R&B demo; with director Hideaki Anno's approval, Sagisu proceeded to record the song for The End of Evangelion. The title refers to Thanatos, the death drive in Freudian psychoanalytic theory, while commentators have associated the composition and its melancholic character with Rei Ayanami.

King Records released "Thanatos: If I Can't Be Yours" as a single on August 1, 1997, with the title "The End of Evangelion", alongside the film's soundtrack pieces "Komm, süsser Tod" and "Air". The release reached number two on the Oricon Singles Chart and received a platinum certification. Billboard reported that it had sold approximately 600,000 copies in the country, describing the figure as extraordinary for a foreign act in the Japanese market. The song also ranked fourth in the song category of the 1998 Anime Grand Prix conducted by Animage. Critics generally praised the vocal performance, the song's unsettling and mournful atmosphere, and the way it complements the film's themes and soundtrack.

== Background and composition ==
Shirō Sagisu composed and arranged "Thanatos: If I Can't Be Yours", while the official credits attribute the lyrics to Mash and the vocals to Loren & Mash. Sagisu had previously collaborated with director and screenwriter Hideaki Anno on two anime series produced by the animation studio Gainax, Nadia: The Secret of Blue Water and Neon Genesis Evangelion, whose original score he also composed. From 1990 onward, Sagisu increasingly worked in Europe and collaborated with British soul and R&B artists; in 1996, he established the Ro-JAM label and subsequently produced the London-based projects Mash and Loren. Mash originated as a collaboration between Sagisu and British composer and producer Martin Lascelles, with its name combining "Martin" and "Shiro". Lorrain Briscoe, known professionally as Loren, developed her musical background in gospel music and worked as a lead and backing vocalist across genres including gospel, jazz, and pop. Lascelles discovered Loren during a recording session and produced an album with her; Sagisu took an immediate interest in her voice and continued to feature her in his R&B and jazz projects. Mike Wyzgowski also contributed lyrics to their collaborations. The name "Loren & Mash" was chosen to encompass the four-way collaboration. "Thanatos: If I Can't Be Yours" originated from a musical experiment Sagisu was conducting in London, in which he reworked existing background music into R&B. Sagisu initially had no intention of turning "E-13", an instrumental piece he had composed for Neon Genesis Evangelion, into a song. During a spontaneous studio session in London, Sagisu played "E-13" for Wyzgowski and Loren, inspiring them to write and record vocals. After hearing the demo, Anno immediately decided to use the song as the theme for the film The End of Evangelion (1997).

"Thanatos: If I Can't Be Yours" reworked the original background music from the series as UK soul. Lyricist Mike Wyzgowski recalled that Sagisu gave him the melody and a preliminary arrangement for "Thanatos", after which Wyzgowski wrote its lyrics. The song's lyrics centered on the identity of Rei Ayanami, and its bridge features wordless vocal chants by Wyzgowski and Loren. Sagisu recorded "Thanatos: If I Can't Be Yours" in March 1997, while production of The End of Evangelion was underway, in order to preserve the "tension" of the four-month period leading up to the film's completion. As analog recording was still standard in London in 1997, Sagisu recorded only the vocals on a sampler to avoid transporting multitrack recorders and analog tapes to Tokyo. The rhythm section and strings were subsequently recorded during two trips to Tokyo, using a string quintet rather than an orchestra because both Anno and Sagisu favored a more intimate sound to convey the film's "tension". Lascelles programmed the arrangement in London, but after recording was completed, Sagisu spent several additional days rearranging the song himself, replacing the jazz instrumentation and adding samples. During its production, Sagisu attempted to convey his image of Evangelion character Rei Ayanami to Wyzgowski, describing her as "like an android, but a little different", which reportedly left Wyzgowski even more confused. In addition to "Thanatos: If I Can't Be Yours", Sagisu also composed the film's other theme song, "Komm, süsser Tod". Sagisu regarded both the pieces as songs that presented a new direction for anime music. He explained that anime songs had traditionally drawn from Japanese popular and idol music, with less interchange with Western pop. For the two songs, Sagisu discarded those conventions and pursued a different approach, which he linked to Hideaki Anno's eclecticism and the increasing diversity of anime music during the 1990s. The song accompanied the closing credits at the end of the film's first segment, "Air". A society named Omnibus Japan designed the credit sequence, arranging the text in a double-helix pattern that unfolds throughout the sequence.

The song's melody draws from an eponymous piece from the television series, which appears in the episodes "Introjection" and "Rei III" in scenes that involve Rei Ayanami. Justin Wu of The Artifice noted its use during a scene in which Rei attempts to destroy herself along with her mecha, Eva-00. The composition takes its name from Sigmund Freud's concept of Thanatos, the destructive human death drive, which in turn takes its name from the personification of death in Greek mythology. Freudian psychoanalytic theory places Thanatos in opposition to Eros, the life drive, and also refers to the two impulses as destrudo and libido, respectively. The series had previously invoked these concepts when protagonist Shinji Ikari merges with his mecha, Eva-01, and is absorbed into it in the episode "Weaving a Story 2: oral stage". Critics and official materials have identified the conflict between the life and death drives as a part of Shinji's struggle throughout the series and The End of Evangelion. Writers Kazuhisa Fujie and Martin Foster further argued that both "Thanatos: If I Can't Be Yours" and "Komm, süsser Tod" exemplify the importance of the death drive to the film's narrative. Bamboo Dong of Anime News Network compared the song's sound to the music of His and Her Circumstances. Devin Meenan of Comic Book Resources noted the contrast between the song's "jazzy acoustics" and its melancholic lyrics, which he interpreted as expressing the uncertainty and self-doubt of unfulfilled love. He regarded this juxtaposition of upbeat music and sorrowful lyrics as characteristic of the music of Evangelion. Meenan also interpreted the song as referring to Rei Ayanami, arguing that its lyrics reflect her growing awareness of her nature and her feelings for Shinji, which her circumstances prevent her from resolving in a mutually fulfilling relationship.

== Release and other versions ==
King Records released "Thanatos: If I Can't Be Yours" as a single by Loren & Mash on August 1, 1997, under the catalog number KIDA-155 and the name "The End of Evangelion". The single also contains "Komm, süsser Tod" and "II Air", an arrangement of the second movement of Johann Sebastian Bach's Orchestral Suite No. 3 in D major, BWV 1068. The single's cover features a computer-generated artwork by designer Norihiko Netsu. On May 24, 2006, King Records issued "Thanatos: If I Can't Be Yours" again on a joint single with Yōko Takahashi's "Soul's Refrain". The release, catalogued as KICM-3122, pairs the original recording with a new version titled "Thanatos: If I Can't Be Yours – Nine Years After Mix". King Records also included the song as the eighth track on The End of Evangelion, the film's soundtrack album. The label released the album on September 26, 1997, under the catalog number KICA-370. "Thanatos: If I Can't Be Yours" later appeared on Neon Genesis Evangelion: S² Works, released on December 4, 1998; Evangelion: The Day of Second Impact, released on September 13, 2000; Evangelion: The Birthday of Rei Ayanami, released on March 30, 2001; Refrain of Evangelion, released on July 24, 2003; and Neon Genesis Evangelion Decade, released on October 26, 2005. A remastered version appeared on the A.T. EVA01 Reference CD, released on December 20, 2007. King Records later included the song on both Neon Genesis Evangelion Soundtrack 25th Anniversary Box and Evangelion Finally, releasing both albums on October 7, 2020.

A remix titled "Thanatos: If I Can't Be Yours (Jazzy Side Stick-Mix)" appeared on the album Evangelion-Vox, released on December 3, 1997, and containing hip-hop and R&B remakes of Sagisu's music. Mash produced the remix, with Sagisu handling synthesizer and drum programming. The arrangement features Makoto Kuriya on electric piano, Yoshinobu Takeshita on acoustic bass and a string section, while Loren performed lead and backing vocals and Mike Wyzgowski provided additional backing vocals. The album also includes a separate track titled "Interlude-Thanatos (E-13)", also credited to Wyzgowski and Loren. The song was subsequently reworked as "Thanatos (Nyqi Turntable Opara)" for Loren, Mash, Hazel, Desire, an album released on June 26, 1998. King Records described the album as the culmination of Sagisu's European work during the 1990s, encompassing material developed through his activities in Paris and London and his formation of Mash with Martin Lascelles. Sagisu also included four reinterpretations of the song on his album Shiro's Songbook, titled "Thanatos: If I Can't Be Yours Part 1: Piano & Verse", "Part 2: Orchestral World", "Part 3: Funk & Go", and "Part 4: Overcome". The musical theme of the second part of "E-13", not previously used for "If I Can't Be Yours", was used to write "Overcome", another vocal song. King Records released the album on November 3, 1999. Another remix later appeared on Sagisu's Shiro's Songbook "Remixes and More", released on June 21, 2000. Sagisu revisited the "Nine Years After Mix" for Shiro Sagisu Outtakes from Evangelion (Vol. 1), released on July 30, 2016, with the title "E13 nineteen years after mix". He later included the original version on his four-disc compilation Anison Roku Plus, which King Records released on August 29, 2018.

In 2006, King Records included "Thanatos: If I Can't Be Yours" on the Neon Genesis Evangelion Music DVD, a collection edited by series assistant director Masayuki that synchronized songs from the Neon Genesis Evangelion franchise with selected footage from the Evangelion anime. A "Thanatos: If I Can't Be Yours" video by Masayuki using footage from the Evangelion anime was also included in the music clip collection released as bonus material with the 2015 Neon Genesis Evangelion Blu-ray Box and the 2019 Standard Edition. The 2021 international Ultimate Edition Blu-ray release also featured the video.

== Reception ==
In the 1998 Anime Grand Prix, a large annual popularity poll conducted by the anime magazine Animage, "Thanatos: If I Can't Be Yours" ranked fourth in the anime-song category. Tiffani Nadeau of Mania.com praised Loren and Mash's rendition of "Thanatos: If I Can't Be Yours", describing its performance as "vocal perfection". She also felt that the song and "Komm, süsser Tod" complemented the soundtrack's instrumental pieces and suited the album's overall theme. Anime News Network's Bamboo Dong called "Thanatos: If I Can't Be Yours" the "best Evangelion song ever", while describing its sound as "freaking creepy". Scott Green of Ain't It Cool News described "Thanatos: If I Can't Be Yours" and "Komm, süsser Tod" as "unforgettable mournful vocals" that evoke the film's trauma and melancholy, considering the two songs alone worth owning the soundtrack.

== Chart and commercial performance ==
On Billboard's Japanese singles chart, "Thanatos: If I Can't Be Yours" debuted at number three on August 11, 1997, and fell to number six the following week. It reached number thirteen by September 1 and remained within the top twenty throughout the month, moving between numbers thirteen and sixteen before declining to number nineteen on September 22 and number twenty on September 29. A May 1998 article by Steve McClure in Billboard reported that the single had sold approximately 600,000 copies in Japan, describing the figure as extraordinary for a foreign act in the country. In November 1999, Yomiuri Shimbun reported that "Thanatos: If I Can't Be Yours" had sold over 900,000 copies. On the Oricon Singles Chart, the original 1997 single peaked at number two and remained on the chart for thirteen weeks. The Recording Industry Association of Japan (RIAJ) certified "Thanatos: If I Can't Be Yours" platinum in August 1997. The 2006 reissue, released as a split single with "Soul's Refrain", reached number 39 and charted for six weeks. Following the release of Evangelion: 3.0+1.0 Thrice Upon a Time in March 2021, "Thanatos: If I Can't Be Yours" ranked seventh on the Japanese Spotify Weekly Viral Top 50 for the week of March 4–10. During the following week, March 11–17, it remained in the top ten at number eight. The song remained in the chart's top ten for a third consecutive week, ranking ninth for March 18–24.

== Live performances and covers ==
Makoto Kuriya, who worked with Sagisu on Evangelion-Vox, recorded a jazz arrangement of "Thanatos: If I Can't Be Yours" for his album Antitheses, which King Records released on August 21, 1998. Kuriya conceived the album as a collection of anime themes arranged as jazz standards. He played piano on "Thanatos", accompanied by Koichi Osamu on bass and Masahiko Osaka on drums; the musicians recorded the track in Tokyo on June 10, 1998. King Records later reissued the album on September 16, 2015. In 2009, Swedish producer Rasmus Faber's project Platina Jazz included a cover of "Thanatos: If I Can't Be Yours" on the album Platina Jazz: Anime Standards Vol. 1. Music Natalie described the project as reinterpreting anime songs as club jazz, with arrangements performed by European jazz musicians. "Thanatos: If I Can't Be Yours" also featured in the program of the Anime & Game Symphony Japan World Tour 2021 concert at Suntory Hall in Tokyo on February 27, 2021. Kenichi Shimura conducted the Nihonbashi Symphony Orchestra and the Seto Philharmonic Orchestra for the concert.

== Track listing and versions ==
1997 single track listing
No.	Title	Lyrics	Music	Arrangement	Length
1.	"Thanatos: If I Can't Be Yours"	Mash	Shirō Sagisu	Sagisu	4:53
2.	"Komm, süsser Tod"	Hideaki Anno (original lyrics), Mike Wyzgowski (English translation)	Sagisu	Sagisu	7:56
3.	"II Air" (Orchestral Suite No. 3 in D major, BWV 1068)		Johann Sebastian Bach	Sagisu	3:23
Total length:					16:12

2006 re-issue single track listing
No.	Title	Lyrics	Music	Arrangement	Length
1.	"Soul's Refrain" (魂のルフラン)	Neko Oikawa	Toshiyuki Ōmori	Ōmori	5:14
2.	"Thanatos: If I Can't Be Yours"	Mash	Shirō Sagisu	Sagisu	4:50
3.	"Kokoro yo Genshi ni Modore" (心よ原始に戻れ)	Oikawa	Hidetoshi Sato	Ōmori	4:50
4.	"Thanatos: If I Can't Be Yours" (Nine Years After mix)	Mash	Sagisu	Sagisu	8:20
5.	"Soul's Refrain" (off vocal version)				5:11
Total length:					28:25

== Charts ==
=== Weekly charts ===
Weekly chart performance for "Thanatos: If I Can't Be Yours"
Chart (1997)	Peak position
Japan (Oricon)	2

Weekly chart performance for "Soul's Refrain / Thanatos: If I Can't Be Yours"
Chart (2006)	Peak position
Japan (Oricon)	39

=== Year-end charts ===
Year-end chart performance for "Thanatos: If I Can't Be Yours"
Chart (1997)	Position
Japan (Oricon)	55

== Certifications ==
Sales certification for "Thanatos: If I Can't Be Yours"
Region	Certification	Certified units/sales
Japan (RIAJ) (Physical)	Platinum	400,000^{^}
^{*} Sales figures based on certification alone.^{^} Shipments figures based on certification alone.
