= Kokoro yo Genshi ni Modore =

1997 song by Yōko Takahashi

- Cover of the 1997 single "Soul's Refrain", on which the song appeared as the B-side

Song by Yōko Takahashi
- Language: Japanese
- Released: February 21, 1997
- Genre: J-pop; anime song
- Length: 4:52
- Label: Starchild
- Composer: Hidetoshi Satō
- Lyricist: Neko Oikawa

Yūko Miyamura version
- Cover of Yūko Miyamura's 2012 single "Kokoro yo Genshi ni Modore ~2012 Version~"

"Kokoro yo Genshi ni Modore" (Japanese: 心よ原始に戻れ) is a song performed by Japanese singer Yōko Takahashi. Hidetoshi Satō composed the song, Toshiyuki Ōmori arranged it, and Neko Oikawa wrote the lyrics. The production team commissioned it alongside "Soul's Refrain" as a prospective theme for the animated film Neon Genesis Evangelion: Death and Rebirth (1997). Oikawa wrote both songs after watching the Neon Genesis Evangelion episode "Rei III"; while she developed "Soul's Refrain" around reincarnation, she conceived "Kokoro yo Genshi ni Modore" around the origin and awakening of life, giving the two songs related themes. King Records first issued the song on February 21, 1997, as the coupling track of Takahashi's "Soul's Refrain" single.

"Kokoro yo Genshi ni Modore" subsequently received several new arrangements and cover versions. Takahashi recorded later versions including "Kokoro yo Genshi ni Modore 2020", while Megumi Hayashibara, the Japanese voice actress for Rei Ayanami, and Yūko Miyamura, the voice actress for Asuka Langley Soryu, recorded their own versions. Critics praised the song's expansive musical character, lyrics, and Takahashi's vocals, while later reviews highlighted the rhythmic arrangement and performances of the 2020 version. The original release with "Soul's Refrain" reached number three on the Oricon Singles Chart and remained on the chart for twenty-one weeks; Miyamura's 2012 cover also entered the Oricon and Billboard Japan singles charts.

== Background and recording ==
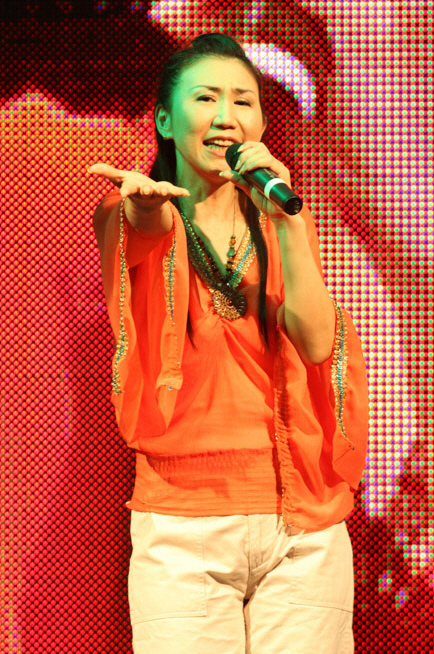
Singer Yōko Takahashi during a live performance at Japan International Contents Festival in São Paulo in 2010

"Kokoro yo Genshi ni Modore" originated from plans for a theatrical film developed after the conclusion of the Neon Genesis Evangelion television series. The production team considered "Kokoro yo Genshi ni Modore" and "Soul's Refrain" as prospective theme songs for the film Neon Genesis Evangelion: Death and Rebirth (1997), and had yet to decide which composition would serve as the film's theme during the recording process. Hidetoshi Satō composed "Kokoro yo Genshi ni Modore", while Toshiyuki Ōmori arranged it. Ōmori also composed "Soul's Refrain", and arranged both songs. He approached both songs with the same commitment, stating that he intended to make each one the best it could be regardless of which the production ultimately selected. Singer Yōko Takahashi praised Ōmori's professionalism during the sessions. She recalled that, although he had composed "Soul's Refrain", he "put more heart and soul into 'Kokoro yo Genshi ni Modore'". She said that witnessing his approach influenced her own attitude toward recording, leading her to perform every song "with all my heart". Ōmori had previously composed and arranged the television series' opening theme, "A Cruel Angel's Thesis".

Neko Oikawa, who wrote the lyrics for "A Cruel Angel's Thesis", also wrote the lyrics for "Kokoro yo Genshi ni Modore". At the time, she still had little familiarity with Evangelion. For the former song, she had only skimmed an Evangelion project proposal document and watched footage of two episodes on fast-forward. For "Kokoro yo Genshi ni Modore" and "Soul's Refrain" producer Toshimichi Ōtsuki similarly gave Oikawa just demos of both compositions and a videotape containing a single episode, "Rei III", in which Rei Ayanami dies and returns to life. The production team had yet to decide which of the two songs would serve as the film's theme. Ōtsuki instructed Oikawa simply to write whatever the episode brought to mind. Oikawa developed the two songs around related but distinct concepts inspired by the same footage. Rei's death and return to life led her to base "Soul's Refrain" on reincarnation, while for "Kokoro yo Genshi ni Modore" she sought to depict the origin of life. She consequently centered the latter on life awaiting the moment of its awakening, and wrote its lyrics alongside those of "Soul's Refrain"; the two songs therefore share similar themes.

Yōko Takahashi became involved with Neon Genesis Evangelion after returning from six months of musical study in Los Angeles. She had known composer and arranger Toshiyuki Ōmori since before her professional debut and regarded him as a longtime mentor. Through Ōmori and his connections, she was approached to participate in a project featuring different singers performing the anime's ending theme, "Fly Me to the Moon". After her record label approved the collaboration, producer Toshimichi Ōtsuki invited her to sing the series' opening theme as well. Takahashi described "Kokoro yo Genshi ni Modore" as "a very difficult song", recalling that its original arrangement "could only be sung by two people". She explained that Ōmori subsequently adapted the vocal arrangement to incorporate a chorus, allowing her to sing the lead part alone. Takahashi recalled that the lyrics for the recording arrived by fax on the day of the session. Staff then copied the lyrics by hand onto the sheet music before Takahashi recorded the vocals. Takahashi later described the process as leaving her little time to prepare, as she had to sing almost immediately after the staff had written the newly arrived lyrics into the score. She also recalled approaching the sessions with the intention of delivering both songs at the highest possible standard. Takahashi herself commented: "The recording took place while everyone was striving to make the best work possible. Including 'Kokoro yo Genshi ni Modore', which we recorded at the same time, I sang even more professionally than before so that either song could be chosen as the theme song". Takahashi learned that the filmmakers had chosen "Soul's Refrain" only after watching the finished film in a theater. Kazuya Tsurumaki, assistant director of the television series and director of the film's Rebirth segment, later recalled recommending "Soul's Refrain" over "Kokoro yo Genshi ni Modore" to chief director Hideaki Anno.

== Release and other versions ==
"Kokoro yo Genshi ni Modore" appeared as the B-side of Yōko Takahashi's "Soul's Refrain" single, which King Records issued on 8-cm CD on February 21, 1997. The release also included an instrumental version of "Kokoro yo Genshi ni Modore" titled "Off Vocal Version". First-edition copies came with an original Cardass Masters trading card from Japanese toy and entertainment company Bandai's Cardass collectible card line. The song later appeared on the 2005 compilation Neon Genesis Evangelion: Decade, released on October 26. In May 2006, King Records included it on the CD single "Soul's Refrain / Thanatos: If I Can't Be Yours", which paired Takahashi's "Soul's Refrain" with Loren and Mash's "Thanatos: If I Can't Be Yours". In September 2019, the official Evangelion app Eva-Extra featured the song in the first of a series of special music selections for a limited-time project commemorating the anniversary of the television series' first broadcast. The selection identified it as the coupling track of the "Soul's Refrain" single and featured it alongside seven tracks from the Neon Genesis Evangelion soundtrack albums and the audio drama "Shūkyoku no Tsuzuki".

Yōko Takahashi's 1997 album ~refrain~ The songs were inspired by "Evangelion", released on November 6, 1997, featured a new version of the song named "Sublimation Mix". Takahashi performed the track, while Kozmic Bruise arranged it. Megumi Hayashibara, the original Japanese voice actress for Rei Ayanami, recorded her own rendition, "Kokoro yo Genshi ni Modore (Naked Flower Version)", for her album Irāvatī. In January 2012, voice actress Yūko Miyamura, who voices Asuka Langley in the Evangelion franchise, released a cover titled "Kokoro yo Genshi ni Modore ~2012 Version~". The recording served as the theme song for CR Evangelion 7, the seventh installment in the CR Evangelion pachinko series, and played as background music during jackpot sequences. Animate Times noted a sense of youthful innocence in Miyamura's rendition, which the publication characterized as a distinctly Asuka-like interpretation of the song.

The 2020 compilation Evangelion Finally featured a new version named "Kokoro yo Genshi ni Modore 2020". Five years later, Evangelion Flashback featured the same version; King Records released the album on October 29, 2025, for the series' 30th anniversary. In February 2026, King Records included "Kokoro yo Genshi ni Modore 2020" on the "Soul's Refrain" Evangelion 30th Anniversary Edition LP, offering limited-edition colored-vinyl and standard pressings. Takahashi recorded new vocals for "Kokoro yo Genshi ni Modore 2020", which also received a new arrangement. The producer proposed updating the song to reflect the musical context of 2020, leading Takahashi and Ōmori to rework its tempo, sound and arrangement with contemporary audiences and live performances in mind. Takahashi requested an opening saxophone solo and invited saxophonist Hiroshi Matsushita to perform it. The team lowered the tempo and reduced the instrumentation, producing a calmer sound with a stronger groove. The original melody had left insufficient space for the singer to breathe, prompting Ōmori to divide the chorus into alternating lead and chorus parts; Takahashi performed both parts herself for the 2020 recording. She stated that its rhythm encouraged audience participation and call-and-response interaction during live performances. The 2020 version also served as the ending theme for the October and November 2020 broadcasts of the BS Fuji television program Esprit Japon.

== Reception ==
Animate Times praised the song's introductory violin for conveying a grand sense of scale, and noted how its lyrics, with references to life, repentance, lost children and the laws of nature that evoke the story of Evangelion, blend with Takahashi's powerful vocals. Banzai similarly characterized "Kokoro yo Genshi ni Modore" and "Soul's Refrain" as distinguished by enveloping lyrics and a grand musical style. Reviewing a 2023 performance of the 2020 version, Barks described Takahashi's vocals as polished and noted the interplay between the song's four-on-the-floor rhythm and Matsushita's saxophone, which the publication credited with creating its groove. A 2025 concert report by Inside characterized Takahashi's vocals on "Kokoro yo Genshi ni Modore 2020" as both powerful and poignant.

== Chart and commercial performance ==
The single pairing "Kokoro yo Genshi ni Modore" with "Soul's Refrain" debuted and peaked at number 3 on the Oricon Singles Chart, selling 141,880 copies in its first week. It remained on the chart for twenty-one weeks and accumulated reported sales of 631,320 copies. On the Japanese singles chart published in Billboard's "Hits of the World", it debuted at number nine on March 3, 1997, fell to number twelve the following week, and then moved through numbers ten and eleven on March 17 and 24, respectively. The single returned to number nine at the end of March, held that position for another week, and reached its peak of number eight on April 14. It then declined to numbers sixteen and eighteen over the next two weeks, briefly re-entering the chart at number twenty on May 19.

The Recording Industry Association of Japan certified the single pairing "Kokoro yo Genshi ni Modore" with "Soul's Refrain" platinum in March 1997. Yūko Miyamura's "Kokoro yo Genshi ni Modore ~2012 Version~" placed sixth on the anime music sales ranking of Tower Records' Shinjuku store for the week of January 9–15, 2012. It peaked at number 34 on the Oricon Singles Chart and remained in the ranking for six weeks. The single also debuted and peaked at number 36 on the Billboard Japan Top Singles Sales chart. It remained there for four consecutive weeks, ranking 57th, 75th, and 96th over the following three. Its final appearance was in the week dated February 13. The 2026 "Soul's Refrain" Evangelion 30th Anniversary Edition LP, which included "Kokoro yo Genshi ni Modore 2020", also debuted and peaked at number 28 on the Oricon Albums Chart, selling an estimated 1,443 copies in its first week and remaining in the top 300 of Oricon's weekly albums chart for four weeks.

== Live performances ==
In July 2020, Yōko Takahashi debuted "Kokoro yo Genshi ni Modore 2020" during Anime Expo Lite × LisAni! Live L.A., a special online edition of the Japanese anime music festival LisAni! Live held as part of the virtual Anime Expo event. On June 5, 2021, Takahashi held her first solo streaming concert, Yoko Takahashi Special Live [Refrain], at Nissin Foods Power Station Reboot. "Kokoro yo Genshi ni Modore 2020" was the third song in the set, with saxophonist Hiroshi Matsushita joining Takahashi as a guest and introducing the performance with a saxophone solo. The following March, she included "Kokoro yo Genshi ni Modore 2020" in her three-song Evangelion set at the Precious Anime & Game Song Festival at Toyosu PIT in Tokyo, performing it between "Soul's Refrain" and "A Cruel Angel's Thesis".

On May 28, 2023, Takahashi held Yoko Takahashi Evangelion ultimate Live "Tsukitoya" at Zepp Shinjuku in Tokyo, her first solo concert devoted entirely to Evangelion music. She sang "Kokoro yo Genshi ni Modore 2020" as the second song of the concert accompanied by Matsushita, who performed a solo before the song and played saxophone throughout it. In August 2025, she included the song in her set during the Evangelion 30th Anniversary Special Live at Anime NYC, a major New York convention dedicated to anime and Japanese popular culture. On February 22, 2026, Takahashi appeared in the Evangelion Flashback special live during Evangelion:30+; 30th Anniversary of Evangelion, a three-day festival held at Yokohama Arena to commemorate the franchise's 30th anniversary. "Kokoro yo Genshi ni Modore 2020" was the fifth song in her set, followed by "Mugen Hōyō" and "Soul's Refrain".

== Track listing and versions ==
1997 single track listing
No.	Title	Lyrics	Music	Arrangement	Length
1.	"Soul's Refrain" (魂のルフラン)	Neko Oikawa	Toshiyuki Ōmori	Ōmori	5:14
2.	"Kokoro yo Genshi ni Modore" (心よ原始に戻れ, lit. 'Heart, Return to Your Origin')	Oikawa	Hidetoshi Sato	Ōmori	4:52
3.	"Soul's Refrain" (off vocal version)				5:12
4.	"Kokoro yo Genshi ni Modore" (off vocal version)				4:49
Total length:					20:08

Yūko Miyamura – Kokoro yo Genshi ni Modore ~2012 Version~
No.	Title	Length
1.	"Kokoro yo Genshi ni Modore ~2012 Version~" (心よ原始に戻れ～2012 version～)	4:40
2.	"Shiawase no Betsumei" (幸せの別名)	4:58
3.	"Kokoro yo Genshi ni Modore ~2012 Version~" (off vocal version)	4:39
4.	"Shiawase no Betsumei" (off vocal version)	4:56
Total length:		19:15

== Charts ==
=== Weekly charts ===
Weekly chart performance for the original 1997 release
Chart (1997)	Peak position
Japan (Oricon)	3

Weekly chart performance for Yūko Miyamura's "Kokoro yo Genshi ni Modore ~2012 Version~"
Chart (2012)	Peak position
Japan (Oricon)	34
Japan Top Singles Sales (Billboard Japan)	36

=== Year-end charts ===
Year-end chart performance for the original 1997 release
Chart (1997)	Position
Japan (Oricon)	41

== Certifications ==
Region	Certification	Certified units/sales
Japan (RIAJ)	Platinum	400,000^{^}
^{^} Shipments figures based on certification alone.

== Notes ==
=== Bibliography ===
- Oikawa, Neko (July 20, 2018). ネコの手も貸したい 及川眠子流作詞術 [I Want to Lend Even a Cat's Paw: Neko Oikawa's Style of Songwriting] (in Japanese). Rittor Music. ISBN 978-4-8456-3267-1.
