= Li-La =

Studio album by Yoko Takahashi
- Released: 6 November 1997
- Genre: J-pop
- Length: 46:38
- Label: Kitty Enterprises
- Producer: Shigenobu Karube

Yoko Takahashi chronology
Living with Joy (1996)	Li-La (1997)	BEST PIECES II (1999)

Singles from Living with Joy
- 1. "Zankoku na Tenshi no Thesis" Released: October 25, 1995; 2. "Tamashii no Refrain" Released: February 21, 1997

Li-La is the sixth album from Yoko Takahashi.

== Track listing ==
No.	Title	Length
1.	"A Cruel Angel's Thesis" (Harmonia version)	5:13
2.	"Love Is a Rose"	5:56
3.	"Ware ga Kokoro no Maria" (我が心のマリア Maria of My Heart)	3:44
4.	"Soul's Refrain" (Erato version)	5:49
5.	"Inochi no Tane no You ni" (命の種のように Lifeform)	5:38
6.	"Ame no Koi" (雨の恋 Rain Love)	1:23
7.	"Sing Bird"	3:49
8.	"Noel"	6:03
9.	"Fly Me to the Moon"	4:27
10.	"Li-La"	4:36
