= Irāvatī =

Studio album by Megumi Hayashibara

Studio album by Megumi Hayashibara
- Released: August 6, 1997
- Genre: J-pop
- Length: 66.37
- Label: King Records
- Producer: Toshimichi Ohtsuki

Megumi Hayashibara chronology
bertemu (1996)	Irāvatī (1997)	Fuwari (1999)

Irāvatī is the ninth studio album by Megumi Hayashibara. The album was released in two editions, a regular edition and a limited edition with cardboard sleeve and hardcover photobook. It has also been reissued on at least one occasion. The album reached #5 on the Oricon weekly charts and charted for 8 weeks, selling 277,060 copies. This is her best selling album to date.

== Track listing ==
No.	Title	Lyrics	Music	Length
1.	"Good Luck!"	Ritsuko Okazaki	Okazaki
2.	"I'll Be There" (Ballade version)	Megumi	Hidetoshi Sato
3.	"Successful Mission"	Megumi	Sato
4.	"Soul's Refrain" (魂のルフラン) (Aqua Groove mix)	Neko Oikawa	Toshiyuki O'mori
5.	"Déjà Vu"	Megumi	Sato
6.	"The Gift"	Seishi Lee; Mamie D. Lee	O'mori
7.	"Run All the Way!" (Fire Ball Groove mix)	Satomi Arimori	O'mori
8.	"Just Be Conscious"	Megumi	Sato
9.	"Kokoro yo Genshi ni Modore" (心よ原始に戻れ) (Naked Flower version)	Oikawa	Sato
10.	"Ashita ni Nare" (明日になれ)	Megumi	Shinkichi Mitsumune
11.	"Reflection"	Megumi	Sato
12.	"Thirty"	Megumi	Megumi
13.	"Māyā" (幻影)	Megumi	Megumi Maruo
