= Komm, süsser Tod (Arianne song) =

- Cover of the "The End of Evangelion" single, featuring "Thanatos: If I Can't Be Yours" as the A-side

Song by Arianne

from the album The End of Evangelion
- Language: English
- Released: August 1, 1997
- Recorded: 1997
- Genre: Anime song
- Label: Starchild (KIDA-155)
- Composer: Shirō Sagisu
- Lyricists: Hideaki Anno (original Japanese lyrics); Mike Wyzgowski (English lyrics)

"Komm, süsser Tod" is a song composed and arranged by Shirō Sagisu, with English lyrics by Mike Wyzgowski and vocals performed by Arianne. Director Hideaki Anno wrote the original Japanese lyrics, which Wyzgowski adapted into English for the finished recording. The song was used during the Human Instrumentality scene in the animated film The End of Evangelion (1997), accompanying the apocalyptic sequence in which humanity merges into a single existence. Sagisu conceived its musical arrangement around a deliberate contrast between the song's upbeat sound and the sorrowful character of Anno's lyrics, combining piano, strings, guitar, and gospel vocals. Commentators have similarly noted the contrast between its cheerful sound and themes of guilt, self-loathing, interpersonal pain, and self-annihilation, interpreting the song in relation to the Freudian concept of Thanatos, or destrudo, and as a reflection of Shinji Ikari's psychological state during Human Instrumentality.

King Records first released "Komm, süsser Tod" on August 1, 1997, as the second track of the single "Thanatos: If I Can't Be Yours", issued under the title "The End of Evangelion". The single reached number two on the Oricon Singles Chart, receiving a platinum certification from the Recording Industry Association of Japan. King Records subsequently included the song on The End of Evangelion and numerous Evangelion compilation albums. Sagisu and other musicians have produced several rearrangements and cover versions, including recordings by Megumi Hayashibara, Megumi Ogata, and Mili. Following the release of Evangelion: 3.0+1.0 Thrice Upon a Time in 2021, the Director's Edit version reached number one on Spotify's Japanese Weekly Viral Top 50. Critics have praised the song's juxtaposition with the film's disturbing imagery and frequently described both the song and its accompanying sequence as among the most memorable elements of The End of Evangelion.

== Background and composition ==
Shirō Sagisu is a Japanese composer and music producer who had previously collaborated with director Hideaki Anno on the television series Nadia: The Secret of Blue Water (1990–1991). Anno subsequently selected Sagisu to compose the music for Neon Genesis Evangelion, and their collaboration continued with the 1997 film The End of Evangelion. For the film, Sagisu composed both "Komm, süsser Tod" and "Everything You've Ever Dreamed"; the latter was conceived as an alternative possibility alongside "Komm, süsser Tod" before the latter was ultimately used in the film. In the final version of The End of Evangelion, the soundtrack features two English-language songs: "Thanatos: If I Can't Be Yours", used during the film's credits sequence, and "Komm, süsser Tod", which accompanies Human Instrumentality, an apocalyptic event in which humanity merges into a single, complete existence. Sagisu recalled recording the song in March 1997 and preparing two versions of the song's latter section, one with vocals and one without. Anno had initially requested a choir; Sagisu chose the London Community Gospel Choir, drawing on the repeated refrains characteristic of gospel music. Sagisu himself regarded both "Thanatos" and "Komm, süsser Tod" as songs that marked a new direction for anime music. He explained that anime songs had traditionally drawn from Japanese popular and idol music, with limited interchange with Western pop. For the two songs, Sagisu discarded those conventions and pursued a different approach, which he linked to Hideaki Anno's eclecticism and the increasing diversity of anime music during the 1990s.

Hideaki Anno wrote the song's original lyrics in Japanese, while Mike Wyzgowski subsequently wrote the English lyrics for the finished recording. Anno's original text adopts the perspective of a speaker overwhelmed by anxiety and self-loathing, who fears both rejection and harm from others, but fears even more inflicting pain on the people he loves. Convinced that emotional intimacy inevitably results in suffering, the speaker rejects love and turns his destructive impulses inward. The lyrics ultimately present self-annihilation and a "return to nothingness" as an escape from interpersonal pain: by entering a state without other people, the speaker imagines a place free from emotional uncertainty and the possibility of being hurt. According to Wyzgowski, Sagisu generally provided him with a brief outline or keywords and otherwise allowed him to develop the lyrics independently. Wyzgowski did not contribute to the song's musical style, attributing its slide guitar, choir and extended closing section entirely to Sagisu; his production involvement extended only to occasional lyrical changes that Sagisu requested during studio sessions. South African singer Arianne Schreiber, credited mononymously as Arianne, performed the song. Schreiber moved to London around 1992 and, according to Shirō Sagisu, began preparing for a solo debut with producer Lenny Franchi after attracting the attention of George Michael. Wyzgowski similarly recalled meeting Schreiber while she recorded demo material, shortly after Michael signed her to his record label.

In November 1996, while Sagisu searched in London for a vocalist for "Komm, süsser Tod", Franchi introduced him to Schreiber. Schreiber traveled with Sagisu to Japan in January 1997, where she spent four days in Tokyo and recorded the vocals for "Komm, süsser Tod" and "Everything You've Ever Dreamed" at a King Records studio. In a costly mishap, which Sagisu recalls as typical for the Evangelion project, Schreiber and Sagisu's flight was severely delayed, leaving session musicians, already booked for their arrival, sitting idle all day. Sagisu returned to London to record the choir and orchestra for both songs, as well as handclaps for "Komm, süsser Tod"; Anno then requested an exact number of individual handclaps, requiring booking another studio for a second take. Because London studios were then not equipped for digital multitrack recordings, which were standard in Japanese studios, Sagisu was limited to a portable digital 8-track recorder for these sessions. Even with recording concluded by February, in July, Anno suddenly requested that the song end with a piano melody symbolizing Asuka's final line in the movie. Sagisu, by now working daily on Evangelion Symphony, quickly added this piano part himself, resulting in the "Director's Edit" as heard in the film and on the soundtrack.

== Music and lyrics ==
Gospel choir section
Komm, süsser Tod
A 25-second excerpt illustrating the song's use of the London Community Gospel Choir and layered choral arrangement.

A Neon Genesis Evangelion soundtrack booklet noted that Shirō Sagisu's arrangement for "Komm, süsser Tod" begins with a piano introduction, followed by flowing strings that gradually heighten the song's emotional effect. The liner notes from the Refrain of Evangelion album also described "Komm, süsser Tod" as deliberately contrasting its rhythmic arrangement with the "heartrending sorrow" of Anno's lyrics, and compared this approach to Mobile Suit Gundam III: Encounters in Space (1982), which similarly used a song written by its chief director during a crucial scene near the end of the film. Sagisu himself highlighted the ascending and descending movement of the string arrangement. He cited the Instrumentality sequence as an example of what he called the "unplanned harmonies" that frequently emerged between music and imagery in Neon Genesis Evangelion, which he believed could simultaneously exhibit both correspondence and contrast between sound and picture. Sagisu also attempted to rotate the guitar sound of "Komm, süsser Tod" across all surround channels. Anno asked him to compose the piece so that every element, from the harmonic progressions to the instrumental layering, would match the onscreen imagery.

SoraNews24 reporter and musician Seiji Nakazawa characterized the original version of "Komm, süsser Tod" as having a "joyous U.K. rock feel". During its latter half, a gospel choir gradually enters the arrangement, with the overlapping voices accompanying the film as it approaches its climax. Gabriella Botello of Fandango Latam compared the song's combination of grand piano and acoustic guitar to the Beatles' "Hey Jude", noting that its initially cheerful sound builds toward a more psychedelic climax near the end. SlashFilm's Devin Meenan interpreted "Komm, süsser Tod" as giving voice to Shinji's desire to die as Human Instrumentality begins, reading Instrumentality as an allegory for suicide. Nicolo Manaloto of Epicstream noted the "sharp contrast" between the song's upbeat sound and the unsettling imagery of the Third Impact, and considered its lyrics an encapsulation of Shinji's feelings and story. He interpreted the lyrics' sadness, guilt, and self-loathing as reflections of Shinji's emotional state, while reading the phrase "tumbling down" as a reference both to his emotions and to the events of the Third Impact. Sage Ashford of Comic Book Resources similarly noted the contrast between the song's upbeat sound and its despairing lyrics, which express regret, self-reproach and a desire for death. Max Covill of Polygon connected the use of "Komm, süsser Tod" over "disturbing crayon drawings" to Anno's earlier experimentation with avant-garde techniques in Gunbuster. Writers Kazuhisa Fujie and Martin Foster further linked both "Thanatos: If I Can’t Be Yours" and "Komm, süsser Tod" to the Freudian concept of Thanatos, or destrudo—the death drive, an impulse toward self-dissolution, destruction, and ultimately the death of oneself and others. Critics and official materials identified the conflict between the life and death drives as central to Shinji's struggle throughout the series and The End of Evangelion.

== Release ==
King Records released "Komm, süsser Tod" on August 1, 1997, as the second track on the single "Thanatos: If I Can't Be Yours", issued under the catalog number KIDA-155 and the name "The End of Evangelion". The single also contains its title track and "II Air", an arrangement of the second movement of Johann Sebastian Bach's Orchestral Suite No. 3 in D major, BWV 1068. The single's cover features a computer-generated artwork by designer Norihiko Netsu. King Records also included the song on The End of Evangelion, the film's soundtrack album, as the tenth track under the title "Komm, süsser Tod (M-10 Director's Edit. Version)". The label released the album on September 26, 1997, under the catalog number KICA-370. Both the original and Director's Edit versions of "Komm, süsser Tod" later appeared on Neon Genesis Evangelion: S² Works, released on December 4, 1998; the Director's Edit version subsequently appeared on Evangelion: The Day of Second Impact, released on September 13, 2000. The song was later included on the album Refrain of Evangelion, released on July 24, 2003, and Neon Genesis Evangelion Decade, released on October 26, 2005. The A.T. EVA01 Reference CD, released on December 20, 2007, featured a remastered version. King Records later included the song on both Neon Genesis Evangelion Soundtrack 25th Anniversary Box and Evangelion Finally, both released on October 7, 2020.

A remix titled "Komm, süsser Tod – Tumbling Down-Mix (M-10)" appeared as the thirteenth track on Evangelion-Vox, released on December 3, 1997, an album featuring hip-hop and R&B reinterpretations of Sagisu's music. Produced by Mash, the version features Loren on lead and backing vocals, the London Gospel Choir on backing vocals, Shirō Sagisu on synthesizer and drum programming, Yasuharu Nakanishi on Hammond organ, and Yoshinobu Takeshita on acoustic bass. On October 23, 2013, King Records released Evangelion PianoForte #1, the first piano concept album in the Evangelion franchise, with Shirō Sagisu as producer, under the catalog number KICA-3216. The album includes "M10_nakanishi_arianne", a version of "Komm, süsser Tod", as its fifth track. For the track, Sagisu extracted the piano and vocal parts from the original recording, leaving only Yasuharu Nakanishi's piano, Arianne's lead vocals, and the London Community Gospel Choir's backing vocals.

In 2018, for Anison Roku Plus (titled Shiro's Ani-Songbook in English), a four-disc compilation commemorating Sagisu's 40th anniversary in the music industry and collecting 73 anime-related tracks from his career, Sagisu selected the earlier mix of "Komm, süsser Tod" without piano outro. It appears as the fifth track on the third disc. King Records released the collection on August 29, 2018. For the 30th anniversary of Neon Genesis Evangelion, Sagisu produced two albums titled The White Album 1 – Evangelion 30th Anniversary and The White Album 2 – Evangelion 30th Anniversary. Limited-edition vinyl releases accompanied the Evangelion:30+; 30th Anniversary of Evangelion event at Yokohama Arena on February 21, 2026, while Ro-Jam Records Japan released the albums digitally on March 25. The White Album 1 includes "Come, Sweet Death (WYZ version)", which Wyzgowski arranged and performed, as its seventh track. The White Album 2 includes "Come, Sweet Death oldskool", with Joy Farrukh on vocals, as its second track; Sagisu arranged and produced the version and handled its programming. Sagisu described "Come, Sweet Death oldskool" as a more compact and intimate band arrangement than the original recording. He also connected the song's musical conception to religious influences, citing the use of a gospel choir in the original "Komm, süsser Tod" and associating that element with the Protestant culture he encountered while living in Europe.

== Reception ==
Tiffani Nadeau of Mania singled out "Komm, süsser Tod" and "Thanatos: If I Can't Be Yours" as the soundtrack's two "notably moving" English-language songs, praising Arianne as a "beautiful singer" and calling both vocal tracks "perfectly suited" to the instrumentals and the album's overall theme. Anime critic Vrai Kaiser of Anime Feminist regarded the "Komm, süsser Tod" sequence as "one of the most memorable and beautiful sequences in anime". Timothy Lee of Geeks of Color called "Komm, süsser Tod" "iconic" and wrote that its use during the Human Instrumentality sequence heightens the scene's "horrifying" effect. Anime News Network's Nick Creamer similarly described the song as "iconic", writing that it gives the end of the world a "gentle, familiar cadence" and a sense of "rightness and purpose"; he also ranked the song and its accompanying sequence among anime's "most iconic" moments. Scott Green of Ain't It Cool News described "Thanatos: If I Can't Be Yours" and "Komm, süsser Tod" as "unforgettable mournful vocals" that evoke the film's trauma and melancholy, and considered the two songs alone worth owning the soundtrack.

== Chart and commercial performance ==
"Komm, süsser Tod" appeared on the 1997 single "Thanatos: If I Can't Be Yours". The single debuted at number three on Billboard's Japanese singles chart on August 11, 1997, and fell to number six the following week. It reached number thirteen by September 1 and remained within the top twenty throughout the month, moving between numbers thirteen and sixteen before declining to number nineteen on September 22 and number twenty on September 29. Writing in May 1998, Steve McClure reported in Billboard that the single had sold approximately 600,000 copies in Japan, describing the figure as extraordinary for a foreign act in the country. In November 1999, Yomiuri Shimbun reported that sales had surpassed 900,000 copies. On the Oricon Singles Chart, the original 1997 single peaked at number two and remained on the chart for thirteen weeks. The Recording Industry Association of Japan (RIAJ) certified the single platinum in August 1997. Following the release of Evangelion: 3.0+1.0 Thrice Upon a Time in March 2021, the M-10 Director's Edit Version of "Komm, süsser Tod" reached number one on the Japanese Spotify Weekly Viral Top 50 for the week of March 11–17. The following week, March 18–24, it ranked second.

== Live performances and covers ==
On December 24, 2014, King Records released The world! Evangelion Jazz night =The Tokyo III Jazz club=, the first official jazz arrangement album for the Evangelion series, which Shirō Sagisu produced and arranged. The album includes a Japanese-language version of "Komm, süsser Tod" titled "Come sweet death, second impact", performed by Megumi Hayashibara, the voice actress of Rei Ayanami, who also wrote its Japanese lyrics. King Records issued the album under the catalog number KICA-3219. Hayashibara later included "Come sweet death, second impact" on her fourteenth studio album, Fifty~Fifty. King Records released the album on March 30, 2018, with the song appearing as its second track. Megumi Ogata, the Japanese voice actress of Shinji Ikari, covered "Komm, süsser Tod" for her 2017 anime-song cover album Animeg. 25th. Katsuhiko Kurosu arranged Ogata's version of the song. In an interview with LisAni!, Ogata described the song as difficult to reinterpret and praised Kurosu for preserving its atmosphere in his arrangement. She also explained that the gospel group VOJA-tension provided backing vocals to add greater depth to the arrangement. Ogata chose to perform the song as Shinji, saying that its lyrics about "returning to nothingness" reflected the character's state of mind at that point in the story.

On October 12, 2016, Japanese music group Mili released a cover of "Komm, süsser Tod" on their second studio album, Miracle Milk. The song appears as the album's eighteenth and final listed track; the band released the album under the catalog number SIHT-1004. On August 31, 2018, May'n performed "Komm, süsser Tod" with Loren and Yōko Takahashi during an event celebrating Shirō Sagisu's 40th anniversary as a composer. The Seto Philharmonic Symphony Orchestra subsequently performed the song at its 34th subscription concert, conducted by Kenichi Shimura at Sunport Hall Takamatsu on January 17, 2021. Sagisu also created a new arrangement of "Komm, süsser Tod", which premiered publicly at the Back to Neon Genesis concert in Osaka on March 28, 2026. SoraNews24 reporter Seiji Nakazawa described the arrangement as having a Baroque feel and considered it so different from the original that it sounded "like an entirely different song". Sagisu said that he incorporated "playful touches" into the arrangement and regarded provoking a reaction and discussion among listeners as the most rewarding aspect of rearranging a song. He also explained that, since Back to Neon Genesis focused on the 1995 Evangelion television series while "Komm, süsser Tod" originated in the 1997 film, incorporating the song into the concert allowed him to surprise the audience. In a separate interview, Sagisu explained that Baroque music originally embodied an irregular and avant-garde approach characterized by improvisation and experimentation; when revisiting the idea of the "new century" envisioned during the 1990s, he sought to look further back to the freedom of Baroque music from two or three centuries earlier.

== Track listing and versions ==
1997 single track listing
| No. | Title | Lyrics | Music | Arrangement | Length |
|---|---|---|---|---|---|
| 1. | "Thanatos: If I Can't Be Yours" | Mash | Shirō Sagisu | Sagisu | 4:53 |
| 2. | "Komm, süsser Tod" | Hideaki Anno (original lyrics), Mike Wyzgowski (English translation) | Sagisu | Sagisu | 7:56 |
| 3. | "II Air" (Orchestral Suite No. 3 in D major, BWV 1068) | | Johann Sebastian Bach | Sagisu | 3:23 |
| Total length: | | | | | 16:12 |

== Charts ==
=== Weekly charts ===
Weekly chart performance for the 1997 single
| Chart (1997) | Peak position |
|---|---|
| Japan (Oricon) | 2 |

=== Year-end charts ===
Year-end chart performance for the 1997 single
| Chart (1997) | Position |
|---|---|
| Japan (Oricon) | 55 |

== Certifications ==
Sales certification for the 1997 single containing "Komm, süsser Tod"
| Region | Certification | Certified units/sales |
|---|---|---|
| Japan (RIAJ) (Physical) | Platinum | 400,000^{^} |
^{*} Sales figures based on certification alone.^{^} Shipments figures based on certification alone.

== Notes ==
=== Bibliography ===
- 新世紀エヴァンゲリオン交響楽 [Symphony of Evangelion] (Media notes) (in Japanese). King Records. 1997.
- Fujie, Kazuhisa; Foster, Martin (2004). Neon Genesis Evangelion: The Unofficial Guide. United States: DH Publishing, Inc. ISBN 0-9745961-4-0.
