= Kizu Darake no Yume =

Single by Yoko Takahashi
- B-side: "Fantasy"
- Released: August 27, 2008
- Genre: J-pop
- Label: Columbia Records

Yoko Takahashi singles chronology
"Seinaru Itami wo Idaite" (2008)	"Kizu Darake no Yume" (2008)

"Kizu Darake no Yume" (傷だらけの夢) is Yoko Takahashi's 24th single produced by Columbia Records. It was released on August 27, 2008. Since it reached #174 in the Oricon weekly charts and currently sold a total of 473 copies, it is Yoko's worst selling single to date. The title track was used as the opening theme for the OVA Cobra The Animation.

== Track listing ==
1. Kizu Darake no Yume—4:01
2. Fantasy—4:50
3. Kizu Darake (Instrumental)
4. Fantasy (Instrumental)
