= Kugatsu no Sotsugyō =

Studio album by Yoko Takahashi
- Released: 25 August 1993
- Genre: J-pop
- Length: 53:45
- Label: Kitty Records
- Producer: Hidenori Taga

Yoko Takahashi chronology
Pizzicato (1992)	Kugatsu no Sotsugyō (1993)	Watashi wo Mitsukete (1994)

Singles from Kugatsu no Sotsugyō
- 1. "Blue no Tsubasa" Released: July 14, 1993

Kugatsu no Sotsugyō is the second album from Yoko Takahashi, including the hit single Blue no Tsubasa, which reached #66 in the Oricon weekly charts, while the album reached #85 and charted for two weeks.

== Track listing ==
No.	Title	Length
1.	"San-nin Happy End" (３人ハッピーエンド Three Happy Ending)	5:37
2.	"Family"	6:15
3.	"Nemurenai Yoru wa Tameiki ga Odoru" (眠れない夜はため息が踊る Sleepless Night Sigh is Dance)	4:39
4.	"Hane Makura" (羽根枕 Pillows)	4:33
5.	"Tatoe Subete o Nakushitemo" (例え全てを失くしても)	5:11
6.	"Yurameite" (ゆらめいて Flickering)	4:01
7.	"Inoru (Hallelujah)" (祈夜（ハレルヤ） Night Prayer (Hallelujah))	2:29
8.	"Blue no Tsubasa" (ブルーの翼 Blue Wings)	5:52
9.	"Little Bird"	4:55
10.	"Kugatsu no Sotsugyō" (９月の卒業 September Graduation)	5:33
11.	"Minna Oyasumi" (みんなおやすみ Good Night Everybody)	4:40
