= Pizzicato (album) =

Studio album by Yoko Takahashi
- Released: 21 October 1992
- Genre: J-pop
- Length: 50:39
- Label: Kitty Records
- Producer: Hidenori Taga

Yoko Takahashi chronology
Pizzicato (1992)	Kugatsu no Sotsugyō (1993)

Singles from Pizzicato
- 1. "Okaeri" Released: October 09, 1991; 2. "P.S. I Miss You" Released: December 11, 1991; 3. "Mou Ichido Aitakute" Released: June 03, 1992; 4. "Woman's Love" Released: September 23, 1992

Pizzicato is the first album from Yoko Takahashi, including the hit single Mou Ichido Aitakute, which reached #38 in the Oricon weekly charts, while the album reached #75 and charted for two weeks.

== Track listing ==
No.	Title	Lyrics	Music	Arranger	Length
1.	"Magic Kiss"	Yoko Takahashi	PAROME	PAROME	5:01
2.	"Mou Ichido Aitakute" (もう一度逢いたくて I Miss You Again)	Shota Namikawa	Shota Namikawa	PAROME	3:24
3.	"Something in the Air"	Yoko Takahashi	PAROME	PAROME	5:33
4.	"One Heart to Love"	Yoko Takahashi	Toshinobu Kubota	PAROME	5:02
5.	"P.S. I Miss You"	Miyu Yuzuki	Hiroya Watanabe	PAROME	4:48
6.	"Okaeri" (おかえり Welcome back)	Yumi Morita	Chika Ueda	Tatsuo Kato	4:34
7.	"Loving You"	Minnie Riperton; Richard Rudolph	Minnie Riperton; Richard Rudolph	Banana	4:52
8.	"Maboroshi no Haru ~ Nobara" (幻の春～野薔薇 Spring Wild Rose ~ Phantom)	Shoko Ema	Yoko Takahashi	PAROME	2:29
9.	"Nemurenu Yoru ni" (眠れぬ夜に Sleepless Nights)	Reiko Okabe	Fumitaka Anzai	Fumitaka Anzai	4:45
10.	"Woman's Love"	Goro Matsui	PAROME	PAROME	4:41
11.	"Pizzicato" (ピチカート)	Yoko Takahashi	Toshiro Yabuki	PAROME	5:30
Total length:					50:39
