= Watashi o Mitsukete =

Studio album by Yoko Takahashi
- Released: 26 November 1994
- Genre: J-pop
- Length: 53:03
- Label: Kitty Records
- Producer: Hidenori Taga

Yoko Takahashi chronology
Kugatsu no Sotsugyō (1993)	Watashi o Mitsukete (1994)	Best Pieces (1996)

Singles from Watashi wo Mitsukete
- 1. "$1,000,000 no Koi" Released: July 25, 1994; 2. "Ano Koro ni Machi Awase You" Released: October 26, 1994; 3. "Moonlight Epicurian" Released: December 19, 1994

Watashi o Mitsukete (Japanese: 私をみつけて; lit. 'Find Me') is the third album by Yoko Takahashi, released on November 26, 1994.

== Track listing ==
No.	Title	Length
1.	"Taiyō ni Dakarete" (太陽に抱かれて Warm Sun)	3:53
2.	"$1,000,000 no Koi" (＄１，０００，０００の恋 Love of $1,000,000)	4:22
3.	"Moonlight Epicurian" (ムーンライト・エピキュリアン)	5:04
4.	"Ano Koro ni Machi Awaseyō" (あの頃に待ち合わせよう)	5:19
5.	"Kamisama no Itazura" (神様のいたずら Playful God)	4:06
6.	"Non Non Lover"	4:46
7.	"Chikyū no Oka de Dance o Shimashō" (地球の丘でダンスをしましょう Let's Dance in the Hills of the Earth)	2:17
8.	"Watashi o Mitsukete" (私をみつけて Find Me)	7:36
9.	"Mirai ga Natsukashii" (未来がなつかしい Nostalgic Future)	4:58
10.	"Namida ga Koboreru" (涙がこぼれる Tears Spill)	6:24
11.	"Akai Yume" (浅い夢 Shallows Dreams)	4:16
