= Best Pieces =

BEST PIECES

Studio album by Yoko Takahashi
- Released: 25 January 1996
- Genre: J-pop
- Length: 72:29
- Label: Kitty Enterprises
- Producer: Mitsuo Takaku

Yoko Takahashi chronology
Watashi wo Mitsukete (1994)	BEST PIECES (1996)	Living with Joy (1996)

BEST PIECES is the first best-album from Yoko Takahashi, including the hit single Zankoku na Tenshi no Thesis and many others. The album reached #65 in the Oricon weekly charts and charted for four weeks.

== Track listing ==
No.	Title	Length
1.	"Inoru (Hallelujah)" (祈夜（ハレルヤ） Night Prayer (Hallelujah))	2:29
2.	"Moonlight Epicurian" (ムーンライト・エピキュリアン)	5:04
3.	"Ano Koro ni Machi Awase You" (あの頃に待ち合わせよう)	5:19
4.	"Kyuugatsu no Sotsugyou" (９月の卒業 September Graduation)	5:33
5.	"Mou Ichido Aitakute" (もう一度逢いたくて I Miss You Again)	3:24
6.	"Okaeri" (おかえり Welcome back)	4:34
7.	"Something in the Air"	5:33
8.	"P.S. I Miss You"	4:48
9.	"Blue no Tsubasa" (ブルーの翼 Blue Wings)	5:52
10.	"$1,000,000 no Koi" (＄１，０００，０００の恋 Love of $1,000,000)	4:22
11.	"Nemurenu Yoru ni" (眠れぬ夜に Sleepless Nights)	4:45
12.	"Zankoku na Tenshi no Thesis (Version '96)" (残酷な天使のテーゼ Cruel Angel's Thesis)	5:04
13.	"Watashi wo Mitsukete" (私をみつけて Find Me)	7:36
14.	"Little Bird"	4:55
15.	"Oboete Imasu ka" (憶えていますか Do you remember?)	3:11
