= Soul's Refrain =

1997 single by Yōko Takahashi

- 8-cm CD single cover

Single by Yōko Takahashi
- Language: Japanese
- B-side: "Kokoro yo Genshi ni Modore"
- Released: February 21, 1997
- Recorded: January 12, 1997
- Genre: J-pop; anime song
- Length: 5:15
- Label: Starchild
- Composer: Toshiyuki Ōmori
- Lyricist: Neko Oikawa
- Producers: Toshiyuki Ōmori; Toshimichi Ōtsuki (exec.)

Yōko Takahashi singles chronology
"Atarashii Shirt" (1996)	"Soul's Refrain" (1997)	"We're the One" (1999)

Alternative cover
- 12-cm CD single cover (2006)

Audio
- "Soul's Refrain" on YouTube

"Soul's Refrain" (Japanese: 魂のルフラン, Hepburn: Tamashī no Rufuran) is a song performed by Japanese singer Yōko Takahashi. Toshiyuki Ōmori composed and arranged the song, while Neko Oikawa wrote the lyrics. King Records released it as a single on February 21, 1997, and the production team used it during the closing sequence of the animated film Neon Genesis Evangelion: Death and Rebirth (1997). Oikawa based the lyrics on the Neon Genesis Evangelion episode "Rei III", connecting Rei Ayanami's death and subsequent return through another clone with the concept of reincarnation.

"Soul's Refrain" reached number three on the Oricon Singles Chart and became one of the best-known songs associated with the Evangelion franchise. Critics praised its melody, Oikawa's lyrics, and the way its music and themes complement the world of the series. The song later appeared in Evangelion-themed pachinko machines and received numerous cover versions.

== Background and recording ==
Japanese singer Yōko Takahashi performed "A Cruel Angel's Thesis", the opening theme of the Neon Genesis Evangelion television series, recording it before she knew the series' story or other details about the production. After the television series ended and plans for a theatrical film emerged, Takahashi was asked to perform its theme song, "Soul's Refrain". The production team initially planned the film Neon Genesis Evangelion: Death and Rebirth (1997) to conclude the series, with the segment Rebirth presenting an entirely new final story. As the project expanded, they postponed the conclusion to a later film, The End of Evangelion (1997), and ended Rebirth at the beginning of the confrontation between Asuka Langley Soryu's Eva-02 and the Eva Series, followed by "Soul's Refrain" over the closing sequence. The completed version of the segment, titled "Air" in The End of Evangelion, extends the story beyond Rebirth's former endpoint, so the film omits "Soul's Refrain" from the sequence. The production team considered two songs for the film's theme, "Soul's Refrain" and "Kokoro yo Genshi ni Modore". Toshiyuki Ōmori composed "Soul's Refrain", while Hidetoshi Satō composed "Kokoro yo Genshi ni Modore", with Ōmori arranging both tracks. Ōmori approached both songs with the same commitment, stating that he intended to make each one the best it could be regardless of which one would ultimately be selected. Ōmori had previously arranged "A Cruel Angel's Thesis", which also featured lyrics by Neko Oikawa.

Yōko Takahashi became involved with Neon Genesis Evangelion after returning from six months of musical study in Los Angeles. She had known composer and arranger Toshiyuki Ōmori since before her professional debut and regarded him as a longtime mentor. Through Ōmori and his connections, she was approached to participate in a project featuring different singers performing the anime's ending theme, "Fly Me to the Moon". After her record label approved the collaboration, producer Toshimichi Ōtsuki invited her to sing the series' opening theme as well. Takahashi then recorded "Soul's Refrain" on January 12, 1997. Staff received the lyrics by fax at the recording studio and copied them by hand onto the sheet music before Takahashi recorded the vocals. Takahashi herself commented: "The recording took place while everyone was striving to make the best work possible. Including 'Kokoro yo Genshi ni Modore', which we recorded at the same time, I sang even more professionally than before so that either song could be chosen as the theme song". She learned which song the production had selected, and where it appeared, only after watching the film in a theater. Takahashi described "Soul's Refrain" as "overwhelmingly easier to sing" than "A Cruel Angel's Thesis". She attributed this to its greater dynamic variation and the placement of breathing points where she naturally feels the need to breathe. Kazuya Tsurumaki, assistant director of the original series and director of Rebirth, later suggested that chief director Hideaki Anno select "Soul's Refrain" rather than "Kokoro yo Genshi ni Modore".

== Composition and lyrics ==
Neko Oikawa wrote the lyrics for "Soul's Refrain". At the time, she still had little familiarity with Evangelion. When writing "A Cruel Angel's Thesis", she had skimmed an Evangelion project proposal document and briefly watched two unfinished episodes before writing the song. For the two prospective film themes, producer Toshimichi Ōtsuki similarly gave Oikawa just a videotape containing a single episode, "Rei III", in which Rei Ayanami dies and another clone takes her place, along with demos of the two prospective theme songs, "Soul's Refrain" and "Kokoro yo Genshi ni Modore". The production team had yet to choose which song would serve as the theme. Ōtsuki simply instructed Oikawa to write whatever came to mind after watching the episode. Upon hearing the opening notes of the "Soul's Refrain" demo, Oikawa immediately conceived the phrase "return to me" (私に還りなさい, watashi ni kaerinasai) to match the melody. She associated Rei's death and replacement with the concept of reincarnation. "Kokoro yo Genshi ni Modore" also centers on the idea of life awaiting the moment of its awakening. Oikawa wrote its lyrics alongside "Soul's Refrain" after watching the same footage, resulting in similar themes between the two songs.

Oikawa initially conceived the phrase "Tamashii no Rifurein" (魂のリフレイン), but its syllable count did not fit the melody, and she disliked the truncated sound of "rifure". She therefore replaced "rifurein" with the French-derived pronunciation "rufuran", resulting in the title "Tamashii no Rufuran" (魂のルフラン). Oikawa also linked the opening phrase "return to me" to the image of "returning to the womb" (子宮に還りなさい, shikyū ni kaerinasai). Takahashi identified three elements as characteristic of the musical style associated with her long-standing collaboration with Ōmori: an opening led by the chorus, a dynamic minor-key melody, and solemn choral vocals. Takahashi also recalled that the word "soul" (魂, tamashii) carried religious and somewhat mysterious connotations at the time, giving the title a particular impact. The lyrics for "Soul's Refrain" remained unfinished until the recording day itself. UtaTen classified "Soul's Refrain" as a J-pop song, while LisAni! noted its fast tempo. Animate Times observed that "Soul's Refrain" expresses themes of motherhood, which Oikawa and Ōmori later revisited in "Dōkoku e no Monologue" (慟哭へのモノローグ, Dōkoku e no Monorōgu), a theme song for an Evangelion pachislot game. Jin Sugiyama of Real Sound described the song as "a fusion of an almost divine atmosphere and elements of club music of the time". The website Gyafun Kōbō similarly noted that the lyrics raise questions about human origins and the purpose of human existence. Despite the song's fast rhythm, the reviewer found that its lyrical world evokes a "strange sense of reassurance", alongside an anxiety over whether one should surrender to it, creating an "ambivalent" feeling.

== Release ==
King Records released the original "Soul's Refrain" single on 8-cm CD on February 21, 1997, pairing the title track with "Kokoro yo Genshi ni Modore" as its B-side. The single also included an instrumental version of "Soul's Refrain" titled "Off Vocal Version". First-edition copies came with an original Cardass Masters trading card from Japanese toy and entertainment company Bandai's Cardass collectible card line. On May 24, 2006, King Records issued a new CD single pairing "Soul's Refrain" with Loren and Mash's "Thanatos: If I Can't Be Yours"; the release also included "Kokoro yo Genshi ni Modore", a new mix of "Thanatos", and the "Off Vocal Version" of "Soul's Refrain". On June 20, 2018, the label released a remastered version of the title track on a double A-side single with "A Cruel Angel's Thesis". The release featured remastered versions of both songs sourced from their original analog tapes, and included instrumental versions of each track. The song also appeared on albums collecting music from the series, beginning with Geneon Entertainment's The Day of Second Impact, released to mark the date of the eponymous fictional catastrophe in the series' chronology. Refrain of Evangelion followed on July 24, 2003, and Neon Genesis Evangelion: Decade on October 26, 2005. On December 21, 2007, King Records issued a remastered version of the track on A.T. EVA01 Reference CD.

On October 7, 2020, the song appeared on the Evangelion Death disc included in Neon Genesis Evangelion Soundtrack 25th Anniversary Box and on the album Evangelion Finally. Five years later, Evangelion Flashback, released on October 29, 2025, also included "Soul's Refrain" for the series' 30th anniversary. On February 21, 2026, King Records issued a "Soul's Refrain" Evangelion 30th Anniversary Edition LP in both a limited-edition colored-vinyl pressing and a standard edition. In 2026, Apple Music also released a Dolby Atmos spatial-audio mix of "Soul's Refrain" alongside a corresponding mix of "A Cruel Angel's Thesis", following a proposal from Takahashi herself. Takahashi attended the Dolby Atmos mixing sessions and monitored the mixes throughout the process. For "Soul's Refrain", whose arrangement is centered on the bass, she felt that the initial mix placed too much sound in the upper part of the sound field, making the bass differ from the familiar impression of the original. She therefore requested adjustments that retained the original sound while preserving the characteristics of spatial audio. After repeated checks, the final mix preserved the sound familiar to listeners while adding greater presence to the lower part of the sound field. "Soul's Refrain" also appeared in pachinko machines based on Evangelion, including CR Neon Genesis Evangelion: Second Impact (CR新世紀エヴァンゲリオン・セカンドインパクト, CR Shinseiki Evangerion Sekando Inpakuto) and CR Neon Genesis Evangelion: Saigo no Shisha (CR新世紀エヴァンゲリオン～最後のシ者～, CR Shinseiki Evangerion: Saigo no Shisha).

== Critical reception ==
Chō! Animedia called "Soul's Refrain" "one of the representative songs of the Evangelion series" and described its melody as "catchy". Writer Tamotsu Narita of Da Vinci praised Neko Oikawa's ability to match the natural intonation of spoken words to a song's melody, citing "Soul's Refrain" as an example. Ciatr described "Soul's Refrain" as having an "impactful" sound and as one of the best-known songs from the Evangelion series. The same website also praised the song's "cool" melody and called the chorus phrase "Watashi ni kaerinasai" (私に還りなさい, lit. "return to me") "catchy". Kyoto University of Foreign Studies scholar Masatomi Furuhata referred to "Soul's Refrain" as a song "deeply engraved in our hearts", while Meiji University professor Toru Kato called "Soul's Refrain" a "classic anime song". Magmix praised "Soul's Refrain" as a great song whose lyrics and musical style match the world of Neon Genesis Evangelion. Singer Yui Sakakibara said she had long liked the impassioned way in which "Soul's Refrain" is sung. While recording her own cover, she was particularly struck by the difficulty of building the song's intensity further at the final words "Soul's Refrain", which made her appreciate anew the song's greatness and high level of technique. The BayFM music program 9 no Otoiki described "Soul's Refrain" as a "great song of grand scale" that invites repeated listening.

== Commercial performance ==
Upon its release, "Soul's Refrain" debuted and peaked at number 3 on the Oricon Singles Chart, selling 141,880 copies in its first week. It remained on the chart for twenty-one weeks and accumulated reported sales of 631,320 copies. On Billboard Japanese singles chart, the single debuted at number nine on March 3, 1997, fell to number twelve the following week, and then moved through numbers ten and eleven on March 17 and 24, respectively. It returned to number nine at the end of March, held that position for another week, and reached its peak of number eight on April 14. The single then declined to numbers sixteen and eighteen over the next two weeks, briefly re-entering the chart at number twenty on May 19. Among Takahashi's CD singles, "Soul's Refrain" remains her best-selling release, ahead of the original 1995 single "A Cruel Angel's Thesis", which recorded sales of 490,030 copies. A May 1998 report by Steve McClure in Billboard gave a higher figure of 880,000 copies for "Soul's Refrain". According to Chō! Animedia, by 2017, "Soul's Refrain" and "A Cruel Angel's Thesis" had sold approximately 1.5 million physical copies combined and exceeded two million downloads together. The 2026 "Soul's Refrain" Evangelion 30th Anniversary Edition LP also debuted and peaked at number 28 on the Oricon Albums Chart, selling an estimated 1,443 copies in its first week and remaining in the top 300 of Oricon's weekly albums chart for four weeks.

The Recording Industry Association of Japan (RIAJ) certified the single platinum in March 1997. More than a decade after its original release, "Soul's Refrain" entered the RIAJ's weekly Chaku-Uta Full chart at number 82 for the week of April 8–14, 2009. In a ranking of the top 50 anime songs for the 2016 fiscal year released by Japanese karaoke company Daiichikosho Amusement Multimedia (DAM), "Soul's Refrain" placed twenty-third. Another DAM ranking, based specifically on Live Dam Stadium usage data collected between January and November 2016, placed it twenty-second among the most frequently performed anime songs. In July of the same year, the RIAJ awarded the title track triple-platinum status for digital downloads, corresponding to more than 750,000 downloads under the association's certification criteria. In Karaoke no Tetsujin's annual rankings of the most frequently performed songs across its karaoke venues, "Soul's Refrain" placed 140th in 2018, 137th in 2019, and 149th in 2020. Its separate 2019 ranking of the most frequently performed anime songs also placed "Soul's Refrain" at number 20. The same year, "Soul's Refrain" ranked 30th among the most frequently performed anime, tokusatsu, and video game songs on Joysound's karaoke systems during the Heisei era, and 92nd overall in JASRAC's ranking of musical works based on royalty distributions over the same period. In DAM's 2020 annual ranking of the most frequently performed anime songs, "Soul's Refrain" also placed nineteenth.

== Music video and promotion ==
A promotional video for "Soul's Refrain" appeared on Neon Genesis Evangelion Genesis 0:0' The Light from the Darkness, a VHS released in Japan on February 22, 1997 as a bonus accompanying a special advance ticket for Neon Genesis Evangelion: Death and Rebirth. The VHS later accompanied an advance ticket for The End of Evangelion as well. King Records reissued Genesis 0:0' The Light from the Darkness, including the "Soul's Refrain" video, on a bonus disc in the Neon Genesis Evangelion DVD box on June 25, 2003. Genesis 0:0' subsequently appeared in the Neon Genesis Evangelion Blu-ray Box on August 26, 2015, and in the Standard Edition on July 24, 2019. In 2006, King Records included "Soul's Refrain" on the Neon Genesis Evangelion Music DVD, a collection edited by series assistant director Masayuki that synchronized songs from the franchise with selected footage from the Neon Genesis Evangelion anime. A "Soul's Refrain" video by Masayuki using footage from the Evangelion anime was also included in the music clip collection released as bonus material with the 2015 Neon Genesis Evangelion Blu-ray Box and the 2019 Standard Edition. The 2021 international Ultimate Edition Blu-ray release also featured the video.

== Impact and other uses ==
Oricon called "Soul's Refrain" one of the signature songs of the Evangelion franchise, while AllMusic critic Neil Z. Yeung described it as Takahashi's "biggest mainstream hit to date". Yūta Onda of Kai-You similarly described "Soul's Refrain" and "A Cruel Angel's Thesis" as songs whose popularity extends beyond the anime-song genre. In the 1998 Anime Grand Prix, a large annual popularity poll conducted by the anime magazine Animage, "Soul's Refrain" ranked second in the anime-song category behind "Rondo-Revolution" by Masami Okui, the opening theme of Revolutionary Girl Utena, trailing it by twelve votes. At the 2011 JASRAC Awards, "Soul's Refrain" ranked 12th among domestic works by royalties distributed during the previous fiscal year by the Japanese Society for Rights of Authors, Composers and Publishers (JASRAC). In a 2016 survey conducted by the Japanese music magazine CD & DL Data among 6,956 respondents, "Soul's Refrain" ranked sixteenth among respondents' favorite anime songs. In 2019, JASRAC ranked the song 25th among domestic works by total royalty distributions during the Heisei era. In the same year, the "Heisei Anime Song Grand Prix" project organized by Sony Music Entertainment Japan awarded "Soul's Refrain" the Movie Theme Song Award for the 1989–1999 period. In 2026, the song ranked 58th in TBS's Japan's Strongest Anime Songs Best 100, a ranking determined by votes from 166 singers, musicians, music producers, composers, and other music professionals across 41 countries and territories.

In 2009, m.o.v.e recorded the song for the compilation egg ~Get Wild & Be Sexy~ as the "Wireless Suns mix", remixed by Ezumi. In 2021, during an Evangelion-themed event at Tokyo Skytree, the Skytree Round Theater presented an HD music video of "Soul's Refrain" alongside footage of Takahashi performing live. The screening was added to the event's audiovisual program on March 8, following the theatrical release of Evangelion: 3.0+1.0 Thrice Upon a Time. In 2026, Takahashi contributed to the sound tuning of Evangelion-themed wireless earbuds produced by the Japanese audio brand Aviot. While discussing the product, she referred specifically to "Soul's Refrain", explaining that she wanted the earbuds to preserve the youthful brightness of her vocals while conveying the song's solemn character and pronounced dynamic shifts. She and Aviot's engineers therefore emphasized spatial depth, stereo separation, and deeper bass while keeping the vocals clear.

Numerous artists have recorded or performed covers of "Soul's Refrain". Recorded versions include those by Masami Okui, Toshl, Mikuni Shimokawa, Takahiro Mizushima, Miyavi, Yumi Matsuzawa, Yui Sakakibara, and Himeka. Yumi Hara recorded the song as The Idolmaster character Takane Shijō, while Chiaki Takahashi and Asami Imai performed it as a duet for The Idolmaster Radio. Junko Iwao, who voiced Hikari Horaki in Neon Genesis Evangelion, recorded another version for her 2013 album Anison A to Z. Groups that recorded or performed the song include Babymetal, Penguin Research, Roselia, Matenrou Opera, Animetal the Second, and Mary's Blood. Other artists have performed the song in concert. Shōko Nakagawa included it in her set during a 2011 concert with Golden Bomber, and NGT48 member Hinata Mimura performed it at the finalists' concert for the second AKB48 Group Singing Competition in 2020. Chieko Mizutani, a musical persona portrayed by Tomochika, also performed the song live. Japanese singer Sayaka Sasaki performed "Soul's Refrain" during a regional round of the third All-Japan Anison Grand Prix; she ultimately won the competition and subsequently made her professional debut as an anime-song singer.

== Live performances ==
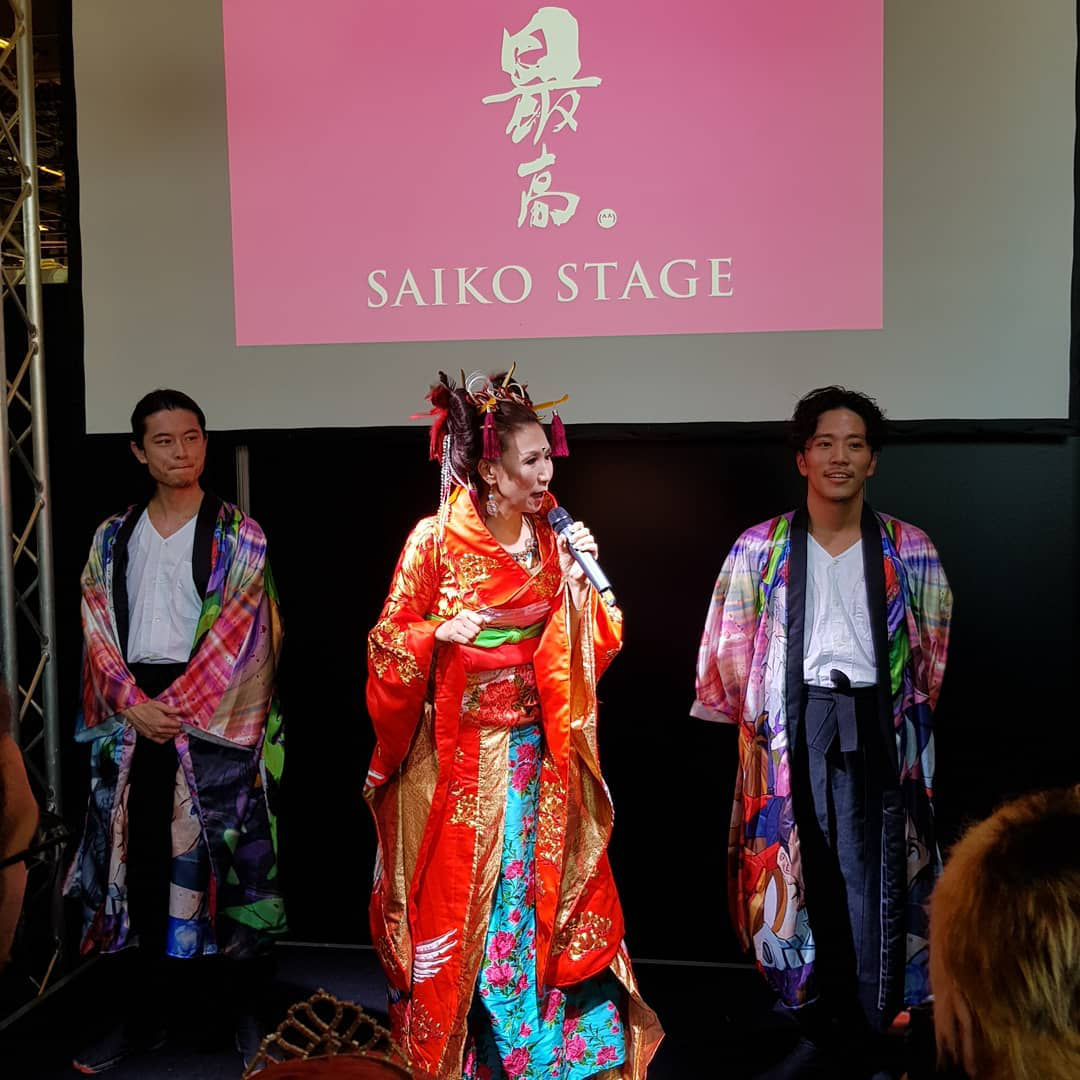
Singer Yōko Takahashi during a live performance at Japan Expo in Paris in 2019

In June 2015, Yōko Takahashi performed "Soul's Refrain" at the inaugural King Super Live, a large-scale anime music festival organized by King Records, at Saitama Super Arena. Two years later, Takahashi performed "Soul's Refrain" as part of an anime-song medley with "A Cruel Angel's Thesis" at the Keep On Shining Kayōsai 2017, a music event organized by comedian Tomochika through her fictional enka singer persona Chieko Mizutani. The following year, she returned to King Super Live, performing "Soul's Refrain" at the Tokyo Dome while holding a replica of the Spear of Longinus, a fictional weapon featured in the Neon Genesis Evangelion series. On January 14, 2019, Takahashi performed "Soul's Refrain" and "A Cruel Angel's Thesis" in full during a special live performance on the AbemaTV program Seiyū to Yoasobi.

In July 2019, Takahashi performed "Soul's Refrain" at Japan Expo in Paris as part of her five-song set for the Yoko Takahashi × Evangelion Stage. Later that month, "Soul's Refrain" opened a free mini-concert at Seibu Shinjuku PePe Plaza held to promote the release of "A Cruel Angel's Thesis: Matsuri Spirit"; Takahashi performed four Evangelion songs accompanied by dancers wearing hannya masks in front of an audience of approximately 2,000 people. In January 2021, Takahashi sang "Soul's Refrain" and "A Cruel Angel's Thesis" on the Fuji TV music quiz program Quiz! DoReMiFa Don! as part of a series of live studio performances by the original artists of songs featured in the program. In February of the same year, she performed both songs live as kickboxer Hinata Terayama's entrance music at a Real Impact Sports Entertainment event at Yokohama Arena.

In June 2021, Takahashi included "Soul's Refrain" in her first solo streaming concert, Yoko Takahashi Special Live [Refrain], held at Nissin Foods Power Station Reboot. Later that month, she joined the inaugural Non Fes the concert ~Nonko 40th Anniversary Tribute Festival~, organized by voice actress Noriko Hidaka to commemorate her 40th anniversary as a singer, and performed "Soul's Refrain". In August of the same year, "Soul's Refrain" opened the first day of Animelo Summer Live 2021 -Colors- at Saitama Super Arena, with Takahashi singing alongside Evangelion footage while holding a replica of the Spear of Longinus. In May 2023, Takahashi performed the song at Yoko Takahashi Evangelion ultimate Live "Tsukitoya", her first solo concert devoted entirely to Evangelion, held at Zepp Shinjuku in Tokyo. In May 2024, "Soul's Refrain" returned to King Super Live as part of Takahashi's set during the first day of the festival at K-Arena Yokohama. Two months later, Takahashi performed "Soul's Refrain" and "A Cruel Angel's Thesis" during the Dotonbori Surprise Live segment of Nippon TV's eight-hour music special The Music Day 2024. In February 2026, Takahashi performed "Soul's Refrain" during her Evangelion Flashback special live at the Evangelion:30+; 30th Anniversary of Evangelion festival at Yokohama Arena; during the latter half of the song, she held a replica of the Spear of Longinus, which later rose above the stage. In April of the same year, she appeared as a special guest at the inaugural Shower of Lights: Harmonics with Evangelion night show at Huis Ten Bosch, performing "Soul's Refrain" alongside dancers before an audience of approximately 360 people.

== Other versions ==
Yōko Takahashi's 1997 album ~refrain~ The songs were inspired by "Evangelion" included "Prologue de Refrain", arranged by Tony Orly, and a new version of the song, "Soul's Refrain (Tabris Mix)", performed by Takahashi herself. Megumi Hayashibara, the original Japanese voice actress for Rei Ayanami, recorded a new version titled "Aqua Groove Mix" for her album Irāvatī, released on August 6, 1997. She later included the same version on Vintage A (June 21, 2000), Evangelion: The Birthday of Rei Ayanami (March 30, 2001), and Starchild Girls Character Song Best (May 22, 2002). For the series' tenth anniversary, Takahashi recorded another rendition, the "10th Anniversary Version", for Neon Genesis Evangelion: Decade. In 2010, "Soul's Refrain" also appeared on the compilation Animates: Anime Hits in 80's Disco Style, which recast anime songs with arrangements drawing on 1980s disco, techno-pop, Eurobeat and related styles. The album featured the song as its ninth track, with vocals by singer Hotaru. In 2014, Japanese electronic music producer TeddyLoid created an official remix of "Soul's Refrain" at Japanese entertainment retailer WonderGOO's request; the retailer distributed the remix on an exclusive bonus CD to customers who purchased his debut album Black Moon Rising. TeddyLoid later included the track, retitled "Soul's Refrain (TeddyLoid 2014 Remix)", on his 2018 album Silent Planet: Infinity.

Outside the official Neon Genesis Evangelion discography, several remixes also entered Takahashi's catalog. Her album Li-La (November 6, 1997) introduced the "Erato Version", which later appeared on Super Value Yoko Takahashi (December 19, 2001), while Best Pieces II (February 10, 1999) introduced "Remix for Peace". Takahashi subsequently included the latter on Golden☆Best Yoko Takahashi (February 25, 2004), Yoko Takahashi Best 10 (January 17, 2007), Essential Best Yoko Takahashi (December 19, 2007), and Yoko Takahashi Best Selection. Li-La+3 (October 2, 2013) combined the "Erato Version" and "Remix for Peace" on a single release. Takahashi recorded another rendition, the "2010 Version", for her album 20th century Boys & Girls (June 23, 2010). She personally chose Shirō Sagisu, who composed the original score for Neon Genesis Evangelion, to arrange the version. It marked the first time Sagisu had arranged one of her songs. Takahashi later explained that she wanted someone who would meet fans' expectations and considered Sagisu the only suitable choice. In 2018, Sagisu included the same "2010 Version" on his four-disc 40th-anniversary compilation Anison Roku Plus. For her 2015 album 20th century Boys & Girls II, Takahashi recorded a new version of "Soul's Refrain" arranged by Masanori Sasaji. Music Natalie described the arrangement as a "mature dance number" that evokes the night, while Takahashi said that Sasaji's approach surprised her after the predominantly acoustic sound of the preceding tracks. She also re-recorded "Soul's Refrain" as part of a self-cover medley with "A Cruel Angel's Thesis", produced by Satoshi Takebe, for her compilation album Yoko Sings Forever, released on March 22, 2017.

== Track listing and versions ==
1997 single/digital release track listing
No.	Title	Lyrics	Music	Arrangement	Length
1.	"Soul's Refrain" (魂のルフラン)	Neko Oikawa	Toshiyuki Ōmori	Ōmori	5:14
2.	"Kokoro yo Genshi ni Modore" (心よ原始に戻れ, lit. 'Heart, Return to Your Origin')	Oikawa	Hidetoshi Sato	Ōmori	4:52
3.	"Soul's Refrain" (off vocal version)				5:12
4.	"Kokoro yo Genshi ni Modore" (off vocal version)				4:49
Total length:					20:08

2006 re-issue single track listing
No.	Title	Lyrics	Music	Arrangement	Length
1.	"Soul's Refrain" (魂のルフラン)				5:14
2.	"Thanatos: If I Can't Be Yours (Note: Performed by Loren and Mash (alias of Lorrain Briscoe, Martin Lascelles, and Shirō Sagisu).)"	Mash	Shirō Sagisu	Sagisu	4:50
3.	"Kokoro yo Genshi ni Modore" (心よ原始に戻れ)				4:50
4.	"Thanatos: If I Can't Be Yours" (Nine Years After mix)				8:20
5.	"Soul's Refrain" (off vocal version)				5:11
Total length:					28:25

2018 re-issue single track listing
No.	Title	Lyrics	Music	Arrangement	Length
1.	"A Cruel Angel's Thesis" (残酷な天使のテーゼ)	Oikawa	Hidetoshi Sato	Ōmori	4:07
2.	"Soul's Refrain" (魂のルフラン)				5:14
3.	"A Cruel Angel's Thesis" (off vocal version)				4:06
4.	"Soul's Refrain" (off vocal version)				5:09
Total length:					18:38

2026 Evangelion 30th anniversary edition LP track listing
No.	Title	Lyrics	Music	Arrangement	Length
1.	"Soul's Refrain"				5:14
2.	"Kokoro yo Genshi ni Modore 2020" (心よ原始に戻れ2020)			Ōmori	5:09
3.	"Monologue of Sorrow" (慟哭へのモノローグ)	Oikawa	Ōmori	Ōmori	4:56
4.	"Pray to the Momentary Sky" (暫し空に祈りて)	Oikawa	Ōmori	Ōmori	4:58
5.	"Soul's Refrain" (2010 version)			Sagisu	5:53
6.	"Teardrops of Hope"	Yōko Takahashi	Takahashi	Ōmori	4:50
7.	"What If?"	Mike Wyzgowski	Sagisu	Sagisu	4:50
8.	"Crime and Punishment: Those Who are Unwilling to Pray" (罪と罰 祈らざる者よ)	Takahashi	Ōmori	Ōmori	4:50

== Charts ==
=== Weekly charts ===
Weekly chart performance for "Soul's Refrain"
Chart (1997)	Peak position
Japan (Oricon)	3

Chart (2018)	Peak position
Japan Download Songs (Billboard Japan)	89

Weekly chart performance for "Soul's Refrain/Thanatos"
Chart (2006)	Peak position
Japan (Oricon)	39

Weekly chart performance for "A Cruel Angel's Thesis/Soul's Refrain"
Chart (2018)	Peak position
Japan (Oricon)	36
Japan Top Singles Sales (Billboard Japan)	35

Weekly chart performance for "Soul's Refrain" (Evangelion 30th anniversary edition LP)
Chart (2026)	Peak position
Japan (Oricon)	28
Japan Anime Albums (Oricon)	5
Japan Top Albums Sales (Billboard Japan)	29

=== Year-end charts ===
Year-end chart performance for "Soul's Refrain"
Chart (1997)	Position
Japan (Oricon)	41

== Certifications ==
Region	Certification	Certified units/sales
Japan (RIAJ)	Platinum	400,000^{^}
Digital downloads
Japan (RIAJ) Ringtone download	2× Platinum	500,000^{*}
Japan (RIAJ) PC download	Gold	100,000^{*}
Japan (RIAJ) Ringtone Full download	2× Platinum	500,000^{*}
Japan (RIAJ) Single-track download	3× Platinum	750,000^{*}
^{*} Sales figures based on certification alone.

== Notes ==
=== Bibliography ===
- Oikawa, Neko (July 20, 2018). ネコの手も貸したい 及川眠子流作詞術 [I Want to Lend Even a Cat's Paw: Neko Oikawa's Style of Songwriting] (in Japanese). Rittor Music. ISBN 978-4-8456-3267-1.
