= Living with Joy =

Studio album by Yoko Takahashi
- Released: 25 October 1996
- Genre: J-pop
- Length: 46:16
- Label: Kitty Enterprises
- Producer: Mitsuo Takaku

Yoko Takahashi chronology
BEST PIECES (1996)	Living with Joy (1996)	~refrain~ (1997)

Singles from Living with Joy
- 1. "Meguriai" Released: May 25, 1996; 2. "Atarashii Shirt" Released: October 2, 1996

Living with Joy is the fourth album from Yoko Takahashi. The album is made up of half covers and half original songs. The tag line for the album was "A vocal album full of love" (「愛に溢れたボーカルアルバム」).

== Track listing ==
No.	Title	Length
1.	"Atarashii Shirt" (新しいシャツ New Shirt)	4:28
2.	"Living with Joy"	4:41
3.	"Ooo Baby Baby"	4:48
4.	"Hello Winter ~ Do space men pass dead souls on their way to the moon?"	3:33
5.	"Tsumetai Heya no Sekai Chizu" (つめたい部屋の世界地図 World Map of Cold Room)	4:41
6.	"WENDY no Hitomi" (ウェンディーの瞳 Wendy's Eyes)	4:06
7.	"Meguriai" (めぐり逢い Comme au premier jour)	4:13
8.	"Doko ka ni aru yo" (どこかにあるよ)	4:12
9.	"Shampoo" (シャンプー)	4:06
10.	"Snowscape"	4:47
11.	"Fly me to the moon (Night in Indigo Blue version) (Note: Treated as a bonus track, this recording was not originally intended to be on the album. Takahashi had previously song it as one of the variations of the end credit music of the anime Neon Genesis Evangelion.)"	2:39
