= Neko Oikawa =

Japanese lyricist

Neko Oikawa 及川 眠子
- Born: February 10, 1960 (age 66); Wakayama, Wakayama, Japan
- Genres: J-pop; pop rock; anison
- Occupation: Lyricist
- Years active: 1985–present
- Website: oikawaneko.com

Neko Oikawa (及川 眠子, Oikawa Neko; born February 10, 1960) is a Japanese lyricist who has written J-pop and anime theme songs over her career.

== Biography ==
Neko Oikawa was born in Wakayama, Wakayama. She made her songwriting debut in 1985 with Kanako Wada's "Passing Through", which won the Mitsubishi Minica Mascot Song Contest. During her time with Fuji Pacific Music, Oikawa wrote songs for numerous Japanese idols; most notably the duo Wink. In 1989, her song "Samishii Nettaigyo" for Wink won the Grand Prix at the 31st Japan Record Awards and the 22nd All Japan Wired Broadcasting Awards. In 1994, her song "Tokyo" for Yashiki Takajin won the Yomiuri TV Best Award and Special Award at the All Japan Cable Broadcasting Awards.

Oikawa's most well-known song outside Japan is "A Cruel Angel's Thesis", recorded by Yoko Takahashi for the 1995 anime series Neon Genesis Evangelion. The song has been ranked by Joysound as the most popular song on karaoke. According to Oikawa, she receives between 1 and 1.5 yen for every time every time the song is played at a karaoke hall. Combined with the royalties from the Evangelion pachinko machines, Oikawa receives no less than ¥30 million annually from the song alone.

In 2017, Oikawa set up the Neko Oikawa Nonfiction Award (及川眠子ノンフィクション賞, Oikawa Neko Nonfikushon Shō) to encourage more writers to do nonfiction works.

== Personal life ==
Oikawa had an affair with a Turkish man 18 years her junior in 2000 and traveled to Turkey to marry him in 2005. In their 13 years of marriage, they had only been together one-third of the time. She started going in debt during the marriage to the point where it reached ¥ 70 million by the time she filed for divorce in 2018. Oikawa published her biography Hakon (破婚; Breakdown), which detailed the last days of her marriage.

== Works ==
Oikawa's works include the following:

Shoko Aida

- "Tapestry"

Agnes Chan

- "Propose"

Rina Chinen

- "Pride + Joy"

Shizuka Kudo

- "Sora no Shōmen"

Anthony Lun

- "Ai ga Aru kara"

Alisa Mizuki

- "Yasashii Yoru ni Aimashō"

Akina Nakamori

- "Genshi, Onna wa Taiyō Datta"

Yōko Oginome

- "Himawari"
- "Sunao na Koi"
- "Heaven"
- "Shiawase wa Sunadokei no Yō ni"
- "Always"

Noriko Sakai

- "Eve no Tamago"
- "Namida Hitotsubu"

Shonentai

- "Excuse"

Super Monkey's

- "Aishite Muscat"
- "Wagamama wo Yurushite"

Yoko Takahashi

- "A Cruel Angel's Thesis"
- "Soul's Refrain"

Yashiki Takajin

- "Tokyo"

Wink

Tokusatsu themes

- "Ninpuu Sentai Hurricaneger"
- "Juken Sentai Gekiranger"
- "Shuriken Sentai Ninninger"
- "Ultraman Max"
