= Yashiki Takajin =

Japanese singer (1949–2014)

Takajin Yashiki (やしき たかじん, Yashiki Takajin; real name Takaji Yashiki (家鋪 隆仁, Yashiki Takaji)), often referred to as simply Takajin (たかじん), (5 October 1949 – 3 January 2014) was a Japanese singer and television personality.

Born in Nishinari-ku, Osaka, Japan, to a Zainichi-issei Korean father Gonzaburou ((unknown surname) 權三郞) and a Japanese mother Mitsuko Yashiki (Japanese: 家鋪光子), he started his singing career in the 1970s in Gion, Kyoto, and then moved to Shimokitazawa, Tokyo in 1980.

In 1981, he sang the theme song of the first movie of the Mobile Suit Gundam, Suna no Jūjika and it sold thirteen thousand CDs. He moved back to Osaka in 1982 and had been active mainly in the Kansai region since then. He sang many songs about Osaka such as Yappa Suki Yanen (1986), Osaka Koi Monogatari (1989), Nametonka (1990) and Tokyo (1993). He was popular in Kansai as a frank television presenter. Having made public his dislike of Tokyo, Takajin rarely made appearances on TV stations in Tokyo. He also kept a blacklist of people he wouldn't appear with. His trademark was sunglasses. He wore them because of his taste and glaucoma.

In January 2012, he announced that he had been diagnosed with esophageal cancer, and that he would take a leave and concentrate on its treatment. He made a short comeback in 2013, but he died on January 3, 2014.

Takajin owned five racehorses between years 1998-2006.

== Programs ==
- Takajin Mune Ippai (Kansai TV (関西テレビ))
- Takajin No Money (TV Osaka (テレビ大阪))
- Takajin no Sokomade Itte Iinkai (Yomiuri TV (読売テレビ))
- Takajin ONE MAN (MBS (毎日放送))
- Muhaha no Takajin (Kansai TV)
