= Yoko Takahashi =

Japanese singer (born 1966)

Yoko Takahashi 高橋 洋子
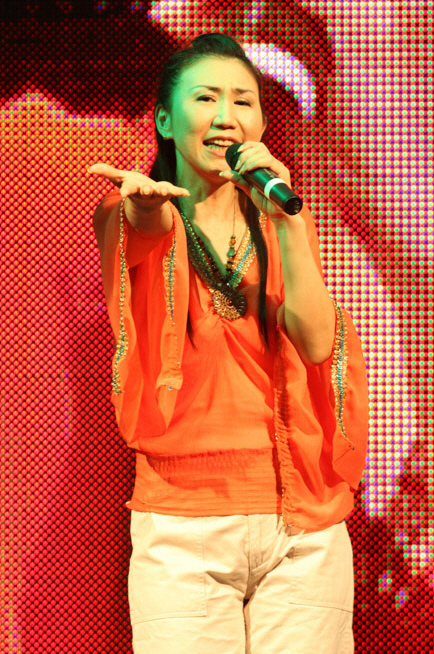
- Takahashi in 2010

Background information
- Also known as: YAWMIN
- Born: August 28, 1966 (age 60); Tokyo, Japan
- Genres: Pop rock
- Occupation: Singer
- Instrument: Vocals
- Years active: 1991–present

Yoko Takahashi (高橋 洋子, Takahashi Yōko; born August 28, 1966) is a Japanese singer, who is best known for her work throughout the 1990s, most particularly for her singles which were performed for and featured in anime, most notably the Neon Genesis Evangelion franchise.

== Early life ==
Takahashi began learning piano from her father at the age of two, and was a member of the Takinogawa Boys and Girls Choir when she was in elementary school. At the age of ten, she participated in an image album for Osamu Tezuka's work. In high school, she formed a band. In college, she was active in a light music club and aimed to become an opera singer.

Her younger brother is composer Gou Takahashi. His wife, Arimi Matsuno, is her sister-in-law. She has an older sister who is a voice trainer. She also has an older brother. Her parents are from Iwaki, Fukushima Prefecture. Her paternal grandfather was a palace carpenter.

== Career ==
Takahashi began her career in 1991, and released her first album, Pizzicato, in 1992, which reached #28 on the Oricon weekly charts. In the following years, she released the albums Kugatsu no Sotsugyō which charted, and Watashi wo Mitsukete, which did not achieve the same success of her previous albums.

In 1995, she released the single "A Cruel Angel's Thesis" (残酷な天使のテーゼ, Zankoku na Tenshi no Tēze), which was used as the opening song in the anime series Neon Genesis Evangelion. The song has received gold and platinum certifications, charted on the Oricon weekly chart numerous times, and has frequently been cited as one of the most influential songs used in anime. She has remixed and released several versions of the single, which have been met with the same commercial success.

In 1996, she released the album Living with Joy. Following her achievements with music, she continued to release singles and albums throughout the 2000s and 2010s, for which she was met with mixed success.

Takahashi's other works in anime includes performing an "acid bossa" version of "Fly Me to the Moon", and "Soul's Refrain", the closing theme of Evangelion: Death and Rebirth.

She also performed "Metamorphose", the opening theme to studio Gainax's 20th anniversary series, This Ugly Yet Beautiful World, the ending theme "Yoake Umarekuru Shōjo" (夜明け生まれ来る少女; "The Girl Who was Born at Dawn") for the anime Shakugan no Shana (灼眼のシャナ; "Blazing-Eyed Shana"), and the opening theme "Aoki Flamme" (蒼き炎, Aoki Honō; "Blue Flame") for Pumpkin Scissors (パンプキン・シザーズ, Panpukin Shizāzu).

== Discography ==
=== Albums ===
==== Studio albums ====
Title	Album details	Peak chart positions	Sales
Title	Album details	JPN	Sales
Pizzicato	Released: October 21, 1992; Label: Kitty Records; Formats: CD	75	JPN: 9,000
Kugatsu no Sotsugyō	Released: August 25, 1993; Label: Kitty Records; Formats: CD	85	JPN: 6,000
Watashi o Mitsukete	Released: November 26, 1994; Label: Kitty Records; Formats: CD, digital download, streaming		
Living with Joy	Released: October 25, 1996; Label: Kitty Records; Formats: CD		
Li-La	Released: November 6, 1997; Label: Kitty Records; Formats: CD	10	JPN: 48,000
Harmonium	Released: March 17, 1999; Label: Polydor; Formats: CD, digital download, streaming		
Aüm	Released: October 2, 2001; Label: Casta Diva; Formats: CD		
L'Ange de Metamorphose	Released: May 23, 2003; Label: B-Fairy Records; Formats: CD, digital download, streaming		
Sore wa Toki ni Anata o Hagemashi, Toki ni Sasae to Naru Mono	Released: December 7, 2005; Label: Geneon Entertainment Japan; Formats: CD, digital download, streaming	90	JPN: 3,800

==== Extended plays ====
Title	Album details	Peak chart positions	Sales
Title	Album details	JPN	Sales
Uchū no Uta	Selection of Moro Fukuzawa covers; Released: August 8, 2013; Label: Atomic Monkey; Formats: CD		
Koi ni Samusa o Wasure	Christmas mini-album; Released: August 8, 2013; Label: Moga Records; Formats: CD, digital download		
Evangelion Extreme	Selection of songs associated with Neon Genesis Evangelion; Released: May 22, 2019; Label: Sonic Blade; Formats: CD, digital download, streaming	54	JPN: 1,300
Evangelion Eternally	Selection of songs associated with Neon Genesis Evangelion; Released: May 10, 2023; Label: Sonic Blade; Formats: CD, digital download, streaming	66	JPN: 800
A Cruel Angel's Thesis (Evangelion 30th Anniversary Edition)	Released: February 21, 2026; Label: King Amusement Creative; Formats: LP	25	
Soul's Refrain (Evangelion 30th Anniversary Edition)	Released: February 21, 2026; Label: King Amusement Creative; Formats: LP	28	

==== Compilation albums ====
Title	Album details	Peak chart positions	Sales
Title	Album details	JPN	Sales
Best Pieces	Greatest hits album; Released: January 25, 1996; Label: Kitty Records; Formats: CD	65	JPN: 18,000
Refrain: The Songs Were Inspired by Evangelion	Neon Genesis Evangelion image album; Released: November 6, 1997; Label: Starchild; Formats: CD, digital download, streaming	6	JPN: 121,000
Best Pieces II	Greatest hits album; Released: February 10, 1999; Label: Kitty Records; Formats: CD		
Super Value	Singles collection; Released: December 19, 2001; Label: Kitty MME; Formats: CD		
Golden Best	Singles collection; Released: February 25, 2004; Label: Universal Music Japan; Formats: CD		
Best 10	Singles collection; Released: January 17, 2007; Label: Universal Music Japan; Formats: CD		
Essential Best	Singles collection; Released: December 19, 2007; Label: Universal Music Japan; Formats: CD		
20th Century Boys & Girls	Cover album; Released: June 23, 2010; Label: Starchild; Formats: CD, digital download, streaming	152	JPN: 900
20th Century Boys & Girls II	Cover album; Released: April 22, 2015; Label: Starchild; Formats: CD, digital download, streaming		
Yoko Sings Forever	Debut 25th anniversary album; Released: March 22, 2017; Label: Universal Music Japan; Formats: CD		
Evangelion Flashback	Evangelion 30th anniversary album; Released: October 29, 2025; Label: Universal Music Japan; Formats: CD	31	JPN: 1,600

=== Singles ===
==== 1990s ====
List of singles as lead artist
Title	Year	Peak chart positions	Sales	Certifications	Album
Title	Year	JPN	Sales	Certifications	Album
"Okaeri"	1991	—			Pizzicato
"P.S. I Miss You"	1992	87	JPN: 4,000		Pizzicato
"Shijima"	1992	42			Non-album single
"Mō Ichido Aitakute"	1992	38	JPN: 37,000		Pizzicato
"Woman's Love"	1992	—			Pizzicato
"Blue no Tsubasa"	1993	66	JPN: 14,000		Kugatsu no Sotsugyō
"Omoide Yori Tōku"	1994	—			Non-album single
"$1,000,000 no Koi"	1994	—			Watashi o Mitsukete
"Ano Koro ni Machiawaseyō"	1994	—			Watashi o Mitsukete
"Moonlight Epicurian"	1994	—			Watashi o Mitsukete
"A Cruel Angel's Thesis" (Note: Released both as a stand-alone single and a split single alongside "Fly Me to the Moon" by Claire.)	1995	17	JPN: 650,000	RIAJ (phy.): Platinum; RIAJ (dig.): Million	Neon Genesis Evangelion
"Meguriai"	1996	—			Living with Joy
"Atarashii Shirt"	1996	—			Living with Joy
"Soul's Refrain"	1997	3	JPN: 630,000	RIAJ (phy.): Platinum; RIAJ (dig.): 3× Platinum	The Day of Second Impact
"We're the One"	1999	—			Harmonium
"—" denotes a recording that did not chart or was not released in that territory.

==== 2000s ====
List of singles as lead artist
Title	Year	Peak chart positions	Sales	Certifications	Album
Title	Year	JPN	Sales	Certifications	Album
"Kokoro no Tsubasa"	2002	—			L'Ange de Metamorphose
"A Cruel Angel's Thesis" (reissue) (Note: Released as a split single alongside "Fly Me to the Moon" by Claire.)	2003	41	JPN: 12,500		Non-album single
"Metamorphose" (Note: Released as a split single alongside "Natsu-iro no Kakera" by Yōko Ishida.)	2004	23	JPN: 20,000		Sore wa Toki ni Anata o Hagemashi, Toki ni Sasae to Naru Mono
"Wing"	2005	97	JPN: 1,900		Sore wa Toki ni Anata o Hagemashi, Toki ni Sasae to Naru Mono
"Yoake Umarekuru Shōjo"	2005	21	JPN: 15,200		Sore wa Toki ni Anata o Hagemashi, Toki ni Sasae to Naru Mono
"Soul's Refrain" (reissue) (Note: Released as a split single alongside "Thanatos: If I Can't Be Yours" by Loren & Mash.)	2006	39	JPN: 8,800		Non-album single
"Aoki Flamme"	2006	42	JPN: 8,300		Yoko Sings Forever
"Seinaru Itami o Idaite"	2008	—			Non-album singles
"Kizudarake no Yume"	2008	174	JPN: 500		Non-album singles
"A Cruel Angel's Thesis" (2009 version)	2009	22	JPN: 17,800	RIAJ (ringtone): Gold	20th Century Boys & Girls
"—" denotes a recording that did not chart or was not released in that territory.

==== 2010s–2020s ====
List of singles as lead artist
Title	Year	Peak chart positions	Sales	Certifications	Album
Title	Year	JPN	Sales	Certifications	Album
"Monologue of Sorrow"	2010	34	JPN: 5,300		Evangelion Extreme
"Wing Wanderer"	2012	—			Non-album single
"Pray to the Momentary Sky"	2013	86	JPN: 1,300		Evangelion Extreme
"Shinjitsu no Mokushiroku"	2015	39	JPN: 2,600		Non-album singles
"Welcome to the Stage!"	2017	104	JPN: 500		Non-album singles
"A Cruel Angel's Thesis" / "Soul's Refrain" (reissue)	2018	36	JPN: 5,000		Non-album singles
"A Cruel Angel's Thesis" (Matsuri Spirit)	2019	142	JPN: 300		Non-album singles
"Nyankoku na Nyanko no Thesis"	2021	—			Non-album singles
"Final Call"	2021	—			Evangelion Extreme
"Teardrops of Hope"	2022	—			Evangelion Extreme
"—" denotes a recording that did not chart or was not released in that territory.

==== As featured artist ====
List of singles as featured artist
Title	Year	Peak chart positions	Album
Title	Year	JPN	Album
"What If?" (Shirō Sagisu feat. Yoko Takahashi)	2021	—	Evangelion Eternally

=== Other songs ===
==== Solo works ====
Year	Title	Album	Track
1989	"Maybe"	Silent Mobius Music Album "Caution"	#05
1989	"Cherry no Manma (Cherryのまんま)"	Doki² Waku² Sound Station	#10
1989	"Mystic Eyes... Ai wa Count Down (MYSTIC EYES…愛はCOUNT DOWN)"	B Gata Doumei Music Album	#05
1990	"Lonely Afternoon (ロンリー・アフタヌーン)"	Menomae no Ninjin	#07
1991	"Mystic Eyes... Ai wa Count Down (Remix)"	B Gata Doumei Another Music	#06
1995	"Fly me to the moon -acid bossa version-"	Neon Genesis Evangelion OST	#23
1996	"Yokan (予感)"	NEON GENESIS EVANGELION II	#01
1996	"Shiawase wa tsumi no nioi (幸せは罪の匂い)"	NEON GENESIS EVANGELION III	#01
1996	"Mugenhouyou (無限抱擁)"	NEON GENESIS EVANGELION III	#02
1996	"Kibun wo Kaeyou! (気分を変えよう!)"	Fortune Quest Gaiden original sound collection	#01
1998	"Fushigi na Melmo (ふしぎなメルモ)"	Fukkoku Tezuka Osamu Sakuhin Kessakusyu	#18
1999	"Shinkirou (蜃気楼)"	Tribute to Rebecca~Dream Discovery	#10
2000	"Lullaby no Yume (ララバイの夢)"	Snuggle Up	#10
2001	"Shirokuro Tsukete Kudasai (シロクロつけてくだサイ)"	NHK 「Mushimaro Q Gold 2000」 Dai Q ~Hara, Ippai, Hetta~	#03
2002	"We'll Be Together -2002-"	Aquarian Age Saga II Image Album	#11
2003	"Change My Heart (Qwerty Mix)"	Aquarian Age Saga II ~Don't forget me...~ OST	#01
2003	"Change My Heart"	Aquarian Age Saga II ~Don't forget me...~ OST	#34
2003	"Nijiiro Yumeiro Taikoiro (虹色・夢色・太鼓色)"	Taiko no Tatsujin Blue	#01
2005	"Kocchi Wo Muite Charmy (こっちをむいてチャーミー)"	—	—
2005	"Nijiiro Yumeiro Taikoiro long version (虹色・夢色・太鼓色 (ロングバージョン))"	Taiko no Tatsujin Tobikkiri Anime Special Dainesshu Utamatsuri	#23
2011	"Iroha ni ho he to (いろはにほへと)"	—	—
2013	"Extase"	"Shiro's Songbook 'Xpressions'"	Disc2 #14
2014	"Tamashī no Refrain (TeddyLoid Remix)"	Tamashī no Refrain (TeddyLoid Remix)	#1
2015	"Evolve"	—	—
2016	"Tamashī no Refrain (inu crabMixx) (魂のルフラン (inu crabMixx))"	Re:animation Presents Re:Boots Legendary Animesong Remixes	#5
2016	"Zankoku na tenshi no Thesis (inu crabMixx) (残酷な天使のテーゼ (inu crabMixx))"	Re:animation Presents Re:Boots Legendary Animesong Remixes	#6
2017	"TENSIONS – he who pays the piper"	SHIRO'S SONGBOOK The Hidden Wonder of Music	#12
2017	"Silver Jaguar no Theme (シルバージャガーのテーマ)"	Sōji Ushio (Tomio Sagisu) Zenkyoku-Shū (うしおそうじ (鷺巣富雄) ピープロ全曲集)	Disc5 #1
2017	"0-sen Hayato (0戦はやと)"	Sōji Ushio (Tomio Sagisu) Zenkyoku-Shū (うしおそうじ (鷺巣富雄) ピープロ全曲集)	Disc5 #6
2017	"Magma Taishi (マグマ大使)"	Sōji Ushio (Tomio Sagisu) Zenkyoku-Shū (うしおそうじ (鷺巣富雄) ピープロ全曲集)	Disc5 #8
2017	"Yadamon no Uta (Shiro-Kuro-Uta Iri) (ヤダモンの歌 (白黒歌入り))"	Sōji Ushio (Tomio Sagisu) Zenkyoku-Shū (うしおそうじ (鷺巣富雄) ピープロ全曲集)	Disc5 #11
2017	"Yadamon no Uta (Irotsuki-Uta Iri) (ヤダモンの歌 (色つき歌入り))"	Sōji Ushio (Tomio Sagisu) Zenkyoku-Shū (うしおそうじ (鷺巣富雄) ピープロ全曲集)	Disc5 #13
2018	"T.o.k.y.o"	Beat Piano Music 3	#5
2018	"A Merry Christmas to You"	Twin Guitar3: Cosmic Balloon	#12
2018	"Tensions alterna 2018"	Anison Roku plus (アニソン録 プラス。)	Disc4 #6

==== As YAUMIN ====
Year	Title	Album	Track
1992	"Touch me Softly -English version-"	Bannou Bunka Nekomusume Sound Phase 0I	#04
1992	"In the Fluffy Moon Nite -English version-"	Bannou Bunka Nekomusume Sound Phase 0I	#07
1993	"Rainbow Sky (レインボウスカイ)"	Bannou Bunka Nekomusume Sound Phase 0III	#10

==== As featured artist ====
Year	Title	Album	Track
1996	"Lost Paradise": (with Megumi Ogata)	Tajuu Jinkaku	#07
1999	"Utsukushii Hito": (with Masayasu Gyōten)	Le Bel Homme image album	#18
2008	"Hello, My Friend": (with Inagaki Junichi)	Otoko to Onna -Two Hearts, Two Voices-	#01
2013	"Kuchibiru yo atsuku kimi wo katare": (with Inagaki Junichi)	Otoko to Onna 4 -Two Hearts, Two Voices-	#06
2013	"Peaceful Times_the London-Tokyo meeting": (with Hazel Fernandes)	Shiro's Songbook 'Xpressions'	Disc1 #04
