= List of works by Hayao Miyazaki =

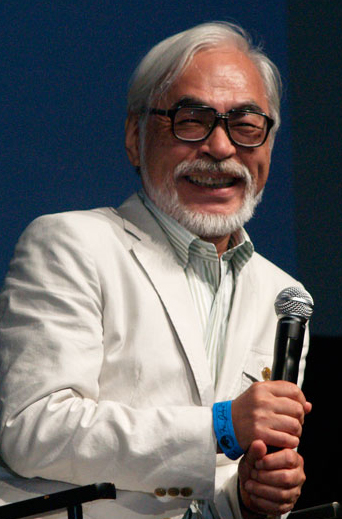
Miyazaki in 2009

Hayao Miyazaki (宮崎 駿 or 宮﨑 駿, Miyazaki Hayao; [mijaꜜzaki hajao]; born January 5, 1941) is a Japanese animator, filmmaker, and manga artist. He co-founded Studio Ghibli and serves as its honorary chairman. Over the course of his career, Miyazaki has attained international acclaim as a masterful storyteller and creator of Japanese animated feature films, and is widely regarded as one of the most accomplished filmmakers in the history of animation.

Born in Tokyo City, Miyazaki expressed interest in manga and animation from an early age. He joined Toei Animation in 1963, working as an inbetween artist and key animator on films like Gulliver's Travels Beyond the Moon (1965), Puss in Boots (1969), and Animal Treasure Island (1971), before moving to A-Pro in 1971, where he co-directed Lupin the 3rd Part I (1971–1972) alongside Isao Takahata. After moving to Zuiyō Eizō (later Nippon Animation) in 1973, Miyazaki worked as an animator on World Masterpiece Theater and directed the television series Future Boy Conan (1978). He joined Tokyo Movie Shinsha in 1979 to direct his first feature film The Castle of Cagliostro (1979) and the television series Sherlock Hound (1984–1985). He wrote and illustrated the manga Nausicaä of the Valley of the Wind (1982–1994) and directed the 1984 film adaptation produced by Topcraft.

Miyazaki co-founded Studio Ghibli in 1985, writing and directing films such as Laputa: Castle in the Sky (1986), My Neighbor Totoro (1988), Kiki's Delivery Service (1989), and Porco Rosso (1992), which were met with critical and commercial success in Japan. Miyazaki's Princess Mononoke (1997) was the first animated film to win the Japan Academy Film Prize for Picture of the Year and briefly became the highest-grossing film in Japan; its Western distribution increased Ghibli's worldwide popularity and influence. Spirited Away (2001) became Japan's highest-grossing film and won the Academy Award for Best Animated Feature; it is frequently ranked among the greatest films of the 21st century. Miyazaki's later films—Howl's Moving Castle (2004), Ponyo (2008), and The Wind Rises (2013)—also enjoyed critical and commercial success. He retired from feature films in 2013 but later returned to make The Boy and the Heron (2023), which won the Academy Award for Best Animated Feature.

== Filmography ==
=== Feature films ===
Year	Title	Director	Writer	Producer	Notes
1979	The Castle of Cagliostro	Yes	Yes	No	
1984	Nausicaä of the Valley of the Wind	Yes	Yes	No	Based on his own manga
1986	Castle in the Sky	Yes	Yes	No	
1988	My Neighbor Totoro	Yes	Yes	No	
1989	Kiki's Delivery Service	Yes	Yes	Yes	
1992	Porco Rosso	Yes	Yes	No	Based on his own manga
1995	Whisper of the Heart	No	Yes	Supervising	
1997	Princess Mononoke	Yes	Yes	No	
2001	Spirited Away	Yes	Yes	No	
2004	Howl's Moving Castle	Yes	Yes	Executive	
2008	Ponyo	Yes	Yes	Executive	
2010	Arrietty	No	Yes	Executive	
2011	From Up on Poppy Hill	No	Yes	No	
2013	The Wind Rises	Yes	Yes	No	Based on his own manga
2023	The Boy and the Heron	Yes	Yes	No	

==== Executive producer only ====
- The Story of Yanagawa's Canals (1987) (TV documentary)
- Only Yesterday (1991)
- Pom Poko (1994)

=== Short films ===
Year	Title	Director	Writer	Producer	Notes
1995	On Your Mark	Yes	Yes	No	Music video
2001	Whale Hunt	Yes	Yes	No	
2002	Koro's Big Day Out	Yes	Yes	No	
2002	Imaginary Flying Machines	Yes	Yes	No	
2003	Mei and the Kittenbus	Yes	Yes	No	Sequel to My Neighbor Totoro
2006	Mon Mon the Water Spider	Yes	Yes	Yes	
2006	House-hunting	Yes	Yes	Yes	
2006	The Day I Bought A Star	Yes	Yes	No	
2010	Mr. Dough and the Egg Princess	Yes	Yes	No	
2018	Boro the Caterpillar	Yes	Yes	Executive	

=== Other credits ===
Year	Title	Role	Notes
2002	The Cat Returns	Project concept	
2006	Tales from Earthsea	Based on his graphic novel Shuna's Journey	
2007	The Pixar Story	Thanks	Documentary
2010	Toy Story 3	Thanks	
2011	Treasure Hunting	Planning	Short film
2011	La Luna	Thanks	Short film
2013	The Kingdom of Dreams and Madness	Subject	Documentary
2015	Avengers: Age of Ultron	Thanks	
2016	Never-Ending Man: Hayao Miyazaki	Subject	TV documentary film
2017	Mary and the Witch's Flower	Thanks	
2019	10 Years with Hayao Miyazaki	Subject	TV documentary mini series
2020	Earwig and the Witch	Planning	CG TV movie
2024	Hayao Miyazaki and the Heron	Subject	Documentary
2024	Miyazaki, Spirit of Nature	Subject	Documentary

== Early works (animation) ==
Work	Year	Format	Role
Wolf Boy Ken	1963	TV series	In-between animation, direction by Isao Takahata and Sadao Tsukioka
Doggie March	1963	Feature film	In-between animation, direction by Akira Daikubara
Shōnen Ninja Kaze no Fujimaru	1964	TV series	In-between and key animation, direction by Daisaku Shirakawa and Kimio Yabuki
Gulliver's Travels Beyond the Moon	1965	Feature film	In-between animation, direction by Masao Kuroda and Sane Yamamoto
Sally the Witch	1966	TV series	Key animation, direction by Toshio Katsuta and Hiroshi Ikeda
Rainbow Sentai Robin	1966	TV series (episodes 34 and 38)	Key animation
The Great Adventure of Horus, Prince of the Sun	1968	Feature film	Key animation, storyboards, scene design, direction by Isao Takahata
The Wonderful World of Puss 'n Boots	1969	Feature film	Key animation, storyboards, design; direction by Kimio Yabuki
Moomin	1969	TV series	Key animation; direction by Masaaki Osumi, Noboru Ishiguro, Satoshi Dezaki, Ryosuke Takahashi and Rintaro
Flying Phantom Ship	1969	Feature film	Key animation, storyboards, design; direction by Hiroshi Ikeda
Animal Treasure Island	1971	Feature film	Story consultant, key animation, storyboards, scene design; direction by Hiroshi Ikeda
Ali Baba and the Forty Thieves	1971	Feature film	Organizer, key animation, storyboards; direction by Hiroshi Shidara
Lupin the 3rd Part I	1971	TV series (15 episodes)	Co-direction, with Isao Takahata
Yuki's Sun	1972	Television pilot (not produced)	Direction
Akado Suzunosuke	1972	TV series	Storyboards
Panda! Go, Panda!	1972	Short film	Concept, screenplay, storyboards, scene design, key animation; direction by Isao Takahata
Panda! Go, Panda!: The Rainy-Day Circus	1973	Short film	Screenplay, storyboards, scene design, art design, key animation; direction by Isao Takahata
Heidi, Girl of the Alps	1974	TV series	Scene design and layout; direction by Isao Takahata
3000 Leagues in Search of Mother	1976	TV series	Scene design and layout; direction by Isao Takahata
Rascal the Raccoon	1977	TV series	Key animation
Future Boy Conan	1978	TV series	Direction
Anne of Green Gables	1979	TV series (episodes 1–15)	Scene design and layout; direction by Isao Takahata
Lupin the 3rd Part II	1980	TV series (episodes 145 and 155)	Direction; under the pseudonym "Tsutomu Teruki"
Space Adventure Cobra: The Movie	1982	Feature film	Key animation
Sherlock Hound	1984	TV series (5/6 episodes)	Direction, series direction
Nadia: The Secret of Blue Water	1990	TV series	Writer (original concept written in the 1970s); uncredited

== Manga works ==
The following list contains Hayao Miyazaki's works, both major and minor, since his debut as manga artist:

Work	Years	Summary
Nagagutsu wo Haita Neko ([The Wonderful World of] Puss 'n Boots)	1969	Serialization in a newspaper of a feature film by Toei Doga (Toei Animation Studio), for which Miyazaki worked as a key animator. Based on Charles Perrault's book. Pero, the dandy cat, helps a boy defeat an Ogre and win the heart of a princess.
Sabaku no Tami (People of the Desert)	1969–70	Written for a newspaper targeted for children. It deals with the devastation of war, betrayal, and the ugliness of the human nature under desperate situations.
Doubutsu Takarajima (Animal Treasure Island)	1972	Serialization in a newspaper of a feature film by Toei Doga (Toei Animation Studio), for which Miyazaki worked as a key animator. A slapstick adventure story based on Stevenson's Treasure Island.
Kaze no Tani no Naushika (Nausicaä of the Valley of Wind)	1982–94	Precursor and partial adaptation of the anime film of the same name, with a much more extended plot than the film.
Imouto he (To my Sister)	1982	A six-page graphic poem about a dream a boy has in which he and his sick twin sister fly and travel around the world, and he can bring happiness to her.
Shuna no Tabi (Shuna's Journey)	1983	An all-watercolor 147 page graphic novel considered by some as a Nausicaä prototype. It's about a prince of a very poor country who journeys in search of the Golden Wheat to save his people from starving.
Miyazaki Hayao no Zassō Nōto (Hayao Miyazaki's Daydream Data Notes)	1984–92	Series of manga (or rather, "graphic essays") which Miyazaki had very sporadically written in a Japanese monthly scale model magazine, Model Graphix. They are totally independent manga stories, mecha ideas, or movie ideas about tanks, planes, or battle ships from the era before World War II - the "favorites" of Miyazaki.
Hikōtei Jidai (The Age of the Flying Boat)	1989	A 15-page all watercolor manga, which the animated film Porco Rosso is based on. It was serialized in Model Graphix, as part of Miyazaki's Zassō Nōto series.
Hansu no Kikan (The Return of Hans)	1994	An all-watercolor manga based on the fictional adventures of Hans, a German chief tank mechanic, at the end of World War II, serialized in Model Graphix.
Kuuchuu de Oshokuji (Dining in the Air)	1994	An all-watercolor short manga about the history of in-flight meals.
Doromamire no Tora (Tigers in the Mud)	1998–99	An all-watercolor manga based on the memoirs of Otto Carius, a German tank commander. It was serialized in Model Graphix, under a new series name Mousou Nouto (Delusion Notes).
A Trip to Tynemouth	2006	An adapted manga version of a translated collection of three young adult short stories written by Robert Westall.
Kaze Tachinu (The Wind Rises)	2009	The story of Mitsubishi A6M Zero fighter designer Jiro Horikoshi, which the animated film of the same name is based on. Published in Model Graphix with the subtitle Mousou Comeback.
Teppou Samurai (Gun Samurai)	2015	A manga series about samurai in Japan's Warring States era.

== Bibliography ==
- Princess Mononoke: The First Story (1993)
- Starting Point: 1979–1996 (1996)
- Turning Point: 1997–2008 (2014, English translation)
