= Michiyo Yasuda =

Japanese animator and colour designer (1939–2016)

- Born: April 28, 1939; Nakano, Tokyo, Japan
- Died: October 5, 2016 (aged 77)
- Occupation: Animator / Colour designer

Michiyo Yasuda (保田 道世, Yasuda Michiyo; April 28, 1939 – October 5, 2016) was a Japanese animator and colour designer who worked for Toei Animation, A Production, Nippon Animation, Topcraft, and Studio Ghibli. Her designs were used by directors such as Isao Takahata, Hayao Miyazaki and Mamoru Oshii. During a career spanning five decades in the animation industry, she worked on animated feature films and short films for theatrical release, original video animation (OVA), promotional music videos, animated television series, documentaries and commercials. Yasuda provided the colour designs for Miyazaki's Academy Award winning animated film Spirited Away. She officially retired after working on Ponyo in 2008, but worked on the Academy Award nominated animated feature The Wind Rises, released in July 2013.

== Early life ==
Born in Tokyo's Nakano ward, Yasuda grew up in the Tokyo metropolitan area. For most of her childhood and adolescence she lived in Higashi-fushimi, a neighbourhood in what became Nishitōkyō city as of 2001. Her father was a university professor, and she grew up with an older brother, an older sister and three younger brothers. She has described her youth as very pleasant with a lot of freedom and mentioned getting encouragement to excel in any field. She received an education in culture and the arts at school and at home.

When she was 14 years old her parents divorced. In November 1954 her father fell ill and, in spite of their divorce, was nursed by her mother until his death in March 1955. In April 1955 Yasuda enrolled in Tokyo Metropolitan Shakujii High School. Without the opportunity to continue into higher education she started looking for a job to support herself.

== Career ==
Yasuda joined Toei Doga in April 1958, immediately after her graduation from high school. Yasuda has said that she applied not knowing what the job entailed but that she had submitted her application because she did not fancy employment in any of the other jobs available for most women at the time, such as bank teller or store clerk. Instead she took the opportunity to work in a creative field. She started out in the Toei finishing department, in the ink and paint section, where she worked on TV series and commercials as a tracer. In traditional animation a tracer is a person whose job involves transferring cleaned up line drawings onto the cels. Through her work and union activities at the company she made the acquaintance of Isao Takahata and Hayao Miyazaki whose careers also began at Toei, joining in 1959 and 1963 respectively.

Yasuda also worked as a tracer on Hols: Prince of the Sun, directed by Takahata, for which Yasuo Ōtsuka was animation director and Miyazaki was one of the key animators. They built lasting working relationships that endured for over 40 years. After leaving Toei Yasuda next joined A Production followed by Nippon Animation where she worked in the finishing department on productions such as 3000 Leagues in Search of Mother. On the animated TV series Future Boy Conan, aired in Japan in 1978, she was in charge of colour selection for an entire project for the first time. This position involved her choosing colour for all the items and characters seen in motion throughout the animated work.

In 1983 she worked for Top Craft in charge of colour design on the adaptation of Miyazaki's manga Nausicaä of the Valley of the Wind into the animated feature film of the same title. The film was released in Japanese theaters on March 11, 1984. The collaborations culminated in the creation of Studio Ghibli in June 1985. Yasuda worked with Mamoru Oshii on his 1985 OVA Angel's Egg released in December 1985. She took charge of Studio Ghibli's colour department from its inception for the creation of the Castle in the Sky production and collaborated with various directors and animators in the creation of nearly all Studio Ghibli animation works until her retirement. She last worked on the feature films Ponyo and The Wind Rises and in between on the short Pandane to tamago hime for the Ghibli Museum.

Throughout most of her career Yasuda worked on colour designs for animators who employed the use of inks and paints for their creations but she also worked with digital media and used software like Toonz for her craft. At Studio Ghibli, Yasuda decided colours in consultation with Miyazaki and let the depicted objects guide her choices, based on the availability of materials and dyes in the time period portrayed. Her choice of individual colours and a colour scheme was also determined based on the mood of each film, a particular scene and the personality of each individual character. In the Los Angeles Times Cristy Lytal observed: "For Yasuda, color is a storytelling tool that is every bit as powerful as words". In the article, Lytal quotes Yasuda, saying: "What I like best is when I am building up the colors in my head, thinking of how to get the tone worked out," and "Color has a meaning, and it makes the film more easily understood. Colors and pictures can enhance what the situation is on screen."

In their book Anime Classics Zettai!, Brian Camp and Julie Davis made note of Yasuda as a "mainstay of Studio Ghibli's extraordinary design and production team".

Yasuda died on October 5, 2016, at the age of 77.

=== Awards and recognition ===
In 2011, Yasuda received an Animation Lifetime Achievement Award from the Japanese Movie Critics Awards.

== Filmography ==
=== Theatrical release ===
- Hols: Prince of the Sun (1968)
- The Wonderful World of Puss 'n Boots (1969)
- Panda! Go, Panda! (1972)
- Panda! Go, Panda! The Rainy-Day Circus (1973)
- Nausicaä of the Valley of the Wind (1984)
- Castle in the Sky (1986)
- Grave of the Fireflies (1988)
- My Neighbor Totoro (1988)
- Kiki's Delivery Service (1989)
- Only Yesterday (1991)
- Porco Rosso (1992)
- Pom Poko (1994)
- Whisper of the Heart (1995)
- Princess Mononoke (1997)
- My Neighbors the Yamadas (1999)
- Spirited Away (2001)
- Howl's Moving Castle (2004)
- Tales from Earthsea (2006)
- Ponyo (2008)
- The Wind Rises (2013)

=== Ghibli Museum shorts ===
- Kujiratori (2001)
- Mei and the Kitten Bus (2003)
- Koro no Daisanpo (2002)
- Ghiblies Episode 2 (2002)
- Mizugumo Monmon (2006)
- Hoshi o Katta Hi (2006)
- Looking for a Home (2006)
- Pandane to tamago hime (2010)

=== Television ===
- Dog of Flanders (1975)
- 3000 Leagues in Search of Mother (1976)
- Future Boy Conan (1978)
- Anne of Green Gables (1979)
- Lucy of the Southern Rainbow (1982)
- Mīmu Iro Iro Yume no Tabi (1983)

=== OVA ===
- Angel's Egg (1985)
- Devilman (1987)

=== Music video ===
- Ghibli experimental theater On Your Mark (1995)

=== Documentary ===
- The Story of Yanagawa's Canals (1987)

=== Commercial ===
- The Sky Colored Seed (1992)

=== Appearance ===
- This is How "Princess Mononoke" was Born (「もののけ姫」はこうして生まれた, "Mononoke Hime" wa kōshite umareta)
