= Short films by Studio Ghibli =

Short films by Japanese animation studio Studio Ghibli

Cover of "Ghibli ga Ippai Special: Short Short", a collection of short films from Studio Ghibli. The cover shows small thumbnails of many of the short films.

Studio Ghibli is a Japanese animation film studio founded in Koganei, Tokyo, on June 15, 1985. In addition to producing feature films, Studio Ghibli also produced several short films for the Ghibli Museum, commercials, and music videos. Several of these films were released directly to video.

== Commercials ==
Studio Ghibli has created and produced a variety of different commercials. This includes 17 short commercials, collaborating with companies such as Lawson, Asahi, and Nippon TV.

=== Nandarō ===
Nandarō (なんだろう; lit. 'What Is It?') was a series of commercial spots for NTV which were created by Hayao Miyazaki at Studio Ghibli. The spots first aired during November 1992, and featured one 15-second spot and four 5-second spots. They have been released on both the Ghibli ga Ippai LaserDisc box set and the Ghibli ga Ippai Special Short Short DVD set.

=== All Grown Up ===
Studio Ghibli, Subaru, and the Kinyō Roadshow had a special one-off collaboration featuring grown-up Chihiro and Yubaba from Spirited Away. It was released on January 5, 2024, coinciding with Hayao Miyazaki's 83rd birthday. Chihiro and Yubaba were voiced by the original voice actors, Mari Natsuki and Rumi Hiiragi. Fans of Spirited Away felt very nostalgic after hearing their matured voices.

=== Sora Iro no Tane ===
Sora Iro no Tane (そらいろのたね; lit. 'The Sky-Colored Seed') is based on a 1964 Japanese children's book written by Rieko Nakagawa and illustrated by Yuriko Omura. Miyazaki animates a boy trading his favorite airplane for a "sky-colored seed", which then sprouts a house. The house grows to fit many creatures and items but then collapses when the fox that traded the seed for the airplane takes the house back. He kicks everyone out of the house, only for the sun to crash into it, causing it to crumble. This commercial was created to celebrate Nippon Television's 40th anniversary.

== Music videos ==
Studio Ghibli and its subsidiary Studio Kajino have created four official music videos from 1995 to 2005.

=== On Your Mark ===
"On Your Mark" (オン・ユア・マーク, On Yua Māku) is a song by the Japanese rock duo Chage and Aska. At their request, animator Hayao Miyazaki produced a music video for the song. The music video was created in 1995, is entirely animated, has no dialogue, and runs for about six and a half minutes. The song was used in advertisements for NEC, and was shown at the theatrical release of Whisper of the Heart in Japan.

The music video tells the story of two policemen in a possible near future who rescue a young girl with wings from the headquarters of a religious cult, and then have to rescue her from their own government.

== Short films ==
Studio Ghibli short films have premiered on television, in theaters (usually debuting with a full-length film from the studio), at the Ghibli Museum in Mitaka, Tokyo, and directly to home video formats such as DVD and Blu-ray.

=== Ghiblies ===
Ghiblies (ギブリーズ, Giburīzu) is a short film produced by Studio Ghibli, following a fictional animation studio and its employees. It was directed by Yoshiyuki Momose and produced by Hiroyuki Watanabe.

A 25-minute sequel, titled Ghiblies Episode 2, was released in theaters with The Cat Returns on July 19, 2002. Momose wrote the script and directed the sequel, with assistance directing from Eiichirō Tashiro and Chika Matsumura. Manto Watanabe, the drummer for the Okinawan band Shang Shang Typhoon, created the music for the short film. Other staff members included art director Noboru Yoshida, original character designer Toshio Suzuki, and special character designer Hisaichi Ishii. It was released on home video in North America as bonus content with Ocean Waves by GKIDS in 2017. Before that, GKIDS streamed the clip with English subtitles in United States' theaters along with the 15th anniversary screenings of Spirited Away in December 2016.

=== The Night of Taneyamagahara ===
The Night of Taneyamagahara (種山ヶ原の夜, Taneyamagahara no Yoru) is an anime short film directed by Kazuo Oga and released by Studio Ghibli. A DVD version was released in Japan on July 7, 2006. Kazuo Oga directed it after working on Hayao Miyazaki's Princess Mononoke. The film is based on Kenji Miyazawa's story of the same name, which made a strong impression on Oga. The story takes place in the Tohoku region of Japan, during a time of poverty and famine. A farmer named Ito has a dream where he talks to a member of the Forestry Bureau of being paid to burn charcoal by selling part of the forest to be cut, when the spirits of the forest arrive to stop him. After discussing it with the spirits, they say that it cannot be helped and to at least burn good charcoal.

=== Iblard Jikan ===
Iblard Jikan (イバラード時間, Ibarādo Jikan; literally "Iblard Time") is a Japanese anime OVA produced by Studio Ghibli. It was released in Japan by Buena Vista Home Entertainment on DVD and Blu-ray on July 4, 2007, as part of the "Ghibli ga Ippai Collection SPECIAL" label.

It is directed by Naohisa Inoue. The story is set in the imaginary world of Iblard, originally depicted in paintings by Inoue. The paintings of Iblard also inspired the fantasy sequences of Ghibli's Whisper of the Heart.

The story is set in the imaginary world of Iblard, originally depicted in paintings by Inoue. The paintings of Iblard also inspired the fantasy sequences of Ghibli's Whisper of the Heart.

=== Giant God Warrior Appears in Tokyo ===
Giant God Warrior Appears in Tokyo (Japanese: 巨神兵東京に現わる, Hepburn: Kyoshinhei Tōkyō ni Arawaru) is a 2012 Japanese kaiju short film directed by Shinji Higuchi. A live-action prequel and spin-off of Hayao Miyazaki's 1984 anime film Nausicaä of the Valley of the Wind, the film is a co-production between Studio Ghibli, Special Effects Laboratory Co., Ltd, and Khara, Inc. In the film, a woman from Tokyo recounts how her city was obliterated within hours by giant divine warriors.

=== Zen - Grogu and Dust Bunnies ===
Zen - Grogu and Dust Bunnies is a short film by Studio Ghibli directed by Katsuya Kondō, with music by Ludwig Göransson. Released on November 12, 2022, it is a three-minute-long animation for Disney+ in collaboration with Lucasfilm to promote the third anniversaries of both the streaming service and The Mandalorian. The short stars Grogu as he meditates while the Susuwatari from My Neighbor Totoro and Spirited Away interact with him.

== Ghibli Museum and Ghibli Park exclusive short films ==
The following ten short films were produced for and are exclusively shown on rotation at the Saturn Theater at the Ghibli Museum and the Orion Theater at Ghibli Park.

=== The Whale Hunt ===
Kujiratori (くじらとり; lit. 'Whale Hunt') is a 2001 Japanese animated short film written and directed by Hayao Miyazaki, shown only in the Ghibli Museum in Mitaka, Japan. The film has a running time of 16 minutes. It is drawn in a different, simpler style compared to other Studio Ghibli films and uses bright pastel colors.

Kujiratori tells the story of school children pretending they are building a boat. As imagination replaces reality, they find themselves on the ocean, hunting for a whale. A big, gentle whale appears, accompanies them back to land and plays with them. Then the fantasy ends and the children are back in their class room.

The film was shown at the 2002 New York International Children's Film Festival. It won the Ōfuji Noburō Award at the 2001 Mainichi Film Awards.

=== Film Guru Guru ===
Film Guru Guru (フィルムぐるぐる, Firumu Guru Guru) is an anime short film series which was shown at the Ghibli Museum from October 1, 2001, through November 17, 2008. The series was directed by Hayao Miyazaki with storyboards by Miyazaki and Hiromasa Yonebayashi (who also produced).

=== Koro's Big Day Out ===
Koro's Big Day Out (Note: Japanese: コロの大さんぽ, Hepburn: Koro no Ōsanpo; lit. 'Koro's Big Walk') is a 2002 Japanese animated short film written and directed by Hayao Miyazaki. The film is about Koro the puppy, who runs away from his mistress, experiences some adventures around town and who is finally happily returned home. The film is exclusively shown at the Ghibli Museum and Ghibli Park, both in Japan.

=== Imaginary Flying Machines ===
Imaginary Flying Machines written and directed by Hayao Miyazaki, produced by Toshio Suzuki, with music by Joe Hisaishi, was released on October 2, 2002. The Short film is available for viewing at the Ghibli Museum in Japan.

The film of Imaginary Flying Machines was a short film that showed the flying machines that appeared in Castle in the Sky. The film follows an anthropomorphic pig character who explains the working of the machines. The pig character is a unique inclusion as it is voiced by Hayao Miyazaki, making an on screen appearance within his films.

=== Mei and the Kittenbus ===
Mei and the Kittenbus (めいとこねこバス, Mei to Konekobasu) is a thirteen-minute sequel to My Neighbor Totoro that was written and directed by Miyazaki. Chika Sakamoto, who voiced Mei in Totoro, returned to voice Mei in this short. This sequel introduces Granny Cat (Neko Baa-chan), who is the oldest and largest of the cat busses, fitting hundreds of forest spirits in her cruise-like build. Granny Cat and Totoro are both voiced by Miyazaki in the short. The sequel focuses on the character Mei Kusakabe from the original film and her one-night adventures with Kittenbus, the offspring of Catbus, and other cat-oriented vehicles. The sequel was first released in Japan in 2003 and is regularly shown exclusively at Ghibli Museum.

=== The Day I Bought a Star ===
Hoshi o Katta Hi (星をかった日; literally "The Day [I] Raised (Harvested) a Planet") is an animated 2006 short film produced by Studio Ghibli. The film is based on a story by Naohisa Inoue.

The short film is about a boy who lives and works on a farm. One day when going to sell vegetables at a market, his cart breaks down. Two strangers, a frog and a mole, offer him a strange seed in exchange for the vegetables. The boy accepts and finds that the seed grows into a miniature planet. It continues growing as he tends to it, forming an atmosphere, weather systems and life. After being taken back to the city, he meets the stranger who sold the seed to him, and they release the planet into a galaxy of similar planets, where it will grow for years until becoming a real planet.

=== Looking for a Home ===
Looking for a Home (やどさがし, Yadosagashi) debuted in January 2006, directed and written by Hayao Miyazaki. The production team included Toshio Suzuki as the producer and Atsushi Oki as the cinematographer.

Fuki sets out with a big rucksack in high spirits on a journey to look for a new house. Along her way, Fuki encounters and befriends numerous manifestations of the natural world, from fish to insects to a kami who resembled Totoro. All the sound effects in this film were done by human voice. As a nod to the non-Japanese speaking audience, this short film contains little to no spoken Japanese, and the story is conveyed almost entirely through art and sound effects. Sound is also depicted on screen as animated writing.

=== Water Spider Monmon ===
Mizugumo Monmon (水グモもんもん; lit. Water Spider Monmon) is a 2006 Japanese animated short film produced by anime studio Studio Ghibli.

It is based in part on "Boro, the Caterpillar", a story idea which Hayao Miyazaki considered working on prior to the start of production on Princess Mononoke. The short film's main character is a diving bell spider who seems to have fallen in love with a water strider. Though she is scared of him at first, the water strider soon gets used to the presence of the spider.

=== A Theory of Evolution ===
A Theory of Evolution is a Japanese animated short film directed and written by Hiromasa Yonebayashi. It premiered at the Ghibli Museum on November 17, 2008.

Summary: The Theory of Evolution follows the story of the first organic organism as it evolves into a human.

=== A Sumo Wrestler's Tail ===
A Sumo Wrestler's Tail (Japanese: ちゅうずもう, Hepburn: Chūzumō) is a 2010 fantasy animated 13-minute short film written by Hayao Miyazaki and directed by Akihiko Yamashita. It is based on a Japanese folk tale, Nezumi no Sumō. It was produced by Studio Ghibli for the Ghibli Museum in Mitaka.

=== Mr. Dough and the Egg Princess ===
Mr. Dough and the Egg Princess (パン種とタマゴ姫, Pandane to Tamago Hime) is a 2010 short film. It is 12 minutes long and tells the story of the Egg Princess' and her new friend Mr. Dough's escape from Baba Yagas palace. Notably, the film does not contain dialogue but relies on sound effects and a baroque music soundtrack by Antonio Vivaldi and Joe Hisaishi.

Baba Yaga went out one day in search of eggs for a meal. When she returns home with her basket full, she finds one egg will not crack. Baba Yaga gives the egg one of her ribbons and grants the egg life, naming it the Egg Princess. As time passes, the Egg Princess is kept under the watchful eye of the witch as she is forced into indentured servitude. One night, the dough the Egg Princess was kneading comes to life. She gives the dough berries for eyes, and together Mr.Dough and the Egg Princess escape the Witch's mill. The two escape to the nearby village as Baba Yaga searches for them. She eventually finds them, but the Egg King and Queen interrupt with the royal guards. Baba Yaga glares at them; Mr.Dough offers the witch a piece of his chest. Baba Yaga quickly devours it before turning and leaving.

=== Treasure Hunting ===
Treasure Hunting (たからさがし, Takara sagashi) is a 9-minute short film that adapts a picture book by Rieko Nakagawa and Yuriko Yamawaki. The film is produced by Studio Ghibli, directed by Takeshi Inamura, produced by Toshio Suzuki, with music by Michiru.

Summary: In the film, a boy named Yuuji and a rabbit named Gikku find a stick at the same time and decide to compete in games to decide who can keep the stick. They compete in several competitions, but regardless of the competition, it always ends in a tie.

=== Boro the Caterpillar ===
Boro the Caterpillar (Japanese: 毛虫のボロ, Hepburn: Kemushi no Boro) is a 2018 Japanese animated short film written and directed by Hayao Miyazaki made for the Ghibli Museum. The story is about a recently hatched caterpillar named Boro as he takes his first steps into the world.

The short film is shown only in the Ghibli Museum and in Ghibli Park, where it premiered on 21 March 2018. It had its international premiere at the 2024 Cannes Film Festival, as part of the Studio Ghibli's Honorary Palme d'Or celebrations.

=== Night in the Valley of Witches ===
Night in the Valley of Witches (魔女の谷の夜, Majyo no Tani no Yoru) is an short film co-directed by Goro Miyazaki and Akihiko Yamashita. It is the first short film Ghibli has produced specifically for Ghibli Park, and is set inside the park's "Valley of Witches" section. The film premiered on July 8, 2026, at the Cinema Orion inside Ghibli Park.

== See also ==
- List of short films
