= Kazuo Oga =

Japanese art director and illustrator (born 1952)

Kazuo Oga (男鹿 和雄, Oga Kazuo; born 29 February 1952, in Akita Prefecture, Japan) is an art director and background artist for many Madhouse Studio and Studio Ghibli anime films. Oga has worked with many respected directors, such as Hayao Miyazaki, Isao Takahata, Yoshiaki Kawajiri, and Osamu Dezaki. He has also published two compilations of his art and directed a short animated film.

== Works (selection) ==
=== Director ===
- The Night of Taneyamagahara (種山ヶ原の夜, Taneyamagahara no Yoru), 2006

=== Art director ===
- Unico (ユニコ, Yuniko), 1979
- Tomorrow's Joe 2 (あしたのジョー2, Ashita no Jō Tsū), 1980
- Barefoot Gen (はだしのゲン, Hadashi no Gen), 1983
- Toki no Tabibito: Time Stranger (時空の旅人 -Time Stranger-), 1986
- Wicked City (妖獣都市, Yōjū Toshi), 1987
- My Neighbor Totoro (となりのトトロ, Tonari no Totoro), 1988
- Girls in Summer Clothes (夏服の少女たち, Natsufuku no Shōjo-tachi), 1988
- Only Yesterday (おもひでぽろぽろ, Omohide Poro Poro), 1991
- Pom Poko (平成狸合戦ぽんぽこ, Heisei Tanuki Gassen Ponpoko), 1994
- Princess Mononoke (もののけ姫, Mononoke-hime), 1997
- The Tale of Princess Kaguya (かぐや姫の物語, Kaguya-hime no Monogatari), 2013

=== Assistant background art director ===
- Treasure Island (宝島, Takarajima), 1978
- Space Adventure Cobra: The Movie (スペースアドベンチャーコブラ, Supēsu Adobenchā Kobura), 1982

=== Background art ===
- Panda! Go, Panda! and the Rainy-Day Circus (パンダコパンダ 雨降りサーカスの巻, Panda Kopanda: Amefuri Sākasu no Maki), 1973
- Adventures of Ganba (ガンバの冒険, Ganba no Bōken), 1975
- Nobody's Boy: Remi (家なき子, Ie Naki Ko), 1977
- Makoto-chan (まことちゃん), 1980
- Harmagedon: Genma Wars (幻魔大戦 ‒ハルマゲドン‒, Genma Taisen: Harumagedon), 1983
- Unico in the Island of Magic (ユニコ 魔法の島へ, Yuniko: Mahō no Shima e), 1983
- Lensman (SF 新世紀 レンズマン, SF Shinseiki Lensman), 1984
- The Dagger of Kamui (カムイの剣, Kamui no Ken), 1985
- Barefoot Gen 2 (はだしのゲン2, Hadashi no Gen 2), 1986
- Hoero! Bun Bun (ほえろブンブン, Hoero! Bun Bun), 1987
- Bride of Deimos (悪魔の花嫁 蘭の組曲, Akuma no Hanayome: Ran no Kumikyoku), 1988
- Demon City Shinjuku (魔界都市 新宿, Makai Toshi: Shinjuku), 1988
- Goku: Midnight Eye (Midnight Eye ゴクウ, Midnight Eye Gokū), 1989
- Kiki's Delivery Service (魔女の宅急便, Majo no Takkyūbin), 1989
- Urusei Yatsura: Always My Darling (うる星やつら いつだってマイ・ダーリン, Urusei Yatsura: Itsudatte Mai Dārin), 1991
- Porco Rosso (紅の豚, Kurenai no Buta), 1992
- Ninja Scroll (獣兵衛忍風帖, Jūbē Ninpūchō), 1993
- On Your Mark (オン・ユア・マーク, On Yua Māku), 1995
- Whisper of the Heart (耳をすませば, Mimi o Sumaseba), 1995
- Rurouni Kenshin: The Motion Picture (るろうに剣心 -明治剣客浪漫譚- 維新志士への鎮魂歌, Rurouni Kenshin: Ishin Shishi e no Chinkonka), 1997
- Vampire Hunter D: Bloodlust (吸血鬼ハンターD ブラッドラスト, Banpaia Hantā Dī: Buraddorasuto), 2000
- Spirited Away (千と千尋の神隠し, Sen to Chihiro no Kamikakushi), 2001
- InuYasha the Movie: Affections Touching Across Time (映画犬夜叉 時代を越える想い, Eiga Inuyasha: Toki o Koeru Omoi), 2001
- The Cat Returns (猫の恩返し, Neko no Ongaeshi), 2002
- Fantastic Children (ファンタジックチルドレン, Fantajikku Chirudoren), 2004
- Howl's Moving Castle (ハウルの動く城, Hauru no Ugoku Shiro), 2004
- The Girl Who Leapt Through Time (時をかける少女, Toki o Kakeru Shōjo), 2006
- Tales from Earthsea (ゲド戦記, Gedo Senki), 2006
- Highlander: The Search for Vengeance (?), 2007
- Ponyo (崖の上のポニョ, Gake no Ue no Ponyo), 2008
- Kawa no Hikari (川の光, Kawa no Hikari), 2009
- Summer Wars (サマーウォーズ, Samā Wōzu), 2009
- The Secret World of Arrietty (借りぐらしのアリエッティ, Kari-gurashi no Arietti), 2010
- A Letter to Momo (ももへの手紙, Momo e no Tegami), 2012
- Mary and the Witch's Flower (メアリと魔女の花, Meari to Majo no Hana), 2017
- The Boy and the Heron (君たちはどう生きるか, Kimitachi wa Dō Ikiru ka), 2023

=== Art books ===
- Kazuo Oga Art Collection (Oga Kazuo Gashuu). Tokuma Shoten, 1996. ISBN 4-19-860526-2
- Kazuo Oga Art Collection II (Oga Kazuo Gashuu II). Tokuma Shoten, 2005. ISBN 4-19-862074-1

== Exhibition ==
The Museum of Contemporary Art (in Tokyo, Japan) sponsored an exhibition called Kazuo Oga – The Man Who Drew Totoro's Forest from July 21, 2007, through September 30, 2007. A documentary about this exhibition Oga Kazuo Exhibition: Ghibli No Eshokunin – The One Who Painted Totoro's Forest (ジブリの絵職人 男鹿和雄展 トトロの森を描いた人) was released on DVD and Blu-ray.
