= The Demon Sword Master of Excalibur Academy =

Japanese light novel series and its adaptations

- First light novel volume cover, featuring Riselia Ray Crystalia (front) and Leonis Death Magnus (back)

聖剣学院の魔剣使い (Seiken Gakuin no Makentsukai)
- Light novel
- Written by: Yū Shimizu
- Illustrated by: Asagi Tōsaka
- Published by: Media Factory
- English publisher: NA: Yen Press
- Imprint: MF Bunko J
- Original run: May 25, 2019 – October 25, 2024
- Volumes: 16
- Manga
- Written by: Yū Shimizu
- Illustrated by: Asuka Keigen
- Published by: Kadokawa Shoten
- English publisher: NA: Yen Press
- Magazine: Monthly Shōnen Ace
- Original run: November 26, 2019 – February 26, 2025
- Volumes: 10
- Anime television series
- Directed by: Hiroyuki Morita
- Produced by: Ryou Hino; Chiaki Kondodu; Masahiko Nagano; Keigo Nakamichi; Shinji Oomori; Fumihiro Ozawa; Yasuichirou Shinbo; Hisaya Takahara; Tsuyoshi Miyamoto; Yoshiyuki Ishikawa
- Written by: Kunihiko Okada
- Music by: Yuji Nomi
- Studio: Passione (Note: Animation production assistance (アニメーション制作協力) for all episodes provided by Hayabusa Film.)
- Licensed by: Sentai Filmworks: SEA: Remow
- Original network: TV Tokyo, BS Fuji, AT-X
- Original run: October 3, 2023 – December 19, 2023
- Episodes: 12
- icon

The Demon Sword Master of Excalibur Academy (Note: English subname of the original Japanese light novel version is Demon's Sword Master of Excalibur School.) (聖剣学院の魔剣使い, Seiken Gakuin no Makentsukai), shortened as Sematsuka (せまつか) is a Japanese light novel series written by Yū Shimizu and illustrated by Asagi Tōsaka. Media Factory has published sixteen volumes from May 2019 to October 2024 under their MF Bunko J imprint. The light novel is licensed in North America by Yen Press. A manga adaptation with art by Asuka Keigen was serialized in Kadokawa Shoten's shōnen manga magazine Monthly Shōnen Ace from November 2019 to February 2025. It was collected in ten tankōbon volumes.

An anime television series adaptation directed by Hiroyuki Morita and produced by Passione aired from October to December 2023.

== Plot ==
A thousand years ago, the world was at war. Led by the Six Dark Lords, humanity as a whole was nearly led to the brink of extinction. However, humanity had hope in the form of the Six Heroes. With their power, the Six Dark Lords fell one by one until finally, only one remained. In the year 447 of the Holy Calendar, the Undead King, Leonis Death Magnus, also fell, but before his capital, Necrozoa, was conquered, he sealed his own body with a powerful barrier and cast a resurrection spell on himself. He declared that he will concede victory only this once, but he shall rise again in one thousand years to conquer humanity for that is the mission given to him by the Goddess of Rebellion.

In the present time, a young girl named Riselia Ray Crystalia stumbles upon the ancient ruins of Leonis's mausoleum. Accidentally undoing the seal, Leonis awakens after his thousand-year slumber in the body of a ten-year-old human child. Mistaken to be a refugee of the Voids, Riselia takes Leonis into her care, and Leonis begins his mission to uncover what has happened to the world while he slept.

== Characters ==
=== Main characters ===
Leonis Death Magnus (レオニス・デス・マグナス, Reonisu Desu Magunasu)
Voiced by: Mutsumi Tamura (voice comic), Marina Inoue, Daisuke Hirakawa (Dark Lord Leonis) (anime) (Japanese); Shannon Emerick, Michael Wronski^{Ep. 1 credits} (Dark Lord Leonis) (English)
The Undead King and Strongest of the Dark Lords, Leonis awakens in the body of a ten-year-old child one thousand years in the future. With the help of Riselia, whom he and Regina affectionally call "Selia", Leonis begins adjusting to his new life but Leonis also has plans of his own, including fulfilling the wish of his benefactor, the Goddess of Rebellion.
Riselia Ray Crystalia (リーセリア・レイ・クリスタリア, Rīseria Rei Kurisutaria)
Voiced by: Nao Tōyama (voice comic), Yui Ishikawa (anime) (Japanese); Luci Christian (English)
Riselia is the girl who unwittingly undid the seal on Leonis's mausoleum and died protecting him from a Void; left with no choice, Leonis "heals" Riselia with the only spell he is certain would work, the tenth-order spell "Create Elder Undead", a spell that worked so successfully on Riselia that she returned to life as the strongest undead being, a Vampire Queen. Her parents were killed by a void when she was young, leading her to develop a sense of justice to protect others from Voids. She later develops feelings for Leonis.

=== Seventh Assault Garden ===
Regina Mercedes (レギーナ・メルセデス, Regīna Merusedesu)
Voiced by: Saori Ōnishi (voice comic), Aya Suzaki (anime) (Japanese); Christina Kelly (English)
Riselia's childhood friend and personal maid, Regina is a buxom girl who spends most of her free time trying to elicit a reaction from Leonis, who deeply dislikes it. In actuality, she is the (former) Fourth Princess of the Integrated Empire, Regina Ray O'ltriese (レギーナ・レイ・オルティレーゼ, Regīna Rei Orutirēze). However, due to being born under a superstitious star, she was removed from the family and replaced by her younger sister, Altiria Ray O'ltriese (アルティリア・レイ・オルティレーゼ, Arutiria Rei Orutirēze).
Sakuya Sieglinde (咲耶・ジークリンデ, Sakuya Jīkurinde)
Voiced by: Honoka Kuroki (anime) (Japanese); Emi Lo (English)
Sword Warrior. Even though she was the youngest in the platoon after Leonis, Sakuya had a track record of conquering the void alone.
Elfiné Phillet (エルフィーネ・フィレット, Erufīne Firetto)
Voiced by: Hiromi Igarashi (anime) (Japanese); Olivia Swasey (English)
A caring senior who serves as telegraphist for the platoon to which Riselia belongs. She has a history of losing her companions due to Void. She uses a support-specialized holy sword (Heavenly Eye Jewel), but was originally an attacker in charge of firepower.
Fenris Edelritz (フェンリス・エーデルリッツ, Fenrisu Ēderurittsu)
Voiced by: Mami Uchida (Japanese); Natalie Rial^{Ep. 7 credits} (English)
A childhood friend of Riselia, an Executive Committee member of Excalibur Academy and Captain of the 11th Platoon. She has a strong, ladylike tone, and she and Riselia argue constantly whenever they meet, but she is very protective of Riselia and congratulates her on her awakening the power of the Holy Sword.

=== Six Heroes ===
Arakael Degradios (アラキール・デグラジオス, Arakīru Deguradiosu)
Voiced by: Takayuki Sugō (Japanese) (Japanese); Jay Hickman^{Ep. 1 credits} (English)
The Archsage of the Six Heroes and considered to be the wisest of them all, he had survived through the one thousand years since Leonis's "death" and fights him once again as a Void Lord. He is defeated and erased from existence by the Demon Sword Dáinsleif but not before giving Leonis an eerie warning.

=== Other characters ===
Roselia Ishtaris (ロゼリア・イシュタリス, Rozeria Ishutarisu)
Voiced by: Ai Kakuma (anime) (Japanese); Skyler Sinclair^{Ep. 1 credits} (English)
The Goddess of Rebellion, Roselia saved Leonis when he almost died from the human nobles' betrayal and turned him into a Dark Lord.
Shary Shadow Assassin (シャーリ・シャドウアサシン, Shāri Shadouasashin)
Voiced by: Arisa Nakada (anime) (Japanese); Karlii Hoch (English)
Leonis' dark minion and personal maid. She is once an assassin of the Realm of Shadows who originally sent to assassinate Leonis until she switched sides.
Blackus (ブラッカス, Burakkasu)
Voiced by: Kenichi Ono (voice comic), Tomofumi Ikezoe (anime) (Japanese); John Swasey (English)
Blackus is the prince of the Realm of Shadows and longtime comrade and friend of Leonis. He is known by his full name, Blackas Shadow Prince (ブラッカス・シャドウプリンス, Burakkasu Shadoupurinsu).

== Media ==
=== Light novels ===
The Demon Sword Master of Excalibur Academy is written by Yū Shimizu and illustrated by Asagi Tōsaka. It was published in sixteen volumes by Media Factory from May 25, 2019, to October 15, 2024, under their MF Bunko J imprint. The light novel is licensed in North America by Yen Press.

No.	Original release date	Original ISBN	English release date	English ISBN
1	May 25, 2019	978-4-04-065672-4	August 18, 2020	978-1-9753-0866-7
2	September 25, 2019	978-4-04-064003-7	December 15, 2020	978-1-9753-1915-1
3	January 24, 2020	978-4-04-064331-1	May 25, 2021	978-1-9753-2070-6
4	May 25, 2020	978-4-04-064657-2	October 12, 2021	978-1-9753-2072-0
5	September 25, 2020	978-4-04-064944-3	February 22, 2022	978-1-9753-3542-7
6	January 25, 2021	978-4-04-680164-7	June 28, 2022	978-1-9753-4346-0
7	May 25, 2021	978-4-04-680443-3	December 13, 2022	978-1-9753-4348-4
8	October 25, 2021	978-4-04-680844-8	April 18, 2023	978-1-9753-4862-5
9	February 25, 2022	978-4-04-681186-8	September 19, 2023	978-1-9753-6309-3
10	June 24, 2022	978-4-04-681472-2	May 21, 2024	978-1-9753-6965-1
11	November 25, 2022	978-4-04-681935-2	April 8, 2025	978-1-9753-7644-4
12	March 25, 2023	978-4-04-682325-0	September 16, 2025	978-1-9753-8791-4
13	July 25, 2023	978-4-04-682661-9	May 12, 2026	979-8-8554-0745-7
14	November 25, 2023	978-4-04-683079-1	February 9, 2027	979-8-8554-0747-1
15	April 25, 2024	978-4-04-683472-0	—	—
16	October 25, 2024	978-4-04-684172-8	—	—

=== Manga ===
A manga adaptation with art by Asuka Keigen was serialized in Kadokawa Shoten's Monthly Shōnen Ace magazine from November 26, 2019, to February 26, 2025. Ten tankōbon volumes were released from May 2020 to March 2025. At Sakura-Con 2022, Yen Press announced that they would also publish the manga in English.

No.	Original release date	Original ISBN	English release date	English ISBN
1	May 26, 2020	978-4-04-109444-0	November 22, 2022	978-1-9753-5081-9
2	October 26, 2020	978-4-04-109445-7	April 18, 2023	978-1-9753-5083-3
3	May 26, 2021	978-4-04-111370-7	August 22, 2023	978-1-9753-5085-7
4	October 26, 2021	978-4-04-111930-3	November 21, 2023	978-1-9753-5087-1
5	June 24, 2022	978-4-04-112631-8	April 16, 2024	978-1-9753-6636-0
6	March 25, 2023	978-4-04-113361-3	July 23, 2024	978-1-9753-9026-6
7	September 26, 2023	978-4-04-114115-1	October 15, 2024	979-8-8554-0668-9
8	December 26, 2023	978-4-04-114435-0	January 21, 2025	979-8-8554-0670-2
9	September 25, 2024	978-4-04-115291-1	December 16, 2025	979-8-8554-2033-3
10	March 24, 2025	978-4-04-116054-1	July 28, 2026	979-8-8554-3341-8

=== Anime ===
An anime television series adaptation was announced on October 21, 2021. It was produced by Passione and directed by animator and lecturer Hiroyuki Morita, with series composition and episode screenplays by Kunihiko Okada and character designs handled by Takayuki Noguchi and Satsuki Hayasaka. The series aired from October 3 to December 19, 2023, on TV Tokyo and BS Fuji. The opening theme song is "1000-nen Ai" (1000年愛; "Thousand Year Love") by Chiai Fujikawa, while the ending theme song is "Yururi" (ゆるり; "Leisurely") by Kaho, with their creditless versions being released through YouTube on October 24, 2023.

The series was simulcast through Bilibili in Southeast Asia, while Sentai Filmworks has licensed the series outside of Asia.

==== Episodes ====
No.	Title	Directed by (Note: Information is taken from the ending credits of each episode.)	Storyboarded by	Original release date (Note: Episodes are released on ABEMA Premium (Pay-per-view) a week before their air dates on television.)
1	"The Demon Lord Returns / The Undead King Ariseth"; Transliteration: "Maō Fukkatsu" (Japanese: 魔王復活)	Takahide Ejiri, Midori Yui	Hiroyuki Morita	October 3, 2023
2	"A Fate Borne / A Heavy Burden"; Transliteration: "Seowasareshi Unmei" (Japanese: 背負わされし運命)	Daiki Takemoto	Hideki Futamura	October 10, 2023
3	"An Awakening Soul / A Heavy Burden"; Transliteration: "Kakusei Suru Tamashī" (Japanese: 覚醒する魂)	Hito Tadano, Daiki Takemoto	Hiroaki Yoshikawa	October 17, 2023
4	"The Stirrings of a Bitter Grudge / An Old Grudge Stirs"; Transliteration: "Fukaki Ikon no Taidō" (Japanese: 深き遺恨の胎動)	Midori Yui	Midori Yui	October 24, 2023
5	"A Great Uproar / The Stampede"; Transliteration: "Dai Kyōsō" (Japanese: 大狂騒)	Hiroki Moritomo	Hiroki Moritomo, Kazuhiko Yokota, Daiki Takemoto, Takahide Ejiri, Hito Tadano	October 31, 2023
6	"The Demon Lord's Resolve / The Undead King's Resolve"; Transliteration: "Maō no Kakugo" (Japanese: 魔王の覚悟)	Yuta Kida	Hiroyuki Shimazu	November 7, 2023
7	"The Princess' Secret Feelings / Only the Princess Knows"; Transliteration: "Ōjo no Himeta Omoi" (Japanese: 王女の秘めた想い)	Hito Tadano	Hitoyuki Matsui	November 14, 2023
8	"A Bond Everlasting / The Ties that Bind"; Transliteration: "Sono Kizuna wa Kiezu" (Japanese: その絆は消えず)	Takahide Ejiri	Kunihisa Sugishima	November 21, 2023
9	"The City Ruins Appear / The Ruins Resurface"; Transliteration: "Haito Shutsugen" (Japanese: 廃都出現)	Hiroki Moritomo	Naotaka Hayashi	November 28, 2023
10	"The Elf Hero / The Brave Elf"; Transliteration: "Erufu no Yūsha" (Japanese: エルフの勇者)	Yuta Kida	Hitoyuki Matsui	December 5, 2023
11	"The Goddess' Voice / The Goddess Speaks"; Transliteration: "Megami no Koe" (Japanese: 女神の声)	Daiki Takemoto	Hiroyuki Shimazu	December 12, 2023 (Note: This episode aired at 1:40 a.m. JST, 10 minutes after the original air time on TV Tokyo.)
12	"The Truth behind the Demon Sword / The Demon Sword Gets Real"; Transliteration: "Maken no Shinjitsu" (Japanese: 魔剣の真実)	Takahide Ejiri, Hito Tadano	Kunihisa Sugishima	December 19, 2023

==== Music ====
Seiken Gakuin no Maken Tsukai Original Soundtrack CD

Film score by Yuji Nomi
- Released: February 28, 2024
- Studios: Sound City Azabudai; Sound City Setagaya
- Genre: Soundtrack
- Length: 63:39
- Label: Nippon Columbia

The series' score was composed by Yuji Nomi, who had previously collaborated with Morita for the 2002 film The Cat Returns and the 2007 series Bokurano. The soundtrack to the series was released on February 28 as part of the packaging for the series' 2nd volume Blu-ray release.

Track listing

All music is composed by Yuji Nomi.

No.	Title	Length
1.	"終戦"	2:47
2.	"不可思議"	1:50
3.	"1000年後の出会い"	1:58
4.	"ヴォイド"	1:30
5.	"第〇七戦術都市"	0:40
6.	"穏やかなひととき"	1:27
7.	"聖剣学院"	1:23
8.	"学院生活"	1:18
9.	"咲耶"	1:48
10.	"レオニスの審問"	0:44
11.	"思考"	1:27
12.	"荒野の勇者"	1:50
13.	"打開策"	0:44
14.	"賢者アラキール"	1:45
15.	"ヴォイド・ロード"	2:16
16.	"リーセリアの覚醒"	1:57
17.	"ダーイン・スレイヴ"	1:59
18.	"安らげる場所"	1:23
19.	"何気ない日々"	1:14
20.	"すれ違い"	0:58
21.	"レオ君"	1:25
22.	"王狼派の侵入"	0:47
23.	"予感"	1:29
24.	"悲しい過去"	1:12
25.	"反擊開始"	1:01
26.	"レギーナの秘密"	1:04
27.	"美しき記憶"	1:24
28.	"魔王の圧政"	1:03
29.	"素っ頓狂"	1:09
30.	"陽だまりの家"	1:03
31.	"懐かしい思い出"	1:39
32.	"アルーレ"	1:23
33.	"拮抗"	1:18
34.	"ネファケス"	1:51
35.	"一瞬即発"	1:34
36.	"交戦中"	1:37
37.	"悲劇"	1:36
38.	"クリスタリア騎士団"	1:38
39.	"聖女ティアレス"	2:10
40.	"一件落着"	1:35
41.	"レオニスとリーセリア"	2:49
42.	"シャーリ"	1:54
Total length:		63:39

==== Home media ====
The series was released by Nippon Columbia on Blu-ray in two volumes, the first on December 27, 2023, and the second on February 28, 2024. For the second volume, the soundtrack composed for the series by Yuji Nomi was included in the packaging.

In the United States, the entire series was released on Blu-ray on August 13, 2024, with the sole extras being the credit-less intro and outro.

== Reception ==
The first episode of the series received mixed reviews from Western critics.

Neil Lumbard of Blu-ray.com gave the series a positive review, praising its "fun energy", art style and Yuji Nomi's score. He stated that due to the involvement of Nomi and director Hiroyuki Morita, "Studio Ghibli fans will want to check out the series."
