= List of accolades received by Toshio Suzuki =

Toshio Suzuki accolades
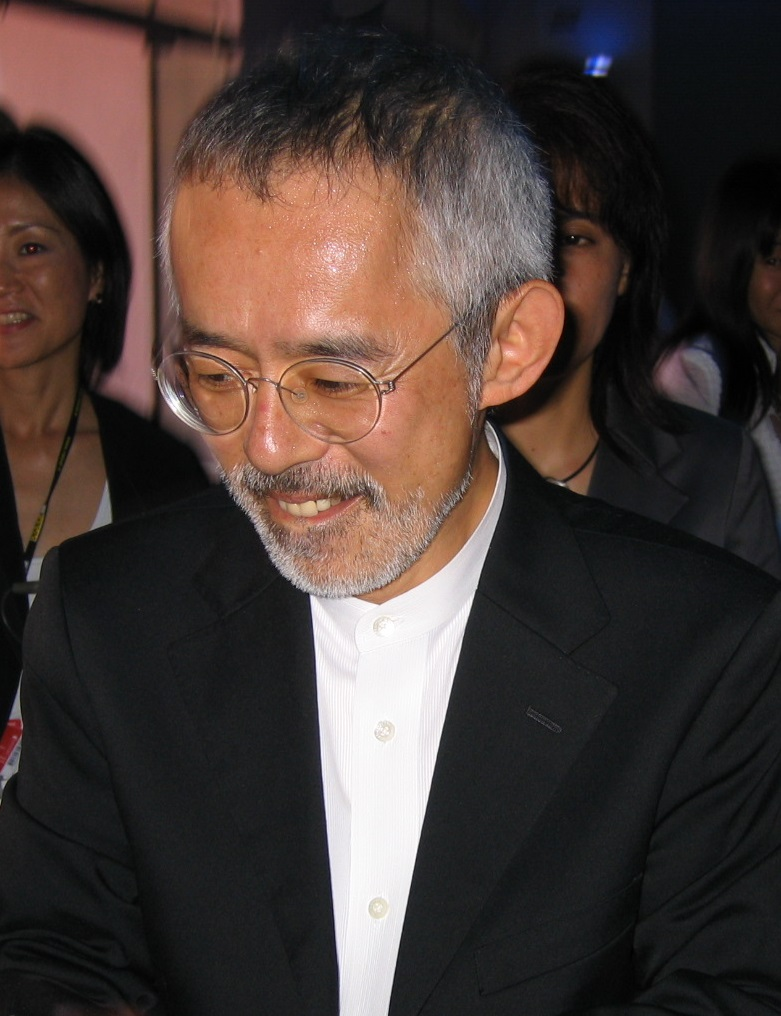
- Suzuki in 2004
Awards and nominations
Award	Wins	Nominations
Academy Awards	1	3
Agency for Cultural Affairs	1	1
Annie Awards	1	1
Asia Pacific Screen Awards	0	2
Association of Media in Digital Awards	2	2
British Academy Film Awards	1	2
Christopher Awards	1	1
Elan d'or Awards	1	1
Mainichi Film Awards	1	1
Producers Guild of America Awards	0	1
Tokyo Anime Award	1	1
WhatsOnStage Awards	0	1

Totals (Note: Certain award groups do not simply award one winner. They acknowledge several different recipients, have runners-up, and have third place. Since this is a specific recognition and is different from losing an award, runner-up mentions are considered wins in this award tally. For simplification and to avoid errors, each award in this list has been presumed to have had a prior nomination.)
- Wins: 10
- Nominations: 17

Toshio Suzuki (Japanese: 鈴木 敏夫, Hepburn: Suzuki Toshio; born August 19, 1948) is a Japanese film producer. Over the course of his career, Suzuki has received over 17 award nominations and has won 10. He has often been awarded for his work at Studio Ghibli – particularly alongside the director Hayao Miyazaki – including wins at the 2024 Academy Awards and British Academy Film Awards for The Boy and the Heron (2023). For his contributions across his career, he was presented the Lifetime Achievement Award at the 2021 Tokyo Anime Awards.

== Accolades ==
Accolades received by Toshio Suzuki
Award / Organization	Year	Category	Nominated works(s)	Result	Ref.
Academy Awards	2014	Best Animated Feature	The Wind Rises	Nominated (Note: Shared with Hayao Miyazaki)	
Academy Awards	2017	Best Animated Feature	The Red Turtle	Nominated (Note: Shared with Michaël Dudok de Wit)	
Academy Awards	2024	Best Animated Feature	The Boy and the Heron	Won (Note: Shared with Hayao Miyazaki. After Spirited Away (2001), also directed by Miyazaki and produced by Suzuki, the film is the second hand-drawn production to receive this award. It is also the first recipient to be rated PG-13.)	
Agency for Cultural Affairs	2014	Grand Prize	The Wind Rises and The Tale of the Princess Kaguya	Won	
Annie Awards	2022	Winsor McCay Award	—	Won	
Asia Pacific Screen Awards	2012	Best Animated Feature Film	From Up on Poppy Hill	Nominated	
Asia Pacific Screen Awards	2013	Best Animated Feature Film	The Wind Rises	Nominated	
Association of Media in Digital Awards	2002	Special Achievement Award	—	Won	
Association of Media in Digital Awards	2015	20th Anniversary Special Award	—	Won	
British Academy Film Awards	2004	Best Film Not in the English Language	Spirited Away	Nominated	
British Academy Film Awards	2024	Best Animated Film	The Boy and the Heron	Won (Note: It became the first Japanese-language film to receive the award.)	
Christopher Awards	2003	Feature Film	Spirited Away	Won (Note: Shared with Hayao Miyazaki (director, screenwriter); Yasuyoshi Tokuma, Takeyoshi Matsushita, Seiichiro Ujiie, Yutaka Narita, Koji Hoshino, Banjiro Uemura, Hironori Aihara (executive producers); Kirk Wise (U.S. director); Cindy Davis Hewitt, Donald H. Hewitt (U.S. screenwriters); Donald W. Ernst (U.S. producer); and John Lasseter (U.S. executive producer))	
Elan d'or Awards	2002	Best Producer	—	Won (Note: Shared with Takashi Ishihara and Yasuhiro Kan)	
Mainichi Film Awards	2024	Special Award	—	Won	
Producers Guild of America Awards	2024	Outstanding Producer of Animated Theatrical Motion Pictures	The Boy and the Heron	Nominated	
Tokyo Anime Award	2021	Lifetime Achievement Award	—	Won (Note: Shared with Momoko Sakura, Takao Koyama, Yoshiyuki Tomino, Toshitsugu Saida, Takeshi Seyama, Kayo Ishuu, and Michio Hazama)	
WhatsOnStage Awards	2023	Best Graphic Design	My Neighbour Totoro	Nominated (Note: Shared with Dewynters)	
