= Whisper of the Heart (2022 film) =

2022 film by Yūichirō Hirakawa

- Theatrical release poster
- Japanese: 耳をすませば
- Revised Hepburn: Mimi o Sumaseba
- Directed by: Yūichirō Hirakawa
- Screenplay by: Yūichirō Hirakawa
- Based on: Whisper of the Heart by Aoi Hiiragi
- Produced by: Asami Nishī; Hirotaka Arakaki; Yoshiya Nagasawa
- Starring: Nana Seino; Tori Matsuzaka
- Cinematography: Kōichi Nakayama
- Edited by: Makiko Yamaguchi
- Music by: Yū Takami
- Production company: Office Crescendo
- Distributed by: Sony Pictures Entertainment; Shochiku
- Release date: October 14, 2022
- Running time: 114 minutes
- Country: Japan
- Language: Japanese

Whisper of the Heart (Note: Japanese: 耳をすませば, Hepburn: Mimi o Sumaseba; lit. "If You Listen Closely") is a 2022 Japanese romantic drama film written and directed by Yūichirō Hirakawa based on the 1989 manga of the same name by Aoi Hiiragi. Co-distributed by Sony Pictures Entertainment and Shochiku, it takes place ten years after the original manga (as well as the 1995 animated film of the same name), and focuses on adult Shizuku and Seiji. The film stars Nana Seino and Tori Matsuzaka. Whisper of the Heart was released in Japan on October 14, 2022.

The film marked the first live-action film adaptation based on the manga.

== Premise ==
A 24-year-old Shizuku has given up her dreams as a novelist, but works hard at the children's book publishing company as an editor. On the other hand, Seiji still follows his dream abroad, even as the distance between him and Shizuku grows ever more.

== Cast ==
- Nana Seino as Shizuku Tsukishima
  - Runa Yasuhara as young Shizuku
- Tori Matsuzaka as Seiji Amasawa
  - Tsubasa Nakagawa as young Seiji
- Rio Uchida as Yūko Harada
  - Sara Sumitomo as young Yūko
- Yuki Yamada as Tatsuya Sugimura
  - Towa Araki as young Tatsuya

== Production ==
In January 2020, it was announced that a live-action film adaptation based on the Whisper of the Heart manga written and illustrated by Aoi Hiiragi was in the works. Yūichirō Hirakawa directed the film, with Sony Pictures Entertainment and Shochiku co-producing and distributing. Nana Seino and Tori Matsuzaka starred as Shizuku Tsukishima and Seiji Amasawa respectively. The film was inspired by the 1995 anime film adaptation produced by Studio Ghibli. Manga artist Aoi Hiiragi expressed her gratitude and excitement towards the live-action film. In June 2022, Yuki Yamada and Rio Uchida were cast as Tatsuya Sugimura and Yūko Harada respectively, while Towa Araki and Sara Sumitomo were to portray their younger selves.

Anne Watanabe provided the theme song for the film, "Tsubasa o Kudasai" (翼をください; lit. "Please Give Me Wings")

== Release ==
The film was first scheduled to release on September 18, 2020, but was delayed to October 14, 2022, due to the COVID-19 pandemic.

== Reception ==
=== Box office ===
The film debuted at number 4 out of top 10 in the Japanese box office in its opening weekend.

=== Critical reception ===
Mark Schilling from The Japan Times ranked the film 2 out of 5 stars, as he thought the film's target audience felt too domesticated. Alicia Haddick from Crunchyroll gave the film a mixed review, after offering high praise for the original Whisper of the Heart, she goes on to state that "The latest live-action incarnation is made worse by the potential of the story it could have told had they only chosen to follow through on something genuinely evolutionary, rather than nostalgic".
