= Hayao Miyazaki and the Heron =

2024 documentary film

- Directed by: Kaku Arakawa
- Release date: May 2024
- Running time: 120 minutes
- Country: Japan
- Language: Japanese

Hayao Miyazaki and the Heron (Japanese: 宮﨑駿と青サギと... ～「君たちはどう生きるか」への道～, Hepburn: Miyazaki Hayao to Aosagi to... ~"Kimitachi wa Dō Ikiru ka" e no Michi~) is a 2024 Japanese documentary film directed by Kaku Arakawa following the production of Hayao Miyazaki's film The Boy and the Heron (2023). Arakawa had previously directed documentaries on Miyazaki: Never-Ending Man: Hayao Miyazaki (2016) and 10 Years with Hayao Miyazaki (2019).

== Themes ==
The film documents the collaboration between Hayao Miyazaki and producer Toshio Suzuki, showcasing their dynamic that mirrors the relationship between the characters Mahito and the Heron.

The documentary also explores Miyazaki's confrontation with mortality. The film captures the director's grief over the loss of his mentor and rival Isao Takahata, and shows the physical changes in Miyazaki himself as he ages into his 80s. It also reveals Miyazaki's struggles during production, including moments of frustration where he questions his own abilities.

== Release ==
The documentary premiered at the 2024 Cannes Film Festival and was made available on multiple streaming platforms including Max, Amazon Prime, and Netflix in 117 countries. It was initially aired by NHK in 2023 before being re-edited for its Cannes premiere.
