= Takashi Tachibana (journalist) =

Japanese journalist (1940–2021)

- 立花 隆
- Born: 28 May 1940
- Died: 30 April 2021 (aged 80); Nagasaki, Japan
- Education: University of Tokyo
- Occupation: Journalist

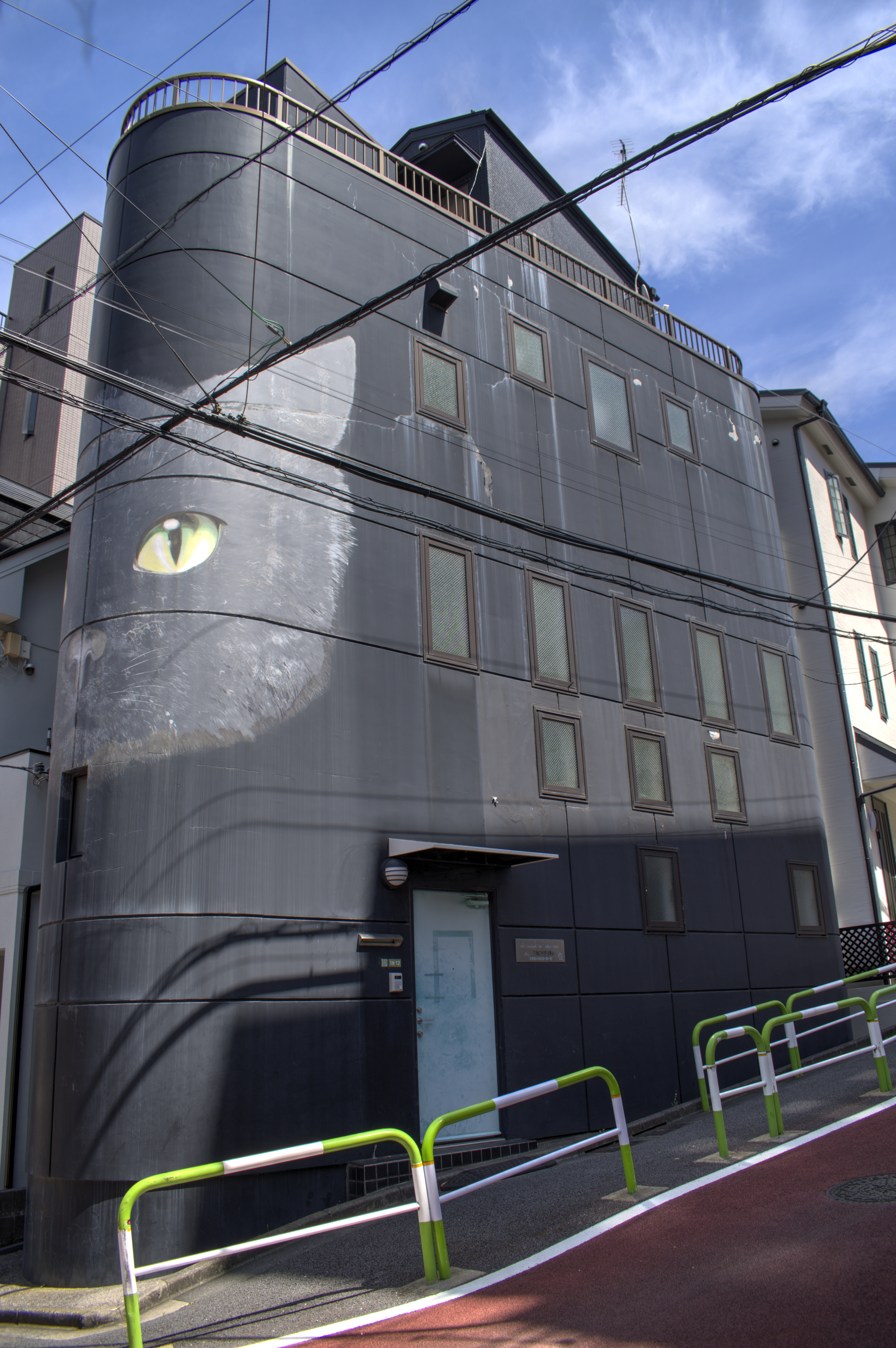
Tachibana's office in Koishikawa, Tokyo

Takashi Tachibana (立花 隆, Tachibana Takashi; 28 May 1940 – 30 April 2021, Nagasaki) was a Japanese journalist. He was known for his articles on Japanese social problems.

== History ==
Tachibana graduated from the University of Tokyo, majoring in French literature. At one point he served in the magazine Bungeishunjū; however, he only worked there for two years, quitting after being assigned to write articles about professional baseball. He returned to school at Tokyo University, during which time he wrote numerous nonfiction articles for the magazine Shokun!. Among the articles were ones on topics such as the Scientific Revolution, space travel, and crude oil. Because of his numerous works and essays, he was dubbed an "intellectual giant" by many in Japan.

He voiced Seiya Tsukishima in Whisper of the Heart.

== Death ==
Tachibana died April 30, 2021, due to acute coronary syndrome. His family made the announcement of his death on June 23, 2021.

== Notable issues ==
- Tanaka Kakuei Kenkyu (田中角栄研究, A Study of Kakuei Tanaka): 1974
- Lockheed Saiban to Sono Jidai (ロッキード裁判とその時代, Lockheed bribery scandals in 1970s and 1980s): 1981 to 1985
- Nihon Kyōsantō no Kenkyū (日本共産党の研究, A Study of the Japan Communist Party): 1978
- Nou wo Kiwameru (脳を究める, The Advanced Research of Neuro-Brain functions): 1996
- Tennou to Toudai, Dai Nippon Teikoku no sei to shi (天皇と東大 大日本帝国の生と死, The Emperor and the University of Tokyo, the end of the Empire of Japan in 1945)
