= On Your Mark (song) =

Single by Chage and Aska

from the album Code Name.2 Sister Moon
- A-side: "Heart / Natural / On Your Mark"
- Released: August 3, 1994
- Genre: Pop, rock
- Length: 19 minutes 28 seconds
- Label: Pony Canyon Inc.
- Songwriter: Ryō Asuka
- Producers: Chage & Aska and Go Yamazato

Chage and Aska singles chronology
"You can not go back to why"	"On Your Mark"	"Love Affair"

"On Your Mark" is a song by the Japanese rock duo Chage and Aska. The song was released in 1994 as part of the single Heart. It became a million selling hit single upon its release and has been performed in concert by the duo. The song has been included on a variety of their albums. Originally written with Japanese lyrics an English language adaptation was created and released under the title Castles in the Air. It was notably performed by Chage and Aska during their recorded MTV Unplugged session, the first such session by an act from Asia.

In 1995 a music video was created by Studio Ghibli. Hayao Miyazaki wrote and directed the animated short film as a side-project after having writer's block with Princess Mononoke. The short film, with the title Ghibli Experimental Theater On Your Mark was played in concert in June 1995 and had a theatrical release in July together with Whisper of the Heart.

== Song ==
"On Your Mark" is an original song created and released by the Japanese duo Chage and Aska. The music and lyrics were written by Aska. The original lyrics were written in Japanese. The title is based on the sports term on your mark, get set, go, a phrase used for the duo's 15th anniversary releases in 1994 and other promotional materials since then. The lyrics of the song were inspired by the lifestyle of the Japanese bubble economy. On August 3, 1994, the song was released as the third track on the Heart, Natural, On Your Mark Mini CD single for the Pony Canyon label. It reached number 1 on the Oricon Singles Chart upon its release. More than 1.1 million copies have been sold.

"On Your Mark" was used as the theme song for the 1994 "American Festival". The 1994 Festival was an event held, to reinforce Japan-U.S. ties, marking the 150th anniversary of the Convention of Kanagawa establishing Japan–U.S. relations.

== Releases ==
"On Your Mark" was first released as the third track on a CD single also featuring the songs Heart and Natural and appeared on the album Code Name. 2 Sister Moon. The song was included on several compilation albums. For the Japanese market on Chage and Aska Very Best Roll Over 20th and for international markets on Greatest Hits, The Best and Asian Communications.

== Live performances and recordings ==
"On Your Mark" was first performed live in concert at their fan club meeting, held at the Makuhari Messe in Chiba, for the Concert Tour '95~'96 Super Best 3 Mission Impossible on June 29, 1995 and continues to be included on set lists for Chage and Aska live performances. It has been recorded live and appears on their 25 Anniversary live album Chage and Aska Concert Tour 2004 - Two Five. Footage from the tour has been released on DVD and Blu-ray.

The original lyrics were written in Japanese. On July 8, 1996, a song with the same original music track but with English lyrics, credited to Aska and Ervin Bedward, was released under the title Castles in the Air on the album One Voice: The Songs of Chage and Aska. A compilation of their songs performed by the duo and other artists, including Maxi Priest featuring Shaggy, Lisa Stansfield, Chaka Khan, Michael Hutchence, Alejandro Sanz, Cathy Dennis, Apache Indian, Boy George, Richard Marx, Londonbeat, Marianne Faithfull and Wendy Matthews. Created with executive producer Safta Jaffery, released by EMI outside Japan for the international market. Castles in the Air was among the songs performed live for a recorded MTV Unplugged session, the first MTV Unplugged session by an act from Asia, released on CD, VHS and DVD.

== Credits ==
Vocals were performed by Chage and Aska with Tōru Hasebe on drums, Chiharu Mikutsuki on bass, Takumiichi Korenaga on acoustic and electric guitar, strings by Joe Strings. The synthesizer sound designer was Nobuhiko Nakayama. Taisuke Sawachika, who was the musician on acoustic piano and keyboards, also did the arrangement for the song. It was released on the Pony Canyon label.

== Music video ==
In 1994 Chage and Aska, through their agency Real Cast and the record company Pony Canyon, approached Studio Ghibli for the creation of a promotional video. The collaboration resulted in the animated short film Ghibli Experimental Theater On Your Mark. The film has been shown on stage at their concerts and had a theatrical release together with the animated Ghibli feature Whisper of the Heart.
