= Yuji Nomi =

Japanese composer (born 1958)

- 野見 祐二
- Born: July 19, 1958 (age 68); Tokyo, Japan
- Era: 20th Century, 21st Century
- Website: Official website

Yuji Nomi (野見 祐二, Nomi Yūji; born July 19, 1958 in Tokyo, Japan) is a Japanese composer. His work includes the Studio Ghibli films Whisper of the Heart (1995) and The Cat Returns (2002), as well as the Kyoto Animation television series Nichijou (2011). His mentor was Ryuichi Sakamoto, whom he helped with Royal Space Force: The Wings of Honnêamise and The Last Emperor (both 1987).

== Biography ==
Yuji Nomi was a keyboardist in a progressive rock band in junior high and high school. He dropped out of studying in the department of science and engineering while at Chuo University, after which he began to study painting. When a friend was asked to provide music to go along with an art display, Nomi composed the music. The composer Ryuichi Sakamoto liked his music and subsequently helped him release his first album, Oshare TV (おしゃれテレビ, Oshare Terebi), in 1986. He then collaborated with Sakamoto on multiple soundtracks, assisting with composing and arranging the soundtrack for The Adventures of Milo and Otis (1986), additional arrangement for music for The Last Emperor (1987), and arrangement and composition for Royal Space Force: The Wings of Honnêamise.

His first work for Studio Ghibli was the soundtrack for the animated feature Whisper of the Heart (1995), after which he worked on several different projects for them, including the short films Kujiratori (2001) and Koro no Daisanpo (2002), and the feature film The Cat Returns (2002).

== Filmography ==
=== Film ===
- The Adventures of Milo and Otis (1986, assistant composer and arranger)
- Royal Space Force: The Wings of Honnêamise (1987, arrangement and composition)
- The Last Emperor (1987, additional music arrangement and composition)
- Whisper of the Heart (1995, composer)
- Kujiratori (2001, composer)
- Koro no Daisanpo (2002, composer)
- The Cat Returns (2002, composer)
- Love Me, Love Me Not (2020)
- Totto-Chan: The Little Girl at the Window (2023)

=== Television ===
- Hanayome wa 16-sai! (1995)
- Doku (live-action, 1996)
- DxD (live-action, 1997)
- NHK Special: Uchu Michi éno Daikikou (documentary, 2001)
- Seizon Life (2002)
- Hannari Kikutaro (2002)
- NHK Special: Nankyoku Daikikou (documentary, 2003)
- Hannari Kikutaro 2 (2004)
- Phoenix (2004)
- Bokurano (2007)
- Nichijou (2011)
- Say "I Love You." (2012, composer)
- The Demon Sword Master of Excalibur Academy (2023)
- The Scent of the Wind (2026)

=== Games ===
- Mansion of Hidden Souls (1993) - Composer and arranger (one of three)
- Four-sight (1995) - Composer and arranger

== Discography ==
- Oshare TV (1986)
- Fantasia (1994)

=== Collaborations ===
- Fantastic World 11: Megumi Wakatsuki no Takarabune World (1987)
- Fantastic World 16: Please Save My Earth (1988)
- Fantastic World 18: Here Is Greenwood (1989)
- Wangan Trial Original Soundtrack (1997)

== Writings ==
"Nonki katsu Kakoku na Eiga-Ongaku" in Ozu Yasujiro Taizen (The Complete Book of Ozu Yasujiro) by Matsuura Kanji and Miyamoto Akiko (Asahi Shimbun Publications Inc. 2019) ISBN 9784022515995
