= Looking for a Home (film) =

- Japanese: やどさがし
- Directed by: Hayao Miyazaki
- Written by: Hayao Miyazaki
- Produced by: Toshio Suzuki
- Starring: Akiko Yano; Tamori
- Cinematography: Atsushi Okui
- Edited by: Takeshi Seyama
- Production company: Studio Ghibli
- Distributed by: Ghibli Museum
- Release date: January 2006
- Running time: 12 minutes
- Country: Japan
- Language: Japanese

Looking for a Home (やどさがし, Yadosagashi) (also known as House-hunting) is a 2006 Japanese short film written and directed by Hayao Miyazaki for Studio Ghibli.

The short film originally released on 3 January 2006, and is shown only in the Saturn Theater at the Ghibli Museum in Mitaka and in the Cinema Orion at the Ghibli Park near Nagoya, Japan.

During the 2024 Cannes Film Festival, it was shown outside Japan for the first and only time as part of the Studio Ghibli's Honorary Palme d'Or celebrations.

== Story ==
Fuki sets out with a big rucksack in high spirits on a journey to look for a new house. Along her way, Fuki encounters and befriends numerous manifestations of the natural world, from fish to insects to a kami who resembled Totoro. All the sound effects in this film were done by human voice. This short film contains little to no spoken Japanese, and the story is conveyed almost entirely through art and sound effects. Sound is also depicted on screen as animated writing. The original story and screenplay were written by Hayao Miyazaki.
