= On Your Mark (music video) =

1995 music video directed by Hayao Miyazaki

- The two men set the angel free and she flies off into the sky
- Directed by: Hayao Miyazaki
- Written by: Hayao Miyazaki
- Produced by: Toshio Suzuki
- Cinematography: Atsushi Okui
- Edited by: Takeshi Seyama
- Music by: Chage and Aska ("On Your Mark")
- Production company: Studio Ghibli
- Distributed by: Toho
- Release date: July 15, 1995; (with Whisper of the Heart)
- Running time: 7 minutes
- Country: Japan
- Languages: Japanese; English

Ghibli Experimental Theater On Your Mark (Japanese: ジブリ実験劇場 On Your Mark, Hepburn: Jiburi Jikkengekijō On Yua Māku) is a 1995 Japanese animated music video created by Studio Ghibli for the song "On Your Mark" (also released in English as "Castles in the Air") by the Japanese rock duo Chage and Aska. The song was released in 1994 as part of the single "Heart".

In 1995, Hayao Miyazaki wrote and directed the short film for the song as a side-project after having writer's block with Princess Mononoke. The anime music video is non-linear, providing multiple reiterations and alternate scenes to depict the events. The music video added sound effects to the audio track, but contains no dialogue. Miyazaki purposefully misinterpreted the lyrics to present his vision of a world where the surface becomes inhospitable and humans live in an underground city. He made the video cryptic to evoke creative interpretations among viewers.

The music video follows two policemen who raid and massacre a religious cult and find an angelic being, only to have her taken away and confined to a secure laboratory. Haunted by the fate of the angel, the two men formulate a plan and break into the laboratory. Fleeing in an armored truck, the three plummet into an abyss after trying to force past a police aircraft along a narrow, suspended roadway. After a montage of the previous scenes, the armored truck suddenly rockets into an apartment complex, allowing their escape. The three escape to the surface, ignoring the radiation and danger signs, emerging near an encased nuclear reactor. The two men set the angel free and she flies off into the sky.

The music video was well-received and praised for its animation and attention to detail. It premiered as a short before Studio Ghibli's Whisper of the Heart and has since been released on Laserdisc and DVD as part of the All Things Ghibli Special Short Short (Ghibli ga Ippai Special Short Short) compilation.

== Synopsis ==
The video begins with shots of a vacant village, overgrown with weeds, and the concrete sarcophagus of a covered-over nuclear reactor in the background. As the music begins, the scene changes to a sci-fi-style nighttime military-style police raid on a cult. Futuristic flying troop transports crash through the windows of a tower topped by gigantic neon-lit eyes and occupied by armed defenders. The policemen exchange gunfire and grenades with cultists whose hoods depict an enormous eye. As the victorious police begin to sort through the bodies of the cultists, two policemen find what appears to be a girl, lying unconscious, with large feathered wings on her back.

The scene changes again, now to bright daylight and blue sky. Two men are driving an old Alfa Romeo Giulietta Spider passo corto down an empty road. As one of the men helps the girl up, she spreads her wings and he holds her hands while she gains confidence. With a nudge she is airborne, but she seems hesitant and afraid as he lets go.

The scene changes back to the discovery of the girl in the tower, and the identity of the two policemen is revealed to be the same from the previous sequence. They carefully carry her out and offer her something to drink. A team of scientists wearing radiation suits arrive and quickly take the girl away.

The two men are haunted by the girl's fate and formulate a plan to rescue her. They break into the laboratory and free her from confinement, but the lab's alarms are triggered. The three escape in an armored truck and drive along a narrow suspended roadway over a domed city built in a crater. Police hovercraft are in pursuit, and one of them comes very low to the roadway to block the fugitives' truck. The roadway collapses when the protagonists try to force their way through, sending the truck plummeting. The winged girl refuses to let go of the hands of her rescuers, and the three fall into the abyss.

A brief montage of previous shots follows: the discovery of the girl, the girl flying through a blue sky, the two men rescuing the girl from the laboratory and stealing the truck, the truck plummeting amidst the wreckage of the roadway. But this time, the truck fires stabilizing thrusters and makes a short flight into the side of an apartment building. After their escape, the three are riding an old Alfa Romeo Giulietta Spider passo corto through a dark tunnel underneath signs which bear radiation symbols and read (in kanji) "Beware Of Sunlight" and "Survival Not Guaranteed". As they emerge into daylight, they drive past nuclear cooling towers and a sign which reads "Extreme Danger" and continue down the road.

One of the men helps the girl up, she spreads her wings and gives them a grateful smile; he kisses her hand, and the other winks in farewell. Soon, she is drifting upward into the sky. Briefly, a major urban cityscape is seen beyond the trees. The car veers off the road and slows to a stop in the grass.

== Production ==
The production of the music video began because Miyazaki was suffering from writer's block on Princess Mononoke and needed another project to distract him. Miyazaki wrote and directed the music video for "On Your Mark", although the song was previously released in 1994 as part of the single "Heart". Despite the popularity of the work, Toshio Suzuki told Helen McCarthy, the British author of numerous anime reference books, that Studio Ghibli had not given "100 percent" focus to the music video.

In the production of the music video, Miyazaki experimented with using computer animation to supplement traditional hand drawn cel-animation. At the time Studio Ghibli did not have its own computer department and the work was outsourced to CG Production Company Links, under supervision of Hideki Nakano, Silicon Graphics, Softimage 3D, and Alias Research. Techniques learned in the experimentation for On Your Mark were later adopted for the creation of Princess Mononoke. Animation director was Masashi Andō. Long time Miyazaki collaborator Michiyo Yasuda was in charge of colour selection. Backgrounds were created by Kazuo Oga. Yōji Takeshige made his debut as art director. There is no dialogue in the music video and the two policemen are loosely modeled after Chage and Aska.

== Analysis ==
Miyazaki offered an interpretation of the angel as "Hope" and to protect hope could paradoxically mean "to let it go where no-one can touch it". Miyazaki said that in the music video's setting, humans live in an underground city after the surface of the Earth has been contaminated with radiation, creating a sanctuary for nature. Miyazaki did not find this believable, though, as humanity would suffer on the surface instead. Miyazaki intentionally misinterpreted the lyrics to reflect upon the vision of a world filled with disease and radiation and people's reactions to that world. He implied the two policemen might not be able to return to their old life, but offered no reason as to why.

Miyazaki referred to the angelic creature as "tori no hito" or "a bird's person" which is the nickname of Nausicaä from his Nausicaä of the Valley of the Wind manga and film.

During their April 1999 lecture series on manga, anime and the works of Miyazaki at the University of Dallas, Pamela Gossin, Professor of Arts and Humanities, and guest instructor Marc Hairston, research scientist in the William B. Hanson Center for Space Sciences, discussed On Your Mark in their lecture, "In the Coda On Your Mark and Nausicaa, and drew parallels to the Nausicaä story, its titular character and its conclusion. Gossin and Hairston interpreted the release of the winged girl at the end of the video as Miyazaki setting free his character in a manner reminiscent of William Shakespeare's symbolic liberation of his characters, through Prospero's release of his servant Ariel in his play The Tempest. The final volume of the Nausicaä manga was released in January 1995. Miyazaki started creating On Your Mark that same month.

McCarthy highlighted similarities to different works and real life found throughout the film, remarking that the opening city sequence could be an homage to Akira or Blade Runner and the attack on the religious cult could be a reflection of the Aum Shinrikyo movement. Nausicaa.net stated the production occurred prior to the police raid following the Sarin gas attack on the Tokyo subway in March 1995. McCarthy also noted that the film's scientists' decontamination gear look like the hero of Porco Rosso and the rescue scene is reminiscent of Princess Leia in Star Wars. The encased or "box" structure in the film is an homage to the Chernobyl Nuclear Power Plant which was entombed in concrete following the Chernobyl disaster.

The animation scholar Seiji Kanō observed that the urban settings have a China Town style and resemble the cityscapes of Mamoru Oshii's Ghost in the Shell animated film adaptation, in production at the time. While Miyazaki has been non-committal about the nature of his winged entity in On Your Mark, Kanō noted that the manga Seraphim 266613336Wings, an unfinished collaborative effort by Oshii and Satoshi Kon, with its Angel Disease theme, was still serialized in Animage at the time Miyazaki was creating On Your Mark in 1995.

== Reception ==
The music video was well received. Dr. Patrick Collins, a science writer, called it "the most perfect short science fantasy film I've ever seen." McCarter of EX Magazine praised the film's attention to detail that brought the world to life. THEM Anime praised the music video and said that it alone was worth the price of Ghibli ga Ippai Special Short Short.

== Releases ==
The music video was released theatrically with Whisper of the Heart on July 15, 1995. Chage and Aska also used the film in concerts. The first official screening took place at their fan club concert, held at the Makuhari Messe in Chiba, on June 29, 1995. Beginning July 5, 1995, the video was shown for the performance of the song during the Super Best 3 Mission Impossible tour. Featuring the same melody but different lyrics than "On Your Mark", "Castles in the Air" was included on the English-language album One Voice: The Songs of Chage & Aska.

On April 10, 1996, during an airing on Channel 4 as part of Four-Mations.

The music video was later released on VHS and Laserdisc by Pony Canyon on July 25, 1997, due to popular demand.

On November 15, 2005, it was included on Buena Vista Home Entertainment's "Ghibli ga Ippai Special Short Short" DVD, where it can be played with either the original "On Your Mark" or "Castles in the Air" songs.

It was planned to be included on the "Hayao Miyazaki Collection", but after Aska (Shigeaki Miyazaki) of the musical duo Chage and Aska was arrested for drug possession, Walt Disney Studios Japan removed On Your Mark from the upcoming DVD/Blu-ray box set containing Hayao Miyazaki's works, delayed the release by two weeks in order to remove the video and ceased shipments of Ghibli ga Ippai Special Short Short.

On October 27, 2014, Studio Ghibli's Toshio Suzuki announced on the company's web page that they and Disney had re-considered the situation and would be sending out Blu-ray discs to purchasers of the Hayao Miyazaki box set, as long as they could provide proof of purchase. These standalone releases were self-distributed by Studio Ghibli for this reason.

On April 10, 2019, Walt Disney Japan announced the Blu-ray and DVD release of Ghibli ga Ippai Special Short Short 1992-2016, an expanded edition of Ghibli ga Ippai Special Short Short that includes titles released after 2005. On Your Mark is on the disc, and it was released on July 17, 2019.
