= Aoi Hiiragi =

Japanese manga artist

Aoi Hiiragi 柊 あおい
- Born: 22 November 1962 (age 64) Kamifukuoka, Saitama Prefecture, Japan
- Notable works: Whisper of the Heart

Aoi Hiiragi (柊 あおい, Hiiragi Aoi; born November 22, 1962) is a Japanese manga artist who grew up in Mibu. She is best known for her Whisper of the Heart manga, and the film based on it.

== Life and work ==
Hiiragi was born in Fukuoka (which became Kamifukuoka in 1972 and then Fujimino in 2005), Saitama Prefecture, Japan, and grew up in Mibu, Tochigi.

She made her manga debut with Cobalt Blue no Hitoshizuku in the manga magazine Ribon Original in 1984. She created a number of other manga over the next two decades, including Hoshi no Hitomi no Silhouette and Gin'iro no Harmony.

She currently resides in Hakodate, Hokkaidō.

=== Whisper of the Heart ===
Hiiragi's most widely known work is Whisper of the Heart, a manga which was later made into an anime film by Studio Ghibli. A number of its characters made its way into other stories and into popular culture. The protagonist of the film was the inspiration for Lofi Girl, whose first iteration was based closely on a still from the film.

Studio Ghibli commissioned another story from Hiiragi involving the cats as more central characters, which became Baron, Neko no Danshaku, also released as The Cat Returns, a spin off title of Whisper of the Heart.

== Bibliography ==
=== Manga ===
==== Series ====
- Hoshi no Hitomi no Silhouette (Ribon, 1985–1989)
  - Hoshi no Hitomi no Silhouette Bangaihen
  - Oinari-san Dai Panic (Ribon, 1988)
  - Engage (Ribon Original, 1991)
  - Engage II
  - Hoshikuzu Serenade (2018)
- Whisper of the Heart (Ribon, 1989)
  - Mimi wo Sumaseba: Shiawase na Jikan (Ribon Original, 1995; released the year of the film)
- Gin'iro no Harmony (Ribon, 1990–1992)
- Step (Ribon, 1993)
- Peppermint Graffiti (Ribon Original, 1994)
- Yuki no Sakura no Ki no Shita de... (Bouquet, 1997)
- Smile! (Margaret, 1998)
- Yume no Machi: Neko no Danshaku (Margaret, 2002)
- Kono Machi de Kimi ni (Margaret, 2002)
- "Okaa-san" no Jikan

==== One-shots ====
- Campus Sketch
- Cobalt Blue no Hitoshizuku (her debut work)
- Harukaze no Melody
- Hajimemashite
- Joshikō no Okite
- Kikyou no Saku Goro
- Kisetsu no Shiori
- Kono Machi de Anata ni ( & Issho ni & Kimi ni )
- Mahō no Toketa Princess
- Naimono Nedari (1 &2)
- Otome Gokoro·Yume Gokoro
- Shōjo Shōkei
- Spring!
- Yuki no Sakura no Ki no Shita de...
- Yume no Kaori no Tea Time

=== Films ===
- Whisper of the Heart (1995)
- The Cat Returns (2002)

=== Books ===
- Baron: The Cat Returns (2002), a children's book
- Sora no Eki [The Cat Returns] (2002), a picture book

=== Albums ===
- Hoshi no Hitomi no Silhouette Image album (Warner/Pioneer, 1987)
