= Bokurano =

Japanese manga series

- Bokurano: Ours
- First tankōbon volume cover, featuring Takashi Waku (right), Aiko Tokosumi (center), and Masaru Kodaka (left), with Zearth behind

ぼくらの (Bokurano)
- Genre: Mecha; Psychological horror; Thriller
- Manga
- Written by: Mohiro Kitoh
- Published by: Shogakukan
- English publisher: NA: Viz Media
- Imprint: Ikki Comix
- Magazine: Monthly Ikki
- Original run: November 25, 2003 – June 25, 2009
- Volumes: 11
- Anime television series
- Directed by: Hiroyuki Morita; Kazuyoshi Yaginuma (Note: Chief unit director)
- Music by: Yuji Nomi
- Studio: Gonzo
- Licensed by: NA: Discotek Media
- Original network: SUN-TV, Tokyo MX TV, TV Aichi, TV Kanagawa
- Original run: April 8, 2007 – September 25, 2007
- Episodes: 24
- Light novel

Bokurano: Alternative
- Written by: Renji Ōki
- Illustrated by: Mohiro Kitoh
- Published by: Shogakukan
- Imprint: Gagaga Bunko
- Original run: May 24, 2007 – June 18, 2008
- Volumes: 5
- icon

Bokurano: Ours (ぼくらの, Bokurano) is a Japanese manga series written and illustrated by Mohiro Kitoh. It was serialized in Shogakukan's seinen manga magazine Monthly Ikki from November 2003 to June 2009, with its chapters collected in 11 tankōbon volumes. It is about a group of middle-school students who, under the pretense of participating in a game, agree to the task of piloting a giant mecha in a series of battles where the survival of Earth is dependent on their continuing to win, and they gradually realise how high are the stakes of this supposed game.

The series was adapted as an anime television series directed by Hiroyuki Morita and produced by Gonzo that aired from April to September 2007, and a 2007–2008 light novel series, Bokurano: Alternative, with an alternative story by Renji Ōki and character designs by Kitoh himself. The manga is licensed in English by Viz Media, which began serializing it in the online English version of Ikki in July 2009; the first print volume was published in February 2010.

By November 2009, the manga had over one million copies in circulation. In 2010, Bokurano received the Excellence Award in the Manga Division at the 14th Japan Media Arts Festival.

== Plot ==
During a summer camp, 15 children (8 boys and 7 girls) find a grotto by the sea. Deep within, they discover working computers and some electronic equipment, and later the owner, a man who introduces himself as "Kokopelli". Kokopelli claims to be a programmer working on a brand new game, in which a large robot has to defend the Earth against fifteen alien invasions. He persuades the children to test the game and enter into a contract. Fourteen of them agree, but one of them is kept from entering the contract by her older brother, and a moment later they all mysteriously awaken on the shore, believing what happened was just a dream.

That night, two giant robots appear by the beach. A small creature calling himself "Koyemshi" also appears and claims to be the children's guide. He then teleports them into the black robot, with Kokopelli already inside and controlling the black robot in order to defeat the white enemy robot. During battle, he gives the children a brief tutorial on how to pilot the robot as he destroys the enemy. Once he has finished, he tells the children that they are on their own now and sends them back to the beach. As the children are teleported out, one child observes Kokopelli whispering "I'm sorry".

Takashi Waku is the first pilot of the robot, which is named "Zearth" by Maki Ano. Upon winning the fight, Waku is accidentally 'knocked' into the sea from a ledge on Zearth's chest by Jun. The second pilot, Masaru "Kodama" Kodaka, dies unceremoniously after defeating his opponent. Koyemshi explains to the children that Zearth runs on life force, and the cost of every victory would be the life of its pilot. It is also revealed that Waku fell into the sea after getting 'knocked' by Jun because Zearth had drained his life force; he was already dead.

Thus, the children must now defend the world and face the many trials and tribulations of doing so, including the fact that ultimately none of them will get out of this situation alive.

== Media ==
=== Manga ===
Bokurano, written and illustrated by Mohiro Kitoh, was serialized in Shogakukan's seinen manga magazine Monthly Ikki from November 25, 2003, to June 25, 2009. Shogakukan collected its chapters in eleven tankōbon volumes, released from June 30, 2004, to December 26, 2009.

In North America, the manga was licensed for English release by Viz Media, which began serializing it in the online English version of Ikki on July 23, 2009. The eleven volumes were published from February 16, 2010, to September 16, 2014.

It was also licensed in French by Asuka, in Italian by Kappa Edizioni, in South Korea by Daiwon C.I., and in Taiwan by Ever Glory Publishing.

A companion to the series, Bokurano Official Book (ぼくらの, BOKURANO OFFICIAL BOOK), was published by Shogakukan on January 30, 2008.

=== Anime ===
An anime television series adaptation was directed by Hiroyuki Morita and produced by Gonzo. It was broadcast in Japan from April 8 to September 25, 2007, on Sun TV and Tokyo MX, as well as other stations. Episodes were released in Japan on eight DVDs between July 25, 2007, and March 26, 2008. On September 4, 2014, North American anime licensor, Discotek Media announced their license to the anime with an English subtitled DVD release in 2015.

The original soundtrack is by Yūji Nomi. The opening theme was "Uninstall" (アンインストール, An'insutōru), and the ending themes were "Little Bird" (episodes 1–12) and "Vermillion" (episodes 13–24), all performed by Chiaki Ishikawa.

Regarding differences between the stories in the manga and in the anime, Hiroyuki Morita, who directed the series, wrote in his blog that he dislikes the original story and has, in some ways, been making changes to the plot for that reason. He also wrote that, at one point early in the development of the show, he asked manga author Mohiro Kitoh if he could find some way to save the main characters — the kids who must pilot Zearth. He wrote that Kitoh responded that his choice was fine as long as the changes did not involve "magical solutions" to the story. Morita closed out the blog entry with the statement "The director of the animated version of Bokurano dislikes the original manga. From here on out, you can't expect the animated version to expand on what you might find appealing in the original. So, fans of the original, please do not watch the animated version from now on".

=== Light novel ===
Bokurano was adapted as a light novel series entitled Bokurano: Alternative (ぼくらの〜alternative〜, Bokura no Orutanatibu). Five volumes written by Renji Ōki with illustrations by Mohiro Kitoh were published by Shogakukan between May 2007 and June 2008. This series has a different storyline and includes new characters alongside those from the manga.

No.	Release date	ISBN
1	May 24, 2007	978-4-09-451008-9
Prologue; 1. "The Teacher" (≪教師≫, "Kyōshi"); 2. "Kozue" (コズエ); 3. "Kako" (カコ); 4. "Tsubasa" (ツバサ); Commentary (Mohiro Kitoh)
2	July 18, 2007	978-4-09-451020-1
5. "Waku" (ワク); 6. "Chizu" (チズ); 7. "Kirie" (キリエ)
3	September 19, 2007	978-4-09-451026-3
8. "Kodama" (コダマ); 9. "Mako" (マコ); 10. "Anko" (アンコ)
4	December 18, 2007	978-4-09-451041-6
11. "Komo – Kana" (1) (コモ・カナ （1）); 12. "Komo – Kana" (2) (コモ・カナ （2）); 13. "Maria" (マリア); Bokurano Backstage Revealed
5	June 18, 2008	978-4-09-451075-1
14. "Kanji" (カンジ); 15. "Miku" (ミク); Epilogue: "Ushiro" (ウシロ); Crossed interview: Mohiro Kitoh × Renji Ōki

=== Live-action series ===
In May 2019, it was revealed that Hyde Park Entertainment is developing a live-action series adaptation of the manga. Charlie Craig to be showrunner and executive producer. Ashok Amritraj, will be executive producer, along with Rob Golenberg. Addison Mehr and Priya Amritraj will co-executive produce for Hyde Park.

== Reception ==
Bokurano was awarded the Excellence Award in the Manga Division at the 14th Japan Media Arts Festival in 2010. By November 2009, the manga had over 1 million copies in circulation.
