= Hiroyuki Morita =

Japanese animator and director (born 1964)

- Born: June 26, 1964 (age 62); Fukuoka Prefecture, Japan
- Education: Fukuoka University
- Occupations: Animator, storyboard artist and anime director
- Years active: 1987–present
- Employers: Shaft (1987~1988); Polygon Pictures (2014~2017); Nippon Engineering College (teacher)
- Notable work: The Cat Returns

Hiroyuki Morita (森田 宏幸, Morita Hiroyuki; born June 26, 1964) is a Japanese animator and director. He is best known for working as director on the Studio Ghibli film The Cat Returns.

== Life and career ==
=== Early life ===
Morita was born in Fukuoka Prefecture and graduated from Fukuoka Kenritsu Chikushikoto School. During his high school days, he produced an independent animated film called Glass-wari Shōnen (ガラスわり少年, The Glass-Breaking Boy), which won a prize in an animation magazine contest at the time. One of the production staff members for the film was Katsuyuki Toda, who later became a manga artist.

=== Animation career ===
After graduating from the Department of Mechanical Engineering, Faculty of Engineering at Fukuoka University, he joined the animation production company Shaft. His first work as an animator was Hiatari Ryōkō!. Afterwards, he became a freelancer and worked as an inbetweener on movies such as Akira and Kiki's Delivery Service, a key animator for Roujin Z, Hashire Melos!, Memories, Perfect Blue and many others, and an episode director for the OVA Golden Boy. Being an animator who cares about fundamentals, Morita even danced the choreography for the idols in Perfect Blue.

Other Studio Ghibli productions he has worked on include My Neighbors the Yamadas and Koro no Daisanpo, a short film for the Ghibli Museum. This led to him being selected to direct The Cat Returns. In 2007, he directed his first TV series, Bokurano: Ours.

On February 27, 2011, he was elected as director for the Japanese Animation Creators Association. He retired in June 2015 after serving on the board of directors for approximately four years.

Until mid-2017, he worked at Polygon Pictures, a digital animation production company, and was involved in the management of ACTF, a forum themed around digital animation. He is currently working as a freelancer.

==== Controversy ====
During the production of the anime adaptation of Bokurano, Morita posted progress reports and held Q&A sessions about the aired episodes on his blog. There were various comments from the viewers such as criticism, support and inquiries. On the same blog, Morita stated, "I dislike the original work, and I admit that I made some malicious changes to the original when making it into an animation." In response to this, not only did viewers criticize the adaptation of Bokurano, but many also criticized Morita himself.

Later, Morita explained, "The word 'dislike' that I used towards the original work was misleading so I'll correct myself. The original manga is good and full of mysteries, and I think it was worth adapting. I wrote that I 'disliked' the original story simply because there was so much mystery there, and because of the hardships involved. I was wrong to easily blame my personal 'dislike' and 'malice' for the criticisms written about the quality of my work. There is no escaping the fact that we have our own interpretation of the greatest mystery of all: why do the children die."

In a Monthly Ikki magazine interview with the original author Mohiro Kitoh, Morita said, "I was half-forced to say [that I 'dislike' it]," to which Kitoh replied, "I'm sure you were (laughs)" and "On the contrary, you've shown some good stuff (laughs)."

Secondary Perpetration Issue Regarding DJ SODA's Sexual Victimization

In response to DJ Soda's performance on the third day of MUSIC CIRCUS'23 on August 13, 2023, and sexual victimization by an audience member, he wrote on X (formerly Twitter), "I guess the sexual victimization DJ SODA is talking about is a public type of enticement. She says that if you are seduced and befriended, someone will come along later to scare you. The organizers of the music festival should not be complicit in her art," he tweeted (later deleted), drawing criticism from the Korean media.

== Filmography ==
=== TV anime ===
- Hiatari Ryōkō! (1987) - in-between animation
- Lupin III: Bye Bye Liberty Crisis (1989) - key animation
- Famous Dog Lassie (1996) - key animation
- Rurouni Kenshin (1996–1998) - opening key animation
- The Adventures of Mini-Goddess (1998) - storyboard
- Master Keaton (1998) - key animation
- Texhnolyze (2003) - key animation
- Planetes (2004) - key animation
- Paranoia Agent (2004) - key animation
- Koi Kaze (2004) - storyboard
- Uninhabited Planet Survive! (2004) - storyboard
- Monster (2004–2005) - storyboard, key animation
- Noein: To Your Other Self (2006) - storyboard
- Witchblade (2006) - storyboard
- Bokurano: Ours (2007) - director, storyboard, episode director, key animation
- Dennō Coil (2007) - key animation
- Himitsu – Top Secret (2008) - storyboard, opening key animation
- Black Butler (2009) - storyboard
- Birdy the Mighty (2009) - storyboard
- Valkyria Chronicles (2009) - storyboard
- Umineko When They Cry (2009) - storyboard
- Transformers: Animated (season 3) (2009) - storyboard
- Anohana: The Flower We Saw That Day (2011) - storyboard
- Bunny Drop (2011) - storyboard
- Working!! (2011) - storyboard
- Inu × Boku SS (2012) - storyboard
- Episode of Luffy: Adventure on Hand Island (2012) - director, storyboard, unit director (with Mitsuru Hongō)
- Knights of Sidonia (2014) - storyboard
- Knights of Sidonia: Battle for Planet Nine (2015) - storyboard
- Ajin: Demi-Human (2016) - storyboard
- The Reflection (2017) - storyboard
- Just Because! (2017) - storyboard
- Attack on Titan (2018) - storyboard
- Gleipnir (2020) - storyboard
- The Demon Sword Master of Excalibur Academy (2023) - director
- Akane-banashi (2026) - storyboard

=== OVA ===
- Record of Lodoss War (1990) - key animation
- JoJo's Bizarre Adventure (1993–1994) - key animation
- Golden Boy (1995–1996) - storyboard, episode director

=== Film ===
- Akira (1988) - in-between animation
- Kiki's Delivery Service (1989) - in-between animation
- Roujin Z (1991) - key animation
- Hashire Melos! (1992) - key animation
- Memories (1995) - key animation
- Perfect Blue (1998) - key animation
- Spriggan (1998) - key animation
- My Neighbors the Yamadas (1999) - key animation
- Tenchi Forever! The Movie (1999) - storyboard, unit director, key animation
- Koro no Daisanpo (2002) - key animation
- The Cat Returns (2002) - director
- Ghost in the Shell 2: Innocence (2004) - key animation
- Keroro Gunsō the Super Movie (2006) - key animation
- Tales from Earthsea (2006) - key animation
- Doraemon: Nobita's Great Battle of the Mermaid King (2010) - key animation
- Doraemon: Nobita and the New Steel Troops—Winged Angels (2011) - key animation
- One Piece 3D: Mugiwara Chase (2011) - storyboard cooperation
- Fullmetal Alchemist: The Sacred Star of Milos (2011) - key animation
- Doraemon: Nobita and the Island of Miracles—Animal Adventure (2011) - key animation
- A Letter to Momo (2012) - key animation
- The Tale of the Princess Kaguya (2013) - key animation
- Hakuoki: Warrior Spirit of the Blue Sky (2014) - key animation
- Knights of Sidonia (2015) - storyboard production
- Ajin: Demi-Human (2015) - storyboard
- Godzilla: Planet of the Monsters (2017) - assistant director, storyboard
- Godzilla: City on the Edge of Battle (2018) - assistant director, storyboard
- Pokémon the Movie: The Power of Us (2018) - storyboard
- NiNoKuni (2019) - assistant director, unit director
