= Kujiratori =

2001 Japanese animated short film

- Directed by: Hayao Miyazaki
- Written by: Hayao Miyazaki
- Based on: No No Nursery School and Kujiratori by Rieko Nakagawa & Yuriko Yamawaki
- Produced by: Toshio Suzuki
- Starring: Keito Ishihara Mao Onodera Di-Zhi Wang
- Edited by: Takeshi Seyama
- Music by: Yuji Nomi
- Production company: Studio Ghibli
- Distributed by: Ghibli Museum
- Release date: 2001
- Running time: 16 minutes
- Language: Japanese

Kujiratori (くじらとり; lit. 'Whale Hunt') is a 2001 Japanese animated short film written and directed by Hayao Miyazaki, shown only in the Ghibli Museum in Mitaka, Japan. The film has a running time of 16 minutes. It is drawn in a different, simpler style compared to other Studio Ghibli films and uses bright pastel colors.

Kujiratori tells the story of school children pretending they are building a boat. As imagination replaces reality, they find themselves on the ocean, hunting for a whale. A big, gentle whale appears, accompanies them back to land and plays with them. Then the fantasy ends and the children are back in their class room.

The film was shown at the 2002 New York International Children's Film Festival. It won the Ōfuji Noburō Award at the 2001 Mainichi Film Awards.
