= Toshio Suzuki =

Japanese film producer (born 1948)

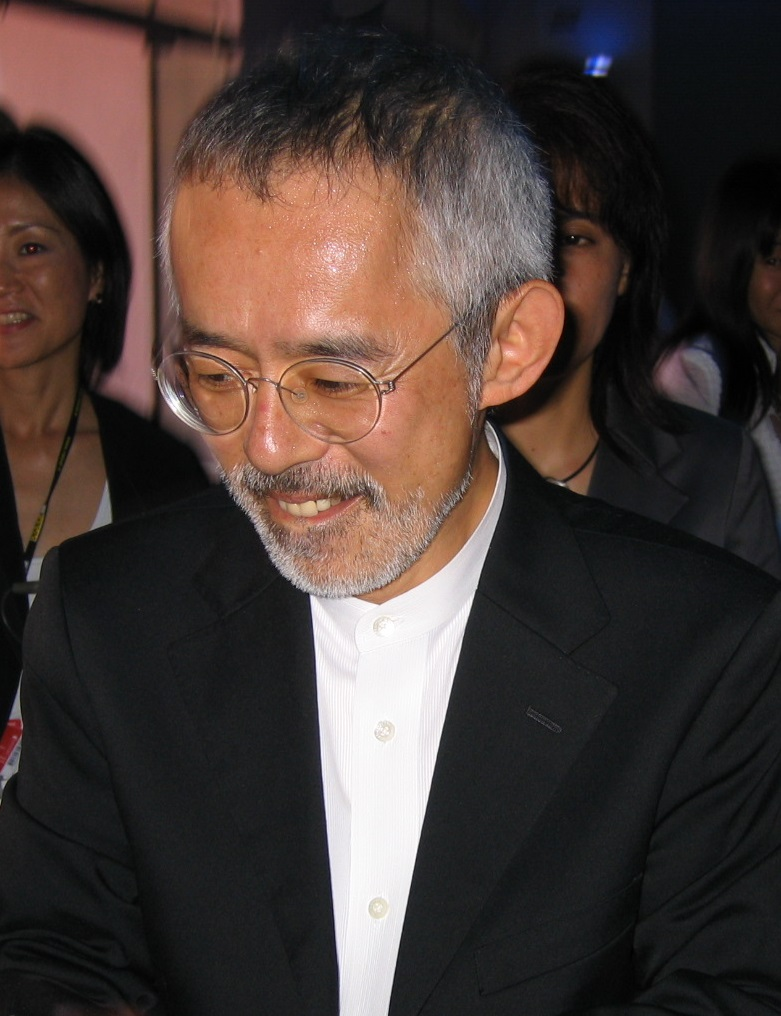
- Suzuki at the Venice premiere of Howl's Moving Castle in 2004
- Born: August 19, 1948 (age 78); Nagoya, Aichi, Japan
- Education: Keio University
- Occupations: Film producer; Co-Founder and chairman of Studio Ghibli
- Years active: 1972–present
- Employers: Tokuma Shoten (1972–1989); Studio Ghibli (1989–present)

Toshio Suzuki (Japanese: 鈴木 敏夫, Hepburn: Suzuki Toshio; born August 19, 1948) is a Japanese film producer and studio executive. He is a co-founder and the current chairman of Studio Ghibli. He began his career at Tokuma Shoten, working as a magazine editor and covering manga and animation, before becoming editor of Animage, where he established professional relationships with Hayao Miyazaki and Isao Takahata. After co-founding Studio Ghibli, he served on the production committees of several of its early films, including Nausicaä of the Valley of the Wind, My Neighbor Totoro, and Grave of the Fireflies.

Suzuki has served as producer or co-producer on numerous Ghibli films, including Kiki's Delivery Service, Only Yesterday, Porco Rosso, Princess Mononoke, Spirited Away, Howl's Moving Castle, Earwig and the Witch, and The Boy and the Heron. He officially retired from his producer role in 2014, becoming general manager, but has remained involved in the studio's management and creative activities. In 2023, following the acquisition of Studio Ghibli by Nippon Television Holdings, Suzuki became chairman.

== Early life ==
Toshio Suzuki was born in Nagoya in Aichi Prefecture in 1948. He developed an early interest in literature and the arts, which led him to pursue higher education in the humanities. In 1967, Suzuki enrolled at Keio University, one of Japan's leading private universities, where he studied literature. He completed his degree in 1972, graduating with a Bachelor of Arts in literature.

== Career ==
=== 1970s: Tokuma Shoten ===
Suzuki began his professional career at Tokuma Shoten shortly after graduating from university. He was assigned to the planning department of Asahi Geino, an entertainment magazine, where he was responsible for the manga coverage pages. During this period, he had a long-anticipated meeting with cartoonist Shigeru Sugiura.

In 1973, Suzuki became the editor of the magazine's supplement Comic & Comic (コミック&コミック, komiku & komiku). Through his work on the magazine, he collaborated with and befriended film directors such as Sadao Nakajima, Eiichi Kudo and Teruo Ishii, as well as animators and manga artists including Osamu Tezuka, George Akiyama, Kazuo Kamimura, Hōsei Hasegawa and Shotaro Ishinomori. During a hiatus in the publication of the comic supplement, Suzuki was reassigned to the performing arts feature section of Asahi Geino, where he covered a wide range of topics, including bōsōzoku (Japanese motorcycle gangs), and the bombing of the headquarters of Mitsubishi Heavy Industries by the East Asia Anti-Japan Armed Front. He later mentioned actress Sayuri Ichijō as a particularly memorable person from this period.

In 1975, Suzuki was transferred to the editorial department of the monthly magazine Television Land. Among the series he worked on was Wakusei Robo Danguard Ace. In 1978 he became an editor for the newly established monthly magazine Animage, working under its first editor-in-chief, Hideo Ogata.

=== 1976–1984: Pre-Ghibli ===
In his capacity as Animage, Suzuki approached Isao Takahata and Hayao Miyazaki—who had previously worked together on the animated feature film Horus, Prince of the Sun—to request a feature article for the magazine's inaugural issue but they declined. Suzuki and Miyazaki encountered each other again following the release of The Castle of Cagliostro, when Suzuki once more approached Miyazaki for an Animage article. This time, the meetings resulted in the beginning of a long-term collaborative relationship.

In July 1981 Suzuki unsuccessfully pitched Miyazaki's original concept for an animated story, Warring States Demon Castle (戦国魔城, Sengoku ma-jō). Instead Suzuki published the article, Hayao Miyazaki, World of Romance and Adventure (宮崎駿 冒険とロマンの世界, Miyazaki Hayao bōken to roman no sekai), in the August 1981 issue of Animage magazine. Reflecting on the issue, Suzuki later stated: "here is where it all started".

Suzuki was among those who facilitated the creation and publication of Miyazaki's manga, Nausicaä of the Valley of the Wind (1982–1994). Along with the publisher Tokuma Shoten, he assisted with the production of its animated adaptation (1984), and helped establish Studio Ghibli following the film's release on March 11, 1984.

=== 1985: Beginning of Studio Ghibli ===
Studio Ghibli was founded in June 1985. In 1985, Suzuki was also involved in the theatrical release of Kunihiko Yuyama's GoShogun: The Time Étranger, which premiered on April 24. The following year, he served on the production committee for the Studio Ghibli film Laputa: Castle in the Sky on behalf of Tokuma Shoten; the film was released in August 1986. In October of that year, Suzuki succeeded Hideo Ogata as editor-in-chief of Animage.

In 1988, Suzuki again served on Tokuma Shoten's production committee. This time for two Ghibli films released as a double feature: My Neighbor Totoro, directed by Miyazaki, and Grave of the Fireflies, directed by Takahata. Suzuki played a key role in securing the films' production and theatrical release by proposing the double-feature format. He later served as associate producer on Kiki's Delivery Service and officially joined Studio Ghibli as a producer in 1989, following his resignation from Tokuma Shoten in October of that year.

In 1990, Suzuki was appointed director of Studio Ghibli. He served as producer on Only Yesterday (1991) and Porco Rosso (1992). He oversaw the television project Ocean Waves, directed by Tomomi Mochizuki, which aired in Japan in 1993. The following year, Suzuki produced Takahata's theatrical feature Pom Poko. In 1995, he produced Whisper of the Heart, directed by Yoshifumi Kondō as well as On Your Mark, a short animated promotional film for the Japanese pop-duo Chage and Aska; the two works were released theatrically together.

In 1995, Suzuki also became producer of the next feature-length Studio Ghibli project, which was released in 1997 under the title Princess Mononoke, a name he selected. In the same year, Studio Ghibli merged with Tokuma Shoten, and Suzuki became the inaugural President. 1999, he produced Takahata's My Neighbors the Yamadas.

In 2000, Suzuki produced the live-action film Shiki-Jitsu, directed by Hideaki Anno. Studio Ghibli's animated feature Spirited Away premiered on July 20, 2001, and the Ghibli Museum opened in October of the same year. In 2002, The Cat Returns, directed by Hiroyuki Morita, and Ghiblies episode 2, directed by Yoshiyuki Momose, were released theatrically. In 2003, Spirited Away won the Academy Award for Best Animated Feature. Suzuki served as producer on Mamoru Oshii's Innocence, released in March 2004, and later that year on Howl's Moving Castle, which premiered in November.

=== 2004: Independent ===
In March 2004, Studio Ghibli became independent from Tokuma Shoten and Suzuki was appointed president of the studio. He stepped down from the position in 2008. As of 2014, Suzuki continued to serve as a managing director of Studio Ghibli and remained active as a film producer.

=== 2014–2025: Retirement and continuation ===
In March 2014, Suzuki retired from his role as a producer and assumed the position of general manager at Studio Ghibli. Despite stepping back from day-to-day production duties, he continued to be involved in major projects, serving as a co-producer on The Red Turtle (2016) and as lead producer on Earwig and the Witch (2020) and The Boy and the Heron (2023).

In October 2023, Studio Ghibli was acquired by Nippon Television Holdings and underwent corporate restructuring, becoming a subsidiary of the broadcaster. Following the acquisition, Suzuki became chairman of Studio Ghibli, continuing to play a role in the studio's management and production activities as it entered a new organizational phase.

== Legacy ==
The animation scholar Rayna Denison argued the Suzuki was "instrumental ... in the creation of Studio Ghibli as Japan’s most successful animation studio."Hayao Miyazaki has stated, "If it were not for Mr. Suzuki, there wouldn't have been Studio Ghibli." Fellow co-founder Isao Takahata, who served as producer on the Nausicaä of the Valley of the Wind, likewise acknowledged Suzuki's pivotal role in bringing the Nausicaä manga to publication and used similar language to credit Suzuki's essential contribution to the creation of Studio Ghibli. Takahata also credited Suzuki for his steadfast support of Miyazaki and cited Suzuki's role in sustaning his long-standing friendship with him.

== Accolades ==
Accolades received by Toshio Suzuki
Award / Organization	Year	Category	Nominated works(s)	Result	Ref.
Academy Awards	2024	Best Animated Feature	The Boy and the Heron	Won (Note: Shared with Hayao Miyazaki. After Spirited Away (2001), also directed by Miyazaki and produced by Suzuki, the film is the second hand-drawn production to receive this award. It is also the first recipient to be rated PG-13.)	
Agency for Cultural Affairs	2014	Grand Prize	The Wind Rises and The Tale of the Princess Kaguya	Won	
British Academy Film Awards	2024	Best Animated Film	The Boy and the Heron	Won (Note: It became the first Japanese-language film to receive the award.)	
Elan d'or Awards	2002	Best Producer	—N/a	Won (Note: Shared with Takashi Ishihara and Yasuhiro Kan)	
Mainichi Film Awards	2024	Special Award	—N/a	Won	
Tokyo Anime Award	2021	Lifetime Achievement Award	—N/a	Won (Note: Shared with Momoko Sakura, Takao Koyama, Yoshiyuki Tomino, Toshitsugu Saida, Takeshi Seyama, Kayo Ishuu, and Michio Hazama)	

== Filmography ==
Year	Title	Japanese name	Role(s)
1984	Nausicaä of the Valley of the Wind	風の谷のナウシカ	Production committee
1985	GoShogun: The Time Étranger	戦国魔神ゴーショーグン 時の異邦人	Publication producer
1986	Castle in the Sky	天空の城ラピュタ	Production committee
1987	Digital Devil Story: Megami Tensei	デジタル・デビル物語 ストーリー 女神転生	Producer
1988	Grave of the Fireflies	火垂るの墓	Production committee
1988	Legend of the Galactic Heroes: My Conquest Is the Sea of Stars	銀河英雄伝説: わが征くは星の大海	Publication producer
1988	My Neighbor Totoro	となりのトトロ	Production committee
1989	Kiki's Delivery Service	魔女の宅急便	Associate producer
1991	Only Yesterday	(おもひでぽろぽろ	Producer
1991	The Heroic Legend of Arslan	アルスラーン戦記	Producer
1992	Porco Rosso	紅の豚	Producer
1993	Ocean Waves	海がきこえる	Producer
1994	Pom Poko	平成狸合戦ぽんぽこ	Producer
1995	On Your Mark	オン・ユア・マーク	Producer
1995	Whisper of the Heart	耳をすませば	Producer, character
1997	Princess Mononoke	もののけ姫	Producer
1999	My Neighbors the Yamadas	ホーホケキョとなりの山田くん	Producer
2000	Ghiblies	ギブリーズ	Producer
2000	Shiki-Jitsu	式日	Producer
2001	Recess: School's Out	リセス ぼくらの夏休みを守れ!	Producer, uncredited
2001	Spirited Away	千と千尋の神隠し	Producer
2002	Ghiblies Episode 2	ギブリーズ二	Producer
2002	The Cat Returns	猫の恩返し	Producer
2003	Killers: .50 Woman	キラーズ	"Wicked producer"
2004	Howl's Moving Castle	ハウルの動く城	Producer
2004	Innocence: Ghost in the Shell	攻殻機動隊 イノセンス	Producer
2006	Tachiguishi-Retsuden	立喰師列伝	Hiyashi Tanuki no Masa
2006	Tales from Earthsea	ゲド戦記	Producer
2008	Ponyo on the Cliff by the Sea	崖の上のポニョ	Producer
2010	The Secret World of Arrietty	借りぐらしのアリエッティ	Producer
2011	From Up on Poppy Hill	コクリコ坂から	Producer
2013	The Kingdom of Dreams and Madness	夢と狂気の王国	Himself
2013	The Wind Rises	風立ちぬ	Producer
2014	When Marnie Was There	思い出のマーニー	Executive Producer
2016	The Red Turtle	レッドタートル ある島の物語	Producer
2016	Garm Wars: The Last Druid	ガルム・ウォーズ	Producer (Japanese dub)
2017	Mary and the Witch's Flower	メアリと魔女の花	With appreciation to
2020	Earwig and the Witch	アーヤと魔女	Producer
2023	The Boy and the Heron	きみたちはどういきるか	Producer

== Publications in English ==
- Suzuki, Toshio (2018). Mixing Work with Pleasure: My Life at Studio Ghibli (First English ed.). Tokyo: Japan Publishing Industry Foundation for Culture. ISBN 978-4-86658-022-7.
