= Whisper of the Heart =

1995 Japanese animated film directed by Yoshifumi Kondō

- Theatrical release poster
- Kanji: 耳をすませば
- Revised Hepburn: Mimi o Sumaseba
- Directed by: Yoshifumi Kondō
- Screenplay by: Hayao Miyazaki
- Based on: Mimi o Sumaseba by Aoi Hiiragi
- Produced by: Toshio Suzuki
- Starring: Yōko Honna; Issey Takahashi; Takashi Tachibana; Shigeru Muroi; Shigeru Tsuyuguchi; Keiju Kobayashi
- Cinematography: Atsushi Okui
- Edited by: Takeshi Seyama
- Music by: Yuji Nomi
- Production company: Studio Ghibli
- Distributed by: Toho
- Release date: July 15, 1995
- Running time: 111 minutes
- Country: Japan
- Language: Japanese
- Box office: ¥3.15 billion (Japan)

Whisper of the Heart (Note: Japanese: 耳をすませば, Hepburn: Mimi o Sumaseba; lit. 'If You Listen Carefully') is a 1995 Japanese animated coming-of-age drama film with romantic elements directed by Yoshifumi Kondō and written by Hayao Miyazaki, based on Aoi Hiiragi's 1989 manga Mimi o Sumaseba. Produced by Studio Ghibli and distributed by Toho, the film stars Yoko Honna, Issey Takahashi, Takashi Tachibana, Shigeru Muroi, Shigeru Tsuyuguchi and Keiju Kobayashi.

Whisper of the Heart was Kondō's only film as director before his death in 1998. Studio Ghibli had hoped that Kondō would become the successor to Miyazaki and Isao Takahata.

A spin-off film, The Cat Returns, was released in 2002, which focused on a minor character of the film, the Baron.

== Plot ==
Shizuku Tsukishima is an impulsive but well read and creative young girl that is a student at Mukaihara Junior High School, where she is best friends with Yūko Harada. She lives in Tokyo with her parents Asako and Seiya and older sister Shiho, and is keen on creative writing. One evening, she looks through the checkout cards in her library books and discovers they were all checked out previously by someone named Seiji Amasawa.

Over the next few days, she encounters a boy who annoys her by teasing her about "Concrete Roads", a set of original lyrics describing Tama New Town that Shizuku based on the song "Take Me Home, Country Roads". Finding a cat riding a train, Shizuku follows it to discover an antique shop run by Shirō Nishi. In the shop is a cat statuette nicknamed The Baron. Shizuku is ecstatic about finding "a place where stories begin".

Shizuku later encounters the boy again at the antique shop. He lets her inside to show her the Baron, who has unique "sparkling" emerald green eyes, and says his grandfather will never sell him. He shows her the workshop downstairs, where she discovers that he is learning to make violins to pursue his dream of becoming a master luthier. She begs him to play the violin for her, and he agrees, but on the condition that she sings along. The pair perform "Take Me Home, Country Roads". Mr. Nishi and his friends join in. The boy is revealed to be Seiji, Nishi's grandson, and Shizuku and Seiji finally befriend each other.

Seiji admits that he admires Shizuku's talents and that he had been checking out a large number of books in the hopes that she would eventually notice him. Days after, Seiji leaves for Cremona, Italy for a two-month study with a master violin-maker. Inspired by him pursuing his dream, Shizuku decides to pursue her writing seriously during the two months. She asks Nishi if she can write a story featuring the Baron, to which Nishi grants his consent in exchange for being the first to read her story.

Shizuku concocts a fantasy story featuring herself as the protagonist, the Baron as the male hero looking for his lost love, Louise, and the cat from the train (a neighborhood stray who is, among other names, known as "Moon" and "Muta") as the antagonist. Devoting her time to her writing, Shizuku stays up until early in the morning, and her school grades drop. She argues with her family over her grades and future. As she continues to push herself, her anxiety mounts.

When her story is complete, Nishi reads it and tells her that her story is not bad, but raw and heartfelt. Shizuku bursts into tears as the stress of the last two months turns into relief. Nishi consoles her and tells her the real-life story of the Baron. When he studied in Germany in his youth, he found his first love, a woman named Louise. Nishi discovered the twin statuettes of the Baron and his female companion in a cafe, but as the female one was away for repairs, the shopkeeper would only allow Nishi to buy the Baron if Louise agreed to hold onto its companion so they could be reunited. However, the two lovers and their cat statues were separated during World War II. Nishi did go back to Germany when the war ended, but as his search for Louise and the Baroness turned up nothing, he never saw them again.

Deciding she needs to learn more about writing, and that she wants to attend high school, Shizuku announces to her mother that she will resume studying for her high school entrance exams. The next morning, she wakes up and sees Seiji outside on his bicycle, having returned a day earlier. Seiji tells Shizuku he will return to Cremona after completing high school in Tokyo.

The two ride Seiji's bike to a lookout and watch the sunrise, where Seiji professes his love for Shizuku and proposes that they marry in the future; she happily accepts.

== Voice cast ==
Character name		Voice actor	
English	Japanese	Japanese	English
Shizuku Tsukishima	Tsukishima Shizuku (月島 雫)	Yōko Honna	Brittany Snow
Seiji Amasawa	Amasawa Seiji (天沢 聖司)	Issey Takahashi	David Gallagher
Asako Tsukishima (Shizuku's mother)	Tsukishima Asako (月島 朝子)	Shigeru Muroi	Jean Smart
Seiya Tsukishima (Shizuku's father)	Tsukishima Seiya (月島 靖也)	Takashi Tachibana	James Sikking
Shiho Tsukishima (Shizuku's sister)	Tsukishima Shiho (月島 汐)	Yorie Yamashita	Courtney Thorne-Smith
Baron Humbert von Gikkingen	Funberuto fon Jikkingen danshaku (フンベルト・フォン・ジッキンゲン男爵)	Shigeru Tsuyuguchi	Cary Elwes
Shirō Nishi (Seiji's grandfather)	Nishi Shirō (西 司朗)	Keiju Kobayashi	Harold Gould
Yūko Harada	Harada Yūko (原田 夕子)	Maiko Yoshiyama	Ashley Tisdale
Ms. Kōsaka	Kōsaka-sensei (Japanese: 高坂先生)	Minami Takayama	Vicki Davis

== Production ==
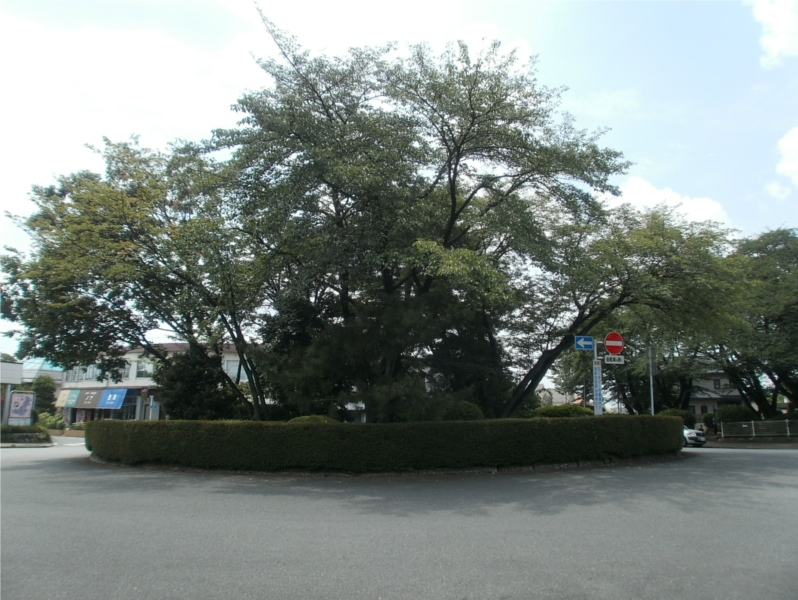
Sakuragaoka Park (Tama, Tokyo)

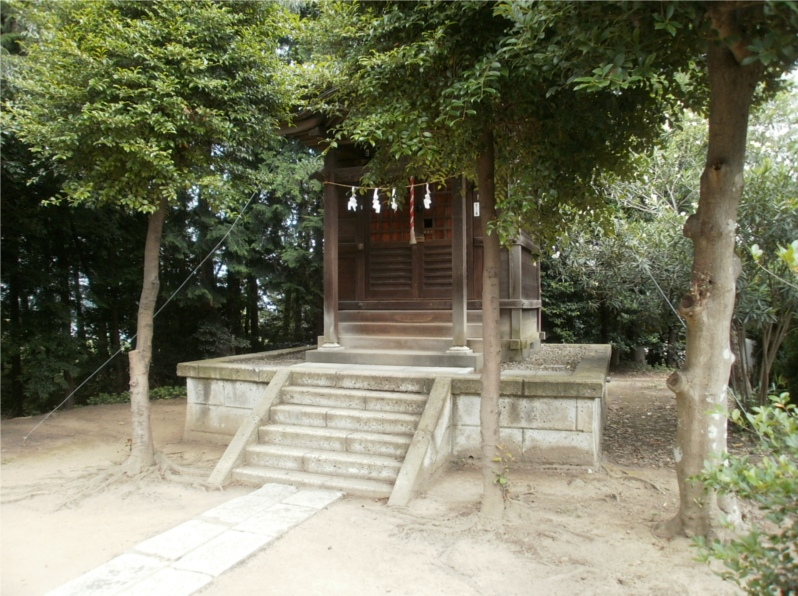
Konpira in SakuraOka (Tama, Tokyo)

Whisper of the Heart was based on the manga Mimi o Sumaseba which was originally created by Aoi Hiiragi. The manga was serialized in Shueisha's shōjo manga magazine Ribon between August and November 1989, and a single tankōbon volume was released on February 20, 1990. The volume was reprinted on July 15, 2005. A second manga by the same author titled Mimi o Sumaseba: Shiawase na Jikan was serialized in Shueisha's Ribon Original in August 1995 and released in a single volume on February 20, 1996. A spin-off of Mimi o Sumaseba, titled Baron: Neko no Danshaku, was published in March 2002, and an animated film based on that story was released in July 2002 under the name The Cat Returns.

During production, the backgrounds in the fantasy sequences of the film were drawn by Naohisa Inoue and the woodcut of the imprisoned violin-maker was created by Miyazaki's son Keisuke Miyazaki, a professional engraver. The flying scene with the Baron received heavy involvement from Miyazaki, and made use of digital composition.

Take Me Home, Country Roads (in Japanese) A musical clip with the film's Shizuku singing the song with Seiji. Composer: Yuji Nomi Author: Hayao Miyazaki Singer: Yōko Honna

The film score of Whisper of the Heart was composed by Yuji Nomi. At times during the film, Shizuku translates John Denver's 1971 song "Take Me Home, Country Roads" to Japanese for her school's chorus club. She writes her own humorous Japanese version of the song, called "Concrete Road", about her hometown in western Tokyo. The songs were actually translated by producer Toshio Suzuki's daughter Mamiko with Hayao Miyazaki writing supplemental lyrics. These songs play a role at points in the story, reflecting "Shizuku's character arc and inner conflict." A recording of "Take Me Home, Country Roads", performed by Olivia Newton-John, plays during the film's opening sequence. The song was also performed by Shizuku's voice actress Yoko Honna.

== Release ==
Whisper of the Heart was released in Japan on July 15, 1995, as the first film in the country to use the Dolby Digital sound format. It was shown alongside the music video On Your Mark for the song by Chage and Aska. The film was released on VHS and Laserdisc by Tokuma Shoten in January 1996, and the VHS was later reissued by Buena Vista Home Entertainment Japan on July 25, 1997, as part of the "Ghibli ga Ippai" series. The movie later saw a DVD release on May 21, 2002, and was soon reissued again with a new HD master by Disney on April 20, 2022.

On July 20, 2011, Walt Disney Studios Japan released the movie on Blu-Ray.

=== English dub release ===
An English dub of this film began to be produced by Walt Disney Pictures in 2003, but it would not be released until March 7, 2006, when it came out on DVD. According to Disney producer Rick Dempsey, the production was halted in 2003 due to difficulties in licensing "Take Me Home, Country Roads" and Studio Ghibli's request to change the release order of their films. Turner Classic Movies televised both the dubbed and subbed versions on January 19, 2006 as part of their month-long celebration of Miyazaki in honor of his birthday, January 5.

The English title, Whisper of the Heart, was created by Studio Ghibli and used on merchandise released around the time of the film's release in Japan.

The North American Blu-ray was released by Walt Disney Studios Home Entertainment on May 22, 2012, alongside Castle in the Sky and The Secret World of Arrietty. GKIDS & Shout! Factory re-issued the film on Blu-ray and DVD on January 16, 2018, under a new deal with Studio Ghibli.

A newly restored 4K edition of Whisper of the Heart is slated to screen exclusively in IMAX across the United States and Canada, beginning on April 21, 2026.

== Reception ==
Whisper of the Heart was the highest-grossing Japanese film on the domestic market in 1995, earning ¥1.85 billion in distribution income, and grossing ¥3.15 billion in total box office revenue. It grossed $34.9 million worldwide.

The review aggregator Rotten Tomatoes reported that 95% of critics have given the film a positive review based on 19 reviews, with an average rating of 7.8/10. On Metacritic, the film has a weighted average score of 75 out of 100 based on 4 critic reviews, indicating "generally favorable reviews". Time Out London included Whisper of the Heart in their Top 50 Animated Film list. It was also included in Film4's Top 25 Animated Film list. On Anime News Network, Michael Toole gave it an overall grade of A−, calling it "beautiful and evocative; a fine tale of adolescent yearning and aspiration."

== Adaptations ==
Over the course of the film, Shizuku is working on a fantasy novel that revolves around a cat figurine, named The Baron, which she discovers in Mr. Nishi's antique store. In 2002, Studio Ghibli produced a spin-off film titled The Cat Returns, directed by Hiroyuki Morita and again featuring The Baron, and the stray cat, Muta, in the film.

In January 2020, Sony Pictures Entertainment announced that there would be a live-action film sequel. The film stars Nana Seino as Shizuku and Tori Matsuzaka as Seiji. Yūichirō Hirakawa directed the film. It was released on October 14, 2022, after being postponed from its original release date of September 2020 due to the COVID-19 pandemic.
