= The Cat Returns =

2002 Japanese animated film directed by Hiroyuki Morita

- Theatrical release poster

Japanese name
- Kanji: 猫の恩返し
Transcriptions
- Revised Hepburn: Neko no Ongaeshi
- Directed by: Hiroyuki Morita
- Screenplay by: Reiko Yoshida
- Based on: Baron the Cat by Aoi Hiiragi
- Produced by: Toshio Suzuki; Nozomu Takahashi
- Starring: Chizuru Ikewaki; Yoshihiko Hakamada; Tetsu Watanabe; Yosuke Saito; Aki Maeda; Tetsurō Tamba
- Cinematography: Kentaro Takahashi
- Edited by: Megumi Uchida
- Music by: Yuji Nomi
- Production company: Studio Ghibli
- Distributed by: Toho
- Release date: July 20, 2002
- Running time: 75 minutes
- Country: Japan
- Language: Japanese
- Budget: $20 million
- Box office: $65 million

The Cat Returns (Note: Japanese: 猫の恩返し, Hepburn: Neko no Ongaeshi; lit. 'The Cat's Repayment') is a 2002 Japanese anime fantasy film directed by Hiroyuki Morita from a screenplay by Reiko Yoshida, based on the 2002 manga Baron the Cat by Aoi Hiiragi. It was animated by Studio Ghibli for Tokuma Shoten, Nippon Television Network, Hakuhodo, Buena Vista Home Entertainment, Mitsubishi and Toho, and distributed by the latter company. It stars Chizuru Ikewaki, Yoshihiko Hakamada, Tetsu Watanabe, Yosuke Saito, Aki Maeda and Tetsurō Tamba. This is Hiroyuki Morita's first and only film as director for Studio Ghibli.

It is a spin-off of Whisper of the Heart. It was theatrically released in Japan on July 20, 2002, through Toho and in 2005 in the United States through Walt Disney Home Entertainment. It received generally favourable reviews, and won the Excellence Prize at the 2002 Japan Media Arts Festival. GKIDS re-issued the film on Blu-ray and DVD on January 16, 2018, under a new deal with Studio Ghibli.

== Plot ==
Haru Yoshioka is a shy but noble high school student who has a suppressed ability to talk with cats. One day, she saves a cat from being hit by a truck on a busy road. The cat she saved turns out to be Lune, Prince of the Cat Kingdom. As thanks, the cats give Haru unwanted gifts such as catnip and mice, and she is offered the Prince's hand in marriage. Her mixed reply is taken as a yes.

Wanting none of this, Haru hears a kind female voice which tells her to seek out Muta, a large white cat, and to get directions to the Cat Bureau from him. Muta leads her there to meet Baron Humbert von Gikkingen (the same Baron from Whisper of the Heart), who is a cat figurine given life by the work of his artist, and Toto, a stone raven who comes to life much like Baron. Soon after meeting them, Haru and Muta are forcefully taken to the Cat Kingdom, leaving Toto and Baron in the human world to follow the group from the air. They find the entrance to the Cat Kingdom on Earth: five lakes forming a cat's paw.

Haru is treated to a feast at the castle of the Cat King. She begins to slowly turn into a cat with fangs, whiskers, a tan tail and paws, and a cat's ears and nose, though she still remains mostly human. The King hopes that she will make a suitable bride for the Prince. At the feast, Baron (in disguise) dances with Haru as part of the entertainment. He reveals to her that the more she loses herself in the kingdom, the more cat-like she will become, and that she has to believe in herself. When Baron is discovered and forced to fight the guards, he and Haru are helped by Yuki, a white cat maiden in the palace who had previously tried to warn Haru to leave the Cat Kingdom. After Yuki shows them an escape tunnel, Haru, Baron, and Muta move through a maze to a tower that contains a portal to Haru's world. The King goes through a series of efforts to keep them in the kingdom long enough for Haru to remain trapped in her cat form; his ultimate plan is to force her to become his daughter-in-law.

Prince Lune and his guards return to the Cat Kingdom, revealing that the King was not acting on his behalf and that he plans on proposing to Yuki. Muta reveals himself to be Renaldo Moon, a notorious criminal in the Kingdom who devoured a whole lake of fish in one sitting. Haru learns that the strange voice who had advised her to go to the Cat Bureau was Yuki's. In her childhood, Haru had saved Yuki from starvation by giving her the fish crackers she was eating, and thus, Yuki has now repaid her kindness. After she rejects the King's marriage proposal outright, Muta tells Haru, "I respect a woman who stands up for herself," and proceeds to help her escape from the King's soldiers.

Eventually, Baron, Haru, and Muta escape the Cat Kingdom with the aid of Prince Lune and Toto, and Haru embraces her true self. She tells Baron how much she has come to like him. He tells her the doors of the Cat Bureau will be open for her again if the need ever arises. Haru returns to the human world with more self-confidence; after learning from her friend, Hiromi, that her former crush has broken up with his girlfriend, she simply replies, "It doesn't matter anymore."

== Voice cast ==
Character	Voice actor	
Character	Japanese	English
Haru Yoshioka	Chizuru Ikewaki	Anne Hathaway
Baron Humbert von Gikkingen	Yoshihiko Hakamada	Cary Elwes
Muta / Renaldo Moon	Tetsu Watanabe	Peter Boyle
Toto	Yōsuke Saitō	Elliott Gould
The Cat King	Tetsurō Tanba	Tim Curry
Prince Lune	Takayuki Yamada	Andrew Bevis
Yuki	Aki Maeda	Judy Greer
Natori	Kenta Satoi	René Auberjonois
Natoru	Mari Hamada	Andy Richter
Naoko Yoshioka	Kumiko Okae	Kristine Sutherland
Hiromi	Hitomi Satō	Kristen Bell

== Production ==
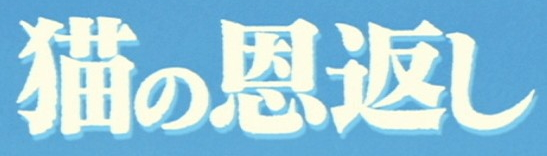
Japanese DVD title of the film The Cat Returns

In 1995, Studio Ghibli released a film titled Whisper of the Heart, based on a manga by Aoi Hiiragi about a girl writing a fantasy novel. Although the girl's life had no magical elements, the film featured short fantasy scenes depicting the girl writing the character of the Baron. The Cat Returns began as "The Cat Project" in 1999. Studio Ghibli received a request from a Japanese theme park to create a 20-minute short starring cats. Hayao Miyazaki wanted three key elements to feature in the short — these were the Baron, Muta (which appears in Whisper of the Heart as Moon), and a mysterious antique shop. Hiiragi was commissioned to create the manga equivalent of the short. The theme park later canceled the project. Miyazaki then took the existing work done by the "Cat Project" and used it as testing for future Studio Ghibli directors — the short was now to be 45 minutes long. Responsibility was given to Hiroyuki Morita, who had worked as an animator in the 1999 film My Neighbors the Yamadas. Over a nine-month period he translated Hiiragi's Baron story into 525 pages of storyboards for what was to be The Cat Returns. Miyazaki and Toshio Suzuki decided to produce a feature-length film based entirely on Morita's storyboard; this was partly because Haru, the main character, had a "believable feel to her". It became the second theatrical Studio Ghibli feature to be directed by someone other than Miyazaki or Isao Takahata. Telecom Animation Film, Production I.G, and DR Movie helped animate the film.

== Release ==
=== Box office ===
The film was released on July 20, 2002, as the highest-grossing domestic film at the Japanese box office and the 7th highest-grossing film of the year overall. The film earned a total of $65 million at the box office.

=== Critical reception ===
On the review aggregator website Rotten Tomatoes, 88% of 25 critics' reviews are positive, with an average rating of 6.9/10. The website's consensus reads: "Sweetly charming and beautifully animated, The Cat Returns offers anime adventure suitable for the very young and young at heart." According to Metacritic, which gave a score of 70 out of 100 based on 11 critics, the film received "generally favorable reviews".

Lisa Nesselson of Variety described the film as "catchy entertainment for kids and adults" and highlighted the "thrillingly imaginative" finale. Michael Booth of The Denver Post noted that director Morita "has a slightly cruder, more realistic sense of the world and its looniness than does Miyazaki, and you can see where The Cat Returns moves on a different track even as it pays homage to Japan's current animation master." Neil Smith of the BBC noted that while the film "can't quite match the invention of 2003 Oscar-winner Spirited Away...The Cat Returns is still an enchanting, magical fable with a twisted vein of surrealism."

=== Home media ===
The film was dubbed in English by Walt Disney Pictures with the voices of Anne Hathaway, Cary Elwes, Peter Boyle, Elliott Gould, Tim Curry, Judy Greer, and Kristen Bell, for a release on DVD on February 22, 2005, alongside Nausicaä of the Valley of the Wind and Porco Rosso. Walt Disney Studios Home Entertainment released the film on Blu-ray in the United States on June 16, 2015. GKIDS re-released the film on DVD and Blu-ray on January 16, 2018.

== Manga ==
- Baron the Cat
- Genre: Fantasy
- Manga
- Written by: Aoi Hiiragi
- Published by: Tokuma Shoten
- English publisher: Viz Media
- Magazine: Animage
- Published: March 27, 2002
- Volumes: 1

Baron the Cat (Note: Japanese: バロン 猫の男爵, Hepburn: Baron: Neko no Danshaku) is a 2002 manga written by Aoi Hiiragi and published by Tokuma Shoten. The story in the manga is largely the same as in its film adaptation, with a few minor differences, including a comedic ending in which the cat Natoru comes into Haru's room and pesters her. The manga also includes a mildly dark revelation involving Haru's cat friend from childhood, Yuki. In this version, Yuki was struck and killed by a vehicle. The Cat Kingdom is a sort of cat heaven, and Yuki helps Haru out of gratitude for feeding her fish crackers when she was a little girl. The film instead portrays the Cat Kingdom as a physically real dimension parallel to Haru's home city.

A few character-related differences can also be seen between the manga and the film. The visual design for Baron, as originally illustrated by Hiiragi in the manga, featured him as a dark gray cat with large blue eyes and long pointed ears, while in the Studio Ghibli version, Baron is orange-and-yellow with smaller green eyes and shorter ears. This design change was carried over from the way Baron was visually portrayed in the film adaptation Whisper of the Heart. Haru's hair was visually longer and darker in Hiiragi's illustrations, although the character Muta retained his general appearance from the manga in the film adaptation. Muta is a side protagonist in both Hiiragi's manga and the film adaptation, while in Whisper of the Heart, he is an antagonistic villain called "Moon". Hiiragi alluded to this in the manga, which was mildly referenced in the film; Muta in the film was said to have been a morbidly obese cat who ate every fish in the kingdom as rogue outlaw "Renaldo Moon", a fact he uses to frighten the Cat Kingdom into leaving Haru alone so she can escape.
