= Koro's Big Day Out =

2014 Japanese short film by Hayao Miyazaki

- Main title
- Directed by: Hayao Miyazaki
- Written by: Hayao Miyazaki
- Produced by: Tamami Yamamoto
- Starring: Itsuki Komazawa; Haruyo Moriyoshi; Kenji Imura
- Edited by: Megumi Uchida
- Music by: Yuji Nomi
- Production company: Studio Ghibli
- Distributed by: Ghibli Museum
- Release date: 2002 (Limited release in Ghibli Museum only)
- Running time: 14 minutes
- Country: Japan
- Language: Japanese

Koro's Big Day Out (Note: Japanese: コロの大さんぽ, Hepburn: Koro no Ōsanpo; lit. 'Koro's Big Walk') is a 2002 Japanese animated short film written and directed by Hayao Miyazaki. The film is about Koro the puppy, who runs away from his mistress, experiences some adventures around town and who is finally happily returned home. The film is exclusively shown at the Ghibli Museum and Ghibli Park, both in Japan.
