= Takeshi Seyama =

Japanese film editor from Tokyo (born 1944)

- Born: 1944 (age 81–82)
- Occupation: Film editor

Takeshi Seyama (瀬山 武司, Seyama Takeshi; born in 1944) is a Japanese film editor from Tokyo.

Seyama is the editor of many anime series and movies from Studio Ghibli, Katsuhiro Otomo, and Satoshi Kon, including hits such as Princess Mononoke, Steamboy, and Paprika. In 1992, Seyama founded the "Seyama Editing Room," which specializes in editing anime.

== Filmography ==
-As Editor

- Heidi, Girl of the Alps (1974) - 1 episode
- Princess Sarah (1985) - TV Series
- Sherlock Hound (1984-85) - 6 Episodes
- Castle in the Sky (1986)
- Lupin III: The Fuma Conspiracy (1987)
- My Neighbor Totoro (1988)
- Grave of the Fireflies (1988)
- Akira (1988)
- Venus Wars (1989)
- Little Nemo: Adventures in Slumberland (1989)
- Kiki's Delivery Service (1989)
- Only Yesterday (1991)
- Porco Rosso (1992)
- Ocean Waves (1993)
- Lupin III: Farewell to Nostradamus (1995)
- Whisper of the Heart (1995)
- Memories (1995)
- Princess Mononoke (1997)
- My Neighbors the Yamadas (1999)
- Spirited Away (2001)
- Princess Arete (2001)
- WXIII: Patlabor the Movie 3 (2002)
- Tokyo Godfathers (2003)
- Steamboy (2004)
- Howl's Moving Castle (2004)
- Tales from Earthsea (2006)
- Paprika (2006)
- Ponyo (2008)
- From Up on Poppy Hill (2011)
- The Wind Rises (2013)
- When Marnie Was There (2014)
- Okko's Inn (2018)
- The Boy and the Heron (2023)
