= The Little Prince and the Eight-Headed Dragon =

1963 Japanese animated film by Yūgo Serikawa

- Theatrical release poster
- Directed by: Yūgo Serikawa
- Screenplay by: Ichirō Ikeda; Takashi Iijima
- Starring: Morio Kazama; Yukiko Okada; Chiharu Kuri
- Cinematography: Mitsuaki Ishikawa; Hideaki Sugawara
- Edited by: Ikuzō Inaba
- Music by: Akira Ifukube
- Production company: Toei Animation
- Distributed by: Toei Company (Japan)
- Release date: March 24, 1963 (Japan)
- Running time: 86 minutes
- Country: Japan
- Language: Japanese

The Little Prince and the Eight-Headed Dragon (Japanese: わんぱく王子の大蛇退治, Hepburn: Wanpaku Ōji no Orochi Taiji; lit. 'The Naughty Prince's Slaying of Orochi') is a 1963 Japanese animated fantasy adventure film directed by Yūgo Serikawa and scripted by Ichirō Ikeda and Takashi Iijima. It is the sixth feature produced by Toei Animation (then Tōei Dōga), and was released in Japan on March 24, 1963.

Multiple notable individuals worked on the film, including supervising animator Yasuji Mori, animators Yasuo Ōtsuka and Yōichi Kotabe (who made his debut as a key animator on the film, though he is inaccurately credited on screen as an in between artist) and assistant directors Isao Takahata and Kimio Yabuki. The score was composed by Akira Ifukube. It features distinctively modernist, abstracted character, background and color design.

The film was well received and is considered one of the very best of the early Tōei Animation features, with praise for its music and visuals. It placed 10th in the list of the 150 best animated films and series of all time compiled by Tokyo's Laputa Animation Festival from an international survey of animation staff and critics in 2003.

== Plot ==
Susanoo and friends fighting Orochi

The film tells the story of the deity Susanoo (as a cute boy), whose mother, Izanami, has died. He is deeply hurt by the loss of his mother but his father, Izanagi, tells him that his mother is now in heaven. Despite Izanagi's warnings, Susanoo eventually sets off to find her.

Along with his companions, Akahana (a little talking rabbit) and Taitanbō (a strong but friendly giant from the Land of Fire), Susanoo overcomes all obstacles in his long voyage. He eventually comes to the Izumo Province, where he meets Princess Kushinada, a little girl whom he becomes friends with (he also thinks that she is so beautiful that she looks like his mother). Kushinada's family tells Susanoo that their other seven daughters were sacrificed to the fearsome eight-headed serpent, the Yamata no Orochi. Susanoo is so infatuated with Kushinada that he decides to help her family protect her and slay the Orochi once and for all and he, Akahana, and Bō prepare for the showdown.

== Cast ==
Character	Original	English
Susanoo	Morio Kazama	John Armstrong

- Yukiko Okada as Princess Kushinada
- Chiharu Kuri as Akahana
- Masato Yamanouchi as Wadatsumi, Kushinada-hime's father
- Kiyoshi Kawakubo as Titan-bô
- Hideo Kinoshita as Tarô / Tsukuyomi
- Kinshirô Iwao as Hi no kami (God of Fire)

== Production ==
This film eschewed the soft, rounded look of previous Toei animated features for a more stylized one. It is also one of the few animated films to have music by famed composer Akira Ifukube (the other being the posthumously released Tetsujin 28 film Hakuchū no Zangetsu).

== Soundtrack ==
A symphonic suite of five movements based on the score's cues was created by Ifukube in 2003, the first recording of which was performed by the Japan Philharmonic Orchestra conducted by Tetsuji Honna and released on Compact Disc by King Records within the same year. Some of the film's music was also reused in the 1st and 32nd episodes, first broadcast in 1972 and 1973 respectively, of the Toei Animation television series Mazinger Z.

The film's theme song, "Haha no Nai Ko no Komoriuta" (母のない子の子守歌; lit. "lullaby for a motherless child"), is also composed by Ifukube, with lyrics by Takashi Morishima, and is sung by Setsuko Watanabe.

The original, monaural soundtrack recording has been released three times on Compact Disc. The first was a two disc set released by Futureland in 1992, which paired it with a disc of alternate takes and Ifukube's score for Mitsubishi's Expo '70 exhibit. The second release was part of a ten-disc collection of Toei Animation soundtracks released by Nippon Columbia in 1996; it featured better audio quality but lacked the alternate takes. On May 23, 2018, Japanese record label Cinema-kan released the score for a third time as a remastered, two-disc set, titled The Naughty Prince's Orochi Slaying Original Soundtrack (CINK-51-52). The first disc contains the complete score while the second disc contains alternate takes, sound effects, and trailer music.

== Release ==
The film was distributed in the United States, under the title The Little Prince and the Eight-Headed Dragon, as a matinee feature by Columbia Pictures, opening January 1, 1964. Its Japanese origin was downplayed, as was standard practice at the time, with William Ross, the director of the English dubbing, credited as director and Fujifilm and Toei's color and widescreen processes rebranded as "MagiColor" and "WonderScope" respectively. The English-dubbed version was also released under several other titles, including Prince in Wonderland and Rainbow Bridge. The film's plot is based on the Shintō myth of the storm god Susanoo's battle with the Yamata no Orochi.

Though still highly regarded in animation circles, the film is now little-known outside of them. The film was released on DVD in Japan in 2002 and reissued in limited quantity in 2008. In 2019, a cropped transfer of the English-dubbed version was released in the United States by Mill Creek Entertainment (under licensed from Sony) as part of the "Pop Culture Bento Box" compilation set, though early copies of the set accidentally omitted the film. On February 5, 2020, Toei released the film on Blu-ray Disc in Japan.

== Reception ==
Accolades received by The Little Prince and the Eight-Headed Dragon at the time of its release including being honoured with a Bronze Osella at the Venice Film Festival and the Ōfuji Noburō Award at the 1963 Mainichi Film Awards and making it into the official recommendations of the Japanese Ministry of Education and the Ministry of Health's Central Child Welfare Council.

== Legacy ==
Genndy Tartakovsky credits the film as a primary influence on the direction and design of his TV series Samurai Jack.

Tomm Moore, the director of the Oscar-nominated films The Secret of Kells, Song of the Sea, and Wolfwalkers, has identified the film as a major influence.

== See also ==
- Japanese mythology
- List of animated feature films
- List of Japanese films of 1963
