= Yasuji Mori =

Japanese animator

- 森康二
- Born: January 28, 1925; Tottori, Tottori Prefecture, Japan
- Died: September 5, 1992 (aged 67)
- Occupation: Animator

Yasuji Mori (森康二, Mori Yasuji; January 28, 1925 – September 5, 1992) was an animator who worked with Toei Animation, while it was still known as Toei Doga. He was also a famous illustrator of children's books. Mori was responsible for one of the major animation styles within Toei Animation. In The Little Prince and the Eight-Headed Dragon Mori was the first to be credited as animation director in Japan, although Akira Daikubara had the same post on The Tale of the White Serpent but was not credited as that. As a senior animator he formed many of the great animators of the next generation (including Hayao Miyazaki, Isao Takahata, Yasuo Ōtsuka, and Yoichi Kotabe). He later left Toei Animation to work with Nippon Animation.

== Filmography ==
- Key animator on The Tale of the White Serpent (1958)
- Animation director on The Little Prince and the Eight-Headed Dragon (1963)
- Key animator on Hols: Prince of the Sun (1968)
- Animation director on Puss in Boots (1969)
- Animation director on Rocky Chuck the Woodchuck (1973)
- Character designer on Dog of Flanders (TV series) (1975)
- Character designer on Laura, the Prairie Girl (1975)
- Key animator on Future Boy Conan (1978)
- Layout supervisor, Noozles (1984)
