= Only Yesterday (1991 film) =

1991 Japanese animated film

- Theatrical release poster

Japanese name
- Kanji: おもひでぽろぽろ
Transcriptions
- Revised Hepburn: Omoide Poro Poro
- Directed by: Isao Takahata
- Screenplay by: Isao Takahata
- Based on: Omoide Poro Poro by Hotaru Okamoto; Yuko Tone
- Produced by: Toshio Suzuki
- Starring: Miki Imai; Toshirō Yanagiba; Yōko Honna
- Cinematography: Hisao Shirai
- Edited by: Takeshi Seyama
- Music by: Katz Hoshi
- Production company: Studio Ghibli
- Distributed by: Toho
- Release date: July 20, 1991
- Running time: 118 minutes
- Country: Japan
- Language: Japanese
- Box office: ¥3.18 billion (Japan) $453,243 (overseas)

Only Yesterday (Japanese: おもひでぽろぽろ, Hepburn: Omohide Poro Poro (Note: The film title uses the historical spelling おもひで omohide, instead of the modern spelling おもいで. For either spelling, the word is pronounced omoide, with the "h" sound omitted.); lit. 'Memories Come Tumbling Down') is a 1991 Japanese animated drama film written and directed by Isao Takahata, based on the 1982 manga Omoide Poro Poro by Hotaru Okamoto and Yuko Tone. Produced by Toshio Suzuki, it was animated by Studio Ghibli for Tokuma Shoten, Nippon Television Network and Hakuhodo, and distributed by Toho. The film follows a twenty-seven-year-old Taeko Okajima as she takes a holiday with her relatives in the country; during the course of her trip, she reminisces about her life when she was ten. The ending theme song "Ai wa Hana, Kimi wa sono Tane" (愛は花、君はその種子; "Love is a flower, you are the seed") is a Japanese translation of Amanda McBroom's composition "The Rose".

The film was released on July 20, 1991. A surprise box office success, it attracted a large adult audience and became the highest-grossing Japanese film of 1991 in the country. It has also been well received by critics outside of Japan—maintaining a 100% rating on Rotten Tomatoes. To celebrate the film's 25th anniversary, GKIDS released the film for the first time in an English-language format on February 26, 2016, featuring the voices of Daisy Ridley, Dev Patel, Alison Fernandez, Laura Bailey and Ashley Eckstein. A stage musical based on the film toured Japan in 2011, and a 2021 live-action sequel follows a 64-year-old Taeko with her daughter and granddaughter.

== Plot ==
In 1982, Taeko Okajima lives in Tokyo as an unmarried office worker, and enjoys visiting the rural countryside. She decides to take another trip to visit her eldest sister Nanako's in-laws to help with the safflower harvest. While traveling at night on a sleeper train to Yamagata, she begins to recall memories of herself as a ten-year-old schoolgirl in 1966, and her intense desire to go on holiday like her classmates, all of whom have family outside of the big city. This precipitates a series of memories from the same school year, including her first crush, the first time she and her family ate a pineapple (which was hard, as it was unripe), and how she learned about and indirectly dealt with puberty.

When Taeko arrives, she is surprised to find that her brother-in-law's second cousin Toshio, whom she barely knows, is the one who came to pick her up. Toshio himself moved back from the city to become a farmer and help his family, but became passionate about farming and decided to stay. Taeko continues to reflect on the memories of her ten-year-old self, and tells her family about them. When she sees her young cousin Naoko unsuccessfully ask her mother for Puma sneakers, Taeko tells her about how she once similarly wanted a purse. Her elder sister Yaeko was asked to give her an old one; in the ensuing argument, a sulking Taeko became indecisive about whether to join her family to go out for food. In a moment of panic she ran out of the house after her family, but was slapped by her father for walking outside without shoes (an indicator of poverty in postwar Japan). Taeko reflects that she was partially in the wrong herself for begging for more things, convincing Naoko to move on.

Later, when having lunch with Toshio, Taeko recalls about how she always struggled with the concept of fractions in school, and asks him if he ever similarly struggled with something. Toshio mentions his compulsion as a farmer has troubled him due to the industry dying out, and muses how the entire rural landscape was built by farmers in spite of this. Seeing how they all connect with each other, Taeko realizes that the rural country is making her nostalgic, and that her memories are weaving a tapestry for her present self to reminisce on. With this, she recalls to Toshio and Naoko about how she once discovered a talent for acting and was nearly cast in a university play, only for her father to shut the idea down, making the rest of the family crestfallen; by high school Taeko moved on, discovering that drama was not her passion.

On the eve of Taeko's departure, Toshio's grandmother, sensing that Taeko wishes to stay, suddenly suggests that Taeko stay in the country and marry Toshio, flustering her. As she runs out of the house to be alone, she recalls her brief encounter with an ill-mannered, working class boy. Forced to sit next to him at school, she was the only one who treated him with kindness and dignity, even though she hated being around him and her friends disparaged him. When he moved schools, however, she was the only person he refused to shake hands with. Toshio soon finds Taeko in the rain, and she tells him about this boy as he drives her back. Toshio bluntly suggests that he may have liked her, while also implying his own feelings for her. Realizing how easy it is to talk with Toshio, Taeko starts to realize her own feelings for him.

Taeko leaves the next day, promising to visit again in the winter. As she sits on the train, however, she is approached by the memories of all her classmates including her past self, who wordlessly convince her that what she really wants is to stay. She gets off the train and meets with Toshio, who drives her back as her past self looks on.

== Cast and characters ==
Character	Japanese voice actor	English dubbing actor
Main cast
Taeko Okajima (age 10) (岡島タエ子, Okajima Taeko)	Yōko Honna	Alison Fernandez
Taeko Okajima (age 27)	Miki Imai	Daisy Ridley
Toshio (トシオ)	Toshirō Yanagiba	Dev Patel
Young Taeko's classmates
Tsuneko Tani (谷ツネ子, Tani Tsuneko)	Mayumi Iizuka	Hope Levy
Aiko (アイ子)	Mei Oshitani	Stephanie Sheh
Toko (トコ)	Megumi Komine	Ava Acres
Rie (リエ)	Yukiyo Takizawa	Madeleine Rose Yen
Suu (スー)	Masashi Ishikawa	Jaden Betts
Shuuji Hirota (広田秀二, Hirota Shūji)	Yūki Masuda	Gianella Thielmann
Taeko's family in Tokyo
Taeko's Mother (タエ子の母, Taeko no haha)	Michie Terada	Grey DeLisle
Taeko's Father (タエ子の父, Taeko no chichi)	Masahiro Itō	Matthew Yang King
Nanako Okajima (岡島ナナ子, Okajima Nanako)	Yorie Yamashita	Laura Bailey
Yaeko Okajima (岡島ヤエ子, Okajima Yaeko)	Yuki Minowa	Ashley Eckstein
Taeko's Grandmother (タエ子の祖母, Taeko no baba)	Chie Kitagawa	Mona Marshall
Taeko's farm relatives in Yamagata
Kazuo (カズオ)	Kōji Gotō	Matthew Yang King
Kiyoko (キヨ子)	Sachiko Ishikawa	Sumalee Montano
Naoko (ナオ子)	Masako Watanabe	Tara Strong
Granny (ばっちゃ, Baccha)	Shin Itō	Nika Futterman

== Production ==
The film is based on a manga by the same name written by Hotaru Okamoto and drawn by Yuko Tone. Animated by Studio Ghibli, the film's producer Hayao Miyazaki was intrigued by the original Only Yesterday manga, believing there was potential value in depicting the type of children's story it told. However, he felt he was not up to the task of adapting it into a film, but the idea remained in his mind as he directed other children's films such as My Neighbor Totoro, and he eventually brought the idea to Takahata. Only those scenes set in 1966 with the 10-year-old Taeko are from the source material. Takahata had difficulty adapting the episodic manga into a feature film, and he, therefore, invented the framing narrative wherein the adult Taeko journeys to the countryside and falls in love with Toshio.

During production, Miyazaki and Takahata's relationship was at times fraught. Artists were sometimes subject to bursts of anger, and although they later made up, Miyazaki would constantly complain that Takahata was unable to meet production deadlines. Due to Takahata's laxity in meeting scheduled deadlines, spring screenings planned in advance of the summer release had to be cancelled. The film's animation director was Yoshifumi Kondo. The need for more people to work on the film caused Studio Ghibli to place advertisements in Animage. In Japan's animated film industry at the time, common practice was to pay workers per drawing or painting they did, this often led to animators earning at a lower rate than the average in society. During production of Only Yesterday Miyazaki proposed changes to the staffing of Studio Ghibli. Beginning in November 1990 full-time employment (including fixed salaries), regular recruitment, and in-house animation training programmes were initiated, doubling production costs. This required a constant stream of production, leading Miyazaki to begin working on Porco Rosso by himself before work could be finished on Only Yesterday. It was around this time that he proposed building a new studio in Koganei, Tokyo.

The story takes place within the Takase district of Yamagata City, Yamagata Prefecture. The Takase Station (and also Yamadera Station) of the JNR (currently JR East) Senzan Line is featured prominently; though it has since been rebuilt, the scenery remains mostly unchanged. During the course of the film, characters visit prominent locales, including the resort destination of Mount Zaō. In order to create an accurate picture of Yamagata, 450 colours were used in the realisation of its scenery, with the colour department taking around a year to find the correct shade of red that accurately captured the flowers during summer. Taeko recalls her childhood favorite puppet show Hyokkori Hyotan Jima (lit. 'Floating Gourd Island') which was an actual puppet show that aired every weekday on NHK from 1964 to 1969. The puppet from the show seen in the film was based on a creation by Mitsuo Iso made from thick cloth, styrofoam, pencils, and sellotape.

Unlike the typical Japanese character animation style, the characters have more realistic facial muscles and expressions due to much of the dialogue being recorded first (the tradition in Japan is to record it after the animation is completed) and the animators fit the animation to the spoken dialogue. Takahata also had voice actors record some of their lines together, using footage of their performances as a guide for both design and the animation. Some changes had to be made to the film, requiring re-recording of certain parts. Only Yesterday was the first film that Toshio's voice actor Yanagiba had dubbed, he described his reaction to the unity of voice and animation as finding it "very strange". Assistant director Norihiko Sudo used an 8 mm camera and quick action recorder to study realistic movements, these images were then printed in order to deconstruct unnatural movements that were standardised in animation at the time. However, the scenes of Taeko's childhood past were animated before the voices were recorded, subtly contrasting the anime style of her childhood and the adult "reality" of the framing story. Voice actress Miki Imai was the model for the adult Taeko.

== Themes ==
=== Memory and nostalgia ===
The holiday Taeko takes to the countryside is a journey of remembrance that recalls her childhood, re-discovering how her mundane feelings and memories mix with her present self, drawing on a tradition of live-action family movies in classic Japanese cinema. To Susan Napier Only Yesterday is a celebration of "youth, innocence, and nostalgia for a disappearing past", which she categorises as exemplifying the 'elegiac' genre mode in anime. Colin Odell and Michelle Le Blanc write that the transition from the city to the country reflects Taeko's nostalgia and different visions of growing up in a changing Japan, this is achieved through both a metaphysical and literal trip, symbolised by Taeko's train journeys. They contrast the stylised 1980s sequences with the flashback sequences' "less authentic 'realism,'" or what Idris Kellermann Williams terms as "minimalism." As part of this aesthetic separation, the frame of the flashback sequences uses a softer colour palette with faded edges, while the 1980s scenes use precise lines in animating characters and environments. Kellermann Williams argues this aesthetic separation "encourages distanced and reflective reexamination of memories," while also demonstrating the "subjective nature and limited viewpoint" of memories themselves. The film's "conservative" structure embodies a perspective Napier refers to as "quintessentially 'Japanese'", reflecting a domestic positioning in a Japan whose international role was changing.

Nostalgic elements from the 1960s, such as the fashion and music interspersed throughout the film, are rendered wistful by Taeko's struggle to come to terms with her past self. Leaving Taeko's dreams unfulfilled, the film's conclusion is left ambiguous, referring to its nostalgia as part of the adult Taeko's personal development. Part of this nostalgia is felt through the comparison between the city and the countryside, continued urban expansion is set against a desire to live in a traditional manner. Taeko briefly takes off her gloves when handling the safflower to empathise with past generations of farmers who worked for the aesthetic luxury of women in Kyoto. Toshio places this in the wider context of the present agricultural industry. The contrast between Taeko's personal memories and the collective history of the countryside presents two forms of nostalgia, with Taeko's year of "emotional and sexual growth" being a means by which her past self can be integrated into her renewed self.

=== Environment ===
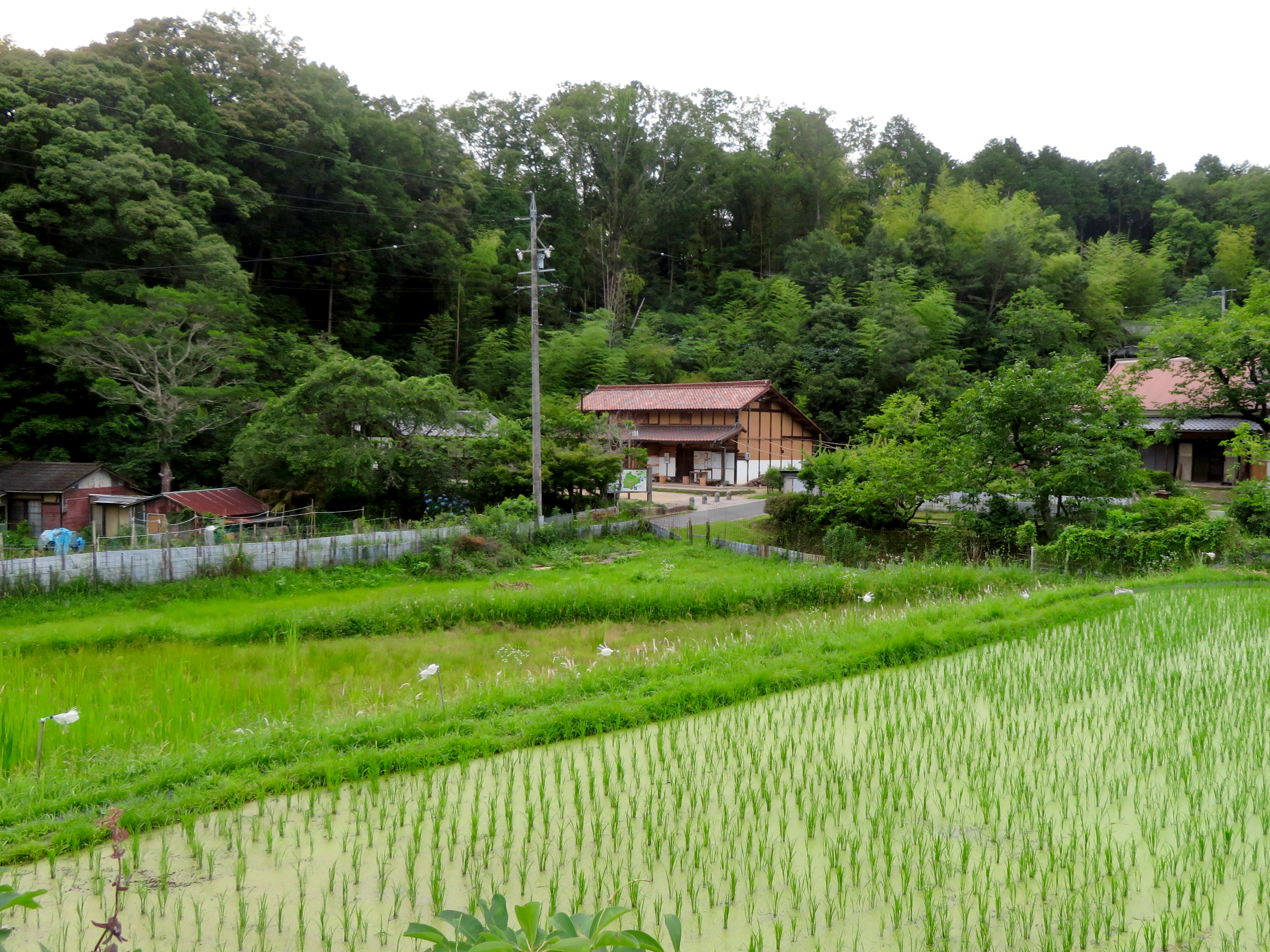
Example picture of a satoyama, in Aichi Prefecture

Only Yesterday gives a positive experience of country life through Taeko's eyes. By allowing her to fulfil her childlike dream of living in the countryside, it explores the sentiment of her confined memories. To Napier, the rural Other, located next to the urban centres of postmodernity represents a successful escape to the challenges of modern life. This theme reflects Japanese state-sponsored programmes that, beginning in the mid-1980s, have encouraged people to move to the country. To Odell and Le Blanc, the opposition between Taeko's urban and rural environments leads to a debate concerning the gap in social community between the city and the country. By the end of the film Taeko leaves behind her isolated life as a spinster in an overpopulated city to integrate into a new community environment. They compare this form of community living to that shown in Takahata's earlier film Horus, Prince of the Sun (1968), noting that in Only Yesterday "socialism is a notable but subtle subtext".

Roger Hecht in his analysis of the film utilises the concept of climate (風土, fūdo) from the philosophy of Watsuji Tetsuro to explain the metaphysical relationship people form with nature. This relationship being threatened by the alienation of local people from the traditions and environment of the countryside, as well as the direction of Japan's booming economy. In this analysis he presents Taeko's first day arriving in the countryside as a reconnection between people, work, and spirituality, highlighting how she follows her in-laws in stopping to pray during her work as the sun rises. The satoyama as a working landscape therein represents a coexistence between humans and nature, despite representing "a disappearing model of sustainable stewardship." He concludes his analysis by reflecting on the family's judgements that Taeko has internalised in her childhood memories, explaining her experience of fūdo and blooming romance with Toshio as a form of psychological recovery.

== Release ==
=== Theatrical ===
The film released in Japan on July 20, 1991, by Toho in theaters. Despite the movie's success in the Japanese box office, Only Yesterday was not released to other Western countries for over a decade. The film had an advertisement tie-in with the tomato sauce brand, Kagome. Children's lunch sets were made and launched upon the film's release. The film was released theatrically in Brazil on July 10, 1993.

In 2015, GKIDS announced it would release the film in theaters in North America in 2016 along with an English dub, with actors Daisy Ridley, Dev Patel, Ashley Eckstein and Alison Fernandez confirmed to lend their voices. The film premiered in New York City on January 1, 2016, with a wider North American release on February 26, 2016.

=== Home video ===
Germany was the first released the film on June 6, 2006, dubbed in the German language. Australia and the United Kingdom would follow suit in 2006 and distribute the film in their region under Madman Entertainment and Optimum Releasing respectively. In France, Belgium, and Switzerland, a DVD was released on October 31, 2007, without a French dub. In North America, the film held the longest distinction of being the only theatrical Studio Ghibli feature not yet released on home video. Walt Disney Studios, which had then owned the North American distribution rights to Studio Ghibli's catalog, refused to release it because of its candid treatment of menstruation in the flashback sequences. In celebration of its 25th anniversary, Only Yesterday was later released on Blu-Ray and DVD on July 5, 2016, by GKIDS and Universal Pictures Home Entertainment, earning $1,780,357 in sales revenue. A subtitled version of the film was aired on Turner Classic Movies in January 2006, as part of the channel's month-long salute to Miyazaki and Ghibli.

== Music ==
Takahata commissioned an image album from Katsu Hoshi (credited as Katz), releasing in December 1990, preceding the release of the film by nearly seven months. Hoshi and Takahata repurposed some of these songs for the film's soundtrack, while also including snippets from popular Japanese rock bands (e.g. The Wild Ones), motifs from Schubert and Brahms, and international folk music. Takahata even wrote his own translation of the pop song "The Rose", performed by enka singer Harumi Miyako. Takahata planned 'three pillars of music' for the film, the first pillar was diegetic and non-diegetic snippets of music highlighting specific moments of Taeko's flashbacks; the second pillar was Eastern European folk music such as the Bulgarian Women's Chorus and "Frunzuliță Lemn Adus Cântec De Nuntă" (Fluttering Green Leaves Wedding Song), a Romanian folk song written by Gheorghe Zamfir, using a nai played by Zamfir himself, cimbalom and violins; the third pillar was a series of introspective compositions for the piano and a small string ensemble designed to be played over scenes of Taeko's self-examination of her past. These 'three pillars' were used by Takahata to help conceptualise the film's structure of 'quotation'.

The repeated Eastern European theme in the film, particularly in the soundtrack reflecting the peasant lifestyle still present in the area draws parallels with Japanese rural life. For instance, Hungarian music in the film such as the use of Brahms' "Hungarian Dance No. 5" in a scene where Taeko is eating lunch, and making references to Hungarian musicians when she is in the car with Toshio ("Teremtés" performed by Sebestyén Márta & Muzsikás. Adaptation from a Hungarian traditional folk song). The music of Márta Sebestyén with Muzsikás is used in several scenes as well. Bulgarian folk music is also used in the soundtrack. When Taeko is on the field, one can first hear "Dilmano, Dilbero", followed by "Malka Moma Dvori Mete". These are typical Bulgarian folk songs and the lyrics of both are connected to topics mentioned in the film – the life of farmers and marriage.

Kunio Hara argues that Takahata's use of music in the film "invites his audience to reflect on the creative potential of memory and the passage of time itself."

== Reception ==
=== Box office ===
Only Yesterday was the highest-grossing Japanese film on the domestic market in 1991, grossing ¥3.18 billion at the Japanese box office. Its release in all territories internationally has accrued a box-office total of $608,562. The initial 2008 Russian release on May 8 opened at $9,041 across three cinemas, finishing 20th at the weekend box office. In total its run generated $19,867. The 2016 English-language release later earned $525,958, including $453,243 in the United States. In the United Kingdom box office returns came to $5,044 across twelve cinemas after release on June 3, whereas in Finland ten cinemas generated $8,141 in box office returns from December 9. In Oceania, both territories of Australia and New Zealand had the film open earlier on May 5, with receipts totalling $33,195 in the former, and $7,695 in the latter. A later 2023 release in Australia accrued $408 total. In Italy the film accrued a total of $62,329 in a July 4, 2024, re-release across 169 cinemas.

=== Critical reception ===
On Rotten Tomatoes, the film has a rating of 100% based reviews from 63 critics. The site's critical consensus states "Only Yesterday's long-delayed U.S. debut fills a frustrating gap for American Ghibli fans while offering further proof of the studio's incredibly consistent commitment to quality." On Metacritic the film has a weighted average score of 90 out of 100 based on 19 critics, indicating "universal acclaim".

Roger Ebert gave the film a very favorable review in his essay regarding anime and the other work of Studio Ghibli calling it "a touching, melancholy meditation on the life of the same woman at ages 10 and 27." Nicolas Rapold, of The New York Times, gave the film a positive review, saying, "Mr. Takahata's psychologically acute film, which was based on a manga, seems to grow in impact, too, as the adult Taeko comes to a richer understanding of what she wants and how she wants to live." Glenn Kenny of RogerEbert.com awarded it a similarly positive review, saying "Like Kaguya, it functions as a highly sensitive and empathetic consideration of the situation of women in Japanese society—but it's also a breathtaking work of art on its own."

=== Accolades ===
	Award	Category	Result	Recipient	Ref.
1991	15th Japan Academy Prize	Popularity Award	Won	Only Yesterday	
1992	9th Annual Golden Gross Award	Excellence Award	Won	Only Yesterday	

== Media ==
=== Manga ===
Written by Hotaru Okamoto and drawn by Yuko Tone, the original josei manga was published in 1982, with the first volume released in 1990. Set in the 1960s, the manga only depicts the life of Taeko as a fifth-grader. The film's direct adaptations from the original manga are faithful.

=== Live-action special ===
A live-action special serving as a continutation of the film debuted in Japan in 2021. Set in 2020, it follows Taeko (who is now a grandmother) as she lives with her daughter and granddaughter in 2020 Tokyo. Directed by Kazutaka Watanabe and written by Koichi Yajima, it stars Keiko Matsuzaka as Taeko, and Anne Watanabe as her daughter Natsuki. Shooting took place around September 2020.

=== Stage adaptation ===
A musical adaptation of the film was announced in 2010, debuting in 2011. After opening at the Galaxy Theatre in Shinagawa ward on April 16, it played in Akita before touring the whole country in 2012. The play starred Asami Hikaru (who played Taeko) and Mori Keaki of the Takarazuka theatre group, and Mieno Aoi of the Warabiza theatre company. The director was Kuriyama Tamiya. Tickets went on sale on December 4, 2010.

== See also ==
- Whisper of the Heart and From Up on Poppy Hill, 1995 and 2011 Japanese animated drama films with similar stories, also from Studio Ghibli.
- Ocean Waves, a 1993 Japanese animated TV film, also from Studio Ghibli.
- Japan, Our Homeland
- Mai Mai Miracle
