= Panda! Go, Panda! =

1972 Japanese animated film

- Cover of Japanese DVD

パンダ・コパンダ (Panda Kopanda)
- Genre: Comedy; Animation
- Anime film
- Directed by: Isao Takahata
- Written by: Hayao Miyazaki
- Music by: Masahiko Satō
- Studio: Tokyo Movie; A Production
- Licensed by: AUS: Madman Entertainment; NA: GKIDS; UK: Manga Entertainment
- Released: December 17, 1972
- Runtime: 33 minutes
- Anime film

The Rainy-Day Circus
- Directed by: Isao Takahata
- Produced by: Shunzo Kato
- Written by: Hayao Miyazaki
- Music by: Masahiko Satō
- Studio: Tokyo Movie; A Production
- Licensed by: AUS: Madman Entertainment; NA: GKIDS; UK: Manga Entertainment
- Released: March 17, 1973
- Runtime: 38 minutes

Panda Kopanda (パンダ・コパンダ; lit. 'Panda, Baby Panda') is a Japanese animated short film, first released in 1972. It was created by the team of Isao Takahata (director), Hayao Miyazaki (writer, layout, scene design), Yoichi Kotabe (animation director) and Yasuo Otsuka (animation director, character design). This short film was released in Japan at the height of the panda craze, initiated in September 1972, when the government announced the loan of a pair of giant pandas from China to the Ueno Zoo as part of panda diplomacy.

A success in Japanese theaters, its creators followed up with Panda! Go, Panda!: The Rainy-Day Circus in 1973, which was also a success. In 1974, Takahata, Miyazaki and Kotabe would create the landmark anime series Heidi, Girl of the Alps. In 1985, Takahata and Miyazaki would found Studio Ghibli.

Panda Kopanda is known in North America by the title, Panda! Go, Panda! The two short films are available on DVD and Blu-ray in Japan, and on DVD in North America.

== Story ==
The plot follows Mimiko (ミミ子), a bright little girl left alone when her grandmother leaves on a trip to her grandfather's memorial service in Nagasaki. Making a few stops at some local stores, Mimiko comes home to her house in a bamboo grove and finds a panda cub named Panny (Pan-Chan) sleeping on the back doorstep. She quickly makes friends with the panda, and invites him in for a drink. His father, PapaPanda, soon comes to visit, and they decide to become a family after PapaPanda offers to be Mimiko's father (Mimiko never had any parents). Mimiko also chooses to be the mother to Panny (Pan-Chan), making the concept of a family strange. The three adjust to life together during their first night together, while Mimiko writes the first of many letters to her grandma (who she promised to write to every day).

The next day, Mimiko goes to school, reluctantly allowing Panny to tag along (even though she told him to stay home). In a close call, Panny ends up getting all of Mimiko's school (save for Mimiko) chasing after him. The next day, Mimiko gets an unexpected visit from a local policeman, who came to check on her. Expectedly, he freaks out after seeing PapaPanda. He goes to notify the local zoo staff, who invite the zookeeper (who lost PapaPanda and Panny after they broke out of the zoo). The zookeeper demands the safe return of his pandas, so he joins the police and zoo staff in the search.

Meanwhile, Mimiko and her family go out on a walk and, after scaring off some local bullies, they inadvertently lose Panny after he rolls down a hill. Mimiko and PapaPanda go searching for him, eventually gaining help from local police and the zookeeper in the search. They find Panny floating on a piece of wood, heading towards an open floodgate and hurry to save him. The handle, however, has rusted, leaving Panny in a dangerous situation. Mimiko comes close to falling into dangerous waters after she jumps down to save Panny from death, but PapaPanda saves both of them by closing the floodgate. Mimiko, alongside Panny, PapaPanda, the zookeeper and the local police, cheer their success. PapaPanda, alongside Panny, return to work at the zoo, under the condition that they can leave after the visitors have left to spend time with Mimiko.

=== Panda! Go, Panda!: The Rainy-Day Circus ===
The adventures are continued in another short film from the same staff, Panda! Go, Panda!: The Rainy-Day Circus (パンダ・コパンダ 雨降りサーカスの巻, Panda Kopanda: Amefuri Sākasu no Maki). In this episode, Mimiko and the pandas meet a ringmaster and one of his cronies, who were searching for something in their home. Mimiko is overjoyed, thinking that they are burglars, but they are quickly scared off by the family, and run away in fear. The family soon sit down to eat, but Panny finds his food has been eaten. In a way similar to the story of Goldilocks and the Three Bears, Panny finds what the ringmaster was looking for: a tiger cub named Tiny (Tora-chan).

After getting spooked by Tiny, Panny (along with the entire household) befriends the tiger. The next day, Mimiko goes to ask around town, to see if anyone knows where Tiny is from, only to lose both Panny and Tiny when Tiny goes to see his real mother. Mimiko is invited to the local circus, which is exactly the same one owned by the ringmaster that had tried to break in the night before, by a few of her friends. She gladly accepts the offer.

At the circus, Tiny shows Panny his balancing act. Panny tries to emulate the act, but ends up getting chased by the local circus performers and the ringmaster. To make matters worse, Panny crashes straight into the tiger cage, where Tiny's unhappy mother waits. Mimiko slips into the circus after someone yells that Panny is in trouble and runs into Tiny's mother. They swap the cubs (respectively, Panny to Mimiko and Tiny to his mother) and become quick friends. The ringmaster gives Mimiko and her family tickets to the show, but on the way home, a nasty storm breaks out. Overnight, it floods most of the land around Mimiko's hometown.

A frantic cry of help from Tiny (in the form of a makeshift bottled message) sends Mimiko and her family in a search for him. They learn from the ringmaster that the circus train is carrying all the animals, and it is stuck in the middle of nowhere. Mimiko and her family go to free the animals, which they succeed in doing, but unintentionally cause the train to start (due to the playful antics of Panny and Tiny). The train goes off the rails, and ends up in a collision course with the mayor's house, but PapaPanda stops the train, and Mimiko and her family become heroes. The film concludes with Mimiko and her panda family enjoying a day at the circus and later marching at home in a line while blowing brass horns (PapaPanda plays a tuba, Mimiko plays a French horn and Panny plays a trumpet that was broken earlier and somehow fixed later on).

== Production ==
In 1971, Takahata, Miyazaki and Kotabe left the Toei Animation studio to join their fellow animator and mentor Otsuka at the A Productions studio, in hopes of creating an animated series based on Astrid Lindgren's Pippi Longstocking. After extensive pre-production work, the trio travelled to Sweden to seek permission from Lindgren; their request was flatly refused.

Rejected, Takahata and Miyazaki joined Otsuka on the Lupin III Part I TV series as the "A-Pro directors team". After Lupin's cancellation in 1972, the team revisited the Pippi Longstocking project, and reworked many of its ideas and story elements into Panda Kopanda. The film, as well as its followup, Rainy Day Circus, played as the opening short to Toho's Godzilla films, where it was warmly received by audiences.

Animator Yoshifumi Kondo, who also worked on Lupin III, served as a key animator on the two panda films, most notably a scene in Rainy Day Circus where Mimiko and the pandas ride a bed across a flooded river. Kondo would play a valuable role in many later Takahata and Miyazaki films, including Anne of Green Gables, Grave of the Fireflies, and Whisper of the Heart.

== Home video ==
In North America, Panda Kopanda was available on DVD, under the title, "Panda! Go Panda!", courtesy of Pioneer Entertainment, later Discotek Media. The latter company released both films on Blu-ray in 2016 and was re-released in 2022 by its current licensee, GKIDS. In Japan, the film is available as a standalone DVD and Blu-ray on Studio Ghibli's Ghibli Ga Ippai label, and included in the 2015 Blu-ray box set, The Collected Works of Director Isao Takahata. English subtitles are included in the Japanese releases.
