= List of 3000 Leagues in Search of Mother episodes =

This is a list of all 52 episodes of 3000 Leagues in Search of Mother, an anime television series produced by Nippon Animation. The series aired in Japan between January 4 and December 26, 1976.

== Episodes ==
No.	Title	Original release date
1	"Don't Go, Mother"; Transliteration: "Ikenai de Okā-chan" (Japanese: いかないでおかあさん)	January 4, 1976
In Italy during a period of depression in 1881, Marco, with his older brother Tonio and both of the parents, Pietro and Anna, has gone to the hills in Genoa to have a picnic. Little does he know that his mom will be leaving them for Argentina to work as a maid that will solve the insolvency trouble of their family. He was supposed to learn about it later, but he overheard his mom talking about it before then and just couldn't muster the spirit to accept it, as he was against this, but they made this decision because Marco refused to understand. Later at the docks, when she does go on the ship, Marco does break out of his grudge and tearfully bids goodbye to his mom, who wouldn't be available to cajole him for a few years.
2	"Marco, Genovese Boy"; Transliteration: "Jenoba no shōnen Maruko" (Japanese: ジェノバの少年マルコ)	January 11, 1976
It has been one year since Marco's mother has gone to Argentina. Marco spends his days attending school, helping his neighbours in his tight-knit community, and waiting for Mamma's letter.
3	"Sunday in the Port Town"; Transliteration: "Nichiyōbi no minatochō" (Japanese: 日曜日の港町)	January 18, 1976
It's Sunday, and after attending the Sunday church service, Marco, tonio and his father were going to go to the beach. But duty calls from Aunt Gina, and he then goes all around Genoa City to deliver letters diligently. After which he still has time to spend with family at the beach. But there, he also still thinks about his mamma.
4	"I Hate You, Dad"; Transliteration: "Otō-san nanka dai kirai" (Japanese: おとうさんなんか大きらい)	January 25, 1976
After defending his little friend Bernardo from 3 bullies, Marco has a quarrel with his dad over his dad prioritising Marco's education and Marco favouring getting a job so his mum can come home. After leaving the house in anger, he finds the Peppino troupe, a family of circus performers who have made it their mission to go to Argentina, which Marco finds intriguing.
5	"Buddy Emilio"; Transliteration: "Nakayoshi Emirio" (Japanese: なかよしエミリオ)	February 1, 1976
Through his friend Emilio, Marco gets a job cleaning bottles, unbeknownst to his dad. But all this stress does make his young body collapse from exhaustion, and he keeps showing devotion to the job.
6	"Marco's Payday"; Transliteration: "Maruko no gekkyūbi" (Japanese: マルコの月給日)	February 8, 1976
Marco finally gets a good pay, including cleaning bottles, which incidentally is a good thing as her mum has stalled on her monthly payment and his dad's clinic business isn't doing so well. His dad then decides to move out somewhere cheaper, much to the chagrin of Marco.
7	"Small Ocean on the Roof"; Transliteration: "Yane no ue no chiisana umi" (Japanese: 屋根の上の小さな海)	February 15, 1976
After Marco angrily moves to that dreary, dirty new place, he finds the new neighbours are those from the peppino troupe family. Marco befriends a girl from that family, called Fiolina.
8	"Merry Peppino's Band"; Transliteration: "Yukaina Peppiino ichiza" (Japanese: ゆかいなペッピーノ一座)	February 22, 1976
In Italy's dire economic situation people are actually going to Argentina to find work. Marco finds out that the peppino troupe also would like to go there. So, if amedio can go with them then marco thinks he can use this chance to travel to argentina and find out the condition of his mother there. Upon telling this to his father, they have a big quarrel and he goes to his bedroom angrily.
9	"Sorry, Dad"; Transliteration: "Gomennasai otō-san" (Japanese: ごめんなさいおとうさん)	February 29, 1976
It was a hectic day for marco. First he gets unemployed as the machanized labour in bottle cleaning has rendered his manual labour. Then he finds his friend emilio is still working with a sprained ankle. Afterwards, he finds out that the peppino guy can't really hope to go as his eldest has fallen ill. Lastly, marco, after escorting a friend of his father to his clinic witnesses a phenomenal thing. First blood transfusion in genovese history. After seeing his father's determination in it, him and his father make up and marco profusely apologizes.
10	"Mother's Buenos Aires"; Transliteration: "kā-chan no Buenosuairesu" (Japanese: かあさんのブエノスアイレス)	March 7, 1976
Marco helps the concetta girl and mr. peppino from the troupe to get necessary medical attention by bringing a doctor to them.
11	"Mother's Letter"; Transliteration: "kā-chan no tegami" (Japanese: おかあさんの手紙)	March 14, 1976
Marco helps the fiolina girl from the peppino family to earn for her family with her puppet show, instead of both her big sister and father who were both ill. Coming home, marco finally finds a letter from mum updating about her financial and job situation. Marco finds her situation and thinks he must get to her.
12	"Day of the Flight of the Hot-Air Balloon"; Transliteration: "Hikō fune no tobu hi" (Japanese: ひこう船のとぶ日)	March 21, 1976
Emilio and marco were able to earn a moderate amount of money at the airshow parade near the dock. But it still wasn't enough for the ticket fee to argentina. So, they have to get help from a shady named renato.
13	"Goodbye, Fiolina"; Transliteration: "Sayonara Fioriina" (Japanese: さよならフィオリーナ)	March 26, 1976
Renato has snatched Marco's money. So Emilio & he take they are owed by force. But the acquired money isn’t enough. So, Marco, while at the docks, gives a letter addressed to his mum to Fiolina's family.
14	"Marco's Decision"; Transliteration: "Maruko no ketsui" (Japanese: マルコの決意)	April 4, 1976
Marco has decided that he's going to slip away on a ship bound for Brazil. So, he goes to sneak in there at night when it was raining cats & dogs.
15	"Sail on, Folgore"; Transliteration: "Susume Forugooregō" (Japanese: すすめフォルゴーレ号)	April 11, 1976
Marco was found on the ship the next morning. But due to his passionate plea, the chef-leonardo, a friendly Brazilian called Rocky, and his dad, who went there to get him, became convinced enough to let him go.
16	"A Little Cook"; Transliteration: "Chiisana kokkuchō" (Japanese: ちいさなコック長)	April 18, 1976
Marco spends his days on the ship cooking & serving meals, cleaning clothes & learning about sailor stuff.
17	"Neptune's Revel"; Transliteration: "Akamichi matsuri" (Japanese: 赤道まつり)	April 25, 1976
Marco has caught a big fish & cooks it for the crew, & then at night they have a party for crossing the equator. In that party there was all sorts of trickery & jolly merriment.
18	"Rio Immigrant Ship"; Transliteration: "Rio no iminsen" (Japanese: リオの移民船)	May 2, 1976
Marco has reached Rio port, but the actual designated would need 10-15 days to be repaired. He doesn’t have that time, so Chef Leonardo & Rocky find a ship for him just before it departs for Buenos Aires. After just catching in the nick of time, Marco sees the ship is filled with diseased & exhausted patients.
19	"Shining Stars of the Southern Cross"; Transliteration: "Kagayaku minami jūjisei" (Japanese: かがやく南十字星)	May 9, 1976
Marco shares his food with the children in the ship & helps lil’ nino get to his mum after he got lost.
20	"Night of the Big Storm"; Transliteration: "Ooarashi no yoru" (Japanese: おおあらしの夜)	May 16, 1976
During a raging storm, Nino’s grandpa calms everyone’s nerves by imploring them to sing aloud. Come the next morning, the ship comes into the storm barely surviving
21	"The La Plata Is the River of Silver"; Transliteration: "Rapurata gawa wa gin no kawa" (Japanese: ラプラタ川は銀の川)	May 23, 1976
With a heavy heart & fears of seeing his mum dead, Marco crosses the La Plata River & have finally reached Buenos Aires.
22	"Town Where Mother Is"; Transliteration: "kā-chan no iru machi" (Japanese: かあさんのいる街)	May 30, 1976
Marco leaves for Uncle Merelli's house, his contact with mum and then rojas residence where his mum used to work. He finds out that, merelli has left his house 1 month ago and his mum could be behia belli, southern town. But Hopping a train in that direction wouldn't work as he got pickpocketed in the docks, leaving completely dejected.
23	"Another Mother"; Transliteration: "Mō hitori no Okā-chan" (Japanese: もうひとりのおかあさん)	June 6, 1976
The station attendees inform him of going to the immigration bureau for help. There, he gets to know a woman named Anna lying sick in the nearby Santa Fe hospital. He finds her there, but she wasn't the one. But still Marco stays by her side until her death, and then they learn that she was actually calling out to her dead son Marcello in her delirious state. The nun gave Marco some clothes, a meal, and some money so he could find good leads.
24	"Fiolina Waiting"; Transliteration: "Mattete kureta Fioriina" (Japanese: 待っててくれたフィオリーナ)	June 13, 1976
While looking for Peppino troupe in the plaza, Fiolina ends up finding him and then the family, after having a meal, decide that they will go to Bahia Blanca in a travelling circus carriage to help Marco.
25	"Peppino's Band Is a Hit"; Transliteration: "Peppiino ichiza dai atari" (Japanese: ペッピーノ一座大あたり)	June 20, 1976
Marco goes to the consulate, as the immigration bureau was dillydalying too much, to look into his mother's whereabouts. There he does get somewhat sufficient confirmation that his mum could be in Bahia Blanca, a town 600-km south from here. He, then helps the Peppino troupe make a caravan capable of reaching a town that far from here, in boca. To pay for that, the Peppino troupe organizes their final show here and is able to make enough to pay for the newly made carriage and the long trip southward.
26	"To the Pampa"; Transliteration: "Sōgen e" (Japanese: 草原へ)	June 27, 1976
At dawn they start their long journey. After going for some time, they stop for some luncheon. Fiolina and marco are sent to get some dry wood for making fire. They find a fine gentleman named Salvador hunting swamp ducks, who turns out to be a jolly fellow who invites them to his ranch. After much discussion, marco and the peppino troupe decide to go toward that direction.
27	"Fiolina's Tears"; Transliteration: "Fioriina no namida" (Japanese: フィオリーナの涙)	July 4, 1976
Fiolina thinks the story of Marco finding his mom should be the subject of the troupe's next play. But during the rehearsal of the play, she starts crying as she remembers her own mum, who abandoned their entire family. Later on, she proclaims that this is her reason for wanting marco to reunite with his mother so much.
28	"Barbossa Ranch"; Transliteration: "Baruboosa dai bokujō" (Japanese: バルボーサ大牧場)	July 11, 1976
The troupe and marco reach barbarossa ranch. To appease the owners even more, mr. peppino suddenly changes the script of the play and have marco's mother die in his arms right after she reunites with him. This causes marco and fiolina much emotional distress. Concetta, then forces mr. peppino to stop any more delay in their journey and come next morning they start for bahaia blanca once again.
29	"Snow Falls"; Transliteration: "Yuki ga furu" (Japanese: 雪がふる)	July 18, 1976
Marco and the peppino troupe are in the midpoint of their journey. But with one wheel of their carriage being wobbly and drinking water running out, they are in quite a pickle. Thankfully, it starts raining and with much physical effort they were able to reattach the broken wheel to the axle. But they couldn't go far as the wheel got stuck in a ditch. Fortunately, old gaucho carlos was their to take them in for the night.
30	"Old Gaucho Carlos"; Transliteration: "Rō gaucho Karurosu" (Japanese: 老ガウチョ カルロス)	July 25, 1976
Marco and the troupe leave Carlo's house, and after some time they end up in an inn. But at that inn, there was a very hostile fellow who demanded an entire bottle of rum and a dance with concetta at knifepoint from them. Marco and mr. peppino remain completely helpless, until the gaucho called carlos, just happens to arrive at just the knick of time and disarmes the scoundrel. Marco and the pepiino troupe remain at that inn for the night, after that tiresome experience.
31	"A Long Night"; Transliteration: "Nagai yoru" (Japanese: ながい夜)	August 1, 1976
Marco and the troupe has to survive an entire night against a puma in an abandoned inn where they have taken shelter.
32	"We Said Goodbye"; Transliteration: "Sayōnara to ie tara" (Japanese: さようならといえたら)	August 8, 1976
Marco and the troupe are almost at bahai blanca, but fiolina is saddened as that would mean, she would have to part with marco now, meaning she would be returning to her shy and reserved self, once again.
33	"No Mother"; Transliteration: "kā-chan ga inai" (Japanese: かあさんがいない)	August 15, 1976
After finding lodging in bahia blanca, marco finds and is able to ask mr. moretti about their uncle mr. merelli. He points out that there is no name like that familiar to him and the fact that his mother has not written could mean either that she has gone back or she has dies or dying. The very thought terrifies marco, so he decides to go back to Buenos Aires.
34	"I Need to Go Back to Genova"; Transliteration: "Jenoba e kaeritai" (Japanese: ジェノバに帰りたい)	August 22, 1976
Marco goes outside next day at dawn to find work from mr. domenico in a shabby place. But he fails. Mr. peppino thinks of making another show like in the barbarossa ranch to garner awareness about marco's mom. But unlikely that the miners will be here again with their hard earned money to spend twice in a week. Local assemblyman moretti then thinks of helping in that case. But marco finally voices his opinion that his grief is not an exhibition.
35	"Mother's Dear Writing"; Transliteration: "kā-chan no natsukashii moji" (Japanese: おかあさんのなつかしい文字)	August 29, 1976
While trying to sneak in a train to go to Buenos Aires, marco finds a vagrant looking man. As marco let him have his breakfast the previous day, the man was grateful enough to treat him to some lemonade. There, the guy hears about marco's trouble and becomes quite perturbed. Introducing himself as a Spaniard named Esterson, he informs marco that uncle merelli has passed away but he has given him something to give marco. The next day marco and the peppino troupe with him go to see him there and find the latest letter from marco's mother, anna rossi. There it is listed her address, which is situated back at buenos aires.
36	"Farewell, Bahia Blanca"; Transliteration: "Sayōnara Baia Buranka" (Japanese: さようならバイアブランカ)	September 5, 1976
Mr. Esterton is actually Marco's uncle Merelli, who had been stealing the money that Anna sent their family for his own greed. What's more, to hide this nefarious deed, he burnt all the other letters from Marco's mother explaining why the family wasn't getting the money. To make up for all this damage, Merelli essentially sold himself for one year so he could have the money to send Marco to Buenos Aires. Mr. peppino was able to figure it all out after asking around. But one last thing he let Merelli know was that Anna Rossi, Marco's mother, is not even in Buenos Aires right now. She's far up north, in Cordoba. Leading Marco to another bust.
37	"Endless Journey"; Transliteration: "Hateshinai tabi e" (Japanese: はてしない旅へ)	September 12, 1976
Marco arrived in Buenos Aires, only to find that the meqienez have moved, possibly with her mom, 3 months ago. The current residents were kind enough to give marco the address. Marco goes back to Bartender Fosco's and gives him the letter from Uncle Merelli, which must be forwarded to mr. Padovani, a bigwig in the Boca dockworks. After getting it, padovani explains everything to Marco, about Merelli's true nature and terrible misdeeds. Lastly but very reluctantly, he arranges to have Marco hop on a ship to Rosario, which will cut his journey to Córdoba by at least half.
38	"It's Also Hard for Mother"; Transliteration: "kā-chan datte tsurai noni" (Japanese: かあさんだってつらいのに)	September 19, 1976
While waiting for Mr. Fadobani to arrange travel for Marco's trip to Rosario, he helps out at Fosco's store. During the day, a crew member of the ship sailing to Rosario meets Marco and tells him to come to the port at night. For the rest of the day, Marco revisits the places he saw on his first day in Buenos Aires. After saying his goodbyes to Luiza and Fosco, Marco leaves for the port where he meets Mario and the ship. Overjoyed, Marco celebrates the fact that he will soon be able to see his mother.
39	"Rosy Daybreak in Rosario"; Transliteration: "Bara shoku no yoake rosario" (Japanese: ばら色のよあけロサリオ)	September 26, 1976
Once the ship sets sail to Rosario, the Captain is informed that Marco isn't paying for his ticket, thus leading to him being disdainful towards Marco. After learning that Marco is also from Genoa, the Captain bonds with him due to his love of their shared hometown. As the ship gets closer to its destination, Marco is full of despair; he begins to worry that his mother may no longer be in Cordoba, like his previous attempts to search for her. Therefore the Captain convinces Marco to stay hopeful, saying that he would keep searching for his mother even if she isn't in found in Cordoba. Thus, the crew is once again cheerful just in time to witness daybreak in Rosario.
40	"A Shining Italian Star"; Transliteration: "Kagayaku Itaria no hoshi hitotsu" (Japanese: かがやくイタリアの星一つ)	October 3, 1976
After parting ways with the crew of Andrea Doria, Captain and Mario, Marco heads over to Mr. Barientos' home as per the instructions by Mr. Fadobani. Upon arrival, he is told that Mr. Barientos isn't going to be home for another month, and is treated rudely by one of his servants, showing his scorn towards Italian immigrants. With low spirits, Marco decides he must get a job in order to go to Cordoba by himself. After many failed attempts, Marco stumbles upon Federico, father of Renata and Nino whom he met on the immigration ship earlier on his journey. After hearing Marco's story, Federico helps Marco by telling his story to an Italian restaurant in town in order to gain sympathy. The restaurant's customers are moved by Marco's struggles, and help out by donating money to help him buy a ticket to Cordoba where his mother supposedly lives.
41	"If I Could Go Home with Mother..."; Transliteration: "kā-chan to kaere tara..." (Japanese: かあさんと帰れたら…)	October 10, 1976
Saying farewell to Federico, Marco boards the train to Cordoba. On the train, he meets a family of a mother and her three children, reminding him of his own family. He also meets a group of burly men, mistaking them for burglars yet finding out they are kind at heart. Finally, the train arrives at Cordoba, and Marco begins his search for Mr. Mequinez, his mother's supposed employer, but upon arriving at Mequinez's door, Marco finds the house to be empty as no one replies to his desperate cries for his mother.
42	"New Friend Pablo"; Transliteration: "Atarashii tomodachi Paburo" (Japanese: 新しい友だちパブロ)	October 17, 1976
Marco finds out that mequinez family left like a month ago and currently there was no one able let him where they went. Marco in the meantime started staying under the roof of one pablo, an indigenous boy.
43	"Somewhere in This Town"; Transliteration: "Kono machi no doko ka ni" (Japanese: この街のどこかに)	October 24, 1976
Pablo has apparently found a mequinez family labeled carriage. After following it, he has the supposed house where marco's mother is employed. Marco can't wait to go there and find his mum there.
44	"I Want to Save Fuana"; Transliteration: "Fuana o tasuketai" (Japanese: フアナをたすけたい)	October 31, 1976
The man of the house introduces himself as victor mequinez, the brother of Ramon Mequinez under whom Marco's mom is working right now. He does give her the address of where she lives, along with the money to get there. But after returning to pablo's place, they see that juana, pablo's sisters, pneumonia has worsened after getting drenched in the rain. So marco spent all the money he received to call upon a doctor. In return, pablo decides to help marco sneak in a train toward tucuman, the very next morning.
45	"Far to the North"; Transliteration: "Harukana kita e" (Japanese: はるかな北へ)	November 7, 1976
Even after pablo got beaten up to make sure marco would be on that train, he couldn't go far. Because of amedio, he was found out 30 miles after leaving the station. From then he walked till nightfall and found a carriage. The carriage people were nice enough to give him space to travel near tucuman, where his mum lives.
46	"Trip by Cow-Drawn Carriage"; Transliteration: "Gyūsha no tabi" (Japanese: 牛車の旅)	November 14, 1976
marco has started the bumpy carriage ride. the constant shuffling starts taking a toll on him and becomes sick. Manuel takes pity in him and starts caring for him. But the other carriage dwellers start to treat a amedio as a plaything. To prevent that, a hlaf-sick marco starts polishing the lamps and bringing water. Manuel sees that and a clash ensures. In the end, the carriage master stops all the scuffle and they continue on their way.
47	"Mother Is at the Foot of That Mountain"; Transliteration: "Ano yama no fumoto ni kā-chan ga" (Japanese: あの山の麓にかあさんが)	November 21, 1976
the time has come for marco to leave the carriage and head on his own way to tucuman. After leading up some rations and water, he heads riding on the donley called old lady. After an entire day, he rests in the hut of kindly old lady who served him breakfast the very next day. Then marco gets back on his way to tucuman, which should take 5 days.
48	"Don't Die, My Burro"; Transliteration: "Roba yo shinanaide" (Japanese: ロバよ死なないで)	November 28, 1976
marco keeps going on. As he doesn't have much money, he opts not ot stay in inns. Rather stay in open fields and take food for kind home dwellers. But the 20-year-old donkey named old lady isn't able to handle all this strain. It dies right before reaching a village close to tucuman.
49	"Mother's Calling"; Transliteration: "kā-chan ga yonde iru" (Japanese: かあさんが呼んでいる)	December 5, 1976
Marco has started toward tucuman with no ride and a torn left shoe. That left shoe causes him an injury, but he doesn't let up. He goes on through dusty road and snowy weather. To the point he starts crawling, as his feet injury has made it too painful. Back at the mequinez house, anna rossi is suffering from fever and calling out to marco.
50	"Run, Marco!"; Transliteration: "Hashire Maruko!" (Japanese: 走れマルコ!)	December 12, 1976
Marco has been saved from his near death situation by a passing horse rider. He gives him food, treats the wounded toe and then sets him off again on his journey. after going for some time, he approaches a village. There a kindly carriage rider offers him a trip to the mequinez factory. After getting off there, he learns that, his mama is sick. So dashes to the farm where his mama lives.
51	"Finally to Mother"; Transliteration: "Tōtō kā-chan ni" (Japanese: とうとうかあさんに)	December 19, 1976
marco has finally reached his mama. Anna rossi finally sees her marco after 2 whole years, which gives her the energy to bear the brunt of an urgent operation.
52	"Back to Genova with Mother"; Transliteration: "kā-chan to Jenoba e" (Japanese: かあさんとジェノバへ)	December 26, 1976
After spending some time for mama's recovery, the two go back home to genoa. On the way, every single person who helped Marco was able to see them off. On the train tracks, pablo and his sister juana bade them good bye. In the rosario bar, where marco was crowdfunded the fee for the train trip, they gave both of them a celebratory song performance. And last but not least, at the burnos aires harbour, fiolina nd the peppino troupe got to meet them. They shared all their experiences together. Back home, the four of them were finally able to reunite as a family.
