= Isao Takahata =

Japanese filmmaker and producer (1935–2018)

- 高畑 勲
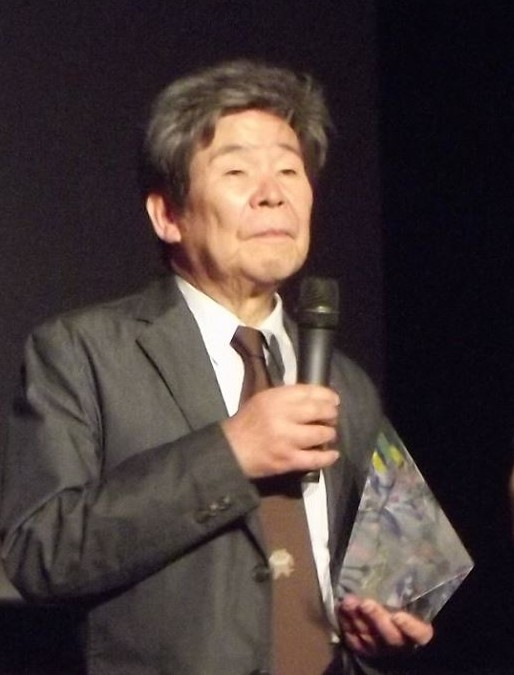
- Takahata at the 2014 Annecy International Animated Film Festival
- Born: October 29, 1935; Ise, Mie, Japan
- Died: April 5, 2018 (aged 82); Tokyo, Japan
- Other names: Tetsu Takemoto (武元 哲); Isao Yamashita; Paku-san
- Education: University of Tokyo
- Occupations: Film director; Animation director; Screenwriter; producer; storyboard artist
- Years active: 1961–2018
- Employers: Toei Animation; Nippon Animation; Telecom Animation Film; Studio Ghibli
- Children: 1
- Awards: Medal of Honor with Purple Ribbon (1998); Honorific Leopard, Locarno Film Festival (2009); Special Cristal for lifetime achievement, Annecy International Animation Film Festival (2014); Officier of the Ordre des Arts et des Lettres (2015); Winsor McCay Award (2015)

Isao Takahata (高畑 勲, Takahata Isao; October 29, 1935 – April 5, 2018) was a Japanese director, screenwriter and producer. A co-founder of Studio Ghibli, he earned international critical acclaim for his work as a director of Japanese animated feature films.

Born in Ujiyamada, Mie Prefecture, Takahata joined Toei Animation after graduating from the University of Tokyo in 1959. He worked as an assistant director, holding various positions over the years and eventually directing his own film, The Great Adventure of Horus, Prince of the Sun (1968). Under Nippon Animation he directed the television series Heidi, Girl of the Alps (1974), 3000 Leagues in Search of Mother (1976), and Anne of Green Gables (1979). He also collaborated with colleague Hayao Miyazaki on Nausicaä of the Valley of the Wind (1984) and Castle in the Sky (1986).

Takahata, Miyazaki and others formed Studio Ghibli in 1985, where he would direct Grave of the Fireflies (1988), Only Yesterday (1991), Pom Poko (1994), and My Neighbors the Yamadas (1999). His last film as director was The Tale of the Princess Kaguya (2013), which was nominated for an Academy Award in the category of Best Animated Feature Film at the 87th Academy Awards.

== Personal life ==
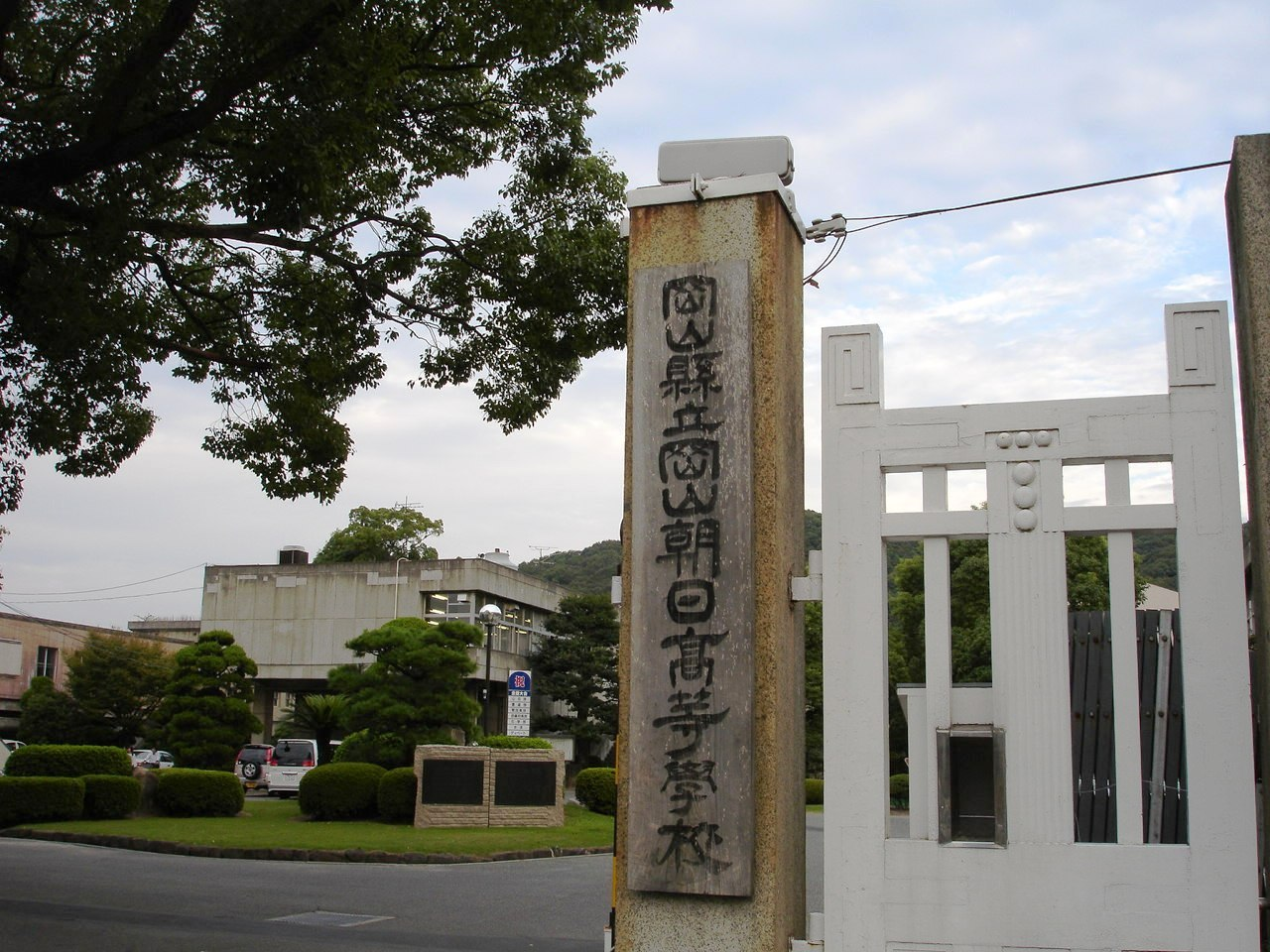
Okayama Asahi Prefectural High School, Takahata's high school

Takahata was born in Ujiyamada (now Ise), Mie Prefecture, Japan, on October 29, 1935, as the youngest of seven siblings and third son in the family. His father, Asajirō Takahata (1888–1984), was a junior high school principal, who became the education chief of Okayama prefecture after the war. On June 29, 1945, when Takahata was nine years old, he and his family survived a major United States air raid on Okayama City. During the raid, Takahata and his sibling were separated from their family for two days, which he called "the worst experience of his life." In 1954, he graduated from Okayama Asahi Prefectural High School and entered the University of Tokyo.

== Career ==
=== Early career ===
Takahata graduated from the University of Tokyo in 1959 with a degree in French literature. During this time at the school, he had seen the French film Le Roi et l'Oiseau (The King and the Mockingbird), which led him to become interested in animation. Takahata was more interested in animation as a medium, and wanted to write and direct for animated works rather than create animations himself. A friend suggested he apply for a directing job at Toei Animation; Takahata passed their entrance exam, and was hired as an assistant director for several of Toei's animated television shows and films including Wolf Boy Ken, on which he was mentored by Yasuo Ōtsuka. Tze-yue G. Hu, author of Frames of Anime, reports that Takahata was one of a small number of university graduates recruited by Toei in 1959 and later trained as animation directors. At Toei, Takahata, Miyazaki, and Michiyo Yasuda were officials in the animation workers' union. Ōtsuka eventually asked Takahata to direct an animated feature film of his own; his directorial debut was The Great Adventure of Horus, Prince of the Sun (1968). Ōtsuka served as Animation Director on the film, while another Toei employee, Hayao Miyazaki, served as key animator. Toei screened Horus, Prince of the Sun in cinemas for only 10 days. Though it would later be recognized as one of the first defining works of modern Japanese animation, the film was a commercial failure, and Takahata was demoted to an assistant director on TV anime. His later Toei works were Secret Little Akko and Kitaro of GeGeGe.

Unable to further improve his standing at Toei, Takahata left the studio in 1971, along with Miyazaki and Yōichi Kotabe. Takahata and Miyazaki came up with the idea of creating an animated feature film based on the stories of Pippi Longstocking. They developed the idea along with "A Production", an animated studio formed by another former Toei animator, Daikichiro Kusube (the company became Shin-Ei Animation). Zuiyo Enterprise had produced the 1969 Moomin for the Calpis Comic Theater by contracting Tokyo Movie Shinsha, which worked with A Production on the series; this earlier children's-literature adaptation helped make A Production appear to Takahata and Miyazaki as a studio where television animation could support meaningful literary projects rather than routine commercial work. Takahata and Miyazaki had developed a number of storyboards and had flown out to Sweden for location shots, to meet with the books' author, Astrid Lindgren, and secure the rights for the character. However they could not reach an agreement with the rightsholders, and were forced to drop the project. The failed project became a provisional bridge between Takahata's Toei period and his later work in literary television animation. Takahata and Miyazaki collaborated at A Production on several other animation projects from 1971 to 1974, including taking over production of the anime series Lupin III at Ōtsuka's request, due to its poor ratings. They also made Panda! Go, Panda! for TMS around this time, which utilized some of the scenes, character designs, and concepts developed for the Longstocking project. Takahata directed the film, Miyazaki wrote it and designed scene layouts. Takahata tried to make Panda! Go, Panda more audience-friendly than his first directed one. Panda! Go, Panda! and its sequel were commercial successes.

=== Nippon Animation ===
Not long afterward, Takahata, Kotabe, and Miyazaki were approached by the studio Zuiyo Enterprise to create an animated series based on the novel Heidi, which resulted in Heidi, Girl of the Alps (this also incorporated some of their work from the Pippi Longstocking concept). Takahata gave Heidi, Girl of the Alps a predominantly realistic style, that shows changing seasons, weather, rural work, cooking, and small details of the everyday life in the Alps. Heidi, Girl of the Alps was the sixth and final entry in Calpis Comic Theater. Although the series was successful, Zuiyo entered financial difficulties after Heidi's TV production costs exceeded international sales. In the 1975 reorganization, the financial and rights-holding side remained with Zuiyo. The animation production section of Zuiyo was established as a subsidiary company named Zuiyo Eizo, later becoming Nippon Animation, which Takahata and Miyazaki joined. During this period, He directed three long-form literary adaptations: Heidi, Girl of the Alps, 3000 Leagues in Search of Mother, and Anne of Green Gables. He also contributed storyboards to other Zuiyo and Nippon works, including A Dog of Flanders, Monarch: The Big Bear of Tallac, and The Story of Perrine.

3000 Leagues in Search of Mother followed Heidi and had all 52 episodes made with Takahata as director and Miyazaki in charge of layout and scene composition. This series connected Takahata's approach with his interest in Italian neorealism, particularly its focus on children from the working class, their struggles, and their experiences within socio-economic hardships of child labour.

Miyazaki began directing Future Boy Conan for NHK in late 1977, after Takahata refused Nippon's plans to direct The Story of Perrine. Animétudes states that Takahata's refusal led Miyazaki, Yōichi Kotabe, Oh! Production, and other artists to avoid Perrine, opening the way for Miyazaki's directorial debut on Future Boy Conan. Takahata assisted Miyazaki with storyboards, direction, and he wrote episodes from 7 to 13.

By turning down Perrine, Takahata had little choice but to accept the next assignment that came his way, which was: Anne of Green Gables. Though initially thought unadaptable for animation, being "full of dialogue, lacking in dramatic developments and narrative shifts Thus Takahata directed the World Masterpiece Theater adaptation of Anne of Green Gables in 1979. For Anne of Green Gables, Takahata and the production team used location research on Prince Edward Island to reproduce the setting, architecture, and atmosphere of the original novel. A 2015 Ghibli Museum research report identifies Yoshifumi Kondō as animation director on the series and states that Miyazaki, who had participated in screen composition and layout for the first 15 episodes, left Nippon Animation during production and moved to Telecom Animation Film. The move followed Yasuo Ōtsuka's offer to Miyazaki at Nippon Animation after Ōtsuka had been assigned to direct the next theatrical Lupin III film which Miyazaki accepted. Takahata commanded over the screenwriting. He was credited as sole writer on several episodes and co-writer on many others. Producer Junzo Nakajima said that Takahata examined every cut, which contributed to the series' severe production schedule. Disrupted scheduling had a severe effect on the staff's health. Character designer Yoshifumi Kondō refused to quit work while receiving treatment for a serious lung disease, refusing hospitalization to finish the series. Art director Masahiro Ioka regularly operated on a loop of sleep deprivation to personally redraw, correct, and hand-paint massive volumes of background art under tight weekly deadlines. During this decade, Takahata directed and storyboarded long-form literary adaptation.

After Anne ended on 30 December 1979, Takahata left Nippon in early 1980. He joined Kotabe, Okuyama, and Miyazaki at Telecom Animation Film. He began work on Jarinko Chie in September 1980, releasing it in April 1981.

=== Telecom Animation Film ===
Around 1980, Takahata left Nippon to join Telecom Animation Film Co., Ltd. (a subsidiary of Tokyo Movie Shinsha or TMS Entertainment), where he led production of an animated feature based on the manga Jarinko Chie, and a subsequent television spinoff. Animation work on the film began in September 1980, and it was released in April 1981. During the same period, Takahata also wrote and directed Gauche the Cellist, a 1982 animated feature based on Kenji Miyazawa's short story Gauche the Cellist. It surfaced Takahata's demanding, observational style. Takahata's focused on realistic musical performance. The project relied on a small core staff, primarily background artist Takamura Mukuo and key animator Shunji Saida from Oh! Production. Production extended the 63-minute film's production to six years. Key animator Saida went to learn to play cello so that Gauche's fingering could be animated without mistakes. Around 1982, Telecom came up with the idea of an animated feature film Little Nemo: Adventures in Slumberland which adapted the Little Nemo comic, which was to feature joint direction between Japanese and American animation techniques. The project had been pursued since 1978, when producer Yutaka Fujioka, founder of TMS Entertainment, approached George Lucas about a film adaptation; Lucas and later Chuck Jones found problems with the narrative, before the project was announced in 1982 and Gary Kurtz was hired into directing the American side. The project was developed as a Japanese-American co-production and involved figures including Ray Bradbury, Gary Kurtz, Moebius, Frank Thomas, and Ollie Johnston. While both Takahata and Miyazaki were originally involved, they opted to leave the project and Telecom itself due to discord between the Japanese and American project directions. More specifically, Miyazaki left Telecom in November 1982 after his proposals for the project were rejected, and Takahata, who succeeded him as the Japanese-side director, also left in March 1983 after Kurtz rejected his direction plan.

=== Studio Ghibli ===
Concurrent to these events, Miyazaki had made his own directorial debut in the Lupin III feature film The Castle of Cagliostro in 1979, which was a critical success. Following Cagliostro, Miyazaki began developing his own manga, Nausicaä of the Valley of the Wind, and directing its 1984 film adaptation, which was commercially and critically successful. Takahata served as producer on the film, which was animated at Topcraft before the formation of Studio Ghibli. Napier writes that Takahata producing the film reassured Miyazaki while working with Topcraft's unfamiliar team. Takahata introduced Joe Hisaishi, starting his long association with Miyazaki. The success of Nausicaä helped create the financial and professional basis for a new studio. Miyazaki approached Takahata with the idea of co-founding an animation studio for theatrical features, and Studio Ghibli was subsequently formed in 1985 by Miyazaki, Takahata, Toshio Suzuki, and Yasuyoshi Tokuma, with financial support from Tokuma Shoten. Studio Ghibli opened on 15 June 1985 in Kichijōji, Tokyo. Miyazaki and Takahata founded the studio to produce original, high-quality feature films as an alternative to the stagnation of television-derived animation.

In 1985, Miyazaki researched Wales for Castle in the Sky, Takahata and Suzuki remained in Japan planning the new studio. Takahata produced Miyazaki's Castle in the Sky. Napier states that Takahata insisted the studio spare no expense in producing Castle in the Sky, whose fluid animation, detailed settings, and imaginative designs helped establish a new standard for Japanese animation. In 1987, Takahata directed the documentary The Story of Yanagawa's Canals, a mix of nature and engineering that failed to attract audience.

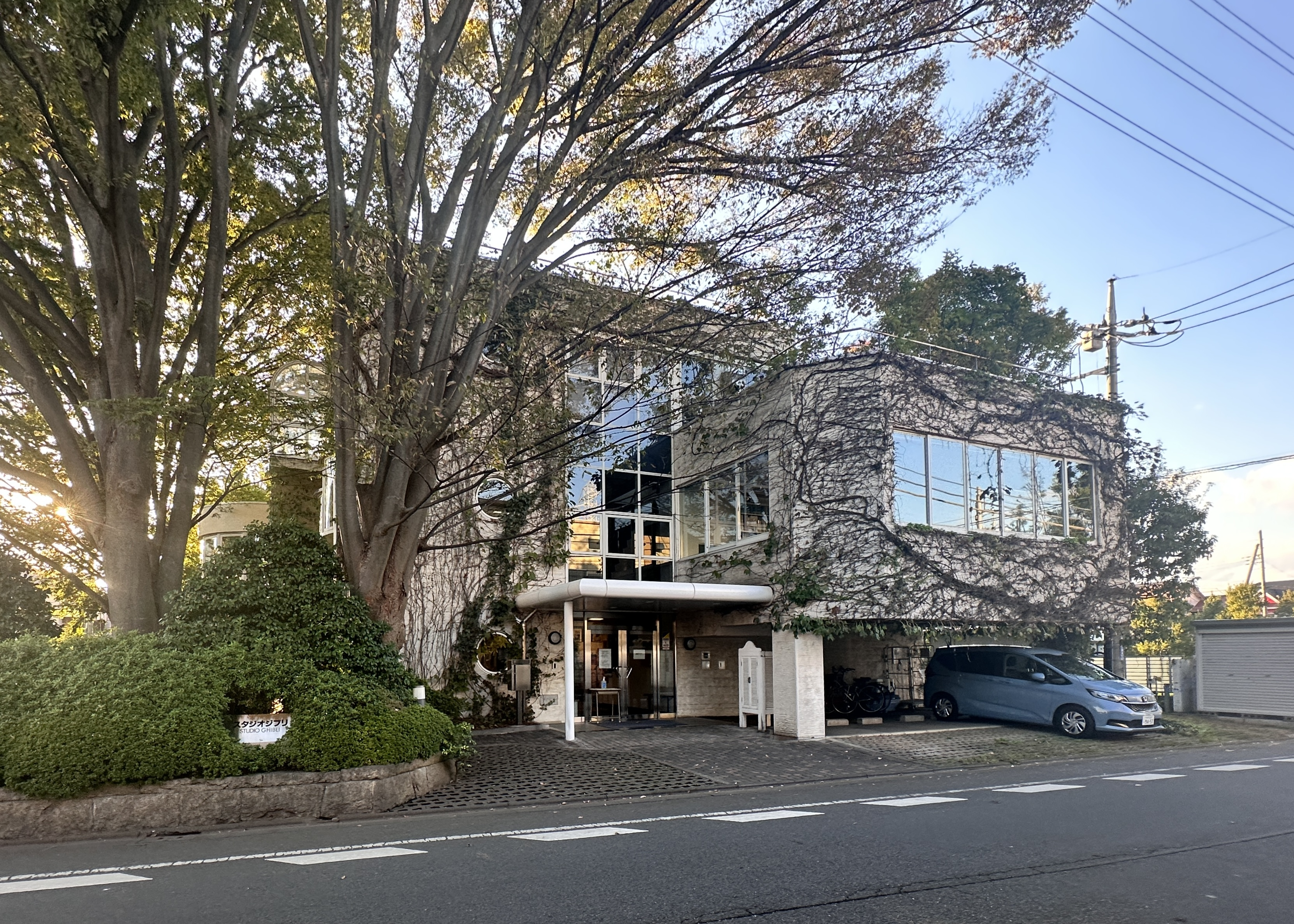
Studio Ghibli's later headquarters in Koganei, Tokyo.

The studio primarily released animated feature films that were directed by Miyazaki, with Takahata serving as producer or in other roles. Takahata did direct several Studio Ghibli films as well. His first, Grave of the Fireflies, released in 1988, was based on the semi-autobiographical short story of the same name written by Akiyuki Nosaka, but Takahata was also partially inspired by his own experiences from the bombing of Okayama City. The film was released in 1988 as a double feature with Miyazaki's My Neighbor Totoro, contrasting Takahata's grim portrayal of wartime Japan with Miyazaki's postwar rural idyll. Both films ran in parallel during Ghibli's early years, requiring a second studio in 1987. The studio struggled to balance quality with tight deadlines under resource constraints. Despite high commercial risks and distribution challenges, Tokuma Shoten's president Yasuyoshi Tokuma personally brokered a deal to rescue the dual release. Released as a package in April, the double feature earned modest box-office returns; Ghibli lacks individual earnings data. Grave of the Fireflies received critical acclaim for its emotional impact and anti-war themes, and is considered the film that established the international esteem of Studio Ghibli. Takahata rejected the anti-war reading as reductive. He viewed Seita's tragedy not as anti-war, but as the outcome of his prideful isolation and his defiance against society, which destroyed the family unit he sought to protect. Takahata's posthumous notebooks reveal he introduced "F Seita", a new phantom observer who retrospectively witnesses and intervenes in the narration of the siblings' experiences. Production notebooks and testimony were the subject of a 2025 NHK Educational Television documentary. The financial recovery came slowly. Totoro merchandise, first produced two years later after a manufacturer's independent push, generated sustained revenue that helped Ghibli recoup losses from the modest theatrical run. Licensing success turned Totoro from a risk into the studio's symbol and brand asset. Despite uneven merchandise revenue, Ghibli prioritized creative vision over fan service or consumer preferences, refusing to alter films for marketability.

After Grave of the Fireflies, Takahata remained involved in Miyazaki's productions, serving as music director on Kiki's Delivery Service in 1989. In a later discussion, Takahata explained that the role involved handling, at Miyazaki's request. He approached the film with a dramatic, character-first sensibility, prioritizing emotional themes over its action or fantasy elements. He sought music for a local Western Europe character. He intentionally left sorrowful moments unscored. Takahata used a recurring waltz to trace Kiki's emotional journey.Miyazaki's storyboards included a field for dialogue, sound effects, and background music instructions. Takahata directed music using storyboards that had cut details, visuals, movement, along with audio, and timing. On Kiki's Delivery Service, Takahata was credited as music director, apart from Joe Hisaishi, who received the music credit. According to Suzuki, Takahata supported the selection of Arai and gave the team a detailed explanation of her music. Over 200 pages of Toshio Suzuki's notes survive from Kiki's Delivery Service music meetings, documenting Takahata's work. Takahata discussed the dramatic significance of Kiki's radio and its role in the film's opening. Takahata proposed using Kiki's radio at both the opening and ending for structural effect. Takahata considered the radio a symbol of Kiki's dreams and growth.

In April 1989, Takahata published an outline for the unrealized Border 1939 feature film, based on Shin Shikata's novel The Border. The proposed film followed a Japanese student travelling through Japanese occupied Korea, Manchuria, China and Mongolia in search of a missing friend during the Second Sino-Japanese War and the later Pacific War. While Grave of the Fireflies depicted Japanese civilian suffering at the war's end, Border 1939 focused on Japan's colonial expansion at its start. The project addressed the psychological tension between national identity and acknowledging national aggression. Takahata sought to challenge an introspective centred on Japanese wartime victimhood by confronting younger viewers with Japanese militarism, colonization, and wartime aggression. He aimed to use real-world settings for animation rather than sci-fi or fantasy, strengthen younger viewers' historical consciousness of Japan's imperialism, and raise an internationalist understanding of identity. The proposal emerged amid wartime-history disputes. The 1982 Neighbouring Country Clause, Yasuhiro Nakasone's Yasukuni Shrine visit, debates over the Nanjing Massacre, Unit 731 and comfort women, and Hirohito's death renewed controversy. Takahata published his outline for Border 1939 on 17 April 1989. The project preceded the Tiananmen crackdown of 4 June. After the 1989 Tiananmen Square events, Japanese views of China worsened. The distributor interpreted the rise in anti-Chinese sentiment as heightened political risk, judging the Chinese setting would reduce marketability. Withdrew support before animation. No development artwork has been released. Most of the surviving material is Takahata's outline, later reprinted in his Eiga o tsukurinagara kangaeta koto (Thoughts While Making Movies).

Also in 1989, Takahata supervised at Nippon Animation a 100-minute compilation film of the opening six episodes of his 1979 directed and written television series Anne of Green Gables. Producer Junzō Nakajima proposed a television serial compilation of the original 50 episodes. Takahata rejected that proposal and instead proposed isolating its opening narrative arc, ending with Anne's acceptance at Green Gables, as a self-contained feature. Takahata described the overall film editing as minimal. Original TV materials were not changed, except for removing the transition between episodes three and four The 1989 compilation film was named Anne of Green Gables: Road to Green Gables, but it did not receive a theatre release, although Takahata recalled attending a screening in Hiroshima. Film unreleased for 20+ years before Toshio Suzuki brought it to the attention of the Ghibli Museum, which digitally remastered and theatrically released it in Japan on 17 July 2010. The museum distributed the release with Studio Ghibli, Nippon Television and Disney, while Nippon Animation remained copyright holder.

On 17 November 1989, Takahata made a field research in Takahata along with Suzuki, interviewing organic farmers Ryuichi Ninomiya and Goichi Endo for about three hours about farming, rural marriage and urbans and rurals agricultural volunteering, Yamagata dialect, and humanity's relationship with nature. Takahata later returned repeatedly for maintaining ties with the farmers.

He returned to feature direction with Only Yesterday, for which Miyazaki served as production producer and Toshio Suzuki as producer. Other Ghibli films which Takahata served as director included Only Yesterday (1991), Pom Poko (1994) and My Neighbors the Yamadas (1999).

=== Later career ===
Takahata announced that he would direct one last film for Studio Ghibli, The Tale of the Princess Kaguya (Kaguya-hime no Monogatari, 2013). "Someday we should make a Japanese Heidi", Takahata and Miyazaki had both agreed after making Heidi noting its similarities to the Princess Kaguya story. Heidi's carefree depiction, Takahata had told one journalist, "stems from my ideal image of what a child should be like". When the film arrived in Western markets the following year, it was nominated for the Best Animated Feature at the 87th Academy Awards. Takahata continued to work at Ghibli, serving as an artistic producer for The Red Turtle (2016), the first feature film of Dutch animator and director Michaël Dudok de Wit in collaboration with Ghibli. The film premiered in September 2016.

== Death ==
Takahata had been diagnosed with lung cancer, and died on April 5, 2018, at Teikyo University hospital in Tokyo, at the age of 82. On May 15, 2018, a farewell ceremony for Takahata was held at the Ghibli Museum in Tokyo. Hayao Miyazaki publicly spoke for the first time about Takahata's death, saying "I was convinced that Paku-san [Takahata's nickname] would live to be 95 years old, but he unfortunately passed away. It makes me think my time is also limited...Thank you, Paku-san."

== Influences and style ==
Takahata was influenced by the works of Paul Grimault, a French animator, as well as French New Wave directors, including Jean-Luc Godard. He was also influenced by French-born Canadian director Frédéric Back, including his works Crac and The Man Who Planted Trees. He felt it was important to be able to achieve trompe-l'œil, the illusion of three dimensions using a two-dimensional medium.

Takahata's films had a major influence on Hayao Miyazaki, prompting animator Yasuo Ōtsuka to suggest that Miyazaki learned his sense of social responsibility from Takahata and that without him, Miyazaki would probably have been interested in comic book material. As with Miyazaki, Takahata and Michel Ocelot were great admirers of each other's work. Ocelot names Takahata's Grave of the Fireflies and Pom Poko among his favorite films.

== TV works ==
Television series directed or storyboarded by Isao Takahata
Year(s)	Title	Romanized Japanese title	Role	Episodes / notes
1963–1965	Ken the Wolf Boy	Ōkamishōnen Ken	Advisor, director	Directed episodes 6, 14, 19, 24, 32, 38, 45, 51, 58, 66, 72 and 80; Episode 6 credited to the pseudonym "Isao Yamashita"
1965	Hustle Punch	Hassuru Panchi	Director	Opening credits only
1968–1969	Kitaro of GeGeGe	GeGeGe no Kitarō	Storyboard artist	Episode 62 only
1969–1970	The Secret of Akko-chan	Himitsu no Akko-chan	Assistant director	Based on Fujio Akatsuka's magical girl manga
1969–1970	Ataro the Workaholic	Mōretsu Atarō	Storyboard artist, director	Storyboarded episodes 10, 14, 36, 44, 51, 59, 71, 77 and 90; Directed opening credits for episodes 70–90
1971–1972	GeGeGe no Kitarō – Vol. 2	GeGeGe no Kitarō	Storyboard artist	Episode 5; also directed opening and closing credits
1971–1972	Apache Baseball Team	Apatchi Yakyūgun	Storyboard artist	Episodes 2, 12 and 17
1971–1972	Lupin III	Rupan Sansei	Director	Cleanup for episodes 6, 9 and 12; Directed episodes 7–8, 10–11 and 13–23 with Hayao Miyazaki
1972–1973	Suzunosuke of the Red Cuirass	Akadō Suzunosuke	Director	Based on a jidaigeki manga by Eiichi Fukui and Tsunayoshi Takeuchi
1973–1974	Isamu, Boy of the Wilderness	Kōya no Shōnen Isamu	Storyboard artist, director	Storyboarded episodes 15 and 18; directed episode 15
1974	Heidi, Girl of the Alps	Arupusu no Shōjo Haiji	Series director, storyboard artist	Storyboarded episodes 1–3
1975	Dog of Flanders	Furandāsu no Inu	Storyboard artist	Episode 15 only
1976	3000 Leagues in Search of Mother	Haha o Tazunete Sanzenri	Series director, storyboard artist	Storyboarded episodes 1–2, 4–5 and 7
1977	Monarch: The Big Bear of Tallac	Seton Doubutsuki: Kuma no Ko Jacky	Storyboard artist	Episodes 5 and 8
1978	Future Boy Conan	Mirai Shōnen Konan	Director, storyboard artist	Storyboarded episodes 7, 13 and 20; Storyboarded and directed episodes 9–10 with Hayao Miyazaki
1978	The Story of Perrine	Perīnu Monogatari	Storyboard artist	Episodes 3 and 6
1979	Anne of Green Gables	Akage no An	Director, writer, storyboard artist	Directed and wrote episodes 1–4, 6, 8, 10, 12–13, 17–18, 20, 23, 25–44 and 47–50; Storyboarded episodes 1–4 and 29
1981–1983	Chie the Brat	Jarinko Chie	Series director, storyboard artist	Episodes 2, 6 and 11 credited to the pseudonym "Tetsu Takemoto"

== Filmography ==
Year	Title	Director	Writer	Producer	AD	Notes
1961	The Littlest Warrior				Yes	Based upon Mori Ōgai's Sansho the Bailiff
1962	Interesting History of Civilization, Story of Iron				Yes	Takahata was also a script supervisor
1963	The Little Prince and the Eight-Headed Dragon				Yes	
1963	Duel of the Underworld				Yes	Directed by Umetsugu Inoue
1968	The Great Adventure of Horus, Prince of the Sun	Yes				
1972	Panda! Go, Panda!	Yes				Short film; written by Hayao Miyazaki
1973	Panda! Go, Panda! The Rainy-Day Circus	Yes				Short film; written by Miyazaki
1981	Jarinko Chie	Yes	Yes			
1982	Gauche the Cellist	Yes	Yes			
1984	Nausicaä of the Valley of the Wind			Yes		Directed by Miyazaki
1986	Castle in the Sky			Yes		Directed by Miyazaki
1987	The Story of Yanagawa's Canals	Yes	Yes			Documentary
1988	Grave of the Fireflies	Yes	Yes			Takahata's first film for Studio Ghibli
1989	Kiki's Delivery Service					Directed by Miyazaki; Takahata was musical director
1991	Only Yesterday	Yes	Yes			
1994	Pom Poko	Yes	Yes			
1999	My Neighbors the Yamadas	Yes	Yes			
2003	Winter Days	Yes	Yes			Collaborative movie; Takahata created segment 28
2013	The Kingdom of Dreams and Madness					Documentary featuring interviews with Takahata
2013	The Tale of the Princess Kaguya	Yes	Yes			Takahata's final film as director
2016	The Red Turtle			Yes		Directed by Michaël Dudok de Wit; Takahata was artistic producer
