= Yasuo Ōtsuka =

Japanese animator (1931–2021)

- 大塚康生
- Born: July 11, 1931; Shimane Prefecture, Japan
- Died: March 15, 2021 (aged 89)
- Occupations: Animator and character designer
- Years active: 1956–2021

Yasuo Ōtsuka (大塚康生, Ōtsuka Yasuo; July 11, 1931 – March 15, 2021) was a Japanese animator who worked with Toei Animation, Nippon Animation, TMS Entertainment, and Studio Ghibli. He was considered to be one of Japan's foremost animators, and he was an important mentor to both Hayao Miyazaki and Isao Takahata.

== Biography ==
Ōtsuka was born in Shimane Prefecture. During a visit to Tsuwano at the age of 10, he saw a steam locomotive for the first time. He began to take an interest in locomotives and their operation and would frequently sketch them. In 1945, his family moved to Yamaguchi Prefecture where there was a military base. He began to draw the array of military vehicles located there while also drawing a variety of subjects in different styles. Otsuka also collected cuttings of cartoon strips into scrapbooks to learn more about drawing styles. Otsuka joined Yamaguchi's Bureau of Statistics but later wanted to become a political cartoonist in Tokyo. However at the time, permission was needed to move to Tokyo so he applied to the Health and Welfare Ministry. After passing the exam, he was assigned to the drug enforcement division as an assistant who maintained the firearms of the agents. Around this time he suffered from tuberculosis.

== Career ==
In 1956, Otsuka saw an advertisement in the Yomiuri Shimbun where Toei was soliciting job applications for animators. After passing the test, Otsuka worked with Yasuji Mori and Akira Daikubara on The Tale of the White Serpent and learnt their approaches. Wanting to learn more animation theory, he began to seek out textbooks and was shown a textbook on US animation written by Preston Blair. After working on Magic Boy in 1959, his animation of a skeleton was unintentionally considered comical due to its realism. This led to comical bad guy characters becoming Otsuka's specialty. He came to believe that genuine realism doesn't suit animation and "constructed realism" is more suitable. Hayao Miyazaki compared Otsuka to Kenichi Enomoto in the use of this approach. After completion of his next film, The Wonderful World of Puss 'n Boots, Otsuka left Toei to join A Production.

Otsuka has written several books about the anime industry. His Sakuga Asemamire (作画汗まみれ) is considered "a prime resource for the history of 1960s and 1970s anime".

In July 2002, an exhibition of his work and personal pieces was held in Ginza.

From 2003 until his death, Otsuka was an advisor to Telecom Animation Film.

== Works ==
Year	Work
1957	Kitten's Scribbling (こねこのらくがき, Koneko no Rakugaki)
1957	New Adventures of Hanuman (ハヌマンの新しい冒険, Hanuman no Atarashii Bouken)
1957	Kappa no Pataro (かっぱのぱあ太郎)
1958	Yumemi Dōji (夢見童子)
1958	The Tale of the White Serpent (白蛇伝, Hakujaden)
1959	Tanuki-san no Ootari (たぬきさん大当り)
1959	Kuma to Kodomo-tachi (熊と子供たち)
1959	Magic Boy (少年猿飛佐助, Shounen Sarutobi Sasuke)
1960	Alakazam the Great (西遊記, Saiyuki)
1961	The Littlest Warrior (安寿と厨子王丸, Anju to Zushio-maru)
1962	Arabian Nights: Sinbad's Adventures (アラビアンナイト シンドバッドの冒険, Arabian Naito: Shindobaddo no Bôken)
1963	The Little Prince and the Eight-Headed Dragon (わんぱく王子の大蛇退治, Wanpaku Ōji no Orochi Taiji)
1963	Wolf Boy Ken (狼少年ケン, Ookami Shounen Ken)
1964	Samurai Kid (少年忍者風のフジ丸, Shounen Ninja Kaze no Fujimaru)
1965	Gulliver's Travels Beyond the Moon (ガリバーの宇宙旅行, Garibā no Uchū Ryokō)
1965	The Amazing 3 (W3 ワンダースリー, Wandā Surī) - Opening title
1965	Hustle Punch (ハッスルパンチ, Hassurupanchi)
1968	Star of the Giants (巨人の星, Kyojin no Hoshi)
1968	The Little Norse Prince (太陽の王子 ホルスの大冒険, Taiyou no Ouji: Horus no Daibouken)
1969	The Wonderful World of Puss 'n Boots (長靴をはいた猫, Nagagutsu o Haita Neko)
1969	Lupin III: Pilot Film (パイロットフィルム ルパン三世, Pairotto Firumu Rupan Sansei)
1969	Flying Phantom Ship (空飛ぶゆうれい船, Sora Tobu Yuurei Sen)
1969	Moomin (ムーミン, Mūmin)
1971	Animal Treasure Island (どうぶつ宝島, Doubutsu Takarajima)
1971	Tensai Bakabon (天才バカボン, Tensai Bakabon)
1971	Lupin III Part I (ルパン三世, Rupan Sansei)
1972	The Gutsy Frog (ど根性ガエル, Dokonjou Gaeru)
1972	Panda! Go, Panda! (パンダ・コパンダ, Panda go Panda)
1973	Panda! Go, Panda!: The Rainy-Day Circus (パンダ・コパンダ 雨降りサーカスの巻, Pando go Panda Amefuri Sākasu no Maki)
1973	Samurai Giants (侍ジャイアンツ, Samurai Jaiantsu)
1975	Adventures of Gamba (ガンバの冒險, Ganba no Bouken)
1976	3000 Leagues in Search of Mother (母をたずねて三千里, Haha o Tazunete Sanzenri)
1977	Tenguri, Boy of the Plains (草原の子テングリ, Sougen no Ko Tenguri)
1977	My Name Is Teppei (おれは鉄兵, Ore wa Teppei)
1978	Future Boy Conan (未来少年コナン, Mirai Shounen Conan)
1978	Lupin III: The Mystery of Mamo (ルパンvs複製人間, Rupan vs Fukusei-ningen)
1979	Lupin III: The Castle of Cagliostro (ルパン三世 カリオストロの城, Rupan Sansei Kariosuturo no Shiro)
1980	Lupin III Part II (ルパン三世, Rupan Sansei)
1981	Chie the Brat (じゃリン子チエ, Jarinko Chie)
1981	Kao Expert Theatre (花王名人劇場, Kaō Meijin Gekijō)
1984	Sherlock Hound (名探偵ホームズ, Meitantei Hōmuzu)
1987	Lupin III: The Fuma Conspiracy (ルパン三世 風魔一族の陰謀, Rupan Sansei: Fūma Ichizoku no Inbō)
1989	Little Nemo: Adventures in Slumberland (リトル・ニモ, Ritoru Nimo)
1991	Ozanari Dungeon: The Tower of Wind (おざなりダンジョン 風の塔, Ozanari Danjon: Kaze no Tō)
1995	Lupin III Esso Commercial (エッソ石油 ルパン三世篇 | Esso Sekiyu Rupan Sansei Hen)
2006	The Unbeatable Delivery Girl (無敵看板娘, Muteki Kanban Musume)
2007	Lupin III: Elusiveness of the Fog (ルパン三世 霧のエリューシヴ, Kiri no Eryūshivu)
