= Yoshifumi Kondō =

Japanese anime director (1950–1998)

- Born: 近藤 喜文; 31 March 1950; Gosen, Niigata Prefecture, Japan
- Died: 21 January 1998 (aged 47); Tachikawa, Tokyo, Japan
- Education: Tokyo Design College, Shin-Ei Animation, Nippon Animation, Telecom Animation Film, Studio Ghibli
- Known for: Anime
- Notable work: Whisper of the Heart (director), Anne of Green Gables, Sherlock Hound, Kiki's Delivery Service, Only Yesterday, Princess Mononoke

Yoshifumi Kondō (近藤 喜文, Kondō Yoshifumi; March 31, 1950 – January 21, 1998) was a Japanese animator who worked for Studio Ghibli in his last years. He was born in Gosen, Niigata Prefecture, Japan. He worked as an animation director on Anne of Green Gables, Sherlock Hound, Kiki's Delivery Service, Only Yesterday and Princess Mononoke. Kondō directed the animated film Whisper of the Heart, and was expected to become one of the top directors at Studio Ghibli, alongside Hayao Miyazaki and Isao Takahata, and to become their eventual successor.

Kondō died of aortic dissection – alternately aneurysm – in 1998.

== Life and career ==
Kondō was born in Gosen, Niigata Prefecture, Japan on March 31, 1950. He entered Niigata Prefectural Muramatsu High School in April, 1965, where he was a member of the art club. His senpai was the future manga artist Kimio Yanagisawa. In April, 1968, he moved to Tokyo after graduating from high school, where he entered Tokyo Design College's animation department. On October 1, 1968, he began working at A Production (formerly Shin'ei Dōga), participating in the production of such shows as Kyojin no Hoshi and Lupin III. Kondo moved to Nippon Animation in June 1978, participating in the production of such shows as Future Boy Conan and Anne of Green Gables.

In 1978, he co-authored a textbook for beginning animators titled Animation Book (アニメーションの本 Animēshon no Hon). He moved to Telecom Animation Film on December 16, 1980, where he worked as the character designer for Sherlock Hound. On March 16, 1985, Kondō resigned from his position at Telecom Animation Film, and was hospitalized from June through August for a type of pneumonia (自然気胸 shizen kikyō). He became a contract worker for Nippon Animation afterwards and moved to Studio Ghibli in January, 1987. In 1995, he made his directorial debut with the film Whisper of the Heart. On January 21, 1998, he died suddenly of an aortic dissection in the Tachikawa City Hospital in Tokyo at age 47.

== Filmography ==
Listed in chronological order.

=== 1960s and 1970s ===
- Star of the Giants (March 30, 1968 through September 18, 1971) (in-between animation, key animation)
- Lupin III (October 24, 1971 through March 26, 1972) (opening key animation, key animation)
- Dokonjou Gaeru (October 7, 1972 through September 28, 1974) (key animation, animation director)
- Panda! Go, Panda! (December 17, 1972) (key animation)
- Panda! Go, Panda!: The Rainy-day Circus (March 17, 1973) (key animation)
- Hajime Ningen Gyātoruzu (October 5, 1974 through March 27, 1976) (key animation)
- Ganba no Bouken (April 7, 1975 through September 29, 1975) (key animation)
- Ganso Tensai Bakabon (October 6, 1975 through September 26, 1977) (key animation)
- Manga Sekai Mukashi Banashi (October 7, 1976 through March 28, 1979) (production, character design, key animation, backgrounds)
- Sougen no Ko Tenguri (1977) (key animation)
- Ore ha Teppai (September 12, 1977 through March 27, 1978) (continuity, key animation)
- Future Boy Conan (April 4, 1978 through October 31, 1978) (key animation)
- Anne of Green Gables (January 7, 1979 through December 30, 1979) (key animation, animation director, character designer)

=== 1980s ===
- The Adventures of Tom Sawyer (January 6, 1980 through December 28, 1980) (key animation, animation director)
- Sugata Sanshirō (June 8, 1981) (key animation)
- Little Nemo: Adventures in Slumberland (worked on from 1982 through 1984, but not released until 1989) (storyboards, pilot film director, general director, pre-production)
- Sherlock Hound (November 6, 1984 through May 20, 1985) (animation director, character designer on episodes 1–13)
- The Blinkins (1985) (character designer)
- The Wuzzles (1985) (animation director, key animation)
- Ai Shōjo Pollyanna Monogatari (January 5, 1986 through December 28, 1986) (key animation)
- Ai no Wakakusa Monogatari (January 11, 1987 through December 27, 1987) (character designer, key animation)
- Grave of the Fireflies (April 16, 1988) (storyboards, character designer, animation director)
- Kiki's Delivery Service (July 29, 1989) (concept art, animation director)

=== 1990s ===
- Only Yesterday (July 20, 1991) (animation director, character designer)
- Porco Rosso (July 18, 1992) (key animation)
- Sora Iro no Tane (1992) (production, key animation)
- I Can Hear the Sea (December 25, 1993) (key animation)
- Pom Poko (July 16, 1994) (key animation)
- Whisper of the Heart (July 15, 1995) (director)
- Princess Mononoke (July 12, 1997) (animation director, character designer)

== Bibliography ==
- Animage Tokubetsu Guidebook: Omohide Poro Poro Roman Album (August 1991, 4197210809)
- Animation no Hon: Ugoku E wo Egaku Kiso Chishiki to Sakuga no Jissai (January 1978, ISBN 4-7726-0079-5)
- Animētā Kondō Yoshifumi (September 7, 2003, Niigata Nippō newspaper)
- Futo Furikaeru to (March 31, 1998, ISBN 4-19-860832-6)
- Kondō Yoshifumi no Shigoto: Dōga de Hyōgen Dekiru Koto (June 29, 2001, no ISBN, edited by Masashi Andō)
- Kondō Yoshifumi-san Tsuitō Bunshū: Kondō-san no Ita Fūkei (no ISBN, published by the Takahata · Miyazaki Sakuhin Kenkyūjo)
- Nihon no Animēshon wo Kizuita Hitobito (January 2001, ISBN 4-948755-78-8, by Seiji Kanō)
