= The Wonderful World of Puss 'n Boots =

1969 animated film directed by Kimio Yabuki

- Japanese DVD cover
- Kanji: 長靴をはいた猫
- Revised Hepburn: Nagagutsu o Haita Neko
- Directed by: Kimio Yabuki
- Screenplay by: Hisashi Inoue; Morihisa Yamamoto
- Based on: Puss in Boots by Charles Perrault
- Produced by: Hiroshi Ōkawa
- Starring: Susumu Ishikawa; Toshiko Fujita; Rumi Sakakibara; Ado Mizumori; Yōko Mizugaki; Kazuo Kumakura; Kenji Utsumi; Shun Yashiro; Kinya Aikawa; Asao Koike; Kiiton Masuda
- Cinematography: Sanki Hirao; Yōichi Takanashi
- Edited by: Yutaka Chikura
- Music by: Seiichirō Uno
- Production company: Toei Animation
- Distributed by: Toei Company
- Release date: March 18, 1969
- Running time: 82 minutes
- Country: Japan
- Language: Japanese

The Wonderful World of Puss 'n Boots (Note: Japanese: 長靴をはいた猫, Hepburn: Nagagutsu o Haita Neko; lit. 'Cat Who Wore Boots') is a 1969 Japanese animated musical action comedy film produced by Toei Animation and directed by Kimio Yabuki. The screenplay and lyrics, written by Hisashi Inoue and Morihisa Yamamoto, are based on the European fairy tale character Puss in Boots by Charles Perrault, expanded with elements of Alexandre Dumas-esque swashbuckling adventure and cartoon animal slapstick, with many other anthropomorphic animals in addition to the title character. The Toei version of the character himself is named Pero, after Perrault.

The Wonderful World of Puss 'n Boots was released in Japan on March 18, 1969. The film is particularly notable for giving Toei Animation its mascot and logo, and for its roll call of top key animators of the time: Yasuo Ōtsuka, Reiko Okuyama, Sadao Kikuchi, Yōichi Kotabe, Akemi Ōta, Hayao Miyazaki, and Akira Daikubara, supervised by animation director Yasuji Mori. They got relatively free rein and adequate support to create virtuosic and distinctive sequences, making it a key example of the Japanese model of division of labour in animation by which animators are assigned by scene rather than character. Most famous of these sequences is a chase across castle parapets animated in alternating cuts by Ōtsuka and Miyazaki, which would serve as the model for similar sequences in such later films as Miyazaki's feature directorial debut Lupin III: The Castle of Cagliostro and The Cat Returns (2002). Miyazaki is also the manga artist of a promotional manga adaptation of the film originally serialised in the Sunday Chunichi Shimbun during 1969 and republished in 1984 in a book about the making of the film. The film was re-released 9 years later in the 1978 Toei Manga Festival on July 22. It was released straight to television in the United States by American International Television in 1971.

Since becoming Toei Animation's mascot, Pero's face can be seen on the company's primary logo at the beginning or ending to some of Toei's other animated features, both from Japan and some of their outsourced work for other companies. In 2016, a new 3D on-screen logo featuring Pero was revealed in celebration of the company's 60th anniversary. The 3D on-screen logo without the 60th anniversary wordmark and the company's motto was used since 2019. The former on-screen logo is currently used as a print logo.

== Plot ==
The enigmatic Puss, Pero, is declared an outlaw by his feline home village for saving mice, an act that defies the nature of cats and is therefore illegal. After Pero escapes to avoid punishment, the Feline King dispatches three bumbling assassins to find and capture Pero, warning them that they face execution should they fail. Pero begins his journey while dodging his would-be captors throughout the adventure. He later meets young Pierre, a poor, neglected miller's son who is ousted from his home. The two quickly become good friends and set off together across the countryside.

The duo eventually arrive at a bustling kingdom where a ceremony has begun in which a suitable prince will wed the lonely, innocent Princess Rosa. Pero sees potential in Pierre as the perfect candidate and hurries into the castle to begin his plan, much to Pierre's opposition. Misfortune soon enshrouds the kingdom as Lucifer, an ogre sorcerer, appears displaying his awesome magical abilities with promises of power and riches if Rosa becomes his bride. Despite the King's excited willingness, Rosa sternly declines Lucifer's offer, which enrages Lucifer with disappointment. He threatens the King with a terrifying demonstration of the darkness that will befall his country if Rosa is not surrendered to him in three days time. Pero, now dumbfounded, witnesses this shocking event and what was once a simple mission of persuasion has now become more than he ever bargained for.

== Voice cast ==
Character	Japanese	English
Pero	Susumu Ishikawa	Gilbert Mack
Pierre	Toshiko Fujita	Jack Grimes
Princess Rosa	Rumi Sakakibara	Corinne Orr
Assassin	Ado Mizumori	Unknown
Little Mouse	Yōko Mizugaki	Unknown
Boss Mouse	Kazuo Kumakura	Unknown
Daniel	Kenji Utsumi	Ray Owens
Raymond	Shun Yashiro	Unknown
Assassin Boss	Kinya Aikawa	Unknown
Lucifer	Asao Koike	Ray Owens
King	Kiiton Masuda	Gilbert Mack

== Release ==
The film was released in Japan theatrically on March 18, 1969.

The AIP English dub version was released on VHS at least thrice, first by Media Home Entertainment in 1982 (under licensed from then-owner Orion Pictures) and by Vestron Video in 1985, then by Hi-Tops Video in 1988. In 2006, Discotek Media released a DVD version of the film containing the original Japanese version with English subtitles, the AIP English dub, and a music and effects track in Region 1 NTSC format in the United States, under the title The Wonderful World of Puss 'n Boots. Toei released the film on Blu-ray in Japan on December 2, 2020.

== Reception ==
The Wonderful World of Puss 'n Boots placed 58th in a list of the 150 best animated films and series of all time compiled by Tokyo's Laputa Animation Festival from an international survey of animation staff and critics in 2003.

A 1998 re-release of the film earned a distribution income of ¥200 million ($1.26 million) at the Japanese box office.

== Legacy ==
=== Manga ===
Miyazaki created a 12-chapter manga series as a promotional tie-in. The series was printed in colour and ran in the Sunday edition of Tokyo Shimbun, from January to March 1969. The series was released in pocket book form by Tokuma Shoten in February 1984.

=== Sequels ===
Two sequels followed. The collective series is known as Nagagutsu Neko Shirīzu (長靴猫シリーズ; "Puss in Boots Series").

The second installment, a short film released in 1972, Nagagutsu Sanjūshi (ながぐつ三銃士; "Cavalier-Booted Three Musketeers" or "The Three Musketeers in Boots"), departs from the first film's Dumasian Europe setting for a Western environment. Titled Ringo Goes West or Ringo Rides West in non-Japanese territories, with Pero renamed Ringo, it was released on VHS in the early 1980s by MPI Home Video in the United States, and by Mountain Video in the United Kingdom. It is also marketed as Return of Pero and popularly known today as The Three Musketeers in Boots, despite featuring no musketeers, as the setting is the American Old West.

Voice cast

Character	Original	English
Pero	Yasushi Suzuki	Ron Lea as Ringo
Jimmy	Kiyoshi Komiyama	Unknown
Annie	Kurumi Kobato	Jane Woods
Killer A	Shun Yashiro	Unknown
Killer B	Isamu Tanonaka	Unknown
Killer C	Ado Mizumori	Unknown
Boss	Ushio Shima	Unknown
One-eye	Hidekatsu Shibata	Unknown
Big	Hiroshi Masuoka	Unknown
Fat	Eken Mine	Unknown
Tiny	Setsuo Wakui	Unknown
Mouse Leader	Kōsei Tomita	Unknown
Little Mouse	Sachiko Chijimatsu	Unknown
Jane	Kazue Takahashi	Unknown
Mayor	Shoji Aoki	Unknown
Coachman	Koji Yada	Unknown

Neil Shee, Steven Chaikelson, Dean Hagopin, Arthur Grosser, Mark Walker and Terence Labrosse provide additional voices.

The third entry, released in 1976, Puss 'n Boots Travels Around the World (長靴をはいた猫 80日間世界一周, Nagagutsu o Haita Neko: Hachijū Nichi-kan Sekaiisshū; "Puss 'n Boots: Around the World in 80 Days") was licensed by Turner Program Services. In the dub, directed by Peter Fernandez, Pero is renamed Pussty. The dub was released on video in the US by RCA/Columbia Pictures Home Video. The character of Dr. Garigari had actually appeared a decade before in 1965 as the antagonist to Toei's animated TV series Hustle Punch and was recycled for use in this film.

The film was a major success in the Soviet Union, drawing 42.4 million admissions at the Soviet box office. This was equivalent to approximately 10.6 million Rbls ($14.2 million).

Voice cast

Character	Original	English
Pero	Osami Nabe	Lionel Wilson as Pussty
Grummon	Junpei Takiguchi	Unknown
Dr. Garigari	Chikao Ohtsuka	Unknown
Father Mouse	Kōsei Tomita	Unknown
Cat King	Kōsei Tomita	Unknown
Suzanna	Eiko Masuyama	Unknown
Carter	Takuzô Kamiyama	Unknown
Mayor	Jōji Yanami	Unknown
Newspaper President	Osamu Katō	Unknown
Restaurant Manager	Shunji Yamada	Unknown
Small Mouse	Keiko Yamamoto	Unknown
Eskimo Child	Sachiko Chijimatsu	Unknown
Killer A	Sanji Hase	Unknown
Killer C	Ado Mizumori	Unknown
Killer B	Isamu Tanonaka	Unknown

=== Video game ===
A video game, Nagagutsu o Haita Neko: Sekai Isshū 80 Nichi Dai Bōken, based on the third film, was released, in a heavily revised version, in the United States under the title Puss 'n Boots: Pero's Great Adventure, where it is better known than the film itself. The game was released for the Famicom in Japan and was later released outside of Japan for the Nintendo Entertainment System. The game and its plot were used as a plot in an episode of Captain N: The Game Master, entitled "Once Upon A Time Machine", which have re-designs of Pero and the two villains of the film, Count Gourmon (Gruemon in the game's instruction manual) and Dr. Garigari.

=== Short film ===
In 2018, Toei produced a six-minute short film, entitled Dream, about a young boy who dreams about whales. Pero makes an appearance, but to match the short's animation style, Pero has small black eyes.
