= Susumu Ishikawa =

Japanese voice actor (1933–2012)

- 石川 進
- Born: July 13, 1933; Ashikaga, Tochigi, Japan
- Died: October 29, 2012 (aged 79)
- Occupations: Anison and voice actor

Susumu Ishikawa (石川 進, Ishikawa Susumu; July 13, 1933 – October 29, 2012) was a Japanese anison and voice actor who had performed many anime openings, including 1964 hit theme song from Obake no Q-Tarō and the theme from the 1972 anime series Dokonjō Gaeru. He performed songs in Godzilla vs. Gigan, and was the voice of the main character called Pero in the anime film Puss In Boots.

Ishikawa won the 1966 Japan Record Award in the Children's Song category. In 1968, he won an award at the Moscow Film Awards.

== Filmography ==
- The Wonderful World of Puss 'n Boots (1969), Pero
