= Frames of Anime =

2010 reference work by Tze-yue G. Hu

Frames of Anime: Culture and Image-Building
- Author: Tze-yue G. Hu
- Genre: Reference
- Publisher: Hong Kong University Press
- Publication date: 2010
- Pages: xiii, 228
- ISBN: 978-962-209-097-2
- OCLC: 707091264
- Text: Frames of Anime: Culture and Image-Building at the Internet Archive

Frames of Anime: Culture and Image-Building is a 2010 reference work by the cultural scholar Tze-yue G. Hu.

== Contents ==
Frames of Anime explores the development of modern anime through its connections with traditional Japanese art forms and the cultural impact of World War II in the country. The work is structured in approximate chronological order, beginning with two chapters discussing the historical styles from which anime was derived. Later chapters cover the development of the anime industry during and after World War II, including an exploration of how Princess Iron Fan (1941), a popular Chinese film, impacted Japanese animators. The sixth chapter examines the filmographies of Hayao Miyazaki and Isao Takahata, discussing their impact on the medium and their statuses as auteurs. The book concludes with a chapter on the uniqueness of Japan's animation industry in Asia and why other countries have not developed comparable counterparts.

== Reception ==
In her review for The Journal of Japanese Studies, the animation scholar Susan J. Napier appreciated the creation of a work analyzing anime within its historical and cultural contexts. She also favored the non-Western perspective which Hu, a Hong Kong scholar, writes from. The scholar Kinnia Shuk-ting Yau applauded the inclusion of details from interviews Hu had conducted with industry professionals. Napier felt the work features a "rather vague overall structure", and identified several broad statements which she felt risked "essentializing Japanese culture." She also wrote that Hu makes a number of claims which lack supporting evidence, such as her descriptions of Studio Ghibli's "die-hard neo samurai mentality" in its competition with Western animation. Yau also found the focus placed on the works of Miyazaki and Takahata to be disproportionate compared to other genres of anime.
