= The Great Adventure of Horus, Prince of the Sun =

- Theatrical release poster
- Directed by: Isao Takahata
- Written by: Kazuo Fukazawa
- Produced by: Hiroshi Okawa
- Starring: Hisako Okata
- Cinematography: Jiro Yoshimura
- Edited by: Yutaka Chikura
- Music by: Michio Mamiya
- Production company: Toei Dōga
- Distributed by: Toei Company
- Release date: July 21, 1968
- Running time: 82 minutes
- Country: Japan
- Language: Japanese
- Budget: ¥140 million

The Great Adventure of Horus, Prince of the Sun (Japanese: 太陽の王子 ホルスの大冒険, Hepburn: Taiyō no Ōji Horusu no Daibōken) is a 1968 Japanese anime fantasy adventure film. It is the directorial feature film debut of Isao Takahata with key animation and scene design from Hayao Miyazaki. Horus marked the beginning of their partnership that would last for the next 50 years across numerous animation studios.

The core production team for Horus, Prince of the Sun included Takahata (Director), Yasuo Otsuka (Animation Director), Hayao Miyazaki (Scene Design, Key Animation), Yasuji Mori (Key Animation), Reiko Okuyama (Key Animation), and Yoichi Kotabe (Key Animation). This group contributed to designs, story ideas and storyboards; all but Takahata (who is not an animator) contributed to character designs. Akemi Ota, Masatake Kita, and Sadao Kikuchi were the remaining Key Animators, but did not contribute many ideas to the film.

In 1971, the movie was released straight to television in the United States by American International Television under the title Little Norse Prince.

== Synopsis ==
Set in an unspecified northern kingdom in ancient Norway, the film opens with the young Horus (aka Hols,) attempting to fight off a pack of "silver wolves," and accidentally waking up an ancient stone giant, named Mogue (or Rockoar in some editions of the film). Horus succeeds in pulling a splinter from the giant's shoulder, which transpires to be a rusty and ancient sword. The giant proclaims this to be the "Sword of the Sun," promising also that when the sword has been reforged, he will come to Horus, who will then be called "Prince of the Sun".

Horus' father, on his deathbed, reveals that their family came from a northern seaside village, which was devastated by the terrifying ice devil Grunwald, leaving them the only survivors. Before dying, Horus' father urges his son to return to the land of his birth and avenge the village.

On his journey, Horus and his companion, a bear named Koro, are soon confronted by Grunwald, who plunges the boy from a cliff when Horus refuses to serve him. Horus survives the fall and is rescued by the inhabitants of a nearby village. Horus soon becomes a heroic figure when he kills an enormous pike which had been threatening the lives and livelihoods of this fishing community.

The pike was a ploy of Grunwald's, who then sends the silver wolves to attack the village instead. In the battle that follows, Horus and Koro chase the wolves to a deserted village, where he meets a mysterious young girl named Hilda. Horus takes Hilda back to his village, where her beautiful singing is welcomed by the villagers, with the exception of the chief, who is increasingly resentful of Horus' popularity, and his deputy, Drago. Hilda, who is actually Grunwald's sister and under his evil influence, later collaborates with Drago and sends a swarm of rats to attack the village (in the original Japanese version, Grunwald wanted Horus to be his brother before he plunged Horus down the cliff; this ties in with Horus' first encounter with Hilda and her comment on how they both share the same fate that they're like twins). Drago frames Horus for his own failed attempt to assassinate the chief, and the villagers banish Horus.

Horus sets out in search of Grunwald, but is confronted by Hilda, and the owl who acts as a messenger between Hilda and Grunwald. With her true identity revealed, Hilda reluctantly attacks Horus, who falls into a chasm and becomes trapped in an enchanted wood, where he is haunted by visions of the villagers and his father. Grunwald then sends Hilda, against her wishes, to kill Horus, and makes his own attack on the village, together with his wolves and a giant ice mammoth.

Horus is able to escape from the enchanted forest when he realizes that the sword must be reforged as a collective effort and that the villagers must unite in order to defeat Grunwald. After a brief fight with Hilda, who is thoroughly remorseful about her involvement in Grunwald's plan, Horus rejoins the villagers in their battle and uses the raging fires they ignited in their defense to reforge the sword. With the "Sword of the Sun" reforged, he is soon joined by the stone giant Mogue. Together they defeat and destroy Grunwald. Hilda, who had given her magical "Medal of Life" to aid Horus, finds that she is still alive without it, and rejoins Horus and the villagers.

== Voice cast ==
Character	Original	English
Grunwald	Mikijiro Hira	Gilbert Mack
Hilda	Etsuko Ichihara	Corinne Orr
Ganko	Eijirou Touno	Gilbert Mack
Village Chief	Masao Mishima	Ray Owens
Drago	Yasushi Nagata	Gilbert Mack
Hols	Hisako Okata	Billie Lou Watt
Hols' Father	Hisashi Yokomori	Gilbert Mack
Toto the White Owl	Hisashi Yokomori	Ray Owens
Chaharu	Tokuko Sugiyama	Corinne Orr
Boldo	Tadashi Yokouchi	Unknown
Moug the Rock Giant/Rockor	Tadashi Yokouchi	Ray Owens
Mauni	Yoko Mizugaki	Corinne Orr
Chiro the Squirrel	Noriko Ohara	Corinne Orr
Koro the Bear Cub	Yukari Asai	Corinne Orr
Freppu/Flip	Junko Hori	Corinne Orr
Potomu/Potom	Junko Hori	Corinne Orr

== Production ==
The story of Horus is based on the puppet play The Sun Above Chikisani (チキサニの太陽, Chikisani no Taiyō), created by screenwriter Kazuo Fukazawa, which in turn is a reinterpretation of an epic from Yukar, the oral tradition of the Ainu people, the indigenous people of the island of Hokkaido. The Japanese language title of the originally Ainu epic is オキクルミと悪魔の子 (Okikurumi to akuma no ko). For Horus the setting was changed to Scandinavia to avoid any controversy due to depiction of the Ainu people. The story was also inspired by the intention to address an adult audience, to reflect societal changes in contemporary Japan and to portray the socialist ideals in the portrayed village community, where the protagonists not only improve their own lot in a coming of age story but where their personal growth benefits society at large as well. The film shows a place where the people are able to shake off oppressive forces and derive pleasure from their communal efforts such as subsistence fishing.

Production on Horus started in autumn 1965 and lasted until March 1968. The production was lengthy compared to other feature-length animated films at Toei, which were made in approximately 8–10 months. The focus at the company was also shifting towards production of television animation. Director Takahata and animation director Ōtsuka approached the process in an egalitarian manner and invited input from the entire team for storyboard and planning meetings, a method which opened the door for Miyazaki to contribute significantly to the development of the story and animation.

With a production budget of over ¥100 million or $278,000 (equivalent to $2,600,000 in 2025), Horus was the most expensive anime film up until it was surpassed by Space Battleship Yamato (1977).

== Reception ==
As quoted in The Encyclopedia of Japanese Pop Culture by Mark Schilling, a reviewer for Hakubunkan's monthly magazine Taiyō (太陽; lit. Sun) commented, in 1968, "In one corner of the world there now exists a commercial animation that has surpassed Disney and started to make rapid advances", after seeing Horus and The Jungle Book.

Helen McCarthy, in her book Hayao Miyazaki; Master of Japanese Animation, notes that the film had only a brief theatrical release despite its critical and popular success. McCarthy notes that Yasuji Mori's "clean and simple character design" for Hilda "allowed for considerable emotional depth and flexibility" and she observed that this style remained a powerful influence on the works of Takahata and Miyazaki throughout their animation careers.

In 2001, the Japanese magazine Animage elected Horus, Prince of the Sun the third best anime production of all time.

In his book Anime Explosion, Patrick Drazen mentions the film as a pivotal work in the evolution of animation and writes that the 10-day theatrical showing was either a sign that Toei studio executives were unable to recognise quality or a ploy to get back at Union organizers like Miyazaki and Takahata, who didn't direct for the company again. Drazen notes that the ending scenes in the film were thinly disguised rallying cries for the union and student movements of the time, by whom the film was well received. Drazen also praised the depiction of Hilda as a conflicted heroine, writing that the character comes across as complex, working sometimes for good and sometimes for evil, and can be seen as the first in a long line of multidimensional heroines in Takahata's and Miyazaki's later works.

The influence on Japanese cel animation of Ōtsuka's approach for Horus has been singled out. Thomas Lamarre writes, in The Anime Machine, that understanding Yasuo Ōtsuka's style is especially important for an understanding of Hayao Miyazaki's work. The sequence in which Horus fights the giant fish in particular has been referenced as a pivotal moment in the evolution of the medium and as a scene which had a profound impact on the animation works later produced at Studio Ghibli.

Justin Sevakis, writing a retrospective review for Anime News Network in March 2014, noted that the film was a financial flop but almost immediately gained a following among young people. Sevakis opined that despite its flaws, Horus is one of the few animated stories from the period that can still be recommended to an adult audience.

In 2017, Mike Toole of Anime News Network placed the film first on his 100 Best Anime Movies of All Time list.
