= Teikyo University Hospital =

Coordinates: 35.759167°N 139.714722°E

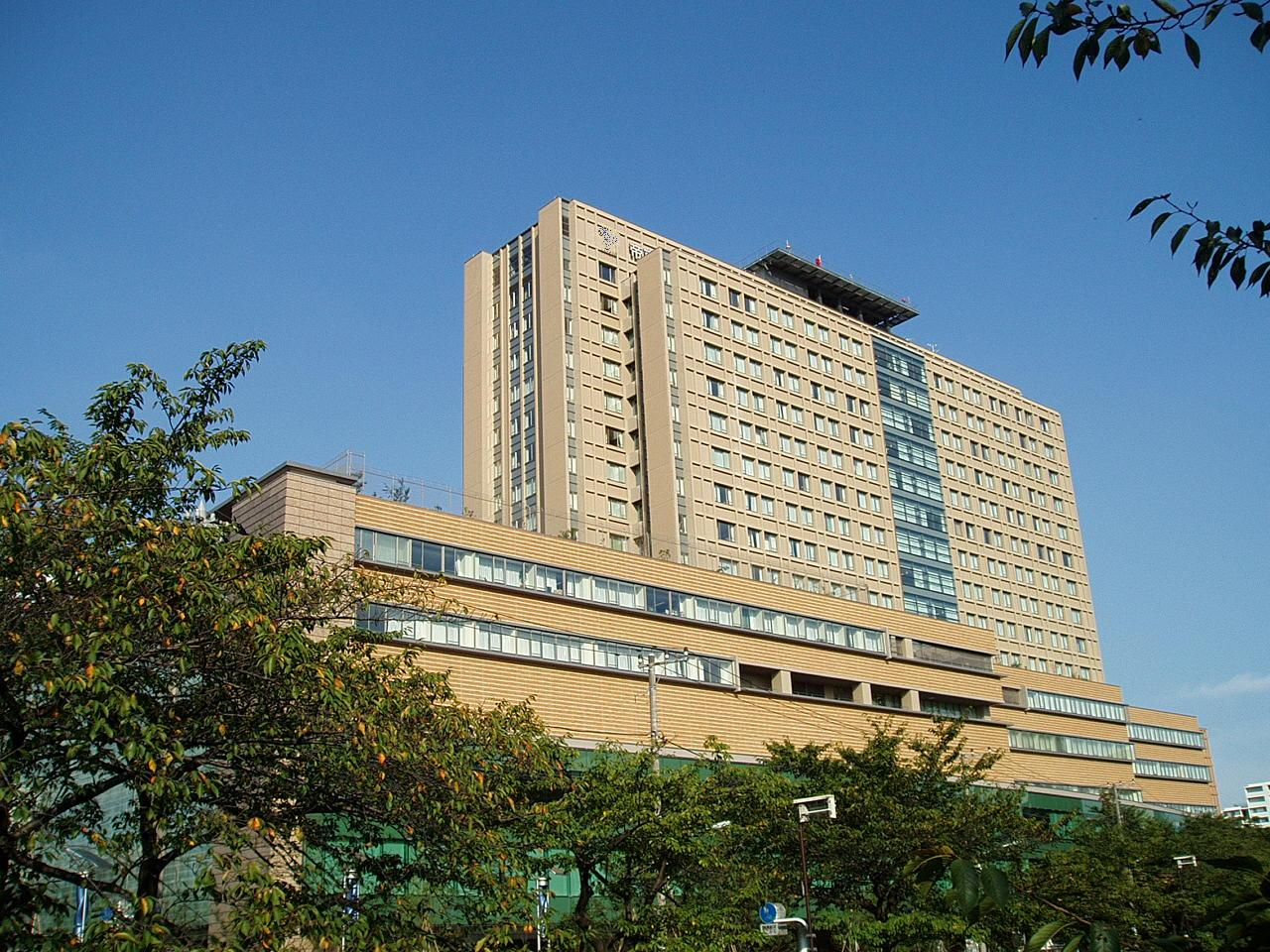
- Teikyo University Hospital

Geography
- Location: Itabashi, Tokyo, Tokyo, JP

Organisation
- Care system: Private
- Type: Teaching
- Affiliated university: Teikyo University

Services
- Standards: Special function hospital
- Emergency department: Yes
- Beds: 1,014

History
- Founded: 1971

Links
- Website: www.teikyo-hospital.jp

The Teikyo University Hospital is a private teaching hospital operated by Teikyo University.

The hospital is located within Teikyo University's Itabashi Campus in Itabashi, Tokyo. Located at 2-11-1 Kaga, Itabashi-ku, Tokyo, near Jūjō Station and Itabashihoncho Station. Opened on 1 September 1971. It comprises 1,014 beds, including 975 general beds and 39 psychiatric beds, and its main building has 19 above-ground floors and two basement floors.

The hospital provides high-level medical care.

Emergency and acute-phase services are provided at Teikyo University Hospital. The hospital includes the Trauma and Resuscitation Center, the ER Center, the Trauma Center, the Cardiovascular Center, and the Maternal, Fetal, and Neonatal Center.

== Clinical services ==
Teikyo University Hospital provides inpatient, outpatient, and specialist services, and supporting medical education and research.

It provide emergency and acute-phase medical care, cancer treatment. Its cancer treatment includes a Cancer Chemotherapy Center, and the Cancer Information and Support Center.

Adjacent to the hospital is Teikyo University's Itabashi Campus. The campus is home to the university's School of Medicine, Faculty of Pharma-Science, Faculty of Medical Technology, and related graduate schools.

== See also ==
- Healthcare in Japan
- Lists of hospitals
- List of hospitals in Japan
- Teikyo University
