= 3000 Leagues in Search of Mother =

1976 Japanese animated TV series

- Cover of the first DVD volume by Bandai.
- 母をたずねて三千里; Haha o Tazunete Sanzenri
- Genre: Adventure, drama, historical
- Based on: Heart by Edmondo De Amicis
- Screenplay by: Kazuo Fukazawa
- Directed by: Isao Takahata
- Music by: Kōichi Sakata
- Country of origin: Japan
- Original language: Japanese
- No. of episodes: 52 (list of episodes)

Production
- Executive producer: Kōichi Motohashi
- Producers: Junzo Nakajima; Takaji Matsudo
- Production companies: Nippon Animation; Fuji Television

Original release
- Network: FNS (Fuji TV)
- Release: 4 January – 26 December 1976

Related
- Anime film
- Directed by: Isao Takahata; Hajime Okayasu
- Studio: Nippon Animation
- Released: 19 July 1980
- Runtime: 107 minutes
- Anime film

Marco: 3000 Leagues in Search of Mother
- Directed by: Kozo Kuzuha
- Written by: Kazuo Fukuzawa
- Music by: Taro Iwashiro
- Studio: Nippon Animation
- Released: 2 April 1999
- Runtime: 98 minutes

3000 Leagues in Search of Mother (母をたずねて三千里, Haha o Tazunete Sanzenri) is a Japanese animated television series directed by Isao Takahata that aired in 1976. It is loosely based on a small part of the Italian novel Heart (Cuore) created by Edmondo De Amicis, i.e., a monthly tale (racconto mensile) From the Apennines to the Andes (Dagli Appennini alle Ande), widely expanded into a 52-episode epic.

The series was broadcast on World Masterpiece Theater (known at the time as Calpis Children's Theater), an animation staple that showcased each year an animated version of a different classic book or story. It was originally titled From the Apennines to the Andes. Nippon Animation, producers of World Masterpiece Theater, adapted Cuore into a second anime television series in 1981, Ai no Gakko Cuore Monogatari, although this second series was not part of the WMT.

The series was dubbed into several languages and became an instant success in some countries, such as Portugal, Brazil, Peru, Spain, Venezuela, Colombia, Germany, Chile, the Philippines, Malaysia, Turkey, Iran and the Arab world. In some European countries and in Latin America, the series is simply known as Marco. In the Arab world, the series was a huge success; it was called Wada'an Marco (وداعاً ماركو), meaning Goodbye Marco.

== Plot ==
The plot of the series focuses on Marco, a boy who lives with his family in the harbor city of Genoa, Italy during a depression period in 1881. Marco's father, Pietro Rossi, is a manager of a hospital who dedicates his time to treating poor patients, and therefore the family has financial difficulties. His beloved mother, Anna Rossi, goes to Argentina to work as a maid to earn money for Marco. When the letters from his mother stop coming after an indication that she is sick, Marco fears the worst for her fate. Since his father is too busy working in his clinic and his older brother Tonio was sent to train as a locomotive driver in Milan, he is the only one free to go search for her.

Marco takes his older brother's pet monkey Amedio and they sneak aboard the Andrea Doria, a ship bound for Brazil. In Brazil, Marco boards an immigrant ship and arrives in Buenos Aires, where he meets a puppeteer called Peppino and his family, whom he knew from Genoa. They accompany him to Bahía Blanca to try to locate his mother.

In Bahía Blanca, he discovers his uncle stole the letters which his mother had sent him. He returns to Buenos Aires and sails off on a ship to Rosario; there he tries to figure out how to get on a train to Córdoba. Marco's Italian friends collect money and buy him a train ticket. Marco arrives in Córdoba, and successfully finds the agricultural engineer Mister Mequinez. He tells Marco that his mother works for his brother in Tucumán and gives him enough money for a train ticket. But Marco ends up giving the money to a doctor to save the life of a poor girl he meets. Marco sneaks on the train, but he gets caught and tossed off in the middle of nowhere. A group of traveling Roma rescue him and give him an old donkey.

After a few days, the donkey dies and Marco continues to walk to Tucumán. He eventually arrives to his destination hungry and tired, and finds his mother. His mother is very sick and needs an operation, but she is too weak. As soon as she sees Marco, she regains her strength and manages to go through the surgery successfully.

At the end of the series, Marco and his mother return to Genoa, where the family is reunited.

== Characters ==
- Marco Rossi – a 9-year-old boy in search of his mother.
- Amedio – Marco's pet monkey, originally belonging to his brother Tonio.
- Anna Rossi – Marco's mother, who works in Argentina to support the family.
- Antonio (Tonio) Rossi – Marco's older brother, who attends an engineer school.
- Pietro Rossi – Marco's father, manager of a charity hospital in Genoa.
- Francisco Meritz – A family friend, entrusted with sending Anna's money back to Italy.
- Peppino – the head of the travelling Peppino Troupe, a variety show starring his daughters.
- Concetta – Peppino's eldest daughter; she specialises in dance and song within the troupe.
- Fiorina – Peppino's second daughter and Marco's close friend; she specialises in puppetry within the troupe.
- Giulietta – Fiorina's baby sister.
- Rocky – a Brazilian sailor who befriends Marco on his journey across the Atlantic.
- Pablo Garcia – Marco's friend in Argentina, a boy with Native American ancestry living in a slum who's thought to be a Mestizo.
- Juana Garcia – Pablo's younger sister.

== Production ==
It was directed by Isao Takahata, with Hayao Miyazaki supervising the series layout and Yōichi Kotabe—already known for his work on Heidi—in charge of character design. Art direction was handled by Takamura Mukuo, while the screenplay was written by newcomer Kazuo Fuzakawa, who expanded the original short story with numerous adventures and new characters, such as Fiorina and her family of puppeteers. As with Heidi, the production team conducted on-site research for the series, this time traveling to Genoa and Argentina.

== Related media ==
A condensed film was released in the 1980s using edited footage from the TV run. Nippon Animation also re-animated 3000 Leagues as a feature-length film in 1999, with a theme song performed by Scottish pop superstar Sheena Easton ("Carry a Dream", which was included in her 1999 album called Home that was only released in Japan).

=== Film ===
- 3000 Leagues in Search of Mother (母をたずねて三千里, Haha o Tazunete Sanzenri) is the film edited by the staff of the anime television series. The theatrical release date was July 19, 1980. It was distributed by Toho Towa and screened at Toho Yoga group theater. The running time is 107 minutes.
- Marco: 3000 Leagues in Search of Mother (Marco 母をたずねて三千里, Maruko Haha o Tazunete Sanzenri) is the remake film based on the TV animation series which Nippon Animation produced and released on April 2, 1999. Unlike the previous film, the original staff did not participate in the direction and the script applied to the source material. Moreover, under the influence of group negotiations to demand improvement of the voice actors, the original cast did not participate.

== Reception ==
The series was ranked 81st in a Top 100 Anime list by TV Asahi in September 2005. It was also ranked 20th in a TV Asahi list of the favorite television anime of 100 celebrities in 2006.
