= Yōichi Kotabe =

Japanese animator and character designer

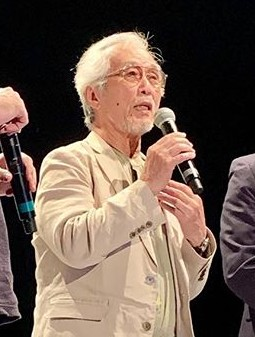
- Kotabe in 2019
- Born: September 15, 1936 (age 89)
- Education: Tokyo University of the Arts
- Occupations: Animator, character designer
- Years active: 1959–present
- Spouse: Reiko Okuyama (m. 1963; died 2007)

Yōichi Kotabe (小田部 羊一, Kotabe Yōichi; born September 15, 1936) is a Japanese animator and character designer, best known for his work on classic anime of the 1960s and 1970s, the Super Mario video game series, and the Pokémon franchise in television and film. He was an employee at Nintendo for two decades doing illustrations, character designs, and supervision from 1985 to 2007. After that, he began to work as a freelancer for the anime and video game industry, including for Nintendo again.

== Biography ==
Kotabe became interested in animation after watching the short film Momotarō no Umiwashi as a child. He was fascinated with how the fighter moved in the film. His father, who was an oil painter, also influenced his decision to work as an artist. Kotabe found oil painting to be difficult, so he instead worked in watercolor painting.

In order to continue working with watercolors, he adopted the nihonga, or Japanese-style, of painting, and began studying at the Tokyo University of the Arts in the Japanese-style painting department. While attending, he was impressed by the film The Tale of the White Serpent and the animator Yasuji Mori, and immediately applied to work at Toei Animation.

His first project there was The Great Adventure of Horus, Prince of the Sun where he met Hayao Miyazaki and Isao Takahata. He left Toei amid a labor dispute along with Miyazaki and Takahata in order to work at A Pro, where they began work on an adaptation of Pippi Longstocking. The project was eventually canceled, and work began on the two-film series Panda! Go, Panda!.

Kotabe then worked as character designer on two anime television series from Nippon Animation: Heidi, Girl of the Alps, and 3000 Leagues in Search of Mother, with Miyazaki working on scene design and layout and Takahata working as series director and storyboard artist.

In 1985, he was scouted by Nintendo and assumed the position of game development advisor, where he created package illustrations for Super Mario Bros., which was his introduction to video games. He continued working as a character designer and illustrator on the Super Mario series, contributing to the design of Yoshi by drawing inspiration from a chameleon sticking out its tongue, which was adapted into Yoshi's character. He would also work on games in The Legend of Zelda and Pokémon franchises. His work on the Kuru Kuru Kururin series was his last role as a character designer at Nintendo. He left the company in 2007, although he had originally only intended to stay at the company for one or two years at most.

== Works ==
=== Film and television ===
Year	Title	Crew role	Notes	Source
1959	Magic Boy	Animator		
1960	Alakazam the Great	Animator		
1962	Sinbad no Boken (ja:アラビアンナイト・シンドバッドの冒険 (映画), Adventures of Sinbad)	Animator		
1963–65	Okami-shōnen Ken (ja:狼少年ケン, Ken the wolf boy)	Animation director (mid-term)		
1963	Doggie March	Key animation		
1964–65	Shōnen Ninja Kaze no Fujimaru	Animation director, key animation	Also film	
1965–66	Hustle Punch (ja:ハッスルパンチ, Hassuru panchi)	Animation director, key animation		
1966–67	Rainbow Sentai Robin (ja:レインボー戦隊ロビン, Reinbō sentai robin)	Animation director		
1966–68	Sally the Witch	Animation director		
1968	The Great Adventure of Horus, Prince of the Sun	Key animation		
1969	Puss 'n Boots	Key animation		
1969	Flying Phantom Ship	Animation director		
1971	Ali Baba and the Forty Thieves	Key animation		
1972–73	Akado Suzunosuke	Animation supervisor assistant		
1972	Panda! Go, Panda!	Animation director		
1973	Panda! Go, Panda!: The Rainy-Day Circus	Animation director		
1974	Heidi, Girl of the Alps	Character design, animation director	Also related films	
1976	3000 Leagues in Search of Mother	Character design, animation director, animation		
1977	Rascal the Raccoon	Animation		
1979	Tatsu no ko Taro	Character design, animation director		
1981–83	Jarinko Chie	Animation director, Character design	film and TV series	
1983	Serendipity the Pink Dragon	Anime character design		
1983–85	Kojika Monogatari (子鹿物語, The Yearling)	Key animation		
1983	Nausicaä of the Valley of the Wind	Key animation		
1984–85	Adventures of the Little Koala	Animation director		
1985–86	Bumpety Boo	Animation director		
1986	Sango-sho Densetsu: Aoi Umi no Erufii	Character design	TV special film	
1998	Pokémon: The First Movie	Animation supervisor	Also Pikachu's Vacation short	
1999	Marco: 3000 Leagues in Search of Mother	Original character		
2000	Pokémon 3: The Movie	Animation supervisor		
2001	Kirby: Right Back at Ya!	Animation supervisor		
2012–13	Pocket Monsters: Best Wishes! Season 2	Animation supervisor		
2013–16	Pokémon XY	Animation supervisor		
2014	Pokémon the Movie: Diancie and the Cocoon of Destruction	Animation supervisor	Also Pikachu short	
2015	Pokémon the Movie: Hoopa and the Clash of Ages	Animation supervisor		
2016	Pokémon the Movie: Volcanion and the Mechanical Marvel	Animation supervisor		

=== Video games ===
Year	Title	Role	Source
1986	Super Mario Bros. 2	Illustrator	
1988	Super Mario Bros. 3	Illustrator	
1990	Super Mario World	Illustrator	
1991	The Legend of Zelda: A Link to the Past	Designer	
1992	Super Mario Kart	Illustrator	
1993	The Legend of Zelda: Link's Awakening	Designer	
1996	Super Mario 64	Character design	
1996	Super Mario RPG: Legend of the Seven Stars	Character advisor	
1998	Pocket Monsters Stadium	Character supervisor	
1998	Mario Party	Character supervisor	
1999	Super Smash Bros.	Character supervisor	
1999	Pokémon Snap	Character supervisor	
1999	Pokémon Stadium	Character supervisor	
1999	Mario Golf	Character supervisor	
2000	Mario Tennis	Character supervisor	
2000	Pokémon Stadium 2	Character supervisor	
2001	Kuru Kuru Kururin	Character design	
2002	Kururin Paradise	Character design	
2004	Kururin Squash!	Character design	

== Awards and nominations ==
- Animator/Animation Director award, Tokyo Anime Fair 6th Annual Awards of Merit, 2009.
- Special Achievement award, 19th Japan Media Arts Festival Awards, 2015.
