= Modest Heroes =

Modest Heroes – Ponoc Short Films Theatre, Volume 1
- Theatrical release poster
- Kanji: ちいさな英雄－カニとタマゴと透明人間－
- Revised Hepburn: Chīsana Eiyū: Kani to Tamago to Tōmei Ningen
- Directed by: Hiromasa Yonebayashi; Yoshiyuki Momose; Akihiko Yamashita
- Written by: Hiromasa Yonebayashi; Yoshiyuki Momose; Akihiko Yamashita
- Produced by: Yoshiaki Nishimura
- Music by: Takatsugu Muramatsu; Masanori Shimada; Yasutaka Nakata
- Production company: Studio Ponoc
- Distributed by: Toho
- Release date: August 24, 2018 (Japan)
- Running time: 53 minutes
- Country: Japan
- Languages: Japanese; English

Modest Heroes (Japanese: ちいさな英雄－カニとタマゴと透明人間－, Hepburn: Chīsana Eiyū: Kani to Tamago to Tōmei Ningen) is a 2018 Japanese animated anthology film produced by Studio Ponoc. The film is the first volume in the studio's Ponoc Short Films Theatre anthology, and includes films written and directed by Hiromasa Yonebayashi, Yoshiyuki Momose, and Akihiko Yamashita.

== Plots ==
=== "Kanini & Kanino" ===
Kanini and Kanino are tiny anthropomorphized freshwater crab siblings who live underwater in a nearby stream. Their father, Toto, is taking care of them while their mother, Kaka, has gone away to give birth. When they suddenly find themselves alone, the siblings embark on a dangerous journey to find their father. All of the dialogue is performed in a made-up language.

=== "Life Ain't Gonna Lose" ===
Shun Yashima is a young boy born with a lethal allergy to eggs. Every day, then, his family focuses on protecting Shun from contact with eggs. Shun has to eat special meals at school, his classmates must be careful not to spit on him and get saliva with egg all over him, and Shun has to take his allergy into consideration when he thinks about going on a school field trip. At the same time, his mother tries to maintain her career as a dance teacher. One day Shun mistakenly consumes egg products when his parents are away from home.

=== "Invisible" ===
A man struggles with not being seen by those around him. Throughout the day, he is ignored by everyone else, and even begins to lose his physical permanence. An unexpected stranger speaks to him... and then the invisible man suddenly has an opportunity to be a hero.

== Characters ==
=== "Kanini & Kanino" ===
Kanini (カニーニ, Kanīni)
Voiced by: Fumino Kimura
Kanino (カニーノ, Kanīno)
Voiced by: Rio Suzuki
Toto (トト, Tōto)
Voiced by: Masaki Terasoma
Kaka (書か, Kāka)
Voiced by: Yūko Sasaki

=== "Life Ain't Gonna Lose" ===
Mom (ママ, Mama)
Voiced by: Machiko Ono (Japanese); Maggie Q (English)
Shun Yashima (矢嶋シュン, Yashima Shun)
Voiced by: Sōta Shinohara (Japanese); Henry Kaufman (English)
Dad (パパ, Papa)
Voiced by: Kentaro Sakaguchi (Japanese); Todd Haberkorn (English)
Doctor (医者, Isha)
Voiced by: Kentaro Sakaguchi (Japanese); Todd Haberkorn (English)

=== "Invisible" ===
The Invisible Man (透明人間, Tōmei ningen)
Voiced by: Joe Odagiri (Japanese); Liam O'Brien (English)
The Old Man (盲目の男性, Mōmoku no dansei)
Voiced by: Min Tanaka (Japanese); Mick Wingert (English)

== Production ==
Studio Ponoc announced on March 27, 2018, that it would be launching a new project called the Ponoc Short Films Theatre (ポノック短編劇場, Ponokku Tanpen Gekijō), an anthology of animated short films divided into volumes based on their themes. They announced that the first volume would be titled Modest Heroes, and would consist of three short films by former Studio Ghibli staffers Hiromasa Yonebayashi, Yoshiyuki Momose, and Akihiko Yamashita. The film is produced by Yoshiaki Nishimura. Yonebayashi's 18-minute "Kanini & Kanino" (カニーニとカニーノ, Kanīni to Kanīno) is a fantasy adventure film with music composed by Takatsugu Muramatsu, who had previously worked with the director on When Marnie Was There and Mary and the Witch's Flower. Momose's 16-minute "Life Ain't Gonna Lose" (サムライエッグ, Samurai Eggu) is a drama film scored by Masanori Shimada. The soundtrack is the first Shimada has composed for a film, having previously only worked in television. Yamashita's 13-minute "Invisible" (透明人間, Tōmei Ningen) is an action film with music by Yasutaka Nakata. The anthology's ending theme song is "Chiisana Eiyū" ("Modest Heroes") by Kaela Kimura.

The film was originally intended to have four rather than three segments, with the fourth being directed by Ghibli director Isao Takahata. However, Takahata died on April 5, 2018, so the film was limited to three segments.

== Release ==
The film was released in Japan on August 24, 2018. The film was released to DVD and Blu-ray by Walt Disney Japan on March 20, 2019.

On October 10, 2018, GKIDS announced it had acquired the North American distribution rights to Modest Heroes. It was released there on January 10, 2019. The North American home video package (Blu-ray/DVD combo) was released on June 18, 2019, distributed by Shout! Factory.

Modest Heroes was released onto Netflix around the world on September 6, 2019, as "A Netflix Original Movie" (except in Japan and in North America).
