= 43rd Annie Awards =

US media awards ceremony held in 2016

- Date: February 6, 2016
- Site: Royce Hall; Los Angeles, California, U.S.
- Hosted by: Jason Marsden
- Organized by: ASIFA-Hollywood

Highlights
- Best Animated Feature: Inside Out
- Best Direction: Pete Docter; Inside Out
- Most awards: Inside Out (10)
- Most nominations: Inside Out (14)

The 43rd Annual Annie Awards honoring excellence in the field of animation of 2015 was held on February 6, 2016, at the University of California, Los Angeles's Royce Hall in Los Angeles, California, presenting in 36 categories. This year, a new category called Best Animated Feature — Independent was introduced.

== Production categories ==
On December 1, 2015, the nominations for Annie Awards were announced. Inside Out earned the most number of nominations with 14, followed by The Good Dinosaur with 10. Minions earned seven nominations while Anomalisa, Shaun the Sheep Movie, and The Peanuts Movie each received five.

Best Animated Feature	Best Animated Special Production
Inside Out – Pixar, Walt Disney Studios Motion Pictures: Anomalisa – Paramount Pictures; Shaun the Sheep Movie – Aardman Animations; The Good Dinosaur – Pixar, Walt Disney Studios Motion Pictures; The Peanuts Movie – Blue Sky Studios, 20th Century Fox Animation	He Named Me Malala – Parkes-MacDonald / Little Door: Elf: Buddy's Musical Christmas – Warner Bros. Animation; I Am a Witness – Moonbot Studios; Kite – Epic Games; Kurt Cobain: Montage of Heck – End of Movie, LLC; Niko and the Sword of Light – Titmouse, Inc. / Amazon Studios
Best Animated Short Subject	Best Animated TV/Broadcast Commercial
World of Tomorrow – Don Hertzfeldt: Carface – National Film Board of Canada; DISSONANCE – frameboX; If I Was God... – National Film Board of Canada; On Ice – Google/Evil Eye Pictures; Sanjay's Super Team – Pixar	Coca-Cola 'Man and Dog' – Psyop: Chex Party Mix: "Holiday Magic" – Stoopid Buddy Stoodios; Michelin Total Performance: "All the Performances In Every Tire" – Moonbot Studios; We Are All Farmers – Acme Filmworks
Best General Audience Animated TV/Broadcast Production For Preschool Children	Best Animated TV/Broadcast Production For Children's Audience
Tumble Leaf - Episode: Mirror – Amazon Studios and Bix Pix Entertainment: Bubble Guppies - Episode: 326 - "Super Guppies!" – Nickelodeon / Nelvana; PAW Patrol - Episode: 213, Pups Save a MerPup – Spin Master Entertainment, Nickelodeon Productions; Peter Rabbit - Episode: 216 - The Kitten and Pig Adventure – Nickelodeon Productions, Silvergate Media; Sheriff Callie's Wild West - Episode: #201A "The Good, the Bad & the Yo-Yo" – Wild Canary Animation / Disney Junior; Little Einsteins - Episode: 228 "Build It, Rocket!" - Disney Channel; Transformers: Rescue Bots - Episode: "I Have Heard The Robots Singing" – Hasbro Studios; Sesame Street - Episode: "Elmo The Grouch" - Sesame Workshop	Wander Over Yonder - Episode: The Breakfast – Disney Television Animation: Clarence - Episode: Turtle Hats – Cartoon Network Studios; Gravity Falls - Episode: Not What He Seems – Disney Television Animation; Harvey Beaks - Episode: A Day of No To-Do – Nickelodeon Animation Studio; Sanjay and Craig - Episode: Street Dogg – Nickelodeon Animation Studio; Star vs. the Forces of Evil - Episode: Blood Moon Ball – Disney Television Animation; Steven Universe - Episode: Jail Break – Cartoon Network Studios
Best General Audience Animated TV/Broadcast Production	Best Animated Feature — Independent
The Simpsons - Episode: Halloween of Horror – Gracie Films in association with 20th Century Fox Television: Bob's Burgers - Episode: Can't Buy Me Math – 20th Century Fox Television, Bento Box Entertainment; BoJack Horseman - Episode: Brand New Couch – The Tornante Company; Moonbeam City - Episode: Quest for Aquatica – Titmouse, Inc. / Comedy Central	Boy and the World – Filme de Papel: Kahlil Gibran's The Prophet – Ventanarosa; The Boy and the Beast – Studio Chizu; When Marnie Was There – Studio Ghibli
Best Student Film
ed – Taha Neyestani: Can I Stay? – Ringling College of Art and Design; Dodoba – Yon Hui Lee; Life Smartphone – Xie Chenglin; Mother – Stephanie Chiew; Nice To Meeteor You – Yizhou Li; Shift – Maria Cecilia Puglesi; The Casebook of Nips & Porkington – Melody Wang

== Individual achievement categories ==
Outstanding Achievement, Animated Effects in an Animated Production	Outstanding Achievement, Animated Effects in a Live Action Production
Jon Reisch, Stephen Marshall, Magnus Wrenninge, Michael Hall, Michael K. O'Brien – The Good Dinosaur – Pixar: Greg Gladstone, Tim Hoff, Mark Newport, Jason Rickwald, Stephen Wood – Home – DreamWorks Animation; Chris Logan, Brian Casper, Gavin Baxter, William Eckroat – Hotel Transylvania 2 – Sony Pictures Animation; Amit Baadkar, Dave Hale, Vincent Serritella, Paul Mendoza – Inside Out – Pixar; Frank Baradat, Antonin Seydoux, Milo Riccarand, Nicolas Brack – Minions – Illumination Entertainment; Brice Mallier, Paul Buckley, Brent Droog, Alex Whyte, Jonothan Freisler – The SpongeBob Movie: Sponge Out of Water – Paramount Animation	Michael Balog, Jim Van Allen, Florent Andorra, George Kaltenbrunner – Avengers: Age of Ultron – Marvel Studios: Raul Essig, Roman Schmidt, Mark Chataway, Ryan Hopkins – Jurassic World – Universal Studios / Legendary Pictures; Ronnie Menahem, Pavani Rao Boddapati, Francois Sugny, Leslie Chan, Nicolas Petit – Maze Runner: The Scorch Trials – Gotham Group / 20th Century Fox; Ronnie Menahem, Brian Goodwin, Jason Lazaroff, Paul Harris, James Ogle – The Hobbit: The Battle of the Five Armies – Metro Goldwyn Mayer / New Line Cinema / WingNut Films / 3Foot7
Outstanding Achievement, Character Animation in an Animated Television/Broadcast Production	Outstanding Achievement, Character Animation in a Feature Production
Chi-Ho Chan – Dragons: Race to the Edge - Episode: Have Dragon Will Travel, Part 1 – DreamWorks Animation Television: Yong-Zhi Sun – Dragons: Race to the Edge - Episode: Have Dragon Will Travel, Part 2 – DreamWorks Animation Television; Alfonso Estrada – Elf: Buddy's Musical Christmas - Episode: Elf: Buddy's Musical Christmas – Screen Novelties / Warner Bros. Animation; Scott DaRos – Elf: Buddy's Musical Christmas - Episode: Elf: Buddy's Musical Christmas – Screen Novelties / Warner Bros. Animation; Maurizio Parimbelli – Peter Rabbit - Episode: 216 - The Kitten and Pig Adventure – Nickelodeon Productions / Silvergate Media; Ryan MacNeil – Turbo FAST - Episode: "Turboldly Go" – DreamWorks Animation Television; Justin Nichols – Wander Over Yonder - Episode: The Good Bad Guy – Disney Television Animation	Allison Rutland – Inside Out – Pixar: Mark Donald – Home – DreamWorks Animation; Travis Hathaway – Inside Out – Pixar; Hichem Arfaoui – Minions – Illumination Entertainment; Mark C. Harris – The Good Dinosaur – Pixar; K.C. Roeyer – The Good Dinosaur – Pixar; BJ Crawford – The Peanuts Movie – Blue Sky Studios, 20th Century Fox Animation
Outstanding Achievement, Character Animation in a Live Action Production	Outstanding Achievement, Character Animation in a Video Game
Matthew Shumway, Adrian Millington, Blaine Toderian, Alexander Poei, Kevin Lan – The Revenant – The Bear – Regency Enterprises, New Regency Pictures, Anonymous Content, M Productions, Appian Way, RatPac-Dune Entertainment: Glen McIntosh, Kevin Martel, Kyle Winkelman, Rodrick Fransham, Kaori Ogino – Jurassic World – Indominus Rex – Universal Studios / Legendary Pictures; Jakub Pistecky, Gang Trinh, Craig Penn, Mickael Coedel, Yair Gutierrez – Avengers: Age of Ultron – The Hulk – Marvel Studios; Peter Tan, Boonyiki Lim, Sachio Nishiyama, Byounghee Cho, Roy Tan – Avengers: Age of Ultron– Ultron – Marvel Studios; Aaron Gilman, Howard Sly, Matthew Riordan, Kevin Kelm, Guillaume Francois – The Hobbit: The Battle of the Five Armies– Azog – Metro Goldwyn Mayer / New Line Cinema / WingNut Films / 3Foot7; David Clayton, Gios Johnston, Andreja Vuckovic, Guillaume Francois, Daniel Zettl – The Hobbit: The Battle of the Five Armies – Smaug – Metro Goldwyn Mayer / New Line Cinema / WingNut Films / 3Foot7	David Gibson – Evolve – 2K Games: Mike Dietz – Armikrog – Pencil Test Studios, Inc.; Bruce Chang – Invisible, Inc. – Klei Entertainment
Outstanding Achievement, Character Design in an Animated TV/Broadcast Production	Outstanding Achievement, Character Design in an Animated Feature Production
Craig Kellman – Elf: Buddy's Musical Christmas - Episode: Elf: Buddy's Musical Christmas – Screen Novelties / Warner Bros. Animation: Junpei Takayama – Breadwinners - Episode: Wrath of the Pizza Lord – Nickelodeon in association with Titmouse Canada Animation, Inc.; David Tilton – Harvey Beaks - Episode: Night Club Night – Nickelodeon; Tapan Gandhi – Pickle and Peanut - Episode: Swim Lessons – Disney Television Animation; Dave Cooper, Steve Hirt – Pig Goat Banana Cricket - Episode: Pig Goat Banana Cricket High Five! – Nickelodeon; Gordon Hammond, Steve Hirt, Jennifer Wood, Mike Dougherty – Pig Goat Banana Cricket - Episode: Miss Cutesy Meow Meows – Nickelodeon; Chris Mitchell, Keiko Murayama – The Mr. Peabody & Sherman Show - Episode: "New Sponsor/Cleopatra" – DreamWorks Animation Television	Albert Lozano, Chris Sasaki – Inside Out – Pixar: Craig Kellman, Stephen DeStefano – Hotel Transylvania 2 – Sony Pictures Animation; Eric Guillon – Minions – Illumination Entertainment; Matt Nolte – The Good Dinosaur – Pixar
Outstanding Achievement, Directing in an Animated TV/Broadcast Production	Outstanding Achievement, Directing in an Animated Feature Production
Matt Braly – Gravity Falls - Episode: Northwest Mansion Mystery – Disney Television Animation: Bryan Fordney – Archer - Episode: Edie's Wedding – FX Productions; Dave Wasson – Mickey Mouse - Episode: Coned – Disney Television Animation; TJ Sullivan – Dragons: Race to the Edge - Episode: "Reign of Fireworms" – DreamWorks Animation Television; Mark Caballero, Seamus Walsh – Elf: Buddy's Musical Christmas - Episode: Elf: Buddy's Musical Christmas – Screen Novelties / Warner Bros. Animation; Heiko Dregenberg – Mickey Mouse - Episode: Bottle Shocked – Disney Television Animation; Ken Wong – Pickle and Peanut - Episode: Pickle the Falcon Master – Disney Television Animation; Ian Jones-Quartey – Steven Universe - Episode: The Test – Cartoon Network Studios	Pete Docter – Inside Out – Pixar: Charlie Kaufman and Duke Johnson – Anomalisa – Paramount Pictures; Raul Garcia – Extraordinary Tales – Melusine Productions and R&R Communications; Roger Allers – Kahlil Gibran's The Prophet – Ventanarosa; Mark Burton and Richard Starzak – Shaun the Sheep Movie – Aardman Animations; Steve Martino – The Peanuts Movie – Blue Sky Studios, 20th Century Fox Animation; Hiromasa Yonebayashi – When Marnie Was There – Studio Ghibli
Outstanding Achievement, Music in an Animated TV/Broadcast Production	Outstanding Achievement, Music in an Animated Feature Production
Christopher Willis – Mickey Mouse - Episode: ¡Feliz Cumpleaños! – Disney Television Animation: Matthew Sklar, Christopher Guardino – Elf: Buddy's Musical Christmas - Episode: Elf: Buddy's Musical Christmas – Screen Novelties / Warner Bros. Animation; Einar Tonsberg – Puffin Rock - Episode: Night Lights – Cartoon Saloon, Dog Ears, Penguin Books; Nick Bachman, Neil Graf, Matt Mahaffey, Jonathan Hylander – Sanjay and Craig - Episode: Street Dogg – Nickelodeon; Mike Himelstein, Joe Ansolabehere, Mike Barnett – Sheriff Callie's Wild West - Episode: #201A "The Good, the Bad & the Yo-Yo" – Wild Canary Animation, Disney Junior; J.G. Thirlwell – The Venture Bros: All This And Gargantua-2 – Titmouse, Inc. / Adult Swim; Andy Bean – Wander Over Yonder - Episode: The Black Cube – Disney Television Animation	Michael Giacchino – Inside Out – Pixar: Carter Burwell – Anomalisa – Paramount Pictures; Kevin Riepl – Batman Unlimited: Monster Mayhem – Warner Bros. Animation; Ruben Feffer, Gustavo Kurlat, GEM Grupo Experimental de Música, Emicida – Boy and the World – Filme de Papel; Mychael Danna, Jeff Danna – The Good Dinosaur – Pixar
Outstanding Achievement, Production Design in an Animated TV/Broadcast Production	Outstanding Achievement, Production Design in an Animated Feature Production
Kevin Dart, Sylvia Liu, Chris Turnham, Eastwood Wong – The Mr. Peabody and Sherman Show - Episode: Peabody's Parents/Galileo – DreamWorks Animation Television: Jonathan Pyun, Aaron Spurgeon, Baptiste Lucas, Margaret Wuller, Ethan Becker – Dawn of the Croods - Episode: "Garden of Eaten" – DreamWorks Animation Television; Ernie Gilbert, Kristin Donner, Steve Meyers, Fred Gardner, David Cole – Fresh Beat Band of Spies - Episode: 107, Singing Pirate – Nickelodeon Productions / 6 Point 2 / Nelvana; Ian Worrel, Jeffrey Thompson – Gravity Falls - Episode: Xpcveaoqfoxso (Weirdmageddon) – Disney Television Animation; Dave Cooper, Mike Dougherty, Francis Giglio – Pig Goat Banana Cricket - Episode: Happy Chalawunga! – Nickelodeon; Dave Cooper, Mike Dougherty, Francis Giglio – Pig Goat Banana Cricket - Episode: Prank Thy Neighbor – Nickelodeon; Lily Bernard, Marie Thorhauge, Stefano Scapolan – Puffin Rock - Episode: Night Lights – Cartoon Saloon, Dog Ears, Penguin Books	Ralph Eggleston – Inside Out – Pixar: Alê Abreu – Boy and the World – Filme de Papel; Jasin Carpenter – He Named Me Malala – Parkes-MacDonald / Little Room; Emil Mitev – Home – DreamWorks Animation; Eric Guillon – Minions – Illumination Entertainment; Matt Perry, Gavin Lines – Shaun the Sheep Movie – Aardman Animations; Harley Jessup, Sharon Calahan, Bryn Imagire, Noah Klocek, Huy Nguyen – The Good Dinosaur – Pixar
Outstanding Achievement, Storyboarding in an Animated TV/Broadcast Production	Outstanding Achievement, Storyboarding in an Animated Feature Production
Alonso Ramirez Ramos – Mickey Mouse - Episode: ¡Feliz Cumpleaños! – Disney Television Animation: Tom Herpich – Adventure Time - Episode: Walnuts & Rain – Cartoon Network Studios; Heidi Jo Gilbert – Dragons: Race to the Edge - Episode: Eye of the Beholder (Part 1 and 2) – DreamWorks Animation; Sung Jin Ahn, Ben Juwono, David Woo, Donna Lee – Niko and the Sword of Light — Episode: (pilot) – Titmouse, Inc. / Amazon Studios; Joe Johnston, Jeff Liu, Rebecca Sugar – Steven Universe - Episode: Jail Break – Cartoon Network Studios; Ben Juwono – The Adventures of Puss in Boots - Episode: Hidden – DreamWorks Animation Television; Justin Nichols – Wander Over Yonder - Episode: The Breakfast – Disney Television Animation; Madeline Sharafian, Manny Hernandez, Bert Youn – We Bare Bears - Episode: Burrito – Cartoon Network Studios	Tony Rosenast – Inside Out – Pixar: Antonio Santamaria – Extraordinary Tales – Melusine Productions and R&R Communications; Mike Smukavic – Hotel Transylvania 2 – Sony Pictures Animation; Domee Shi – Inside Out – Pixar; Habib Louati – Minions – Illumination Entertainment; Bill Presing – The Good Dinosaur – Pixar; Rosana Sullivan – The Good Dinosaur – Pixar; J.P. Vine, Tony Rosenast, Enrico Casarosa – The Good Dinosaur – Pixar
Outstanding Achievement, Voice Acting in an Animated TV/Broadcast Production	Outstanding Achievement, Voice Acting in an Animated Feature Production
Kristen Schaal as the voice of Louise Belcher – Bob's Burgers - Episode: Hawk & Chick – 20th Century Fox Television / Bento Box Entertainment: Eric Bauza as the voice of Buhdeuce – Breadwinners - Episode: Movie Ducks – Nickelodeon in association with Titmouse Canada Animation, Inc.; Grey Griffin as the voice of Lerk – Dawn of the Croods - Episode: “The First Picture Show”, “School of Hard Rocks” – DreamWorks Animation Television; Laraine Newman as the voice of Amber – Dawn of the Croods - Episode: “The First Picture Show”, “Mom Genes” – DreamWorks Animation Television; Matt Jones as the voice of Pig – Pig Goat Banana Cricket - Episode: Underpants-Palooza – Nickelodeon; Alan Tudyk as the voice of Ludo – Star vs. the Forces of Evil - Episode: Compilation from Series – Disney Television Animation; Eric Bauza as the voice of Puss in Boots – The Adventures of Puss in Boots - Episode: Various – DreamWorks Animation Television; Kevin Michael Richardson as the voice of Mr. Gus – Uncle Grandpa - Episode: Uncle Grandpa at the Movies – Cartoon Network Studios	Phyllis Smith as the voice of Sadness – Inside Out – Pixar: Jennifer Jason Leigh as the voice of Lisa Hesselman – Anomalisa – Paramount Pictures; Amy Poehler as the voice of Joy – Inside Out – Pixar; Pierre Coffin as the voice of The Minions – Minions – Illumination Entertainment; Jon Hamm as the voice of Herb Overkill – Minions – Illumination Entertainment; Alex Garfin as the voice of Linus – The Peanuts Movie – Blue Sky Studios, 20th Century Fox Animation; Hadley Belle Miller as the voice of Lucy – The Peanuts Movie – Blue Sky Studios, 20th Century Fox Animation; Tom Kenny as the voice of SpongeBob SquarePants – The SpongeBob Movie: Sponge Out of Water – Paramount Animation
Outstanding Achievement, Writing in an Animated TV/Broadcast Production	Outstanding Achievement, Writing in an Animated Feature Production
Steven Davis, Kelvin Yu – Bob's Burgers - Episode: The Hauntening – 20th Century Fox Television, Bento Box Entertainment: Kent Osborne, Pendleton Ward, Jack Pendarvis, Jillian Tamaki, Adam Muto – Adventure Time - Episode: The Diary – Cartoon Network Studios; Alex Hirsch, Shion Takeuchi, Josh Weinstein, Jeff Rowe, Matt Chapman – Gravity Falls - Episode: Not What He Seems – Disney Television Animation; Al Jean – The Simpsons - Episode: I Won't Be Home for Christmas – Gracie Films in association with 20th Century Fox Television	Pete Docter, Meg LeFauve, Josh Cooley – Inside Out – Pixar: Mark Burton, Richard Starzak – Shaun the Sheep Movie – Aardman Animations; Hiromasa Yonebayashi – When Marnie Was There – Studio Ghibli
Outstanding Achievement, Editorial in an Animated TV/Broadcast Production	Outstanding Achievement, Editorial in an Animated Feature Production
Illya Owens – Mickey Mouse - Episode: Coned – Disney Television Animation: David Graig, Jeff Adams – All Hail King Julien - Episode: "Body Double" – DreamWorks Animation Television; John Laus – Dragons: Race to the Edge - Episode: "Dragon Eye of the Beholder, Part 1" – DreamWorks Animation Television; Mike Wright – Elf: Buddy's Musical Christmas - Episode: Elf: Buddy's Musical Christmas – Screen Novelties / Warner Bros. Animation; Nolan Southerland, William Kessler, Benjamin Rush – Lost Treasure Hunt — Episode: Columbus Voyage Revisited – Argosy Film Group; Anne Harting, Shawn Lemmonier, Lauren Crist, Carmen Woods – Phineas and Ferb - Episode: Last Day of Summer – Disney Television Animation; Ted Supa – Star vs. the Forces of Evil - Episode: Storm the Castle – Disney Television Animation	Kevin Nolting – Inside Out – Pixar: Garret Elkins – Anomalisa – Paramount Pictures; Jennifer Dolce – Kahlil Gibran's The Prophet – Ventanarosa; Sim Evan-Jones – Shaun the Sheep Movie – Aardman Animations

== Juried awards ==
Winsor McCay Award
Joe Ranft, Phil Roman and Isao Takahata
for their career contributions to the art of animation
June Foray Award
Charles Solomon
for his significant and benevolent or charitable impact on the art and industry of animation

== Multiple awards and nominations ==
=== Films ===
The following films received multiple nominations:

Nominations	Film
14	Inside Out
10	The Good Dinosaur
7	Minions
5	Anomalisa
5	The Peanuts Movie
5	Shaun the Sheep Movie
3	Avengers: Age of Ultron
3	Boy and the World
3	The Hobbit: The Battle of the Five Armies
3	Home
3	Hotel Transylvania 2
3	Kahlil Gibran's The Prophet
3	When Marnie Was There
2	Extraordinary Tales
2	He Named Me Malala
2	Jurassic World
2	The SpongeBob Movie: Sponge Out of Water

The following film received multiple awards:

Wins	Film
10	Inside Out

=== Television/Broadcast ===
The following television productions received multiple nominations:

Nominations	Film
7	Elf: Buddy's Musical Christmas
5	Dragons: Race to the Edge
5	Mickey Mouse
5	Pig Goat Banana Cricket
4	Gravity Falls
4	Wander Over Yonder
3	Bob's Burgers
3	Dawn of the Croods
3	Star vs. the Forces of Evil
3	Steven Universe
2	The Adventures of Puss in Boots
2	Adventure Time
2	Breadwinners
2	Harvey Beaks
2	The Mr. Peabody & Sherman Show
2	Niko and the Sword of Light
2	Peter Rabbit
2	Pickle and Peanut
2	Puffin Rock
2	Sanjay and Craig
2	Sheriff Callie's Wild West
2	The Simpsons

The following television productions received multiple awards:

Wins	Film
3	Mickey Mouse
2	Bob's Burgers
