= Akihiko Yamashita =

Japanese animator

Akihiko Yamashita (山下 明彦, Yamashita Akihiko; born February 6, 1966, in Okayama Prefecture, Chūgoku, Japan) is a Studio Ghibli and Studio Ponoc animator who is famous for Howl's Moving Castle and Giant Robo (OVA).

== Works ==
=== As a character designer and animator ===
- Urotsukidōji (1987–1991)
- Relic Armor Legaciam (1987)
- Giant Robo (1992–1994) (with Toshiyuki Kubooka)
- Wonder Project J2: Corlo no Mori no Josette (1996)
- Princess Nine (1998)
- Strange Dawn (2000)
- Howl's Moving Castle (2004)
- Tide Line Blue (2005)
- Zegapain (2006)
- Tales from Earthsea (2006)
- The Secret World of Arrietty (2010)
- From Up on Poppy Hill (2011)
- Mary and the Witch's Flower (2017)
- Cagaster of an Insect Cage (2020)

=== As a director ===
- A Sumo Wrestler's Tail (Ghibli Museum short) (2010)
- Modest Heroes (2018)
