= Yoshiaki Nishimura =

Japanese film producer

- Born: 西村 義明; September 25, 1977 (age 48); Tokyo, Japan
- Occupation: Film producer
- Years active: 2004–present
- Notable work: The Tale of Princess Kaguya; When Marnie Was There

Yoshiaki Nishimura (西村 義明, Nishimura Yoshiaki; born September 25, 1977 in Tokyo, Japan) is a Japanese lead film producer formerly of Studio Ghibli and founder of Studio Ponoc. He was nominated for the Academy Award for Best Animated Feature in 2014 for The Tale of Princess Kaguya and received a consecutive nomination in 2015 for When Marnie Was There in the same category.

== Career ==
On Sunday, September 1, 2013, Hayao Miyazaki held a press conference in Venice to confirm his retirement, saying: "I know I've said I would retire many times in the past. Many of you must think, 'Once again.' But this time I am quite serious." In March 2014, Toshio Suzuki retired as producer and assumed the new position of general manager. Yoshiaki Nishimura replaced Suzuki in the producer role.

On August 3, 2014, Toshio Suzuki announced that Studio Ghibli would take a "brief pause" to re-evaluate and restructure in the wake of Miyazaki's retirement. He stated some concerns about where the company would go in the future. This led to speculation that Studio Ghibli will never produce another feature film again. On November 7, 2014, Miyazaki stated, "That was not my intention, though. All I did was announce that I would be retiring and not making any more features." Lead producer Yoshiaki Nishimura among several other staffers from Ghibli, such as director Hiromasa Yonebayashi, left to found Studio Ponoc in April 2015, working on the film Mary and the Witch's Flower.

== Filmography ==
- 2004: Howl's Moving Castle (film)
- 2013: The Kingdom of Dreams and Madness
- 2013: The Tale of Princess Kaguya
- 2014: When Marnie Was There
- 2017: Mary and the Witch's Flower
- 2018: Modest Heroes
- 2021: Tomorrow's Leaves
- 2023: The Boy and the Heron (co-producer)
- 2023: The Imaginary

== See also ==
- List of Asian Academy Award winners and nominees
- Studio Ponoc
