= Tomorrow's Leaves =

Japanese short anime film

- Film release poster
- Directed by: Yoshiyuki Momose
- Story by: Yoshiaki Nishimura
- Produced by: Yoshiaki Nishimura
- Cinematography: Atsushi Okui
- Edited by: Toshihiko Kojima; Yumiko Nakaba
- Music by: Takatsugu Muramatsu
- Production company: Studio Ponoc
- Release dates: June 14, 2021 (Annecy); July 23, 2021
- Running time: 8 minutes 28 seconds
- Country: Japan

Tomorrow's Leaves is a 2021 hand-drawn Japanese animated short film which is produced by Studio Ponoc. The Olympic Foundation of Culture (OFCH) commissioned Studio Ponoc for this film project to commemorate the Tokyo 2020 Olympics, on ahead of the Olympics' opening ceremony.

Tomorrow's Leaves premiered at the opening Ceremony of Annecy International Animated Film Festival on June 14, 2021. From then, it was shown at the Skytree Round Theatre from July 12, 2021, to September 5, 2021. And lastly, it is scheduled to play in United Cinema Theatre from July 23, 2021, to July 29, 2021. On July 23, 2021, the film was released at the International Olympic Committee website and The Olympic Museum YouTube channel worldwide.

== Plot ==
The synopsis of the series was published by International Olympic Committee:

The annual arrival of the message leaf causes concern – something is undeniably wrong. Its usually vibrant and lasting colours quickly fade, and it suddenly withers and crumbles. Five envoys, from five diverse lands, are dispatched to find out what has happened. The envoys travel to a distant land, quietly guided by tiny spirits. Each envoy has its own strengths and vulnerabilities. They compete and support each other as they draw closer to their destination, facing treacherous terrain and difficult conditions. Through athletic challenges and the uniting power of sport, they discover the positive fundamental values that come with playful competition. Together, the envoys approach near the source of the message leaf. Can they restore life to a future in peril?
