= Tatekawa =

Tatekawa (written: 立川 or 建川) is a Japanese surname. Notable people with the surname include:

- Harumichi Tatekawa (立川 理道, born 1989), Japanese rugby union player
- Tatekawa Shinosuke (立川 志の輔, born 1954), Japanese rakugo performer
- Yoshitsugu Tatekawa (建川 美次, 1880–1945), Japanese diplomat and general
- Tatekawa Oyakata (born 1972), Japanese sumo wrestler and coach
