= Takatsugu Muramatsu =

Japanese composer and arranger (born 1978)

Takatsugu Muramatsu 村松 崇継
- Born: July 2, 1978 (age 48); Hamamatsu, Shizuoka, Japan
- Genres: Film score; J-pop
- Occupations: Composer; arranger; music producer; Pianist
- Years active: 1996–present
- Label: Story Music Tellers
- Website: https://www.muramatsu-t.net

Takatsugu Muramatsu (村松 崇継, Muramatsu Takatsugu; born July 2, 1978) is a Japanese composer, arranger and music producer. He is best known for his collaborations in Studio Ghibli's When Marnie Was There. He won Best Music thrice at the Japan Academy Film Prize.

In 1996, he released his first solo work, Mado, while in high school. In 2001, he debuted as a movie music composer with Inugami. The same year, he graduated from the Kunitachi College of Music. In 2009, he held his first solo piano concert tour in five places across Japan. In 2014, his music on the movie When Marnie Was There received praise from critics. During that year, his works were featured in Natsumi Abe's cover album Hikari He. He was also included in Mariya Takeuchi's studio album, Trad, which won an award at the 56th Japan Record Awards. In 2018, Empire listed his music from Mary and the Witch's Flower among the best movie soundtrack songs of the year.

== Discography ==
=== Solo ===
Year	Title	Notes	Ref.
1996	Mado		
1999	Tokyo		
2001	Brew		
2004	Spiritual of the Mind		
2009	Piano Sings		
2011	Lovely Notes of Life		
2018	Aoki Uribe no Catharsis"		
2019	Michishirube		

== Works ==
=== Anime ===
==== TV series ====
Year	Title	Ref.
2010	Lilpri	

==== Films and original video animations ====
Year	Title	Notes	Ref.
2014	When Marnie Was There		
2017	Mary and the Witch's Flower		
2017	Lu Over the Wall		
2018	Modest Heroes		
2021	Fortune Favors Lady Nikuko		
2023	Phoenix		
2025	ChaO		

=== Theatrical films ===
Year	Title	Ref.
2001	Inugami	
2002	The Choice of Hercules	
2004	Jiyuu Renai	
2007	Shadow Spirit	
2007	Orionza kara Shoutaijou	
2007	Town of Evening Calm, Country of Cherry Blossoms	
2008	Climber's High	
2009	Nobody to Watch Over Me	
2010	The Lady Shogun and Her Men	
2011	Life Back Then	
2012	The Castle of Crossed Destinies	
2013	Reunion	
2014	Dakishimetai: Shinjitsu no Monogatari	
2015	At Home	
2016	Six Four	
2016	The Good Morning Show	
2017	The 8-Year Engagement	
2019	Ano Hi no Organ	
2019	Soshite, Ikiru	
2021	In the Wake	
2022	Ox Head Village	
2022	Tonbi	
2023	In Love and Deep Water	

=== Television dramas ===
Year	Title	Ref.
2004	Tenka	
2004	Itsuwari no Hanazono	
2005	Nihon no Korekara-Koufuku 2020	
2005	Keiyaku Kekkon	
2006	Hyōheki	
2006	Inochi no Kiseki	
2008	Kansa Houjin	
2008	Kimi no Nozomu Shi ni Kata	
2008	Tobira wa Tozasareta mama	
2008	Dandan	
2009	Dare mo Mamorenai	
2009	小公女セイラ	
2010	Osaka Soul & Love	
2010	Madonna Verde	
2011	Life Back Then	
2011	Chouchou-san	
2012	Daichi no Fanfare	
2012	Mou Ichido Kimi ni Propose	
2012	Akai Ito no Hito	
2012	Makete, Katsu	
2012	Ooku	
2014	Ji no Shio	
2014	Tsumatachi no Shinkansen	
2014	Kabu Kabou Raku	
2015	Kageriyuku Natsu	
2016	Gold Case: Shinjitsu no Tobira	
2018	Keishichō Bunsho Sōsakan	
2018	Last Chance	
2018	Descending Stories: Showa Genroku Rakugo Shinju	
2019	The Longest Day in Chang'an	
2019	Soshite, Ikiru	
2020	Seventy Seven	
2020	Ryuu no Michi	
2021	Sakura no Tou	
2022	Shizuka-chan to Papa	
2023	Akujo ni Tsuite	
2023	Bankake: Keishichō Jidōsha Keira-tai	
2023	Kono Subarashiki Sekai	
2024	Banpaku no Taiyou	
2024	Minami-kun no Koibito	

== Songwriting credits ==
=== 2010s ===
List of songs written for other artists, showing year released and album name
Year	Title	Artist(s)	Album/Single
2012	"Inochi no Uta"	Mariya Takeuchi	Trad
2014	"Hikari he"	Natsumi Abe	Hikari He: Classical & Crossover

=== 2020s ===
List of songs written for other artists, showing year released and album name
Year	Title	Artist(s)	Album/Single
2023	"Yuusha no Hata"	Shizuka Kudo	Yuusha no Hata
2023	"Kibou"	Wakana	Kibou
2024	"Kimi to Watashi no Uta", "Haruka"	Yakushimaru Hiroko	Time
