= Mary and the Witch's Flower =

- Theatrical release poster

Japanese name
- Kanji: メアリと魔女の花
Transcriptions
- Revised Hepburn: Meari to Majo no Hana
- Directed by: Hiromasa Yonebayashi
- Screenplay by: Riko Sakaguchi; Hiromasa Yonebayashi
- Based on: The Little Broomstick by Mary Stewart
- Produced by: Yoshiaki Nishimura
- Starring: Hana Sugisaki; Yūki Amami; Fumiyo Kohinata; Hikari Mitsushima; Jiro Sato; Kenichi Endō; Eri Watanabe; Shinobu Otake
- Cinematography: Toru Fukushi
- Edited by: Toshihiko Kojima
- Music by: Takatsugu Muramatsu
- Production company: Studio Ponoc
- Distributed by: Toho
- Release date: 8 July 2017
- Running time: 103 minutes
- Country: Japan
- Language: Japanese
- Box office: $42 million

Mary and the Witch's Flower (Japanese: メアリと魔女の花, Hepburn: Meari to Majo no Hana) is a 2017 Japanese animated fantasy film directed by Hiromasa Yonebayashi from a screenplay he co-wrote with Riko Sawaguchi. It was produced by Yoshiaki Nishimura, animated by Studio Ponoc, and distributed by Toho in Japan. Based on the 1971 book The Little Broomstick by Mary Stewart, it was Ponoc's first feature film. It stars Hana Sugisaki, Yūki Amami, Fumiyo Kohinata, Hikari Mitsushima, Jiro Sato, Kenichi Endō, Eri Watanabe, and Shinobu Otake.

In the film, Mary Smith (Sugisaki) finds "fly-by-night", a mysterious flower that can give her the power to become a witch for only one night. The film was released in Japan on 8 July 2017. The film received generally positive reviews from critics, who praised the animation and visuals.

== Plot ==
Mary Smith moves into the Shropshire country estate of her Great Aunt Charlotte. The bored, friendless girl unsuccessfully tries making herself useful through chores. A local boy named Peter teases her for her clumsiness and wild red hair. Tib and Gib, Peter's cats, lead Mary to some mysterious glowing flowers. The gardener Zebedee identifies the flowers as "fly-by-night"; legend has it that witches covet the flower for its magical power. The next day, Gib disappears. Tib leads Mary to a broomstick but she accidentally bursts a fly-by-night bulb on it. The bulb releases magical power, making the broomstick come to life and enabling Mary to ride it like a witch. The Little Broomstick whisks Mary away to a complex of buildings in the clouds, known as Endor College for witches.

Headmistress Madam Mumblechook assumes Mary is a new pupil with Tib as her familiar, and takes her on a tour of the college. She introduces Mary to Doctor Dee, the college's renowned chemistry teacher. Mary finds herself able to perform advanced spells such as invisibility. Madam and Dee become convinced that Mary is a prodigy because of her performance as well as her red hair, which is a distinguishing feature among the best witches.

Mary admits that her magical ability comes from fly-by-night, and that Tib belongs to Peter. Madam's attitude changes then but she lets Mary return home once Mary turns over Peter's address. That night, Madam sends a message to Mary, informing that she's kidnapped Peter, and demands that Mary bring the fly-by-night bulbs to her. She and Tib quickly fly back to Endor with the bulbs, but Madam and Dee imprison her in their transformation laboratory. Mary finds Peter locked in with her, and discovers that Dee has been experimenting on animals, including Gib, transforming them into fantastical creatures. From the spell book she took from Madam's office, Mary uses a spell to undo the transformations and unlock the lab. They try escaping on the Little Broomstick, but Peter is recaptured.

The Little Broomstick takes Mary to an isolated cottage on a tiny island that seems to be alive. Inside the cottage, Mary finds notes on spells and a mirror that Charlotte uses to contact her. Through visions, Charlotte reveals that the cottage was her old home, and she used to be a red-haired pupil who excelled at Endor. One day, Charlotte found fly-by-night on the campus, leading Madam and Dee to obsessively use the flower to transform all humans into witches. When their experiments failed, Charlotte escaped Endor, taking the flower with her. Charlotte begs Mary to use her last bulbs to return home, but Mary vows to rescue Peter.

The Little Broomstick is eventually damaged, forcing Mary to run back to Endor. She arrives just as Madam and Dee is about to transform Peter into a warlock. The experiment fails again, trapping Peter within a gelatinous monster. Mary gets the spell book to Peter, and he uses it to undo the failed experiment and Madam and Dee's research. Mary and Peter fly home on the repaired Little Broomstick, with her throwing away her last bulb and saying she does not need magic.

== Characters ==
- Mary Smith, a 10-year-old girl who is innocent and often curious. She has red hair in pigtails, blue eyes, and freckles. She lives in a red house with her Great-Aunt Charlotte, and she does nothing well and spends her days in frustration and anxiety. One day, she finds a fly-by-night flower in the forest which eventually leads her to Endor College. Voiced by: Hana Sugisaki (Japanese); Ruby Barnhill (English)
- Peter, a boy who delivers newspapers in the village. Kidnapped by Madam Mumblechook, he escapes from Endor College with Mary. Voiced by: Ryunosuke Kamiki (Japanese); Louis Ashbourne Serkis (English)
- Madam Mumblechook, principal of Endor College, wants Mary's fly-by-night to use in magic transformation experiments. Voiced by: Yūki Amami (Japanese); Kate Winslet (English)
- Doctor Dee, a faculty member and mad scientist at Endor. He is studying transformation experiments and searches for the fly-by-night with Mumblechook. Voiced by: Fumiyo Kohinata (Japanese); Jim Broadbent (English)
- Charlotte, the great-aunt of Mary and a mistress of the house. She helps Mary when she is in danger. Voiced by: Shinobu Otake (old), Hikari Mitsushima (young) (Japanese); Lynda Baron (old), Teresa Gallagher (young) (English)
- Miss Banks, housekeeper of the red house. Voiced by: Eri Watanabe (Japanese); Morwenna Banks (English)
- Zebeedee, the estate gardener, tells Mary the secrets of the fly-by-night. Voiced by: Kenichi Endō (Japanese); Rasmus Hardiker (English)
- Redhead witch: Charlotte's younger self, a witch who stole the fly-by-night seeds. Like Mary, she was a red-haired girl, an earlier Endor school student. She discovers the fly-by-night is used by Madame and Doctor Dee to perform dangerous experiments. After a runaway experiment in which a classmate from Endor College became a subject, she took all the seeds and ran away, losing the seeds and her broom. She then led an ordinary life. Voiced by: Hikari Mitsushima (Japanese); Teresa Gallagher (English)
- Flanagan: the broomstick instructor who repairs Mary's broom. Voiced by: Jiro Sato (Japanese); Ewen Bremner (English)

== Production ==
A few months after Mary Stewart's novel of the same name was published in 1971, Walt Disney Productions acquired the film rights. In 1980, Mel Shaw and director Wolfgang Reitherman decided to adapt it into an animated feature following the release of The Fox and the Hound, but studio management, including newly-appointed CEO Ron W. Miller, felt the project was too similar to Bedknobs and Broomsticks. Also, they wanted the animation department to produce more ambitious films such as The Black Cauldron.

On 15 December 2016, Yonebayashi and Nishimura held a press conference. Here Yonebayashi, who had previously worked with Ghibli on When Marnie Was There and Arrietty, said "This is the first movie since leaving Studio Ghibli. At Studio Ponoc, we are working diligently with Yoshiaki Nishimura, a producer, and excellent staff."

When Nishimura was asked about the establishment of the new studio he said, "When the Studio Ghibli producer Toshio Suzuki notified me about the dissolution of the Ghibli Production Department, I was stimulated by the oversea creators when I went to the Academy Awards venue with The Tale of Princess Kaguya. Remember that you received it." After announcing it was based on The Little Broomstick, Nisimura said, "Marnie of Memories is a work that proved that Yonebayashi, who excels at dynamic painting, sealed his specialty and can draw trivial emotions. But as a producer, I want to see dynamic animation, so I decided to do a fantasy with a cheerful girl moving around." When asked if he consulted with Takahata or Miyazaki, he said he did not show Miyazaki any storyboards but he did talk to him. They both said the same thing, "be prepared". Yonebayashi announced the voice actors on 13 April 2017.

=== Music ===
Composer Takatsugu Muramatsu, who also scored Yonebayashi's last film When Marnie Was There, is in charge of the soundtrack for Mary and the Witch's Flower. Joshua Messick, one of the world's leading performers of the hammered dulcimer, participated in the score recording.

The theme song is "Rain", performed by Sekai no Owari.

== Release ==
Mary and the Witch's Flower was released theatrically in Japan on July 8, 2017, by distributor Toho, airing on 458 screens across Japan. Altitude Film Sales announced at the Berlin International Film Festival that it had acquired the worldwide rights to the film, and would release it within the UK. Madman Entertainment announced that it had secured the rights to the film within Australia and New Zealand, and would premiere it theatrically at Madman Anime Festival in Melbourne on 5 November 2017, with a wider release on 18 January 2018. GKIDS later announced that it would distribute the film within North America, with a one-week Oscar qualifying run on 1 December 2017, a limited opening on 18 January 2018, and a wider release on January 19, 2018. Altitude (the UK distributor) confirmed in early March 2018 that the film will have a special holding at selected Vue Cinemas on 10 April 2018 before its official UK-wide release on 4 May 2018.

The English dub of Mary and the Witch's Flower (starring Ruby Barnhill, Kate Winslet, Jim Broadbent) was directed by Giles New and produced by Geoffrey Wexler. The English dub was recorded in July and August 2017 in London, and had its premiere in Los Angeles on 23 October 2017 at the GKIDS "Animation is Film" festival.

On 31 August 2018, the first broadcast was performed on NTV's "Friday Road Show!".

=== Home video ===
The movie was released on DVD, Blu-ray, Digital HD and 4K Ultra HD by Walt Disney Japan on March 20, 2018. The film was released on DVD and Blu-ray in North America by GKIDS' main home media distributor Universal Pictures Home Entertainment on May 1, 2018. Madman Entertainment released the film on DVD and Blu-ray in Australia and New Zealand on 4 July 2018. Altitude Film Distribution released the film on DVD, Blu-ray and a Blu-ray Steelbook in the United Kingdom on 10 September 2018.

== Reception ==
=== Box office ===
According to Box Office Mojo, Mary and the Witch's Flower ultimately grossed $2.4 million in the United States and Canada, and $38.8 million in other territories (including $27.6 million in Japan, $3.8 million in South Korea, $3.2 million in China and $2.6 million in France), for a worldwide total of $42.2 million. JPBox-Office reports the film's box office revenue of $41.8 million, while a 2017 list from Motion Picture Producers Association of Japan shows the box-office revenue as ¥32.9 billion (approx. $302,000,000).

In Japan, it opened at second place, grossing ¥428 million ($3.9 million) during its opening weekend—more than Yonebayashi's previous film, When Marnie Was There (2014), which grossed ¥378.86 million in its first weekend.

In the US, it held a special Thursday night preview on 18 January 2018 where it grossed $1.2 million from 573 theaters. It then stayed at 161 theaters over the weekend and grossed $329,097, bringing its four-day gross to $1.5 million.

=== Critical response ===
On the review aggregator website Rotten Tomatoes, 89% of 90 critics' reviews are positive, with an average rating of 6.9/10. The website's consensus reads: "Mary and the Witch's Flower honors its creator's Studio Ghibli roots with a gentle, beautifully animated story whose simplicity is rounded out by its entrancing visuals." Metacritic, which uses a weighted average, assigned the film a score of 74 out of 100, based on 26 critics, indicating "generally favorable" reviews.

Sheila O'Malley of RogerEbert.com gave the film a rating of three stars out of four and stated that "the total lack of inner conflict in Mary might be why Mary and the Witch's Flower—as transportive and entertaining as it is—feels a little slight". Moira Macdonald of The Seattle Times noted that although the film "isn't quite a masterpiece" and "the screenplay needs a polish", she concluded that the film is "a joy to look at: a visual adventure, and a continuation of a remarkable legacy".

== See also ==
- List of films about witchcraft
