= ChaO =

2025 Japanese animated film

- Theatrical release poster
- チャオ
- Directed by: Yasuhiro Aoki
- Written by: Saku Konohana
- Produced by: Eiko Tanaka
- Starring: Ouji Suzuka; Anna Yamada
- Cinematography: Takanori Nakashima
- Edited by: Kengo Shigemura
- Music by: Takatsugu Muramatsu
- Production company: Studio 4°C
- Distributed by: Toei Company, Ltd.
- Release date: August 15, 2025 (Japan)
- Running time: 90 minutes
- Country: Japan
- Language: Japanese

ChaO (Japanese: チャオ, Hepburn: Chao) is a 2025 Japanese animated romantic comedy fantasy film directed by Yasuhiro Aoki. Produced by Studio 4°C and distributed by Toei Company, it premiered in Japan on August 15, 2025. Takatsugu Muramatsu composed the film's music.

== Premise ==
A mermaid princess becomes engaged to a human engineer.

== Voice cast ==
Character	Voice actor
Stefan	Ouji Suzuka
ChaO	Anna Yamada
Roberta	Yūichirō Umehara
Maibei	Kavka Shishido
President Shi	Ryota Yamasato
Ambassador Omede	Cookie!
King Neptunus	Kenta Miyake
Juno	Shunsei Ota
Editor-in-Chief	Anna Tsuchiya

== Production ==
The film is produced by Studio 4°C and directed by Yasuhiro Aoki, with Shōgo Furuya as unit director. Hirokazu Kojima designed the characters and served as chief animation director, and Takatsugu Muramatsu composed the music. Ōji Suzuka and Anna Yamada were cast in the lead roles. The film's theme song is "ChaO!" performed by Koda Kumi.

== Release ==
The film was distributed by Toei Company, who released the film in theaters on August 15, 2025. GKIDS licensed the film for distribution in North America, where it released theatrically on April 10, 2026.

== Reception ==
On the review aggregator website Rotten Tomatoes, 86% of 28 critics' reviews are positive, with an average rating of 6.5/10. Metacritic, which uses a weighted average, assigned the film a score of 67 out of 100, based on five critics, indicating "generally favorable" reviews.

Simon Abrams of RogerEbert.com gave the film three and a half out of four stars and wrote that it "is a real pleasure to watch and listen to".
