= Rosana Sullivan =

American filmmaker

- Born: Charleston, South Carolina, U.S.
- Occupations: Film director; screenwriter; storyboard artist
- Years active: 2011–present
- Employer: Pixar Animation Studios (2011–2025)

Rosana Sullivan is an American filmmaker and storyboard artist, best known for her work at Pixar Animation Studios. She wrote and directed her first animated short film, Kitbull (2019), for which she received a nomination for the Academy Award for Best Animated Short Film at the 92nd Academy Awards.

== Early life and education ==
Rosana Sullivan was born in Charleston, South Carolina, and grew up in Texas. She has one brother. When she was in high school at age 16, her father, a university professor of biology, accepted a new job at the University of San Francisco and the family relocated to the San Francisco Bay Area.

Sullivan initially studied for a career as a veterinarian, enrolling at the University of San Francisco as a biology major. In her junior year, she took a course in portrait painting to satisfy an art credit and realized that art was her real calling. She spent her senior year at USF in the fine arts program, graduating in 2007, and then attended the Academy of Art University in San Francisco, graduating in 2010.

== Career ==
Sullivan worked as a lead character designer at Ooga Labs and a 2D artist at Kabam before joining Pixar Animation Studios in 2011. With Pixar, she contributed to the 3D animated films Monsters University (2013), The Good Dinosaur (2015), Piper (2016), and Incredibles 2 (2018). She was nominated for a 2015 Annie Award for outstanding achievement in storyboarding in an animated feature production for her work on The Good Dinosaur. In February 2019, she wrote and directed her first animated film, a nine-minute traditionally animated short called Kitbull, which is part of the SparkShorts series.

In April 2019, Sullivan published an autobiographical picture book, Mommy Sayang, describing the life of a girl and her mother in a Malaysian village. This story, along with others that she has written, was inspired by her mother's roots in Malaysia.

In January 2021, it was announced that Sullivan began developing a feature film for Pixar.

== Filmography ==
=== Short films ===
Year	Title	Credited as		
Year	Title	Director	Storyboard artist	Writer
2009	Long Shadows	No	Yes	No
2016	Piper	No	Yes	No
2019	Kitbull	Yes	Yes	Yes
2020	Loop	No	No	Story Trust

=== Feature films ===
Year	Title	Credited as	
Year	Title	Storyboard artist	Executive producer
2013	Monsters University	Yes	No
2015	The Good Dinosaur	Yes	No
2018	Incredibles 2	Yes	No
2019	Toy Story 4	No	Associate
2020	Onward	Yes	No
2020	Soul	Yes	No
2022	Turning Red	Story supervisor	No

== Accolades ==
Accolades received by Rosana Sullivan
Award	Date	Category	Nominated work	Result	Ref(s)
Academy Awards	February 9, 2020	Best Animated Short Film	Kitbull	Nominated	
Annie Awards	February 6, 2016	Outstanding Achievement for Storyboarding in a Feature Production	The Good Dinosaur	Nominated	
Humanitas Prize	January 24, 2020	Humanitas Prize for Short Film	Kitbull	Won	

== Bibliography ==
- Mommy Sayang. Disney Press. 2019. ISBN 9781368015905.
