= The Tale of the Princess Kaguya (film) =

2013 Japanese animated fantasy film

- Theatrical release poster
- Japanese: かぐや姫の物語
- Revised Hepburn: Kaguya-hime no Monogatari
- Directed by: Isao Takahata
- Screenplay by: Isao Takahata; Riko Sakaguchi
- Based on: The Tale of the Bamboo Cutter
- Produced by: Yoshiaki Nishimura
- Starring: Aki Asakura; Kengo Kora; Takeo Chii; Nobuko Miyamoto
- Cinematography: Keisuke Nakamura
- Edited by: Toshihiko Kojima
- Music by: Joe Hisaishi
- Production company: Studio Ghibli
- Distributed by: Toho
- Release date: 23 November 2013
- Running time: 137 minutes
- Country: Japan
- Language: Japanese
- Budget: ¥5.15 billion ($49.3 million)
- Box office: $27 million

The Tale of the Princess Kaguya (Japanese: かぐや姫の物語, Hepburn: Kaguya-hime no Monogatari) is a 2013 Japanese animated historical fantasy drama film directed by Isao Takahata from a screenplay he co-wrote with Riko Sakaguchi. Based on The Tale of the Bamboo Cutter, a 10th-century Japanese literary tale, the film follows a bamboo cutter who works with his wife, whose life changes when he meets a living nymph that turns into a beautiful young woman. Themes of feminism, freedom, social alienation, impermanence, and responsibility are explored throughout.

It was produced by Studio Ghibli for Nippon Television Network, Dentsu, Hakuhodo DYMP, Walt Disney Japan, Mitsubishi, Toho and KDDI. The film's ensemble voice cast featured Aki Asakura, Kengo Kora, Takeo Chii, Nobuko Miyamoto, Atsuko Takahata, Tomoko Tabata, Tatekawa Shinosuke, Takaya Kamikawa, Hikaru Ijūin, Ryudo Uzaki, Nakamura Shichinosuke II, Isao Hashizume, Yukiji Asaoka (in a special appearance) and Tatsuya Nakadai. It is the final film to feature Chii, who died in June 2012, (Note: Yuji Miyake recorded additional dialogue for the bamboo cutter following Takeo Chii's death.) and also the final film to be directed by Takahata, who died in April 2018.

The Tale of the Princess Kaguya was released in Japan on 23 November 2013 by Toho. With a budget of US$49.3 million, it was the most expensive Japanese film. It received critical acclaim and was nominated for the Best Animated Feature at the 87th Academy Awards. Its production was the subject of the feature-length documentary Isao Takahata and His Tale of the Princess Kaguya.

== Plot ==
A bamboo cutter discovers a small scale girl inside a glowing bamboo shoot. Believing her to be a divine presence, he and his wife decide to raise her as their own, calling her "Princess". The girl grows rapidly, earning her the nickname "Takenoko" (タケノコ; "Little Bamboo") from the village children. Sutemaru (捨丸), the oldest among Takenoko's friends, develops a close relationship with her.

The bamboo cutter comes upon gold and fine cloth in the bamboo grove the same way he found the Princess. He takes these as proof of her divine royalty and begins planning to make her a "noble princess". He relocates the family to the capital, forcing the girl to leave her friends behind, and the family moves into a mansion replete with servants. The girl is saddled with a governess who is tasked with taming her into a noblewoman. The girl struggles with the restraints of nobility, yearning for her prior life in the countryside.

When she comes of age, she is granted the formal name "Princess Kaguya" (かぐや姫; "The Shining Princess"). The bamboo cutter holds a celebration, where Kaguya overhears partygoers ridiculing his attempts to turn a peasant girl into a noble through money. Kaguya flees the capital in despair and runs back to the mountains, seeking Sutemaru and her friends, but discovers that they have all moved away. She passes out in the snow and awakens back at the party.

Kaguya grows in beauty, attracting suitors. Five noblemen attempt to court her, comparing her to mythical treasures. Kaguya tells them she will only marry whoever can bring her the mythical treasure mentioned. As spring arrives, the Princess wishes to see the cherry blossoms bloom. Her mother and a handmaiden take her back to the country where a blooming tree stands not far from her old hut. Reveling in its bursting forth with life, she happily whirls amid its petals but stumbles into a child. The child's family beg for her forgiveness and leave, reminding Kaguya of her new identity and status.

Returning to the capital, the cart the group is in finds itself stuck, when a ruckus is heard outside. Kaguya notices several men running through the streets, and upon seeing one of them, recognizes Sutemaru, who is stealing a chicken. Unable to contain herself, she cries out to him, but upon realizing her station in life, quickly retreats into the carriage as it drives off. Sutemaru attempts to go after her, but is beaten by those pursuing him, as Kaguya cries.

Two suitors attempt to persuade her with counterfeits, the third abandons his quest, and the fourth gives Kaguya a flower instead of his treasure, but is found by his wife before Kaguya can accept. When the last suitor dies in his quest, Kaguya becomes depressed. The Emperor of Japan takes notice of Kaguya's beauty and tries to forcefully bring her to his palace but she convinces him to leave.

Kaguya reveals to her parents her origin. Once a resident of the Moon, she broke its laws, hoping to be exiled to Earth so that she could experience mortal life. When the Emperor made his advances, she silently begged the Moon to help her. Having heard her prayer, the Moon restored her memories and promised reclamation at the next full moon. Kaguya expresses her attachment to Earth and her reluctance to leave; the bamboo cutter swears to protect her and begins turning the mansion into a fortress.

Kaguya returns to her home village and finds Sutemaru. The two profess their love, and in their joy, they fly over the countryside, only to encounter the Moon and fall. Sutemaru wakes up alone and reunites with his wife and child, interpreting the experience as a dream.

On the night of the full moon, a procession of celestial beings led by the Buddha descends from the Moon, and the fortress is unable to stop it. An attendant offers Kaguya the robe that will erase her memories of Earth. She embraces her family one last time before the robe embraces her. They leave, and the bamboo cutter and his wife are distraught. As Kaguya looks back at Earth, tears fill her eyes.

== Voice cast ==
Character	Japanese cast	English dub cast
The Princess Kaguya	Aki Asakura Mirai Uchida (young)	Chloë Grace Moretz Caitlyn Leone (young)
Sutemaru	Kengo Kora	Darren Criss
The Bamboo Cutter	Takeo Chii	James Caan
The Bamboo Cutter's Wife / The Narrator	Nobuko Miyamoto	Mary Steenburgen
Lady Sagami	Atsuko Takahata	Lucy Liu
Me no Warawa	Tomoko Tabata	Hynden Walch
Inbe no Akita	Tatekawa Shinosuke	George Segal
Prince Ishitsukuri	Takaya Kamikawa	James Marsden
Lord Minister of the Right Abe	Hikaru Ijūin	Oliver Platt
Great Counselor Otomo	Ryudo Uzaki	Daniel Dae Kim
The Mikado	Nakamura Shichinosuke II	Dean Cain
Prince Kuramochi	Isao Hashizume	Beau Bridges
Middle Counselor Isonokami	Tamaki Kojo	John Cho
Kita no Kata	Yukiji Asaoka	Emily Bridges
Sumiyaki no Roujini	Tatsuya Nakadai	

== Production ==
As a child, Takahata read The Tale of the Bamboo Cutter. He recalled that he struggled to relate and sympathize with the protagonist; to him, the "heroine's transformation was enigmatic" and that it "didn't evoke any empathy from [him]". In 1960, Takahata was preparing for a potential adaptation for his employer Toei Animation, which eventually was abandoned. After rereading the tale, he realized the story's potential to be entertaining, as long as an adaptation allowed the audience to understand how Princess Kaguya felt.

Studio Ghibli revealed that Isao Takahata was working on a feature-length film in 2008. Takahata announced at the 62nd Locarno International Film Festival in 2009 that he intended to direct a film based on the anonymous Japanese literary tale The Tale of the Bamboo Cutter.

The Tale of the Princess Kaguya was financed by Nippon TV, whose late chairman, Seiichiro Ujiie, gave ¥5 billion (approximately $40 million) towards the project. Ujiie loved Takahata's work, and pleaded with Ghibli producer Toshio Suzuki to let Takahata make one more film. Ujiie died on 3 March 2011, but not before being able to view the script and some of the storyboards.

To make sure the audience emotionally connected with the film, it was important to Takahata that viewers were able to "imagine or recall the reality deep within the drawings", rather than be distracted by a realistic art style. He wanted to have people "recollect the realities of this life by sketching ordinary human qualities with simple props". To assist with this vision, Osamu Tanabe provided the character designs and animation, and Kazuo Oga drew the watercolor backgrounds.

The film uses more experimental animation aesthetics where "imperfections" remain in the image (such as stray pencil lines or color bleed). Takahata cited experimental French Canadian animator Frédéric Back as an influence on the film, as well as My Neighbors the Yamadas.

The release of The Tale of the Princess Kaguya was finally confirmed by Studio Ghibli and distributor Toho on 13 December 2012.

== Themes ==
=== Feminism ===
The Tale of the Princess Kaguya has been noted for its feminist themes. Kaguya's move to the capital and her father's insistence that she adopt the life of a noblewoman run counter to her wishes, while her mother's limited role in decision-making highlights the lack of female agency in the household. Yalcinkaya points to a dream sequence in which Kaguya breaks through a series of doors as a metaphor for the barriers imposed by family and society.

The film also critiques ideals of beauty and propriety during the Heian period. According to Monji, Kaguya's training in court etiquette, which required her to suppress her emotions, amounts to a painful renunciation of humanity. Her decision to set impossible tasks for her suitors has further been read as a depiction of female resistance within a male-dominated hierarchy.

=== Nature and freedom ===
The contrast between rural life and the palace is a central motif. The countryside is shown through muted colors and soft lines that emphasize simplicity and joy, while the capital is rendered with bolder hues suggesting indulgence and confinement. In one sequence, Kaguya flees the palace in a style animated with rapid, unrestrained brushstrokes, visually expressing her frustration and despair. She observes that her vitality fades as the story progresses, culminating in a scene where she overhears men mocking her origins; her shrinking figure against a backdrop of darkness underscores her sense of isolation.

Both rural and aristocratic life are portrayed as tragic: peasants are constrained by poverty, while aristocrats are bound by the rigidity of class expectations.

=== Life, suffering and responsibility ===
The ending frames earthly life as inseparable from grief but also from beauty. The deities who descend to return Kaguya to the Moon are depicted in bright hues and accompanied by joyful music, contrasting with the darker tones of Earth and the sorrow of her family. She interprets this juxtaposition as suggesting that, despite suffering, earthly existence holds wonder and meaning; a point Kaguya affirms before her departure.

The film also draws on the concept of mono no aware, the fleeting beauty of existence. The figure who arrives to take Kaguya back to the Moon resembles a Buddha accompanied by heavenly attendants, evoking the Pure Land tradition in which practitioners believe they are guided to a realm of peace after death. The Moon, which Kaguya recalls as a place free from earthly pain and longing, parallels this vision of divine solitude. Her return can thus be interpreted as a metaphor for death and the impermanence of human life.

The film also reflects on adulthood and responsibility. Monji reads Kaguya's reluctant acceptance of her social duties as an allegory for the necessity of living within society's restrictions. This theme extends to her adoptive parents, whose actions, though sometimes misguided, are framed as motivated by love and duty toward their daughter.

== Soundtrack ==
In 2012, Shin-ichiro Ikebe was announced to write the film's score. However, in 2013, Joe Hisaishi replaced Ikebe as the composer. This would be the only time Hisaishi scored a film directed by Isao Takahata. The theme song "When I Remember This Life" was written and performed by Nikaido Kazumi. The music from the film's original soundtrack was released on 20 November 2013.

All tracks are written by Joe Hisaishi, except where noted.

No.	Title	Length
1.	"Overture"	0:53
2.	"Light"	0:22
3.	"The Little Princess"	1:15
4.	"The Joy of Living"	1:01
5.	"The Sprout"	2:19
6.	"Li'l Bamboo"	2:06
7.	"Life"	0:59
8.	"Mountain Hamlet"	1:53
9.	"Robe"	0:34
10.	"Setting Out"	1:19
11.	"Autumn Harvest"	0:39
12.	"Supple Bamboo"	1:22
13.	"Writing Practice"	0:47
14.	"The Garden of Life"	0:25
15.	"The Banquet"	1:22
16.	"Despair"	1:07
17.	"The Coming of Spring"	1:03
18.	"Melody of the Beautiful Koto"	0:34
19.	"Spring Waltz"	2:02
20.	"Memories of the Village"	1:36
21.	"The Nobles' Wild Ride"	1:29
22.	"Devotion"	1:28
23.	"Cicada Night"	1:12
24.	"Mystery of the Moon"	0:48
25.	"Sorrow"	1:00
26.	"Fate"	1:17
27.	"The City of the Moon"	0:28
28.	"Going Home"	1:19
29.	"Flying"	4:26
30.	"The Procession of Celestial Beings I"	2:28
31.	"The Parting"	1:07
32.	"The Procession of Celestial Beings II"	0:57
33.	"Moon"	1:49
34.	"When I Remember This Life" (Written and performed by Nikaido Kazumi)	5:42
35.	"Koto Melody"	0:57
36.	"Nursery Rhyme"	0:48
37.	"Song of the Heavenly Maiden"	1:34

== Release ==
The Tale of The Princess Kaguya was initially announced to be released simultaneously with The Wind Rises, another Ghibli film by Hayao Miyazaki in Japan in the summer of 2013, which would have marked the first time that the works of the two directors were released together since the release of the films My Neighbor Totoro and Grave of the Fireflies in 1988. However, in February 2013, distributor Toho announced that the release of The Princess Kaguya would be delayed to 23 November 2013, citing concerns that the storyboards were not yet complete. On 12 March 2014, independent distributor GKIDS announced that it had acquired the US rights for the film and that it would release an English dub version produced by Studio Ghibli and Frank Marshall. Chloë Grace Moretz is the voice of the title character in the English dub. It was released in select theaters in North America on 17 October 2014 and was also released on DVD and Blu-ray on 17 February 2015. The film was selected to be screened as part of the Directors' Fortnight section of the 2014 Cannes Film Festival. Its North American première took place at the 2014 Toronto International Film Festival during the festival's "Masters" program.

== Reception ==
=== Box office ===
The film debuted at first place during its opening weekend in Japan, grossing ¥284 million ($2.8 million). By 2 February 2014, it had grossed ¥2,313,602,733 ($22,613,153) at the Japanese box office. It subsequently grossed ¥2.47 billion ($25.31 million) in Japan, where it was the eleventh top-grossing Japanese film of 2014.

It grossed $703,232 in North America and $969,920 in other countries, for a worldwide total of $27.02 million.

=== Home media ===
The Tale of the Princess Kaguya was released in Japan on DVD and Blu-ray by Walt Disney Studios Japan on 3 December 2014. The Blu-ray sold 13,784 units as of January 2015. The DVD release sold 8,208 units by 7 December 2014 and a further 15,718 units between 8 December 2014 and 7 June 2015, for a combined 23,926 DVD units and at least 37,710 physical home video units sold in Japan as of 2015.

In North America, the film was released on DVD, Blu-ray and digital download by Universal Pictures Home Entertainment on 17 February 2015. The DVD and Blu-ray releases grossed $3.42 million in physical sales, as of April 2022. In the United Kingdom, it was 2015's second best-selling foreign-language film on home video, below Indonesian action film The Raid 2.

=== Critical reception ===
The film received critical acclaim. On the review aggregator website Rotten Tomatoes, 100% of 95 critics' reviews are positive, with an average rating of 8.3/10. The website's consensus reads: "Boasting narrative depth, frank honesty, and exquisite visual beauty, The Tale of the Princess Kaguya is a modern animated treasure with timeless appeal." It was the first film of the 2010s to receive an approval rating of 100% on the website, making it one of the highest-rated films of the decade. Metacritic, which uses a weighted average, assigned the film a score of 89 out of 100, based on 28 critics, indicating "universal acclaim".

In February 2014, The Tale of the Princess Kaguya placed 4th in both Kinema Junpo's Best Ten and their Reader's Choice Awards. David Ehrlich of The A.V. Club gave the film an A, deeming it "the best animated movie of the year", adding that it is "destined to be remembered as one of the revered Studio Ghibli's finest achievements." Nicolas Rapold of The New York Times praised the artwork calling it "exquisitely drawn with both watercolor delicacy and a brisk sense of line". For IndieWire's 2018 list of the best Japanese films of the 21st century, Carlos Aguilar expressed agreement with the common view that Spirited Away is the greatest, but still chose The Tale of the Princess Kaguya for the list and referred to the latter as "a work of nearly identical caliber ... an artistic triumph that delights with exuberant handcraft where each pencil stroke comes alive on screen. Takahata made something at once pastoral, timeless, and epic in proportion with an emotional depth rarely seen in films – animated or not."

In July 2025, it was one of the films voted for the "Readers' Choice" edition of The New York Times' list of "The 100 Best Movies of the 21st Century," finishing at number 279.

=== Accolades ===
Year	Award	Category	Recipients and nominees	Results
2013	64th Blue Ribbon Award	Best Film		Nominated
2013	64th Blue Ribbon Award	Best Director	Isao Takahata	Nominated
2013	68th Mainichi Film Awards	Animation Film Award		Won
2014	8th Asia Pacific Screen Award	Best Animated Feature Film	Yoshiaki Nishimura	Won
2014	37th Japan Academy Prize	Japan Academy Prize for Animation of the Year		Nominated
2014	37th Japan Academy Prize	Outstanding Achievement in Music	Joe Hisaishi	Nominated
2014	Kinema Junpo Awards	Best Film		Nominated
2014	67th Cannes Film Festival	Art Cinema Award (Directors' Fortnight)	Isao Takahata	Nominated
2014	67th Cannes Film Festival	Prix SACD (Directors' Fortnight)	Isao Takahata	Nominated
2014	Fantastic Fest	Audience Award		Won
2014	62nd San Sebastián International Film Festival	Audience Award		Nominated
2014	39th Toronto International Film Festival	People's Choice Award for Best Drama Feature Film		Nominated
2014	47th Sitges Film Festival	Best Animated Feature		Nominated
2014	36th Mill Valley Film Festival	Audience Award for Best Animated Film		Won
2014	18th Oslo Films from the South Festival	Best Feature		Nominated
2014	35th Boston Society of Film Critics Awards	Best Animated Film	Isao Takahata	Won
2014	40th Los Angeles Film Critics Association Awards	Best Animated Film	Isao Takahata	Won
2014	Chicago Film Critics Association	Best Animated Feature		Nominated
2014	San Francisco Film Critics Circle	Best Animated Feature		Nominated
2014	Toronto Film Critics Association	Best Animated Feature		Won
2014	18th Online Film Critics Society Awards	Best Animated Film		Nominated
2014	18th Online Film Critics Society Awards	Best Foreign Language Film		Nominated
2014	87th Academy Awards	Best Animated Feature Film	Isao Takahata, Yoshiaki Nishimura	Nominated
2015	42nd Annual Annie Awards	Best Animated Feature		Nominated
2015	42nd Annual Annie Awards	Directing in an Animated Feature Production	Isao Takahata	Nominated
2015	42nd Annual Annie Awards	Music in a Feature Production	Joe Hisaishi	Nominated
2016	21st Empire Awards	Best Animated Film		Nominated

== See also ==
- The Kingdom of Dreams and Madness, a 2013 documentary about the making of the film
- List of films directed by Isao Takahata
- Princess from the Moon, a 1987 major live-action film based on The Tale of the Bamboo Cutter
- List of films with a 100% rating on Rotten Tomatoes
