= The Kingdom of Dreams and Madness =

2013 documentary film about Studio Ghibli

- Promotional release poster

Japanese name
- Kanji: 夢と狂気の王国
Transcriptions
- Revised Hepburn: Yume to kyôki no ôkoku
- Directed by: Mami Sunada
- Written by: Mami Sunada
- Produced by: Nobuo Kawakami
- Starring: Hayao Miyazaki; Toshio Suzuki; Isao Takahata; Hideaki Anno
- Cinematography: Mami Sunada
- Edited by: Mami Sunada
- Music by: Masakatsu Takagi
- Production company: Dwango
- Distributed by: Toho
- Release dates: November 16, 2013 (Japan); November 1, 2014 (HIFF)
- Running time: 118 minutes
- Country: Japan
- Language: Japanese

The Kingdom of Dreams and Madness (Japanese: 夢と狂気の王国, Hepburn: Yume to kyōki no ōkoku) is a 2013 Japanese documentary film directed by Mami Sunada. The film follows the routines of those employed at Studio Ghibli, including filmmakers Hayao Miyazaki, Isao Takahata, and Toshio Suzuki as they work to release two films simultaneously, The Wind Rises and The Tale of the Princess Kaguya.

== Synopsis ==
The documentary delves into the life of Hayao Miyazaki and the productions of the animated films The Wind Rises and The Tale of the Princess Kaguya, including various footage of said productions. The footage shown includes the choosing of Hideaki Anno as the voice actor for the character Jiro Horikoshi in The Wind Rises as well as the extensive and detailed amount of storyboarding sketched, inked, and painted by Miyazaki. It notes Miyazaki's opinions on subjects such as the Fukushima Daiichi nuclear disaster and Zero planes, and shows his tensions with some of the other staff, including Isao Takahata, and his memories of his father. The film illustrates the importance of Miyazaki, Takahata, and Toshio Suzuki's works altogether to help Studio Ghibli be successful, and concludes with mention of Miyazaki's supposed official retirement.

== Release ==
On 1 November 2014, the documentary was screened at the Hawaii International Film Festival. In March 2015, it was added to the Netflix streaming service.

In Japan, Walt Disney Studios Japan released the documentary on Blu-ray on 21 May 2014 under the distributor's "Ghibli ga Ippai Collection SPECIAL" label.

In the United States, Cinedigm and GKIDS released it on DVD on 27 January 2015.

== Reception ==
The film received positive reviews from critics. The film holds a 92% approval rating from 24 reviews on review aggregator Rotten Tomatoes, with an average rating of 7.2 out of 10. The website's critics consensus reads: "The Kingdom of Dreams and Madness is a captivating treat for Studio Ghibli fans -- and may prove nearly as entertaining and enlightening for the unconverted." Sam Byford of The Verge stated that the film "should be considered essential viewing for any Studio Ghibli fan, for whom it will stand alone as a captivating work in its own right". David Ehrlich of The A.V. Club expressed that it held an "emotional wallop that's almost on par with anything found in one of Miyazaki's or Takahata's films", calling it "a delicate depiction of the artistic spirit".

Brian Tallerico of RogerEbert.com gave the documentary three out of four possible stars, saying that director Sunada "captures something poetic about art and creativity that could speak to anyone, animation fan or otherwise". Peter Debruge of the website Variety said that the "atmosphere inside Studio Ghibli may suggest a zen-like idyll, but animation is a painstaking – and sometimes painful – process", and that Sunada "makes us appreciate the magic all the more".
