= When Marnie Was There (film) =

2014 Japanese animated film directed by Hiromasa Yonebayashi

- Theatrical release poster

Japanese name
- Kanji: 思い出のマーニー
- Literal meaning: Marnie of [my] Memories
Transcriptions
- Revised Hepburn: Omoide no Mānī
- Directed by: Hiromasa Yonebayashi
- Screenplay by: Masashi Andō; Keiko Niwa; Hiromasa Yonebayashi
- Based on: When Marnie Was There by Joan G. Robinson
- Produced by: Yoshiaki Nishimura
- Starring: Sara Takatsuki; Kasumi Arimura; Hana Sugisaki; Hitomi Kuroki; Ryoko Moriyama
- Cinematography: Atsushi Okui
- Edited by: Rie Matsubara; Takeshi Seyama
- Music by: Takatsugu Muramatsu
- Production company: Studio Ghibli
- Distributed by: Toho
- Release date: 19 July 2014
- Running time: 103 minutes
- Country: Japan
- Language: Japanese
- Budget: ¥1.15 billion ($10.5 million)
- Box office: ¥3.85 billion ($36 million)

When Marnie Was There (Japanese: 思い出のマーニー, Hepburn: Omoide no Mānī; lit. 'Marnie of [My] Memories') is a 2014 Japanese animated psychological drama film co-written and directed by Hiromasa Yonebayashi, produced by Studio Ghibli and distributed by Toho. It is based on Joan G. Robinson's 1967 novel When Marnie Was There. The film stars Sara Takatsuki, Kasumi Arimura, Hana Sugisaki, Hitomi Kuroki, and Ryoko Moriyama.

In When Marnie Was There, Anna Sasaki stays with her relatives in a town in the Kushiro wetlands in Hokkaido. Anna comes across a nearby abandoned mansion, where she meets Marnie, a mysterious girl who asks her to promise to keep their secrets from everyone. As summer progresses, Anna spends more time with Marnie and learns the truth about her family and adoption.

The film featured the final work for Studio Ghibli animator Makiko Futaki, who died in May 2016. It was also the final film that Yonebayashi directed for Ghibli before he left and joined Studio Ponoc. The film received positive reviews from critics, who praised its animation, music, vocal performances, and emotional story. It was released in theaters on 19 July 2014, and on Blu-ray and DVD in Japan on 18 March 2015. It was nominated for the Academy Award for Best Animated Feature and Japan Academy Film Prize for Animation of the Year.

== Plot ==
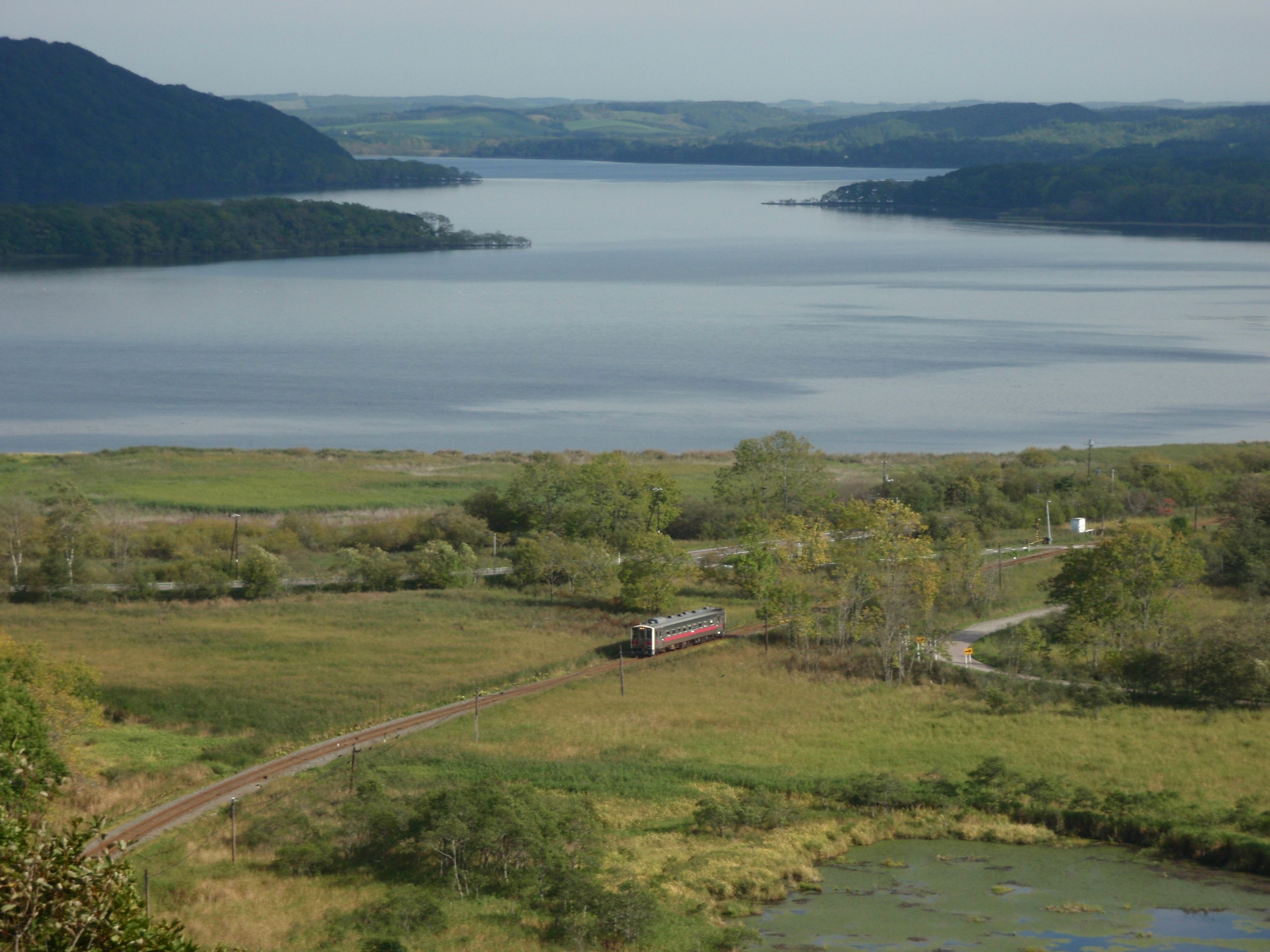
The Kushiro Wetlands in Hokkaido, Japan

Anna Sasaki is a 12-year-old girl with low self-esteem living in Sapporo with her foster parents, Yoriko and her husband. One day, Anna suffers an asthma attack at school. At the doctor's recommendation to send Anna to a place where the air is clean, Yoriko decides to have her spend summer break with Yoriko's relatives, Setsu and Kiyomasa Oiwa, who live in a rural seaside town located between Kushiro and Nemuro.

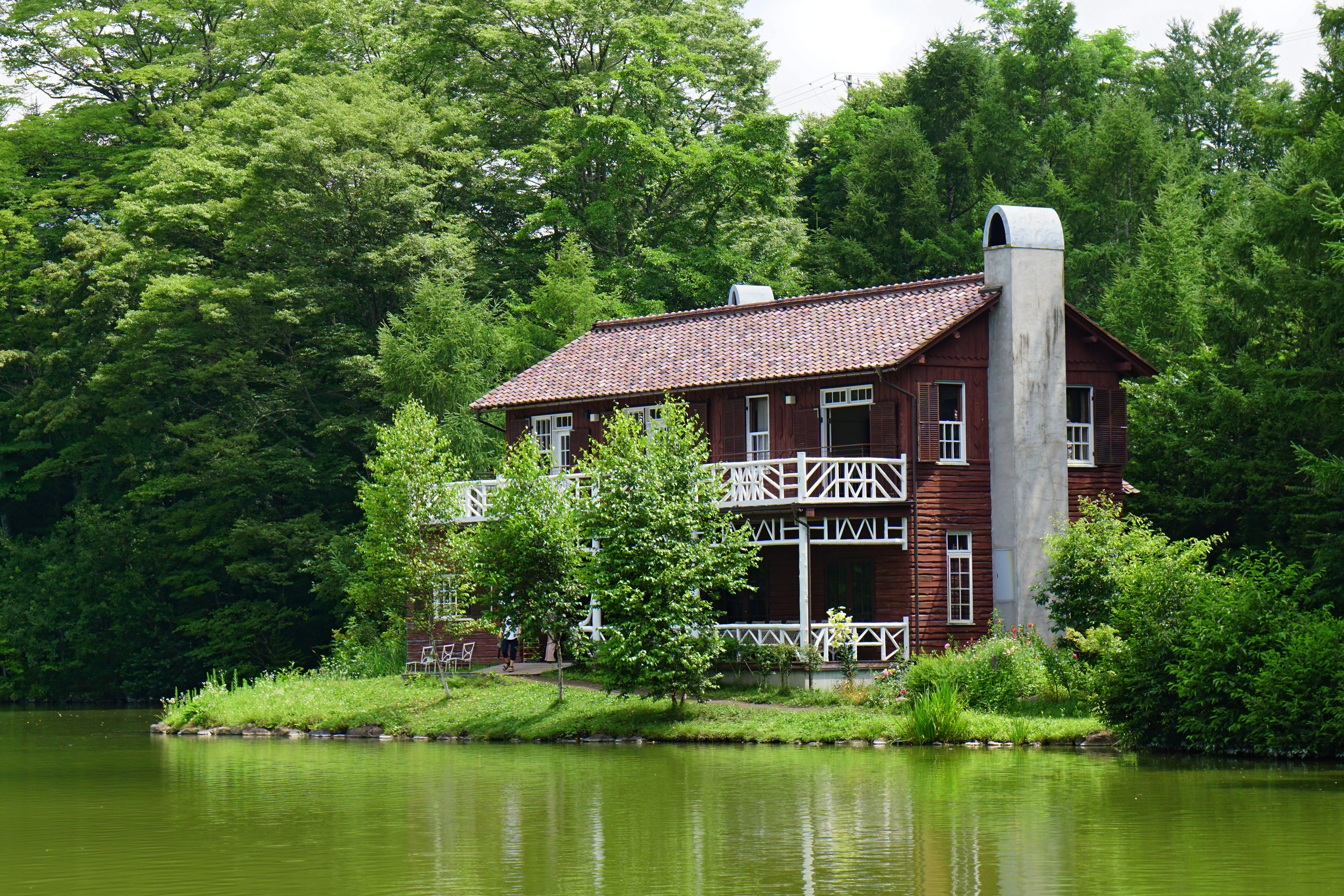
A villa in Karuizawa, Nagano, on which the "Marsh House" is based

Anna investigates an abandoned mansion across a salt marsh. She recognizes it, but the tide ensnares her and keeps her there until Toichi, an elderly fisherman, finds her. Anna sees a blonde-haired girl in the mansion. On the night of the Tanabata festival, she meets the girl, Marnie. The two agree to keep their meetings secret. Marnie invites Anna to a party at the mansion, where she sees Marnie dancing with a boy named Kazuhiko. Anna sketches Marnie while there.

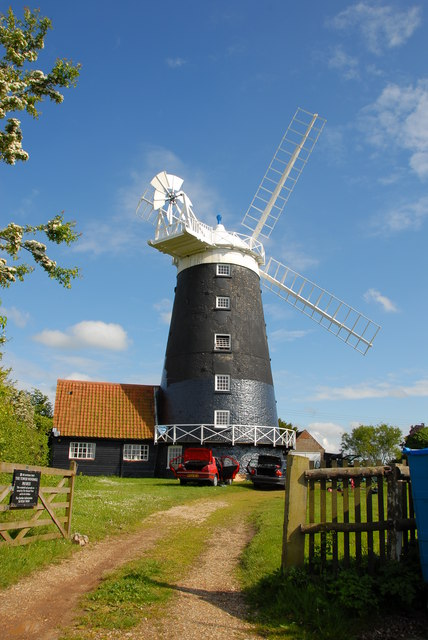
The old silo that appears in the film is based on Burnham Overy Staithe Windmill in Norfolk.

Anna meets Hisako, an older woman who paints. Hisako comments that Anna's sketches look like Marnie, whom she knew when she was young. A family moves into the mansion. During the move-in, Anna meets a girl named Sayaka, who gives her Marnie's diary that had been hidden in a drawer. Anna tells Marnie she found documents showing her foster parents are paid to care for her. She assumes that they only pretend to love her for the money and says she cannot forgive her biological family for leaving her behind and dying. Marnie shares how her parents are always traveling abroad, and how she is left behind with her cruel nanny. The maids bully her and threaten to lock her in the silo near the mansion. Anna leads Marnie to the silo to confront the latter's fear of it. Marnie conquers her fear, but begins referring to Anna as Kazuhiko. As a storm hits, Anna dreams of Marnie leaving and wakes up to discover her gone.

Sayaka finds the missing pages from Marnie's diary, which include passages about Kazuhiko and the silo. She and her brother find Anna unconscious with a high fever. They bring her back to the Oiwas, where Anna confronts Marnie, intending not to forgive her for leaving her in the silo. Marnie says she is sorry for leaving her and she cannot see Anna anymore. Before they part, Anna tells Marnie that she loves her and forgives her.

When Anna recovers, Hisako reveals Marnie's story: Marnie married Kazuhiko and had a daughter named Emily. Kazuhiko died from a sudden illness and Marnie committed herself to a sanatorium to cope with her loss. With no other family to care for her, Emily was sent to a boarding school. Marnie recovered, but as a preteen, Emily was resentful for her mother abandoning her. In her adulthood, Emily ran away from home to get married and had a daughter herself, but she and her husband were killed in a car accident when their daughter was just a baby. Marnie raised her granddaughter, who was placed in foster care after her death.

At the end of the summer, Yoriko arrives to take Anna home and is delighted to see Anna with her new friends, Hisako, Toichi, and Sayaka. She gives Anna a photograph of the mansion and says it belonged to Anna's grandmother. When Anna sees Marnie's name written on the back, she realizes that she is Emily's daughter and Marnie's granddaughter, and knew so much of Marnie's story because she had heard it as a baby. This revelation brings closure to her identity. Yoriko tells Anna about the government payments but reassures her they have always loved her. For the first time, Anna calls Yoriko her mother.

Anna says goodbye to her new friends and promises to visit again next summer. While driving away, she sees Marnie at the mansion window, waving goodbye to her.

== Voice cast ==
Character	Japanese cast	English dub cast
Anna Sasaki	Sara Takatsuki	Hailee Steinfeld
Marnie	Kasumi Arimura^{Y} Ryoko Moriyama^{O}	Taylor Autumn Bertman^{Y} Kiernan Shipka^{T} Catherine O'Hara^{O}
Sayaka	Hana Sugisaki	Ava Acres
Hisako	Hitomi Kuroki	Vanessa Williams Mila Brener^{Y}
Yoriko Sasaki	Nanako Matsushima	Geena Davis
Kiyomasa Oiwa	Susumu Terajima	John C. Reilly
Setsu Oiwa	Toshie Negishi	Grey Griffin
Nanny	Kazuko Yoshiyuki	Ellen Burstyn
Tōichi	Ken Yasuda (TEAM NACS)	Fred Tatasciore
Mrs Kadoya	—N/a	Kathy Bates
Nobuko Kadoya	Akiko Yoritsune	Raini Rodriguez
Doctor Yamashita	Yo Oizumi (TEAM NACS)	Bob Bergen
Neighborhood Association Officer	Takuma Otoo (TEAM NACS)	—N/a
Art Teacher	Hiroyuki Morisaki (TEAM NACS)	—N/a
Gentleman	Shigeyuki Totsugi (TEAM NACS)	—N/a
Emily	Renge Ishiyama	Ashley Johnson
Kazuhiko	Junya Hirano	James Sie
Takeshi	—N/a	Mikey Kelley

== Production ==
The original novel by Joan G. Robinson had previously been cited by Hayao Miyazaki as one of his favorite children's novels. Hiromasa Yonebayashi was assigned the project by Ghibli producer Toshio Suzuki, who asked him to change the setting of the story to Japan. Yonebayashi found the story moving, but he "thought it would be very difficult to visualize as a film," and initially turned down the role. His interest was later renewed and he began to conceive new elements for the story, such as Anna's characterization as an artist. Although the setting was changed, the decision was made to retain Marnie's appearance as blonde and blue-eyed, though Miyazaki was opposed to this decision. According to Ghibli producer Yoshiaki Nishimura, Miyazaki judged the usage of Marnie's character "plain outdated and cheesy" to promote the film, although Nishimura clarified that catching people's attention with her appearance never had been their intention.

Yonebayashi intended the film to be encouraging to children in Japan who felt lonely and isolated, and hoped that "when they see Marnie, maybe they could take a little step forward". Key focus was placed upon highly detailed character movements and backgrounds, as well as depicting the details of Anna's experience in the environment. The Marsh House that is central to the story was designed by Yohei Taneda, who Yonebayashi asked "to draw the Marsh House as if it were another character who watches over Anna." Taneda scouted buildings in Hokkaido for inspiration.

== Music ==
When Marnie Was There Soundtrack Music Collection

Soundtrack album by Takatsugu Muramatsu
- Released: 16 July 2014
- Genre: Soundtrack
- Length: 1:11:18
- Labels: Studio Ghibli Records; Tokuma Japan Communications

Singles from When Marnie Was There Soundtrack Music Collection
- 1. "Fine on the Outside" Released: 2 July 2014

When Marnie Was There Soundtrack Music Collection, known as Omoide no Marnie Santora Ongaku Shuu (思い出のマーニーサントラ音楽集) in Japan, is a two-disc soundtrack and image song album that was released on CD in Japan and in 113 countries worldwide (including Japan) as a digital download on the iTunes Store on 16 July 2014. The first "Image Song" disc features music composed to express the personality of the characters and feel of places in the film. The second disc features all the background music for the film. Priscilla Ahn, the writer and performer of the movie's theme song, "Fine on the Outside", also released an accompanying album to the film called Just Know That I Love You on 16 July 2014.

== Release ==
When Marnie Was There was released in Japan on July 19, 2014. On 14 January, GKIDS announced that they would be distributing the film for a North American release on May 22, 2015. The film premièred at the New York International Children's Film Festival on 27 February 2015. The film had its UK premiere during the BFI London Film Festival on 10 October 2015 with a wider release scheduled for 10 June 2016.

The film was released on Blu-ray and DVD in Japan by Walt Disney Studios Japan on 18 March 2015, and in North America by Universal Pictures Home Entertainment on October 6, 2015.

== Reception ==
=== Box office ===
When Marnie Was There opened at third place, grossing ¥379 million during its opening weekend in Japan. By its fourth weekend, it had earned ¥2.08 billion, made an additional ¥930 million in its next two weekends, and had a total of ¥3.363 billion by its eighth weekend. By the end of 2014, the film had grossed ¥3.53 billion ($33,319,244) in Japan.

Overseas, the film sold 114,679 tickets in France, equivalent to approximately €743,120 ($878,888) in 2015. In North America, the film had grossed $186,844 by its third weekend, and went on to gross $561,085 in the United States and Canada. In South Korea, it grossed ₩284,696,700 ($251,686) in 2015. The film grossed $763,191 in other territories, for a worldwide total of approximately $35,732,996.

=== Home media ===
In Japan, the Blu-ray release sold 15,224 units as of December 2015 and the DVD release sold 28,560 units as of July 2017, for a combined total of at least 43,784 physical home video units sold in Japan.

In the United States, the film grossed $3,478,150 from Blu-ray and DVD sales.

In the United Kingdom, it was 2016's third best-selling foreign language film on home video (behind Victor Young Perez and Ip Man 3). It was later 2017's eighth best-selling foreign language film in the UK, and the year's fourth best-selling Japanese film (behind the anime films Your Name, My Neighbor Totoro, and Yu-Gi-Oh! The Dark Side of Dimensions).

=== Book sales ===
Following the success of the film, Robinson's original novel experienced a boost in sales internationally. Her agent Caroline Sheldon sold the rights of the book to 10 countries, including Japan, Italy, Spain and China. The book was also re-released in English by HarperCollins Children's Books as part of its classics range.

=== Critical response ===
When Marnie Was There received positive reviews. On review aggregator website Rotten Tomatoes, the film holds an approval rating of 92%, based on 100 reviews, with an average rating of 7.5/10. The website's critical consensus reads, "When Marnie Was There is still blessed with enough visual and narrative beauty to recommend, even if it isn't quite as magical as Studio Ghibli's greatest works." On Metacritic, the film has a score of 72 out of 100, based on 22 critics, indicating "generally favorable reviews".

=== Accolades ===
Year	Award	Category	Recipient(s)	Results	Ref.
2015	Japan Academy Prize	Japan Academy Prize for Animation of the Year		Nominated	
2015	Chicago International Children's Film Festival	Best Animated Feature Film		Won	
2015	Asia Pacific Screen Awards	Best Animated Feature Film		Nominated	
2016	Annie Awards	Best Animated Feature – Independent		Nominated	
2016	Annie Awards	Directing in an Animated Feature Production	Hiromasa Yonebayashi	Nominated	
2016	Annie Awards	Writing in a Feature Production	Keiko Niwa, Masashi Ando and Hiromasa Yonebayashi	Nominated	
2016	Academy Awards	Best Animated Feature	Hiromasa Yonebayashi and Yoshiaki Nishimura	Nominated	
2016	Saturn Awards	Best Animated Film		Nominated	
