= Studio Ponoc =

Japanese animation studio

Studio Ponoc, Inc.
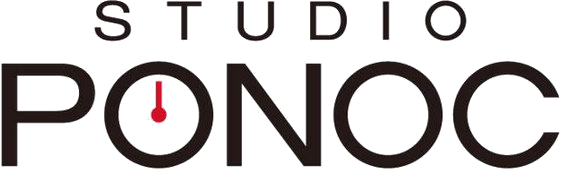
- Native name: 株式会社スタジオポノック
- Romanized name: Kabushiki-gaisha Sutajio Ponokku
- Type: KK
- Industry: Animation
- Founded: April 15, 2015; 11 years ago
- Founder: Yoshiaki Nishimura
- Headquarters: Koyonancho, Musashino, Tokyo, Japan
- Key people: Yoshiaki Nishimura (CEO)
- Website: ponoc.jp

Studio Ponoc, Inc. (Japanese: 株式会社スタジオポノック, Hepburn: Kabushiki-gaisha Sutajio Ponokku) is a Japanese independent animation studio based in Musashino, Tokyo, Japan. The company was founded in April 2015 by Yoshiaki Nishimura, former lead film producer of Studio Ghibli, with its first feature film, Mary and the Witch's Flower, being released on July 8, 2017, throughout Japan. The film's main character, Mary Smith, serves as the company's mascot in their logo, similar to Studio Ghibli's mascot, Totoro.

== History ==
Yoshiaki Nishimura founded Studio Ponoc on April 15, 2015, and gained the support of several animators previously working under Studio Ghibli, including director Hiromasa Yonebayashi. The name of the studio comes from the Serbo-Croatian word pónoć, for "midnight", meant to signify "the beginning of a new day".

The studio worked on an advertisement for JR West for its 2015 summer campaign. Mary and the Witch's Flower, the studio's first feature film, was able to reach number six of the highest-grossing films of the year in Japan. The film is based on The Little Broomstick by Mary Stewart. Several former employees of Studio Ghibli have joined the studio to work on the film. Studio Ponoc produced an animated short film titled Tomorrow's Leaves, written by Yoshiaki Nishimura and directed by Yoshiyuki Momose, in collaboration with the International Olympic Committee's Olympic Foundation for Culture and Heritage, timed to coincide with the opening of the Tokyo Olympic Games and inspired by Olympic values of "Excellence, Friendship and Respect". Production on the film started in June 2019. Its release was postponed along with the 2020 Summer Olympic Games, and the film had its world premiere at the Annecy International Animation Film Festival during its opening ceremony on June 14, 2021. The animated short film screened at the Tokyo Skytree from July 12 until September 5. The animated short film officially premiered when it was made available on YouTube by the International Olympic Committee and on Studio Ponoc's official website at ponoc.jp on July 23, the opening date of the 2020 Summer Olympic Games in Tokyo.

On January 25, 2024, Netflix announced that they had acquired worldwide streaming rights to The Imaginary, which would be added to the platform later in the year. The deal also included global streaming rights to the studio's future feature projects.

== Works ==
=== Commercials ===
- JR West "Summer Train" (2015)

=== Short works ===
- Tomorrow's Leaves (2021)

=== Films ===
English title	Release date	Directed by	Screenplay
Mary and the Witch's Flower	8 July 2017	Hiromasa Yonebayashi	Riko Sakaguchi, Hiromasa Yonebayashi
Modest Heroes	24 August 2018	Hiromasa Yonebayashi, Yoshiyuki Momose, Akihiko Yamashita	Hiromasa Yonebayashi, Yoshiyuki Momose, Akihiko Yamashita
The Imaginary	15 December 2023	Yoshiyuki Momose	Yoshiaki Nishimura
