= Hiromasa Yonebayashi =

Japanese animator and animation director (born 1973)

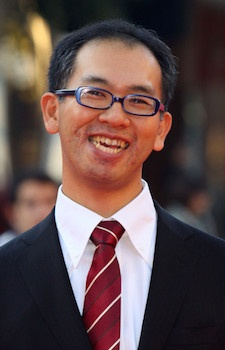
- Yonebayashi in 2016
- Born: 米林 宏昌; July 10, 1973 (age 53); Nonoichi, Ishikawa, Japan
- Occupations: Animator, animation director, director
- Years active: 1996–present
- Notable work: The Secret World of Arrietty; When Marnie Was There; Mary and the Witch's Flower

Hiromasa Yonebayashi (米林 宏昌, Yonebayashi Hiromasa; born July 10, 1973 in Nonoichi, Ishikawa, Japan), nicknamed Maro (麻呂), is a Japanese animator and director, formerly for Studio Ghibli. After his directorial debut with Studio Ghibli (The Secret World of Arrietty), he became the youngest director of a theatrical film produced by the studio. He was nominated for the Academy Award for Best Animated Feature in 2015 for his second film, When Marnie Was There.

Together with Ghibli producer Yoshiaki Nishimura, Yonebayashi left Studio Ghibli in December 2014 after 18 years, and established Studio Ponoc in June 2015. His first film as director at Studio Ponoc is Mary and the Witch's Flower.

He studied at the Kanazawa College of Art, where he majored in commercial design.

== Works ==
=== Films ===
- Princess Mononoke (1997), in between animation, clean-up animation
- Jin-Roh: The Wolf Brigade (1998), in between animation
- My Neighbors the Yamadas (1999), in between animation
- Spirited Away (2001), key animation
- Mei and the Kittenbus (2003), animation director
- Howl's Moving Castle (2004), key animation
- Tales from Earthsea (2006), assistant animation director
- Mizugumo Monmon (2006), key animation
- Ponyo (2008), key animation
- The Secret World of Arrietty (2010), director, storyboards, unit director
- From Up on Poppy Hill (2011), key animation
- The Wind Rises (2013), key animation
- When Marnie Was There (2014), director, screenplay
- Mary and the Witch's Flower (2017), director, screenplay
- Modest Heroes (2018), director, screenplay
- The Boy and the Heron (2023), key animation

=== Television ===
- Serial Experiments Lain (1998), key animation
- Ghiblies (2000 special), key animation
- Monster (2004), key animation
- Welcome to the Ballroom (2017), key animation

=== Original video animations ===
- Nasu: A Migratory Bird with Suitcase (2007), key animation
