= Shinosuke Tatekawa =

- 立川 志の輔
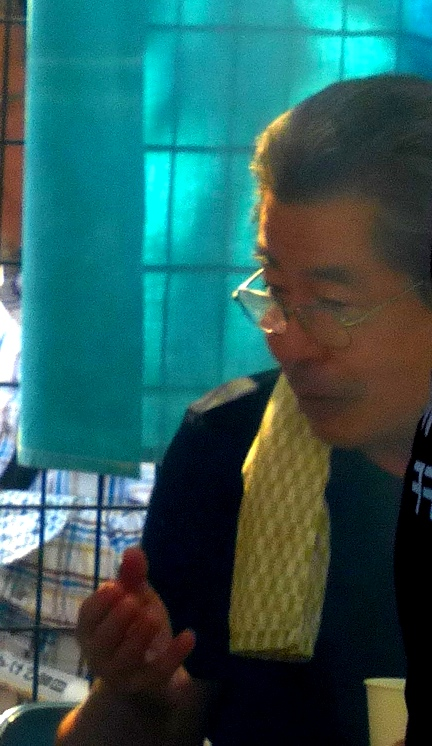
- Tatekawa Shinosuke, 2015
- Born: Teruo Takeuchi; February 15, 1954 (age 72)
- Notable work: Tameshite Gatten

Comedy career
- Genre: Rakugo
- Website: Official website (in Japanese)

Shinosuke Tatekawa (立川 志の輔, Tatekawa Shinosuke; born 15 February 1954, from Shinminato, Toyama (now part of Imizu)) is a rakugo performer. His real name is Teruo Takeuchi (竹内 照雄, Takeuchi Teruo). With his comic group, Rokunin-no-Kai (Group of Six), formed in 2003, he has helped to popularise rakugo among young Japanese people. He is also well known as a TV presenter, and has presented the primetime NHK General show Tameshite Gatten (ためしてガッテン) since it started in 1995.

Tatekawa received the grand prize Sponichi Art & Culture Award in 2008 for "Shinosuke Rakugo in Parco".

== Filmography ==
=== Television ===
- Taiyō ni Hoero! (1976), mechanic (episode 196)
- Tameshite Gatten (1995–2022), host

=== Film ===
- GeGeGe no Kitarō (2007), Bakezōri (voice)
- The Tale of the Princess Kaguya (2013), Inbe no Akita (voice)
- A Living Promise (2016), Yōsuke Kondō
- The Island of Cats (2019), Daikichi
- Poupelle of Chimney Town (2020) (voice)
- Angry Rice Wives (2021)
- Dreaming of the Meridian Arc (2022)

== Honours ==
- Medal with Purple Ribbon (2015)
