= List of Studio Ghibli works =

This is a list of works (films, television, shorts etc.) by the Japanese animation studio Studio Ghibli. Studio Ghibli has produced 22 feature films, with its first being Castle in the Sky on August 2, 1986, and its latest being The Boy and the Heron on July 14, 2023.

== Works ==
=== Feature films ===
Year	English Title	Japanese Title	Director	Screenwriter(s)	Producer(s)	Music	Commercial premiere	Running time
1986	Castle in the Sky	天空の城ラピュタ	Hayao Miyazaki		Isao Takahata	Joe Hisaishi	Japan: August 2, 1986	125 minutes
1988	My Neighbor Totoro	となりのトトロ	Hayao Miyazaki		Toru Hara	Joe Hisaishi	Japan: April 16, 1988	86 minutes
1988	Grave of the Fireflies	火垂るの墓	Isao Takahata		Toru Hara	Michio Mamiya	Japan: April 16, 1988	88 minutes
1989	Kiki's Delivery Service	魔女の宅急便	Hayao Miyazaki			Joe Hisaishi	Japan: July 29, 1989	103 minutes
1991	Only Yesterday	おもひでぽろぽろ	Isao Takahata		Toshio Suzuki	Masaru Hoshi	Japan: July 20, 1991; English dub premiere: January 1, 2016	119 minutes
1992	Porco Rosso	紅の豚	Hayao Miyazaki		Toshio Suzuki	Joe Hisaishi	Japan: July 18, 1992	93 minutes
1994	Pom Poko	平成狸合戦ぽんぽこ	Isao Takahata		Toshio Suzuki	Shang Shang Typhoon	Japan: July 16, 1994	119 minutes
1995	Whisper of the Heart	耳をすませば	Yoshifumi Kondō	Hayao Miyazaki	Toshio Suzuki	Yuji Nomi	Japan: July 15, 1995	111 minutes
1997	Princess Mononoke	もののけ姫	Hayao Miyazaki		Toshio Suzuki	Joe Hisaishi	Japan: July 12, 1997; United States: October 29, 1999	133 minutes
1999	My Neighbors the Yamadas	ホーホケキョ となりの山田くん	Isao Takahata		Toshio Suzuki	Akiko Yano	Japan: July 17, 1999	103 minutes
2001	Spirited Away	千と千尋の神隠し	Hayao Miyazaki		Toshio Suzuki	Joe Hisaishi	Japan: July 20, 2001; United States: September 20, 2002	125 minutes
2002	The Cat Returns	猫の恩返し	Hiroyuki Morita	Reiko Yoshida	Nozomu Takahashi and Toshio Suzuki	Yuji Nomi	Japan: July 19, 2002	75 minutes
2004	Howl's Moving Castle	ハウルの動く城	Hayao Miyazaki		Toshio Suzuki	Joe Hisaishi	Japan: November 20, 2004; United States: June 10, 2005	119 minutes
2006	Tales from Earthsea	ゲド戦記	Gorō Miyazaki	Gorō Miyazaki and Keiko Niwa	Toshio Suzuki	Tamiya Terashima	Japan: July 29, 2006; United States: August 13, 2010	115 minutes
2008	Ponyo	崖の上のポニョ	Hayao Miyazaki		Toshio Suzuki	Joe Hisaishi	Japan: July 19, 2008; United States: August 14, 2009	101 minutes
2010	Arrietty	借りぐらしのアリエッティ	Hiromasa Yonebayashi	Hayao Miyazaki and Keiko Niwa	Toshio Suzuki	Cécile Corbel	Japan: July 17, 2010; United States: February 17, 2012	94 minutes
2011	From Up on Poppy Hill	コクリコ坂から	Gorō Miyazaki	Hayao Miyazaki and Keiko Niwa	Toshio Suzuki	Satoshi Takebe	Japan: July 16, 2011; United States: March 15, 2013	91 minutes
2013	The Wind Rises	風立ちぬ	Hayao Miyazaki		Toshio Suzuki	Joe Hisaishi	Japan: July 20, 2013; United States: February 21, 2014	126 minutes
2013	The Tale of the Princess Kaguya	かぐや姫の物語	Isao Takahata	Isao Takahata and Riko Sakaguchi	Yoshiaki Nishimura	Joe Hisaishi	Japan: November 23, 2013; United States: October 17, 2014	137 minutes
2014	When Marnie Was There	思い出のマーニー	Hiromasa Yonebayashi	Keiko Niwa, Masashi Ando and Hiromasa Yonebayashi	Yoshiaki Nishimura	Takatsugu Muramatsu	Japan: July 19, 2014; United States: May 22, 2015	103 minutes
2016	The Red Turtle (Note: Co-production with Wild Bunch)	レッドタートル ある島の物語	Michaël Dudok de Wit	Michaël Dudok de Wit and Pascale Ferran	Toshio Suzuki, Isao Takahata, Vincent Maraval, Pascal Caucheteux and Grégoire Sorlat	Laurent Perez del Mar	May 18, 2016	80 minutes
2023	The Boy and the Heron	君たちはどう生きるか	Hayao Miyazaki		Toshio Suzuki	Joe Hisaishi	Japan: July 14, 2023; United States: December 8, 2023	124 minutes

=== Television films ===
Year	English title	Japanese title	Director	Screenwriter(s)	Producer(s)	Music	Broadcast	Running time	Notes
1993	Ocean Waves	海がきこえる	Tomomi Mochizuki	Keiko Niwa (Note: Credited as Kaori Nakamura.)	Nozomu Takahashi, Seiji Okuda and Toshio Suzuki	Shigeru Nagata	May 5, 1993 (Nippon TV)	72 minutes	TV movie that was released direct-to-DVD internationally and received a limited theatrical release in the UK and the US.
2020	Earwig and the Witch	アーヤと魔女	Goro Miyazaki	Keiko Niwa and Emi Gunji	Toshio Suzuki	Satoshi Takebe	December 30, 2020 (NHK General TV)	82 minutes	CGI TV special that received an international limited theatrical release and a limited theatrical re-release in Japan both in 2021.

=== Television series ===
Year	English title	Japanese title	Series director	Head writer	Producer	Music	Original run	No. of episodes	Notes
2014	Ronja, the Robber's Daughter	山賊の娘ローニャ	Goro Miyazaki	Hiroyuki Kawasaki	Nobuo Kawakami	Satoshi Takebe	October 11, 2014 — March 28, 2015 (NHK)	26	Based on Ronia, the Robber's Daughter by Astrid Lindgren. Co-produced with Polygon Pictures.

=== Short films ===
These are short films, including those created for television, theatrical release, and the Ghibli Museum. Original video animation releases and music videos (theatrical and television) are also listed in this section.

Year	Title	Director	Producer	Notes
1995	Ghibli Experimental Theater On Your Mark	Hayao Miyazaki	Toshio Suzuki	A promotional music video for Chage & Aska
2000	Ghiblies	Yoshiyuki Momose	Hiroyuki Watanabe	TV short film
2001	Kujiratori (The Whale Hunt)	Hayao Miyazaki		Ghibli Museum
2001–2009	Film Guru Guru – Kūsō no Kikaitachi no Naka no Hakai no Hatsumei (2002) – The Theory of Evolution (2009)	Hayao Miyazaki	Hiromasa Yonebayashi	Ghibli Museum
2002	Ghiblies Episode 2	Yoshiyuki Momose		Shown theatrically before The Cat Returns
2002	Koro's Big Day Out	Hayao Miyazaki		Ghibli Museum
2002	Imaginary Flying Machines	Hayao Miyazaki	Toshio Suzuki	Ghibli Museum
2002	Mei And The Kittenbus	Hayao Miyazaki		Ghibli Museum
2004	Portable Airport	Yoshiyuki Momose		A music video created by Studio Kajino for Capsule
2004	Space Station No. 9	Yoshiyuki Momose		A music video created by Studio Kajino for Capsule
2005	Doredore no Uta	Osamu Tanabe		A promotional music video for Meiko Haigou
2005	Soratobu Toshikeikaku (A Flying City Plan)	Yoshiyuki Momose		A music video created by Studio Kajino for Capsule
2005	Looking For A Home	Hayao Miyazaki		Ghibli Museum
2006	Hoshi o Katta Hi (The Day I Raised a Planet/The Day I Harvested a Planet)	Hayao Miyazaki		Ghibli Museum
2006	Water Spider Monmon	Hayao Miyazaki		Ghibli Museum
2006	The Night of Taneyamagahara	Kazuo Oga		A DVD version was released for Japan on July 7, 2006
2007	Iblard Jikan	Naohisa Inoue		Released in Japan on DVD and Blu-ray disc on July 4, 2007, as part of the Ghibli ga Ippai Collection
2009	"Piece"	Yoshiyuki Momose		A promotional music video for Yui Aragaki
2010	A Sumo Wrestler's Tail	Akihiko Yamashita		Ghibli Museum
2010	Mr. Dough and the Egg Princess	Hayao Miyazaki		Ghibli Museum
2011	Treasure Hunting	Rieko Nakagawa		Ghibli Museum
2012	Giant God Warrior Appears in Tokyo	Shinji Higuchi		Shown at Museum of Contemporary Art Tokyo
2018	Boro the Caterpillar	Hayao Miyazaki		Premiered March 21, 2018 at the Ghibli Museum. The production of this short, which began secretly in 2016, was covered in the NHK documentary Never-Ending Man: Hayao Miyazaki (2017)
2022	Zen – Grogu and Dust Bunnies	Katsuya Kondō		A Ghibli and Lucasfilm collaborative Star Wars short film for Disney+ on November 12, 2022.
2026	A Night in the Valley of Witches	Goro Miyazaki Akihiko Yamashita		Premiered July 8th, 2026, at Cinema Orion, Ghibli Park.

=== Commercials ===
Title	Publisher	Director	Notes
Nandarō (What's That?)	Nippon TV	Hayao Miyazaki	Produced for the NTV 40th anniversary
Sora Iro no Tane (The Sky-Colored Seed)	Nippon TV	Hayao Miyazaki	Based on the book by Rieko Nakagawa with illustrations by Yuriko Ōmura
Hotaru no Haka	Kinyō Roadshow	Yoshifumi Kondō	Based on the film Grave of the Fireflies
Kinyō Roadshow Opening	Kinyō Roadshow	Yoshifumi Kondō	
www.TVshop1.com	TVshop1.com	Yoshiyuki Momose	
LAWSON Sen to Chihiro no Kamikakushii	Lawson		Lawson convenience store tie in with Spirited Away DVD
Umacha (Tasty Tea)	Asahi Soft Drinks	Yoshiyuki Momose	Several commercials featuring voices by Rina Uchiyama and Takashi Naitō
Ghibli Museum Tickets	Ghibli Museum	Hayao Miyazaki	Announcement for the opening of the Studio Ghibli Museum in Mitaka, Tokyo
House Foods – The Cat Returns	House Foods		House Foods products tie-in campaign for The Cat Returns
Resona Bank	Resona Holdings		For the bank owned by Resona
O-uchi de Tabeyou	House Foods	Hayao Miyazaki; Yoshiyuki Momose	House Foods commercial, summer version
O-uchi de Tabeyou	House Foods	Yoshiyuki Momose	House Foods commercial, winter version
KNB Yumedegi	Kitanihon Broadcasting	Shinji Hashimoto	
Yomiuri Shimbun – Kawaraban	Yomiuri Shimbun		
Yomiuri Shimbun – Dore Dore Hikkōshi	Yomiuri Shimbun		
Nisshin Seifun	Yomiuri Shimbun	Katsuya Kondō	TV spot designed by Toshio Suzuki and Gorō Miyazaki
Yomiuri Shimbun	Yomiuri Shimbun	Gorō Miyazaki	TV spot for the newspaper, animated in the style of Shigeru Sugiura

=== Video games ===
Year	Title	Developer	Platform
2010	Ni no Kuni: Dominion of the Dark Djinn	Level-5	Nintendo DS
2011	Ni no Kuni: Wrath of the White Witch	Level-5	PlayStation 3, PlayStation 4, Nintendo Switch, PC

=== Stage productions ===
- Princess Mononoke (2013)
- Nausicaä of the Valley of the Wind (2019)
- Spirited Away (2022)
- My Neighbour Totoro (2022)

=== Other works ===
The works listed here consist of works that do not fall into the above categories. All of these films have been released on DVD or Blu-ray in Japan as part of the Ghibli Gakujutsu Library.

Year	Title	English title	Notes
1987	The Story of Yanagawa's Canals (Note: This film was actually funded and produced by Ghibli in their only independent and (almost entirely) live-action production, nevertheless it is still included on the "Ghibli Gakujutsu Library" probably because of its documentary format.)		Documentary by Isao Takahata originally broadcast on NHK.
1998	Sekai Waga Kokoro no Tabi		Documentary following Isao Takahata to Canada to meet Frédéric Back.
1999	Sekai Waga Kokoro no Tabi		Documentary travelling with Hayao Miyazaki as he follows the footsteps of Antoine de Saint-Exupéry.
2001	Mononoke Hime wa Koushite Umareta.	How Princess Mononoke Was Born	A behind the scenes film directed by Toshio Uratani, documenting the production of Princess Mononoke. Shot over a 2-year period, split into 3 chapters with a total running time of 400 minutes.
2003	Lasseter-san, Arigatou	Thank You, Mr. Lasseter	A thank you video created for John Lasseter, following Hayao Miyazaki and other Studio Ghibli staff to Pixar Animation Studios in Emeryville, California in 2002, in preparation for the English language release of Spirited Away.
2004	Miyazaki Hayao Produce no Ichimai no CD ha Kōshite Umareta	Hayao Miyazaki Produces a CD	A film about Miyazaki's involvement in Tsunehiko Kamijo's Okaasa no Shashin CD. The second part features a recording of Kamijo's live performance at the Ghibli Museum in 2003.
2004	Otsuka Yasuo no Ugokasu Yorokobi	Yasuo Otsuka's Joy of Motion	A documentary about animator Yasuo Otsuka, mentor to Hayao Miyazaki and Isao Takahata.
2005	Miyazaki Hayao to Ghibli Bijutsukan		A film featuring Gorō Miyazaki and Isao Takahata touring the Ghibli Museum.
2007	Jiburi no Eshokunin – Oga Kazuo Ten – Totoro no Mori o Kaita Hito	A Ghibli Artisan – Kazuo Oga Exhibition – The Man Who Painted Totoro's Forest	A documentary to commemorate an exhibition at the Museum of Contemporary Art, Tokyo, featuring the work of Studio Ghibli background artist Kazuo Oga.
2009	Ghibli no Fūkei	Scenery of Ghibli	DVD release of two specials, originally broadcast on BS Nippon TV. The first from 2006 with a running time of 85 minutes, follows Japanese actors Mayu Tsuruta, Yui Natsukawa and Tetta Sugimoto to Europe, matching Miyazaki's storyboards to the real world scenery and attractions that served as inspiration to the settings of his animated films. The second from 2008, with a running time of 95 minutes, travels with Mayu Tsuruta around 'traditional' and 'nostalgic' Japan, to find the domestic inspirations of Miyazaki's work.
2009	Suzuki Toshio no Ghibli Asemamire, 99 no Kotoba	Toshio Suzuki's Ghibli Asemamire, 99 Words	A compilation of 49 interviews conducted by Toshio Suzuki on his weekly radio program Ghibli Asemamire, broadcasting on Tokyo FM.
2009	Joe Hisaishi in Budokan – 25 years with the Animations of Hayao Miyazaki		Concert footage of Joe Hisaishi's 3 nights at the Nippon Budokan venue in August 2008, where he played various pieces from throughout his 25-year collaboration with Studio Ghibli. Originally broadcast on NHK.
2011	Ghibli no Hondana	Ghibli's Bookshelf	Accompanying the release of Arrietty, this documentary, originally broadcast on BS Nippon Television, explores the influence of children's literature on Miyazaki and Takahata's body of work and Studio Ghibli as a whole.
2013	Ghibli no Fūkei	Scenery of Ghibli	A third special broadcast on BS Nippon TV, hosted by Kurara Chibana. This film journeys to the Swiss Alps, returning to the locations scouted by Isao Takahata and Hayao Miyazaki in the 1970s during the production of Heidi, Girl of the Alps and Anne of Green Gables. This edition also interviews Gorō Miyazaki about the real life locations and settings that inspired From Up on Poppy Hill.
2013	Yume to Kyōki no ōkoku	The Kingdom of Dreams and Madness	Director Mami Sunada follows Hayao Miyazaki, Toshio Suzuki and Isao Takahata over the course of a year as Studio Ghibli prepares to release two films. Released theatrically in Japan in 2013 and in the United States in 2014.
2014	Isao Takahata – The Making of The Tale of Princess Kaguya ~ Ghibli Seventh Studio ~ the Legend of 933 Days		Originally broadcast as two 43 minute episodes on WOWOW in December 2013. The DVD and Blu-ray version, released in Japan in December 2014, expands the behind-the-scenes film, documenting the production of The Tale of the Princess Kaguya, to 201 minutes. An 86-minute version of the film was released in the UK on DVD and digital formats as Isao Takahata And His Tale Of The Princess Kaguya in March 2015.

=== Exhibitions ===
A selection of layout designs for animated productions was exhibited in the Studio Ghibli Layout Designs: Understanding the Secrets of Takahata and Miyazaki Animation exhibition tour, which started in the Museum of Contemporary Art Tokyo (July 28, 2008, to September 28, 2008) and subsequently travelled to different museums throughout Japan and Asia, concluding its tour of Japan in the Fukuoka Asian Art Museum (October 12, 2013, to January 26, 2014) and its tour of Asia in the Hong Kong Heritage Museum (May 14, 2014, to August 31, 2014). Between October 4, 2014, and March 1, 2015, the layout designs were exhibited at Art Ludique in Paris. The exhibition catalogues contain annotated reproductions of the displayed artwork.

== Related works ==
These works were not created by Studio Ghibli, but were produced by a variety of studios and people who went on to form or join Studio Ghibli. This includes members of Topcraft that went on to create Studio Ghibli in 1985; works produced by Toei Animation, TMS Entertainment, Nippon Animation, or other studios and featuring involvement by Hayao Miyazaki, Isao Takahata, or other Ghibli staffers. The list also includes works created in cooperation with Studio Ghibli.

=== Pre-Ghibli ===
Year	Title	Studio(s)	Notes
1963	Wanpaku Ōji no Orochi Taiji	Toei Animation	Isao Takahata was the assistant director.
1963	Wolf Boy Ken	Toei Animation	Isao Takahata was director, and Hayao Miyazaki was one of the in-between animators.
1963	Doggie March	Toei Animation	Hayao Miyazaki was one of the in-between animators.
1964	Shōnen Ninja Kaze no Fujimaru	Toei Animation	Hayao Miyazaki was one of the in-between and key animators.
1965	Gulliver's Travels Beyond the Moon	Toei Animation	Hayao Miyazaki was one of the in-between animators.
1966	Sally the Witch	Toei Animation	Hayao Miyazaki was a key animator on this series, based on a manga by Mitsuteru Yokoyama.
1968–1972	GeGeGe no Kitaro	Toei Animation	First and second TV series directed by Isao Takahata, based on the manga series by Shigeru Mizuki.
1968	The Great Adventure of Horus, Prince of the Sun	Toei Animation	Takahata's directorial debut; Hayao Miyazaki was chief animator, concept artist, and scene designer.
1969	Himitsu no Akko-chan	Toei Animation	Directed by Hiroshi Ikeda; Miyazaki was a key animator.
1969	The Wonderful World of Puss 'n Boots	Toei Animation	Directed by Kimio Yabuki, written by Hisashi Inoue with gag supervision by Nakahara Yumihiko, key animators include Yasuo Otsuka, Yoichi Kotabe, Reiko Okuyama, Takuo Kikuchi, Akemi Ota, Hayao Miyazaki, and Akira Daikubara. The main character of the film; Pero would become the mascot for Toei Animation.
1969	Moomin	Tokyo Movie Shinsha and Mushi Production	Key animation by Hayao Miyazaki.
1969	Flying Phantom Ship	Toei Animation	Directed by Hiroshi Ikeda with key animation by Hayao Miyazaki.
1971	Animal Treasure Island	Toei Animation	Directed by Hiroshi Ikeda with key animation by Hayao Miyazaki; Hayao Miyazaki was also scene designer and chief animator.
1971	Ali Baba and the Forty Thieves	Toei Animation	Directed by Hiroshi Shidara with key animation by Hayao Miyazaki.
1971	Lupin III Part I	Tokyo Movie Shinsha	The majority of the episodes were directed by Hayao Miyazaki and Isao Takahata, based on the manga series by Monkey Punch.
1972	Panda! Go, Panda!	Tokyo Movie Shinsha	Directed by Isao Takahata and written by Hayao Miyazaki.
1973	Panda! Go, Panda!: The Rainy-Day Circus	Tokyo Movie Shinsha	Directed by Isao Takahata and written by Hayao Miyazaki.
1973	Jungle Kurobe	Tokyo Movie Shinsha	Created by Fujiko F. Fujio, Directed by Osamu Dezaki and character designs by Hayao Miyazaki.
1974	Heidi, Girl of the Alps	Nippon Animation	Directed by Isao Takahata, scene setting and layout by Hayao Miyazaki.
1975	Dog of Flanders	Nippon Animation	Animation by Hayao Miyazaki, storyboards of episode 15 by Isao Takahata.
1976	3000 Leagues in Search of Mother	Nippon Animation	Directed by Isao Takahata; scene setting and layout by Hayao Miyazaki.
1977	Lupin III Part II	Tokyo Movie Shinsha	Two episodes directed by Hayao Miyazaki in 1980.
1977	Rascal the Raccoon	Nippon Animation	Key animation by Hayao Miyazaki.
1978	Future Boy Conan	Nippon Animation	Directed by Hayao Miyazaki, with two episodes directed by Isao Takahata, and featured animation work by many future Ghibli staffers.
1979	Anne of Green Gables	Nippon Animation	Directed by Isao Takahata; scene setting and layout by Hayao Miyazaki for the first 15 episodes.
1979	Lupin III: The Castle of Cagliostro	TMS Entertainment	Miyazaki's directorial feature debut.
1979	Taro the Dragon Boy	Toei Animation	Original concept by Isao Takahata.
1981	Jarinko Chie	Tokyo Movie Shinsha and Toho	Directed by Isao Takahata.
1982	Space Adventure Cobra: The Movie	Tokyo Movie Shinsha	Key animation by Hayao Miyazaki.
1982	Gauche the Cellist	OH Production	Directed by Isao Takahata.
1982	The Wizard of Oz	Topcraft	Music composed by Joe Hisaishi.
1984	Sherlock Hound	Tokyo Movie Shinsha	Six Episodes directed by Hayao Miyazaki.
1984	Nausicaä of the Valley of the Wind (Note: Not produced but re-released under the Studio Ghibli brand)	Topcraft	Directed by Hayao Miyazaki based on his own manga; Produced by Isao Takahata; Featuring several of the animators and future collaborators of the Studio. While not a Ghibli production it is generally considered the team's first production.

=== Cooperative works ===
Year	Title	Company	Creator	Director	Studio Ghibli Role	Notes
1991	Ozanari Dungeon	Tokyo Movie Shinsha	Motoo Koyama	Hiroshi Aoyama	Animation Corporation	OVA series
1993	Armored Dragon Legend Villgust	Animate Film and Studio Fantasia		Katsuhiko Nishijima	Animation Assistance Studio	Studio Ghibli was one of the Animation Assistance Studios for Episode 2: "The Revived Land"
1995	Sailor Moon SuperS: The Movie	Toei Animation	Naoko Takeuchi	Hiroki Shibata	Production Association Studio	Studio Ghibli was one of the production association studios
1995–1996	Neon Genesis Evangelion	Gainax and Tatsunoko Production	Hideaki Anno	Hideaki Anno	Co-Producer & Animation Studio	Animation and co-produced by Studio Ghibli on Episode 11: "The Day Tokyo-3 Stood Still"
1995	Lupin III: Farewell to Nostradamus	Tokyo Movie Shinsha	Monkey Punch	Shunya Itō; Takeshi Shirato	Animation Cooperation	
1996	Dragon Ball Movie 4: The Path to Power	Toei Animation	Akira Toriyama	Shigeyasu Yamauchi	Production Cooperation Studio	Studio Ghibli was one of the production cooperation studios
1996–1997	Kaiketsu Zorro	Ashi Productions	Johnston McCulley	Katsumi Minoguchi	Production Cooperation Studio	Production cooperation by Studio Ghibli on episodes 26, 31 and 51
2000	Shiki-Jitsu	Studio Kajino		Hideaki Anno		
2001	Satorare (Transparent: Tribute to a Sad Genius)			Katsuyuki Motohiro	Co-Production by Studio Ghibli	live-action film
2004	Ghost in the Shell 2: Innocence	Production I.G	Masamune Shirow	Mamoru Oshii	Production Cooperation Studio	
2010–2014	Mobile Suit Gundam Unicorn	Sunrise	Hajime Yatate; Yoshiyuki Tomino	Kazuhiro Furuhashi	Co-Production	OVA series; co-produced by Studio Ghibli on Episode 3: "The Ghost of Laplace"
2016	The Red Turtle	Wild Bunch	Michaël Dudok de Wit	Michael Dudok De Wit	Co-production	Animation production by Prima Linea Productions
2022	Zen – Grogu and Dust Bunnies	Lucasfilm				

=== Distributive works ===
These Western animated films (plus one Japanese film) have been distributed by Studio Ghibli, and now through their label, Ghibli Museum Library.

Title	Release Date	Country of Origin	Film Made By	Notes
Mr. Bug Goes to Town	1941	United States	Fleischer Studios	
The Humpbacked Horse (Russian: Konyok Gorbunok)	1947	Russia	Ivan Ivanov-Vano	
Animal Farm	1954	United Kingdom	Halas and Batchelor	
The Snow Queen (Russian: Snezhnaya koroleva)	1957	Russian	Lev Atamanov	
Margo the Mouse (Polish: Przygody Myszki)	1976	Poland	Eugeniusz Kotowski	animation series
The King and the Mockingbird (French: Le Roi et l'oiseau)	1980	France	Paul Grimault	
Kirikou and the Sorceress (French: Kirikou et la Sorcière)	1998	France / Belgium	Michel Ocelot	
Prince and Princess (French: Prince et princesse)	1999	France	Michel Ocelot	
The Triplets of Belleville (French: Les Triplettes de Belleville)	2002	France	Sylvain Chomet	
Winter Days (Japanese: 冬の日 (Fuyu no Hi))	2004	Japan	Kihachirō Kawamoto	experimental animation anthology
Azur & Asmar: The Princes' Quest	2006	France	Michel Ocelot	
My Love (Russian: Moya Iyubov)	2006	Russian	Aleksandr Petrov	
Kirikou and the Wild Beasts (French: Kirikou et les bêtes sauvages)	2007	France	Michel Ocelot	
The Illusionist (French: L'Illusionniste)	2010	Britain / France	Sylvain Chomet	
Tales of the Night (French: Les Contes de la nuit)	2011	France	Michel Ocelot	
Wrinkles (Spanish: Arrugas)	2012	Spain	Ignacio Ferreras	

=== Contributive works ===
Studio Ghibli has made contributions to the following anime series and movies:

Year	Title	Company	Studio Ghibli Contribution
1991	Otaku no Video	Gainax	series in-between animation
1992–present	Crayon Shin-chan	Shin-Ei Animation	series in-between animation
1992	Giant Robo	Mu Animation Studio	key animation assistance on episode 2 only
1994	Street Fighter II: The Animated Movie	Group TAC	cooperation in photography
1995	Memories	Studio 4°C	cooperation in photography on Cannon Fodder sequence
1995	Legend of Crystania – The Motion Picture	Triangle Staff	backgrounds
1995–1996	Gunsmith Cats	Oriental Light and Magic	in-betweeners and photography on episodes 1 and 2 only
1995–1996	Fushigi Yûgi	Pierrot	in-between animation on episodes 5, 6, 9–12, and 14
1996	Fire Emblem	Studio Fantasia and KSS	in-between animation on episode 1 only
1996–2004	Kochira Katsushika-ku Kamearikouen-mae Hashutsujo	Studio Gallop	series in-between animation
1997–1998	Flame of Recca	Pierrot	series backgrounds
1998	Trigun	Madhouse Studios	series in-between animation and key animation on episode 3 only
1998	Spriggan	Studio 4°C	in-between animation
1998	Detective Conan: The Fourteenth Target	TMS Entertainment	in-between animation
1998–1999	Popolocrois Monogatari	Bee Train and Production I.G	series in-between animation
1999	Kochira Katsushika-ku Kamearikouen-mae Hashutsujo: The Movie	Studio Gallop	in-between animation
1999	Cardcaptor Sakura: The Movie	Madhouse Studios	special effects
2000	Cardcaptor Sakura Movie 2: The Sealed Card	Madhouse Studios	special effects
2000–2003	The King of Braves GaoGaiGar Final	Sunrise	series in-between animation
2001	s-CRY-ed	Sunrise	series in-between animation
2001–2002	Captain Kuppa	Bee Train	series in-between animation
2001	You're Under Arrest	Studio Deen	in-between animation on episode 26 only
2002	Azumanga Daioh	J.C.Staff	backgrounds on episode 11 only
2002	A Tree of Palme	Palm Studio	in-between cooperation
2002–2003	Overman King Gainer	Sunrise	in-between animation on episode 26 only
2003	.hack//Liminality vol. 1: In the Case of Mai Minase	Bee Train	in-between animation
2003–2004	Fullmetal Alchemist	Bones	series in-between animation
2004	Samurai 7	Gonzo	background art on episodes 6–9, 11, 12, 15, 16 and 18–23
2004–2005	Gankutsuou: The Count of Monte Cristo	Gonzo	in-between animation and digital coloring on episodes 20, 23 and 24
2004	InuYasha the Movie: Fire on the Mystic Island	Sunrise	backgrounds
2005	The Prince of Tennis: The Two Samurai, The First Game	Production I.G and NAS	in-between animation
2005–2006	Immortal Grand Prix	Production I.G	in-between animation on episodes 1 and 2 only
2005	Elemental Gelade	Xebec	background art on episodes 2–6 and 9
2006	Black Lagoon: The Second Barrage	Madhouse Studios	background art on episode 24 only
2006	Tekkonkinkreet	Studio 4°C	background art
2006	The Girl Who Leapt Through Time (2006 film)	Madhouse Studios	character and background art
2006–2007	Le Chevalier D'Eon	Production I.G	digital paint and in between animation on episodes 1–3 and 6
2006	xxxHOLiC	Production I.G	in-between animation on episodes 18, 20 and 23
2007	Reideen	Production I.G and Tohokushinsha Film	digital paint and in-between animation on episodes 1–3
2007	Gurren Lagann	Gainax	series finish animation and in-between animation
2008	Tetsuwan Birdy: Decode	A-1 Pictures	in-between animation on episode 5 only
2008–2009	Xam'd: Lost Memories	Bones	series in-between animation
2008–2009	Mobile Suit Gundam 00 Second Season	Sunrise	in-between animation on episodes 4 and 9 only
2008	Shikabane Hime: Aka	Gainax and Feel	in-between assistance on episodes 2, 5, 8 and 10
2008	One Outs	Madhouse Studios	series backgrounds
2009	King of Thorn	Sunrise	background art
2009	Tsubasa Chronicle: Spring Thunder	Production I.G	series in-between animation
2009–2010	Fullmetal Alchemist: Brotherhood	Bones	series in-between animation
2010	Bleach: Hell Verse	Pierrot	backgrounds
2011	Usagi Drop	Production I.G	in-between animation on episodes 7, 8, 10 and 11
2011	The Legend of Heroes: Trails in the Sky	Kinema Citrus	in-between animation
2011	Scryed Alteration I Tao	Sunrise	in-between animation
2012	Evangelion: 3.0 You Can (Not) Redo	Studio Khara	in-between animation
2013	Berserk: The Golden Age Arc III – The Advent	Studio 4°C	background art
2021	Evangelion: 3.0+1.0 Thrice Upon a Time	Studio Khara	background art

== Significant achievements ==
- The highest-grossing film of the year in Japan
  - 1989: Kiki's Delivery Service
  - 1991: Only Yesterday
  - 1992: Porco Rosso
  - 1994: Pom Poko
  - 1995: Whisper of the Heart (also the first Japanese film in Dolby Digital)
  - 2001: Spirited Away
  - 2008: Ponyo
  - 2010: The Secret World of Arrietty
  - 2013: The Wind Rises
- The first Studio Ghibli film to use computer graphics: Pom Poko
- The first Miyazaki feature to use computer graphics, and the first Studio Ghibli film to use digital coloring; the first animated feature in Japan's history to gross more than 10 billion yen at the box office and the first animated film ever to win a National Academy Award for Best Picture of the Year: Princess Mononoke
- The first Studio Ghibli film to be shot using a 100% digital process: My Neighbors the Yamadas
- The first Miyazaki feature to be shot using a 100% digital process; the first film to gross $200 million worldwide before opening in North America; the film to finally overtake Titanic at the Japanese box office, becoming the top-grossing film in the history of Japanese cinema: Spirited Away
- The first anime and traditionally animated winner of the Academy Award for Best Animated Feature: Spirited Away at the 75th Academy Awards. They would later win this award for a second time with The Boy and the Heron at the 96th Academy Awards, marking the second time a traditionally animated film won the award.
