= List of animated short films of the 2000s =

Films are sorted by year and then alphabetically. They include theatrical, television, and direct-to-video films with less than 40 minutes runtime. For a list of films with over 40 minutes of runtime, see List of animated feature films of the 2000s.

== 2000 ==
Name	Country	Technique
Adagio	Russia	Stop-motion Animation
Black Jack: The Boy Who Came from the Sky	Japan	Anime
Bobby the Lizard Boy	United States	Traditional Animation
The Boy Who Saw the Iceberg	Canada	Traditional Animation
Bully Dance	Canada	Traditional Animation
Captain Scarlet and the Return of the Mysterons	United Kingdom	Computer Animation
Catch of the Day	United States	Traditional Animation
Cloud Cover	United Kingdom	Traditional Animation
Digimon Adventure: Our War Game!	Japan	Anime
Digimon Adventure 3D: Digimon Grand Prix!	Japan	Computer Animation
Echigo no Mukashibanashi: Attaten Ganoo	Japan	Traditional Animation
Edwurd Fudwupper Fibbed Big	United States	Computer Animation
Father and Daughter	Belgium, Netherlands, United Kingdom	Traditional Animation
For the Birds	United States	Computer Animation
From the Big Bang to Tuesday Morning	Canada	Traditional Animation
Geraldine	France	Flash Animation
Hairballs	United States	Traditional Animation
Intolerance	United Kingdom	Cutout Animation
John Henry	United States	Traditional Animation
Killer Bean 2: The Party	United States	Computer Animation
Little Go Beep	United States	Traditional Animation
Longhair and Doubledome: Good Wheel Hunting	United States	Traditional Animation
Lost Cat	United States	Traditional Animation
Lucky Lydia	United States	Traditional Animation
Lounge Act	United Kingdom	Stop-motion Animation
Metropopular	United States	Computer Animation
Ojamajo Doremi #: The Movie	Japan	Anime
Prickles the Cactus	United States	Traditional Animation
Rejected	United States	Traditional Animation
Santa Mouse and the Ratdeer	United States	Traditional Animation
Shangoul and Mangoul	Iran	Stop-motion Animation
Six of One	United Kingdom	Traditional Animation
Stubble Trouble	United States	Traditional Animation
Trevor!	United States	Traditional Animation
An Uncle Gus Cartoon: For the Love of Monkeys	United States	Traditional Animation
Whatever Happened to... Robot Jones?	United States	Traditional Animation
When the Day Breaks	Canada	Traditional Animation

== 2001 ==
Name	Country	Technique
12 Tiny Christmas Tales	United States	Traditional Animation
Camouflage	United Kingdom	Traditional Animation
Captain Sturdy: Back in Action!	United States	Traditional Animation
Cat Soup	Japan	Anime
Chirpy	United States	Traditional Animation
Das Rad	Germany	Stop-motion/puppet/computer
Digimon Adventure 02: Revenge of Diaboromon	Japan	Anime
Dog	United Kingdom	Stop-motion Animation
Donner	Canada, United States, Germany	Computer Animation
Eddy and the Bear	United Kingdom	Traditional Animation
Ferret and Parrot	United States	Traditional Animation
Fifty Percent Grey	Ireland	Computer Animation
Fuck Her Gently	United States	Flash Animation
Give Up Yer Aul Sins	Ireland	Traditional Animation
Glasses	Canada	Stop-motion Animation
Hamilton Mattress	United Kingdom	Stop-motion Animation
Home Road Movies	United Kingdom	Live-action/computer
Hubert's Brain	United States	Computer Animation
IMP, Inc.	United States	Traditional Animation
Intolerance II: The Invasion	United Kingdom	Cutout Animation
Ivor the Invisible	United Kingdom	Traditional Animation
The Jetsons: Father & Son Day	United States	Flash Animation
Kinnikuman: Second Generations	Japan	Anime
A Kitty Bobo Show	United States	Traditional Animation
Kujiratori	Japan	Anime
The Legend of the Three Trees	United States	Traditional Animation
Major Flake: Soggy Sale	United States	Traditional Animation
The Mansion Cat	United States	Traditional Animation
Mōtto! Ojamajo Doremi: Secret of the Frog Stone	Japan	Anime
The Mousochist	United States	Traditional Animation
My Freaky Family: Welcome to My World	United States	Traditional Animation
Night of the Living Doo	United States	Traditional Animation
No P in the OOL	United States	Traditional Animation
Not So Fast!: An Uncle Gus Cartoon	United States	Traditional Animation
The Santa Claus Brothers	United States	Computer Animation
Second Star to the Left	United States	Traditional Animation
Shh.	Australia	Traditional Animation
Shrek in the Swamp Karaoke Dance Party	United States	Computer Animation
Skeleton Key	United States	Traditional Animation
Slayers Premium	Japan	Anime
Strange Invaders	Canada	Traditional Animation
Swaroop: Bovine Bliss	United States	Traditional Animation
Telling Lies	United Kingdom	Experimental
The Toys That Rescued Christmas	United States	Computer Animation
Tuesday	United Kingdom	Traditional Animation
Utica Cartoon: Hotdog Champeen	United States	Traditional Animation
Le Vœu	France	Stop-motion Animation
The World of Interiors	United Kingdom	Traditional Animation
Yee Hah & Doo Dah	United States	Traditional Animation

== 2002 ==
Name	Country	Technique
Bagboy!	United States	Traditional Animation
Black Soul	Canada	Traditional Animation
Boo Boo and the Man	United States	Flash Animation
The Brainwashers	Canada	Stop-motion Animation
The Cathedral	Poland	Computer Animation
Chicken Scratch	United States	Traditional Animation
The Christmas Orange	Canada	Traditional Animation
The ChubbChubbs!	United States	Computer Animation
Colin Versus the World	United States	Traditional Animation
Commander Cork: Space Ranger	United States	Traditional Animation
Digimon Frontier: Island of Lost Digimon	Japan	Traditional Animation
Digimon Tamers: Runaway Locomon	Japan	Traditional Animation
The Dog Who Was a Cat Inside	United Kingdom	Cutout Animation
Fish Never Sleep	United Kingdom	Traditional Animation
Fungus Among Us	United States	Traditional Animation
Gone Nutty	United States	Computer Animation
The Groovenians	United States	Computer Animation
The Hungry Squid	Canada	Stop-motion Animation
Jeffrey Cat: Claw and Order	United States	Traditional Animation
The Jetsons: The Best Son	United States	Flash Animation
Killer Bean 3	United States	Computer Animation
Kinnikuman II Sei: Muscle Ginseng Competition! The Great Choujin War	Japan	Anime
Koro no Daisanpo	Japan	Anime
Kūsō no Sora Tobu Kikaitachi	Japan	Anime
Little Wolf's Book of Badness	United Kingdom	Traditional Animation
Longhair and Doubledome: Where There's Smoke... There's Bob!	United States	Traditional Animation
Maktar	United States	Traditional Animation
Mike's New Car	United States	Computer Animation
Mt. Head	Japan	Anime
Pirouette	Canada	Traditional Animation
Sap	United Kingdom	Traditional Animation
Sprout	United States	Computer Animation
There Was an Old Lady Who Swallowed a Fly	United States	Traditional Animation
Vacation	United Kingdom	Computer Animation
Voices of a Distant Star	Japan	Anime
War Game	United Kingdom	Traditional Animation
Wedding Espresso	United Kingdom	Traditional Animation
Welcome to Eltingville	United States	Traditional Animation
You Are Mine	United States	Computer Animation

== 2003 ==
Name	Country	Technique
The Astounding Talent of Mr. Grenade	United States	Computer animation
Boundin'	United States	Computer Animation
Captain Sturdy: The Originals	United States	Traditional Animation
Chase Me	United States	Traditional Animation
Citizen Tony	United States	Traditional Animation
Dad's Dead	United Kingdom	Computer Animation
Dear Sweet Emma	United States	Computer Animation
Destino	United States	Traditional/computer
Doggy Poo	South Korea	Stop-motion Animation
Early Bloomer	United States	Computer Animation
Falling in Love Again	Canada	Computer Animation
Fast Film	Austria, Germany, Luxembourg	Cutout Animation
The Ghost of Lord Farquaad	United States	Computer Animation
Harvie Krumpet	Australia	Stop-motion Animation
I Want a Dog	Canada	Flash Animation
Jo Jo in the Stars	United Kingdom	Computer Animation
Louise	Canada	Traditional Animation
Major Powers and the Star Squad	United States	Traditional Animation
Mei and the Kittenbus	Japan	Traditional Animation
My Little Pony: A Charming Birthday	United States	Traditional Animation
Nibbles	Canada	Traditional Animation
Noël Noël	Canada	Traditional Animation
Olympics	Italy	Flash Animation
Plumber	Canada	Computer Animation
La Souricière	France	Stop-motion Animation
Stinky Pierre	United States	Traditional Animation
Welcome to Tonka Town	United States	Traditional Animation
Whizzard of Ow	United States	Traditional Animation

== 2004 ==
Name	Country	Technique
Attack of the Drones	United States	Traditional Animation
The Ballad of Sheep 13	Canada	Traditional Animation
Birthday Boy	Australia	Computer Animation
The Chronicles of Riddick: Dark Fury	United States	Traditional Animation
City Paradise	United Kingdom	Live-action/computer/stop-motion/cutout
Cock-A-Doodle Duel	United States	Traditional Animation
Crawlspace	Australia	Computer Animation
Daffy Duck for President	United States	Traditional Animation
Desmond's Trashed Apple Tree	Sweden	Traditional Animation
A Diary Tale	United States	Flash Animation
Far Far Away Idol	United States	Computer Animation
Fallen Art	Poland	Computer Animation
Gopher Broke	United States	Computer Animation
Guard Dog	United States	Traditional Animation
Hare and Loathing in Las Vegas	United States	Traditional Animation
Heavy Pockets	United Kingdom	Cutout Animation
His Passionate Bride	United Kingdom	Traditional Animation
Intolerance III: The Final Solution	United Kingdom	Cutout Animation
John and Michael	Canada	Stop-motion Animation
Kakurenbo	Japan	Anime
King of Fools	Germany	Traditional Animation
The Little Reindeer	United Kingdom, France	Traditional Animation
Little Things	United Kingdom	Traditional Animation
Looo	Italy	Computer Animation
Lorenzo	United States	Traditional Animation
Mary	United States	Live-action/traditional
Mr. Otto in 17	Italy	Flash Animation
Museum Scream	United States	Traditional Animation
My Generation G-G-Gap	United States	Traditional Animation
My Little Pony: Dancing in the Clouds	United States	Traditional Animation
My Scene: Masquerade Madness	United States	Traditional Animation
One by One	United States	Traditional Animation
Periwinkle Around the World	United States	Traditional Animation
Polly Pocket: Lunar Eclipse	United States	Traditional Animation
Ryan	Canada	Live-action/computer/various in archival footage
A Single Tear	Canada	Cutout Animation
The Tale of Jack Frost	United Kingdom	Computer Animation
Tsuki no Waltz	Japan	Anime
Van Helsing: The London Assignment	United States	Traditional Animation
Weebles: Welcome to Weebleville!	United States	Computer Animation
What's Cooking?	United States	Traditional Animation

== 2005 ==
Name	Country	Technique
9	United States	Computer Animation
Aunt Fanny's Tour of Booty	United States	Computer Animation
Babak and Friends	United States	Traditional Animation
Badgered	United Kingdom	Traditional Animation
The Big Fall	Lebanon	Flash Animation
Catching	United States	Computer Animation
cNote	Canada	Computer Animation
Film Noir	United Kingdom	Cutout Animation
Fish Heads Fugue and Other Tales for Twilight	United States	Computer/stop-motion/cutout/puppet
Delivery	Germany	Computer Animation
Dr. Pinoko's Forest Adventure	Japan	Anime
I Like Pandas	United States	Flash Animation
Inside the CIA	United States	Traditional Animation
Jack-Jack Attack	United States	Computer Animation
The Karate Guard	United States	Traditional Animation
Kamiya's Correspondence	United Kingdom	Traditional Animation
Killcow	United States	Computer Animation
Last Order: Final Fantasy VII	Japan	Anime
Le Building	France	Traditional Animation
Lego Star Wars: Revenge of the Brick	United States	Computer Animation
The Madagascar Penguins in a Christmas Caper	United States	Computer Animation
Maestro	Hungary	Computer Animation
The Meaning of Life	United States	Traditional Animation
Mega Man X: The Day of Sigma	Japan	Anime
Moongirl	United States	Stop-motion Animation
The Moon and the Son: An Imagined Conversation	United States	Live-action/various
Life in Transition	United States	Traditional Animation
My Little Pony: Friends are Never Far Away	United States	Traditional Animation
The Mysterious Geographic Explorations of Jasper Morello	Australia	Cutout Animation
The Naive Man from Lolliland	United States	Traditional Animation
Negadon: The Monster from Mars	Japan	Anime
One Man Band	United States	Computer Animation
Polly Pocket: 2 Cool at the Pocket Plaza	United States	Traditional Animation
Rabbit	United Kingdom	Cutout Animation
Tower Bawher	Canada	Abstract Animation
Tragic Story with Happy Ending	Canada, France, Portugal	Traditional Animation
Weebles: Sharing in the Fun!	United States	Computer Animation

== 2006 ==
Name	Country	Technique
2 in the AM PM	United States	Traditional Animation
The Amazing Screw-On Head	United States	Traditional Animation
Android 207	Canada	Stop-motion Animation
The Aroma of Tea	Netherlands	Traditional Animation
The Danish Poet	Canada, Norway	Traditional Animation
Digimon Savers: Ultimate Power! Burst Mode Activated!!	Japan	Anime
Digimon Savers 3D: The Digital World in Imminent Danger!	Japan	Anime
Dreams And Desires: Family Ties	United Kingdom	Traditional Animation
Everything Will Be OK	United States	Traditional Animation
First Flight	United States	Computer Animation
Flutter	Canada	Traditional Animation
The Girl Who Hated Books	Canada	Traditional Animation
Guy 101	United States	Computer Animation
Hammy's Boomerang Adventure	United States	Computer Animation
Hoshi o Katta Hi	Japan	Anime
Imaginary Friend	United States	Flash Animation
Jeu	Canada, Switzerland	Abstract Animation
Korgoth of Barbaria	United States	Traditional Animation
Lego Batman: Bricks, Bats & Bad Guys	United States	Computer Animation
Lifted	United States	Computer Animation
Lily to Kaeru to Otōto	Japan	Traditional Animation
The Little Matchgirl	United States	Traditional Animation
Looking for a Home	Japan	Anime
Mater and the Ghostlight	United States	Computer Animation
McLaren's Negatives	Canada	Live-action/cutout
Mizugumo Monmon	Japan	Anime
My Love	Russia	Paint-on-glass
The Night of Taneyamagahara	Japan	Anime
No Time for Nuts	United States	Computer Animation
The Passenger	Australia	Computer Animation
Peter and the Wolf	Norway, Mexico, Poland, Switzerland, United Kingdom	Stop-motion Animation
Pirate Baby's Cabana Battle Street Fight 2006	Australia	Anime
The Sparky Book	Canada	Live-action/cutout
Welcome to Wackamo	United States	Traditional Animation
The Wraith of Cobble Hill	United States	Stop-motion Animation
Yonna in the Solitary Fortress	Japan	Anime

== 2007 ==
Name	Country	Technique
Barrista	United States	Traditional Animation
Boog and Elliot's Midnight Bun Run	United States	Computer Animation
The Chestnut Tree	United States	Traditional Animation
The ChubbChubbs Save Xmas	United States	Computer Animation
A Country Doctor	Japan	Anime
The Crumblegiant	Ireland	Traditional Animation
Eko Eko Azarak	Japan	Traditional Animation
Even Pigeons Go to Heaven	France	Computer Animation
Freedom Dance	United States	Live-action/traditional
Head Over Heels	United Kingdom	Traditional Animation
How to Hook Up Your Home Theater	United States	Traditional Animation
I Met the Walrus	Canada	Flash Animation
Jungle Jail	France	Computer Animation
Lavatory – Lovestory	Russia	Traditional Animation
Madame Tutli-Putli	Canada	Stop-motion Animation
The Modifyers	United States	Traditional Animation
Oktapodi	France	Computer Animation
The Pearce Sisters	United Kingdom	Traditional Animation
Shrek the Halls	United States	Computer Animation
Sleeping Betty	Canada	Traditional Animation
Yellow Sticky Notes	Canada	Traditional Animation
Your Friend the Rat	United States	Computer Animation

== 2008 ==
Name	Country	Technique
BURN-E	United States	Computer Animation
The Butterfly from Ural	Finland	Stop-motion Animation
Chatura Kau	India	Flash Animation
Codswallop	United Kingdom	Traditional Animation
Dragon Ball: Yo! Son Goku and His Friends Return!!	Japan	Anime
Drux Flux	Canada	Abstract Animation
Dog of Man	United Kingdom	Flash Animation
El Materdor	United States	Computer Animation
Elefun and Friends: A Tangled Tale	United States	Flash Animation
Ex-Et	France	Computer Animation
French Roast	France	Computer Animation
Glago's Guest	United States	Computer Animation
Granny O'Grimm's Sleeping Beauty	Ireland	Computer/Flash
How People Got Fire	Canada	Rotoscope
Lego Indiana Jones and the Raiders of the Lost Brick	Denmark	Computer Animation
La Maison en Petits Cubes	Japan	Anime
Mater the Greater	United States	Computer Animation
A Matter of Loaf and Death	United Kingdom	Stop-motion Animation
The Necktie	Canada	Computer Animation
Presto	United States	Computer Animation
Rescue Squad Mater	United States	Computer Animation
Secrets of the Furious Five	United States	Computer Animation
Surviving Sid	United States	Computer Animation
This Way Up	United Kingdom	Computer Animation
Tokyo Mater	United States	Computer Animation
Tomboy	Canada	Traditional Animation
Varmints	United Kingdom	Computer Animation

== 2009 ==
Name	Country	Technique
All in the Bunker	United States	Computer Animation
Alma	Spain	Computer Animation
ALARM	South-Korea	Computer Animation
B.O.B.'s Big Break	United States	Computer Animation
The Bolt Who Screwed Christmas	United States	Traditional Animation
The Cat Piano	Australia	Traditional Animation
Dug's Special Mission	United States	Computer Animation
Fishing with Sam	Norway	Computer Animation
George and A.J.	United States	Flash Animation
Gift of the Hoopoe	Saudi Arabia	Traditional Animation
Git Gob	Canada	Stop Motion
The Happy Duckling	United Kingdom	Cutout/computer
The Gruffalo	Germany, United Kingdom	Computer Animation
Judas & Jesus	Germany	Traditional Animation
Kowarekake no Orgel	Japan	Anime
The Lady and the Reaper	Spain	Computer Animation
Lego Star Wars: The Quest for R2-D2	United States	Computer Animation
Let's Pollute	United States	Flash Animation
Logorama	France	Computer Animation
Merry Madagascar	United States	Computer Animation
Monsters vs. Aliens: Mutant Pumpkins from Outer Space	United States	Computer Animation
Ollie & the Baked Halibut	Canada	Computer Animation
Partly Cloudy	United States	Computer Animation
Prep & Landing	United States	Computer Animation
Ravex in Tezuka World	Japan, United States	Anime
Rinky Dink	United States	Stop Motion/Traditional
Rocket the Reindeer	United Kingdom	Computer Animation
Runaway	Canada	Traditional Animation
Super Rhino	United States	Computer Animation
Singles	United States	Traditional Animation
The Spine	Canada	Computer Animation
Unidentified Flying Mater	United States	Computer Animation
When I am Sad	United States	Traditional Animation
