= Yamase =

Yamase (written: 山瀬) is a Japanese surname. Notable people with the surname include:

- Koji Yamase (山瀬 功治, born 1981), Japanese footballer
- Rio Yamase (山瀬 理桜), Japanese musician
- Yukihiro Yamase (山瀬 幸宏, born 1984), Japanese footballer

== See also ==
- Yamase Station, a railway station in Yoshinogawa, Tokushima Prefecture, Japan
- Yamase Building, a building in Waimea, Kauai County, Hawaii
