= Nezumi no Sumō =

Japanese folk tale

Nezumi no Sumō ねずみのすもう

Folk tale
- Name: Nezumi no Sumō ねずみのすもう
- Country: Japan
- Related: A Sumo Wrestler's Tail

Nezumi no Sumō (ねずみのすもう or ねずみの相撲; lit. "Rat's/Mouse's Sumo") is a Japanese folk tale. It tells the story of an old man and his wife who help out some mice who engage in sumo. As a reward, one of the mice gives them enough gold to live out their lives.

Many individual books and story collections have included this story. Nezumi no Sumō was animated as episode 42 of ''Manga Nihon Mukashi Banashi'' in 1976 on MBS. Studio Ghibli released a 13-minute short film in 2010 titled A Sumo Wrestler's Tail based on this folk tale. The film shows at the Ghibli Museum in Mitaka.

== Story ==
The story focuses on an old couple living at the base of a mountain. One day, the old man heads up the mountain in order to cut some firewood. While performing this task, he hears a chorus of strange voices chanting. Thinking this is mysterious, the old man follows the chant through the thicket until he comes to the middle of the woods, where - in the middle of a clearing - a sumo ring has been set up. In this ring, a slender mouse and a much larger mouse are locked in a sumo match. The old man, fascinated, watches the match intently, and he suddenly realises that the slender mouse is one which lives in his house, while the fatter mouse lives in the house of a local rich man. He cheers the slender mouse on, but due to its weakness and small stature it is quickly flung out of the ring by the larger mouse, much to the man's dismay.

Returning home after the match, the old man tearfully tells his wife of the sumo match, lamenting the fact that he has no delicious food to offer to the mouse in order to build its strength. His wife, touched by the story, decides that the two together would take the rice they had saved for New Year and make some rice cakes for the mouse. They leave the rice cakes on a shelf for the mouse to find, and come morning find they have been taken. The old couple are satisfied by this, confident that the rice cakes will have added to the mouse's power.

That day, the old man once again goes up the mountain in order to cut firewood. Again, he hears the strange chanting and realizes that another sumo match is taking place. He hurries to the clearing to watch as the fat mouse and the slender mouse start their match. This time, the slender mouse is easily able to fling the larger mouse out of the ring. Angered, the larger mouse calls for a rematch, but is swiftly beaten again and again. The large mouse curses the smaller mouse and demands to know how he has suddenly become so strong. The slender mouse replies that he got strong from eating rice cakes, and the larger mouse responds that though his household is rich they are also stingy and do not spare such hearty fare. He asks to come to the old couple's house in order to eat rice cakes with the slender mouse, and the slender mouse agrees on the condition that he bring a large sum of money.

The old man hurries back down the mountain to tell his wife of what he witnessed, and she replies that they should take all of their rice and make rice cakes for the rodents, adding hopefully that they can make do without the rice until the new year. In addition to the rice cakes, the old woman leaves out two loincloths for the mice. Upon waking the next morning, the old couple find both the rice cakes and the loincloths absent, and the old man excitedly prepares to go up the mountain to witness the next sumo match. Before he leaves, he notices three gold coins in the corner of the room. Surprised, he calls his wife and tells her they must have been left by the mouse from the rich man's house.

The old couple set off together to cut firewood and once again the strange chanting can be heard. The two hurry to the clearing to watch the match, and see two mice in red loincloths grappling. The match goes on for a long time, with both mice being too strong to be toppled by the other. The old couple watch the match continue until evening, and then return home content that they have done a good deed. With the money left by the rich man's mouse, the two live happily ever after.

== Adaptations ==
Nezumi no Sumō has been adapted and retold many times.

=== Film and television ===
- A Sumo Wrestler's Tail (2010, Studio Ghibli)
- Episode 42 of ''Manga Nihon Mukashi Banashi'' (aired 20 March 1976, MBS)

=== Literature ===
Some publications of this story are given below. Title is given only when it differs from the one used in this article. Listed chronologically.

- Nezumi no Sumō (ネズミノスマフ or ネヅミノスマフ) (Note: "Sumō" is written in katakana in an old way here: スマフ (sumafu). The NDL entries indicates it is read as "sumō". "Nezumi" is written both as ネズミノスマフ and ネヅミノスマフ (difference in bold).) by Jōji Tsubota (April 1944, Hōreikan Enomoto Shoten)
- Nezumi no Sumō (ネズミノスマフ, Nezumi no Sumō) (Note: "Sumō" is written in katakana in an old way here: スマフ (sumafu). The NDL entries indicates it is read as "sumō".) by Dōji Akimura (April 1946, Shiratori Shobō)
- By Kōji Uno (1948, Sakurai Shoten)
- By Toshiko Kanzawa (July 1983, Kaiseisha, ISBN 403337020X)
- By Atsushi Higuchi (樋口淳) (July 1986, Holp Shuppan, ISBN 4593562252)
- By Yōko Imoto (May 2000, Iwasaki Publishing, ISBN 4265030750)
- By Toshio Ozawa (おざわとしお) (October 2005, Kumon Publishing, ISBN 4774311022)
- By Hatsue Nakawaki (October 2020, Poplar Publishing, ISBN 9784591166871)
- By Keiichi Sugiyama (杉山径一) (November 2023, Child Honsha, ISBN 978-4-8054-4974-5)
- By Toshio Ozawa (October 2024, Sekai Bunka Wonder Group)
