= Crawlspace (disambiguation) =

A crawl space is a narrow opening underneath the bottom of a building.

Crawl space or Crawlspace may also refer to:

== Film ==
- Crawlspace (1972 film), a made-for-TV movie starring Arthur Kennedy
- Crawlspace (1986 film), a horror/thriller film starring Klaus Kinski
- Crawlspace (2004 film), an animated short film by Peter Sved
- Crawlspace (2012 film), an Australian science fiction film directed by Justin Dix
- Crawlspace (2013 film), an American horror/thriller film directed by Josh Stolberg
- Crawlspace (2016 film), an American horror/thriller film starring Michael Vartan
- Crawlspace (2022 film), an American and Canadian film directed by L. Gustavo Cooper starring Henry Thomas

== Music ==
- Crawlspace (band), an Australian rock band
- Crawl Space (album), a 1977 album by trumpeter Art Farmer
- Sevendust, an American hard rock band formerly known as Crawlspace
- "Crawlspace", a song by The Beastie Boys from To the 5 Boroughs

== Television ==
- "Crawl Space" (Bob's Burgers), an episode of the TV series Bob's Burgers
- "Crawl Space" (Breaking Bad), an episode of the TV series Breaking Bad
- "Crawlspace" was the original name of "The Space" which is a children's programing block on TVOKids portion of TV Ontario.

== Other media ==
- "Crawl Space" the first story arc in the comic series XXXombies written by Rick Remender, Tony Moore and Kieron Dwyer
