= Naohisa Inoue =

Japanese painter (born 1948)

- Born: 井上直久; 1948 (age 77–78); Osaka, Japan
- Movement: Fantasy art, surrealism

Upward Draft, one of Inoue's paintings which inspired scenes in the film Whisper of the Heart.

Naohisa Inoue (井上 直久, Inoue Naohisa; born in 1948 in Osaka, Japan) is a fantasy artist influenced by both the Surrealism and Impressionism movements. Most of his paintings are set in the fantastical land of Iblard (イバラード, Ibarādo). He created reference and background art for the Studio Ghibli film Whisper of the Heart and also provided a cameo appearance as the voice of Minami. More recently, his works were given a more direct adaptation in the short film The Day I Harvested a Star (星をかった日, Hoshi o Katta Hi) which is shown exclusively at the Ghibli Museum. He directed the 2007 OVA Iblard Jikan, produced by Studio Ghibli.

Inoue is currently a professor at Seian University of Art and Design.

He attended the Kanazawa College of Art from 1971 to 1973.
