= Boro the Caterpillar =

2018 Japanese animated short film

Kemushi no Boro
- Promotional poster
- Japanese: 毛虫のボロ
- Directed by: Hayao Miyazaki
- Written by: Hayao Miyazaki
- Produced by: Toshio Suzuki
- Starring: Tamori
- Cinematography: Atsushi Okui
- Music by: Joe Hisaishi
- Production company: Studio Ghibli
- Distributed by: Ghibli Museum
- Release date: 21 March 2018
- Running time: 14 minutes
- Country: Japan
- Language: Japanese

Boro the Caterpillar (Japanese: 毛虫のボロ, Hepburn: Kemushi no Boro) is a 2018 Japanese animated short film written and directed by Hayao Miyazaki made for the Ghibli Museum. The story is about a recently hatched caterpillar named Boro as he takes his first steps into the world.

The short film is shown only in the Ghibli Museum and in Ghibli Park, where it premiered on 21 March 2018. It had its international premiere at the 2024 Cannes Film Festival, as part of the Studio Ghibli's Honorary Palme d'Or celebrations.

== Production ==
The origin of Boro the Caterpillar stemmed from sketches that Miyazaki had made in 1995. Miyazaki first brought up Boro as a potential idea for a movie, but Ghibli producer Toshio Suzuki, concerned about the difficulty of making a feature-length film with no human characters, proposed creating Princess Mononoke instead.

Following the release of The Wind Rises in 2013, Miyazaki announced his retirement. However, sensing that Miyazaki still wanted to work on projects, Suzuki asked the retired director if he would be interested in creating a short film using his Boro the Caterpillar idea. In 2015, Miyazaki came out of retirement to work on a roughly ten-minute short film for exclusive screening at the Ghibli Museum. Miyazaki described the plot of Boro the Caterpillar as being about "a story of a tiny, hairy caterpillar, so tiny that it may be easily squished between your fingers".

While Miyazaki had previously incorporated computer-generated images into earlier, hand-drawn films like Spirited Away, Boro the Caterpillar was Miyazaki's first work to incorporate a CG animated main character. Suzuki encouraged the shift to CGI, believing the technical challenge might reignite Miyazaki's passion. Miyazaki himself stated that "I have ideas I may not be able to draw by hand, and [CGI] may be a way to do it—that's my hope. It's a new technology". Given the choice by Suzuki, Miyazaki selected a team of Japanese CGI animators instead of working with Pixar under John Lasseter, as the former would be able to speak Japanese. On September 21, 2015, CG animator Yuhei Sakuragi announced that he would be helping Miyazaki complete Boro the Caterpillar. The production of the film was partially documented in the NHK-produced documentary Never-Ending Man: Hayao Miyazaki released in 2016.

Japanese television host and comedian Tamori provided all voices and sound effects for Boro the Caterpillar. The piano song at the end of the short film was performed by longtime Ghibli collaborator Joe Hisaishi.

== Release ==
Toshio Suzuki initially stated that Boro the Caterpillar was due for a July 2017 release. It eventually premiered at the Ghibli Museum on March 21, 2018.
