= The Story of Yanagawa's Canals =

Documentary film by Studio Ghibli

Japanese name
- Kanji: 柳川堀割物語
Transcriptions
- Revised Hepburn: Yanagawa Horiwari Monogatari
- Directed by: Isao Takahata
- Written by: Isao Takahata
- Produced by: Susumu Kubo
- Cinematography: Somai Takahashi
- Music by: Michio Mamiya
- Production companies: Studio Ghibli; Nibariki
- Distributed by: NHK
- Release date: 15 August 1987
- Running time: 167 minutes
- Country: Japan
- Language: Japanese

The Story of Yanagawa's Canals (Japanese: 柳川堀割物語, Hepburn: Yanagawa Horiwari Monogatari) is a 1987 live-action animated documentary directed by Isao Takahata and originally broadcast on NHK. The film details the history of the city of Yanagawa, Fukuoka and its inhabitant's struggle to preserve its signature canals from the devastating effects of water pollution.

Funded using the profits from Hayao Miyazaki’s Nausicaä of the Valley of the Wind, the film marks a number of significant firsts for Studio Ghibli. It was Takahata’s first directorial feature for the studio, which he co-founded with Miyazaki and producer Toshio Suzuki in 1985. Furthermore, the film remains the first and only majority live-action Studio Ghibli film to date, aside from a select instance in Pom Poko. The film also has the added feature of being the only Studio Ghibli to be produced independently, with the majority of financing and distribution being handled by Miyazaki’s personal office.

== Synopsis ==
At its heart, the film traces the history of the canal system, the restoration of Yanagawa, and the science behind it, as well as its impacts on the following generations. It explores the day-to-day lives of the community of Yanagawa and their struggle to preserve the famous canal system from water pollution and falling into disuse. Beginning with the canal’s origins from the 16th century to the 1970s, a great emphasis is placed on the mantra of ‘Living with Nature, disposing of waste by recycling,’ which became a central focal point in the community's struggle to preserve the waterway system.

The central figure of the documentary is Tsutae Hiromatsu, the head of the local water supply division, who is initially tasked with overseeing the canal's removal and repurposing, but upon hearing of its importance to the local community decides to mobilize them and the local government into supporting his “Water Clean-up project” to restore them to their former glory.

The film itself is divided into eleven chapters and a prologue that follows the efforts to repair the canal systems. Each chapter features a mixture of talking heads, observational shooting, and explanatory narration interspersed with Miyazaki's animation:

- Prologue
- Chapter 1 Horiwari is alive—Waterway pointillism--
- Chapter 2 Water Pumping Station and Moat Edge - Characteristics and Utilization of Waterway Network-
- Chapter 3 Yanagawa 3rd Year Higo March—Mechanism of Waterway-
- Chapter 4 Fukuoka Prefectural Ordinance Drinking River Control Regulations-When the waterways were clean-
- Chapter 5 The Age of Archipelago Remodeling-The Devastation of Waterways-
- Chapter 6 Plains Created by the Sea ――The Nature of Horiwari ――
- Chapter 7 "Making Water"—Completion of Water Use System--
- Chapter 8 A Drop of Water Is A Drop of Blood-Yabe River Water Conflict-
- Chapter 9 Direct Appeal and Decision-Toward Waterway Regeneration-
- Chapter 10 Living Together by Making the Most of Nature-Shirobori Waterfall-
- Chapter 11 Solidarity between Residents and Government—History of Waterway Regeneration—

== Production ==
After the success of Nausicaä of the Valley of the Wind, attention immediately turned to another collaboration between Miyazaki as director and Takahata and Suzuki as producers. Tokuma Shoten, the production company behind Nausicaä, had originally pushed for a sequel to the film but Miyazaki resisted, citing tiredness and frustration with the project. Miyazaki was inspired to work on another project by an old childhood visit to Minamata Bay on the west coast of Kyushu, whose waters had been polluted by various chemical toxins and resulted in the local population feeling unwell.

Miyazaki traveled to Yanagawa – the “Venice of the East” - in order to find inspiration for his next animated feature film along with lifelong collaborator Takahata. Miyazaki had considered the tranquil setting of Yanagawa suitable for a story about young school children and man's relationship with the natural world, similar to his previous work.

Takahata was enlisted to serve as a location scout for the project and spent the months following his arrival exploring not only the waterways themselves via donkobune (narrow riverboats) but also the surrounding areas and people to whom the canal was a sense of unity and civic pride. When Takahata met Tsutae Hiromatsu, the head of water supply in the region, he decided to focus his attention on making a documentary about the community's efforts to preserve the waterways, dropping the animated aspects almost entirely.

Returning to Tokyo, Takahata agreed with Miyazaki and Suzuki on a budget of ¥30 million (half the profits of Nausicaä) to make the film. The film was produced by Hayao Miyazaki's personal office Nibariki, with Miyazaki himself contributing to the film's animated sequences depicting life prior to the modern age. The film used a combination of stop motion, aerial photography and traditional animation. Takahata went over the film's budget, and it had to be completed using Miyazaki's personal savings.

A deadline of one year was agreed upon, however, the production took three years to complete, going both over budget and over the agreed deadline. Takahata felt it necessary to return to Yanagawa multiple times in order to authentically portray both the living culture of the canal and the struggle of the people to fight against the efforts of the local authority to abandon the canal and waterways to pollution and disuse.

The film going over budget and the increasing prospect of it not making a return on investment prompted Miyazaki to begin working on what would eventually become Laputa: Castle in the Sky in order to cover the cost of Takahata's production, a mutually beneficial relationship which would continue throughout the rest of their time together. As Studio Ghibli producer Toshio Suzuki later remarked, "If Takahata had made his movie on schedule, Laputa wouldn't have been born."

== Themes ==
Like many of Takahata's later works, The Story of Yanagawa’s Canals touches upon themes such as humanity's relationship to nature, environmentalism, industrialization, nostalgia, and the importance and value of community. Throughout the film, there is great attention given to the local culture of Yanagawa. Examples include Shinto moat-drying parties, kappa legends, and celebratory Okinohata festivals. Poetry by Hakushū Kitahara is also featured throughout the film, echoing Takahata's later use of it in My Neighbors the Yamadas.

== Release ==
The film was broadcast on NHK on August 15, 1987. A localized Japanese DVD was released on December 5, 2003. Since the release of the DVD, however, there have been no further releases or reissues of the film.

== Reception ==
Outside of Japan and the film's initial broadcast, The Story of Yanagawa’s Canals has received very little attention from both fans and critics alike, outside of works dedicated to Takahata's career.

In the years since its release, however, the film has received increased critical attention from those in the west. It was screened at the Academy Museum of Motion Pictures in 2022 as part of a retrospective exhibition on the films of Isao Takahata. In one of the few English language publications to discuss The Story of Yanagawa’s Canals, for example, Colin Odell and Michelle Le Blanc write that:

Although unlikely to appeal to the broader audience for Ghibli’s animated films, The Story of the Yanagawa Canals is nevertheless an interesting work because it focuses on many of the themes that pepper Takahata’s anime. Visually, his use of relational editing and slow tracking shots recalls the similar style of his more controlled works, but, despite being a very low-key and personal film, it is one that celebrates the wider spirit of community.

Alex Dudok de Wit of Cartoon Brew described it as "Takahata’s most meditative work — and his most pedantic."

== See also ==
- List of Studio Ghibli works
