= Ghibli Park =

Studio Ghibli-themed amusement park in Nagakute, Japan

- Interactive map of Ghibli Park
- Location: Nagakute, Aichi, Japan
- Coordinates: 35.1725°N 137.0898°E
- Status: Operating
- Opened: 1 November 2022
- Theme: Studio Ghibli
- Area: 7.1 ha (18 acres)
- Website: ghibli-park.jp

Ghibli Park (ジブリパーク, Jiburipāku) is a theme park in Nagakute, Aichi, Japan. It opened on 1 November 2022 and features attractions based on several of the movies produced by Studio Ghibli. First announced in 2017, with construction starting in 2020, the park is located within the grounds of the Expo 2005 Aichi Commemorative Park. It is mainly accessible via the Aichikyūhaku-kinen-kōen Station, which is a railway station at the park entrance. This is the primary place of access as there is no private parking lot for the park. The park will cover 7.1 ha (18 acres) when it is fully complete.

== History ==
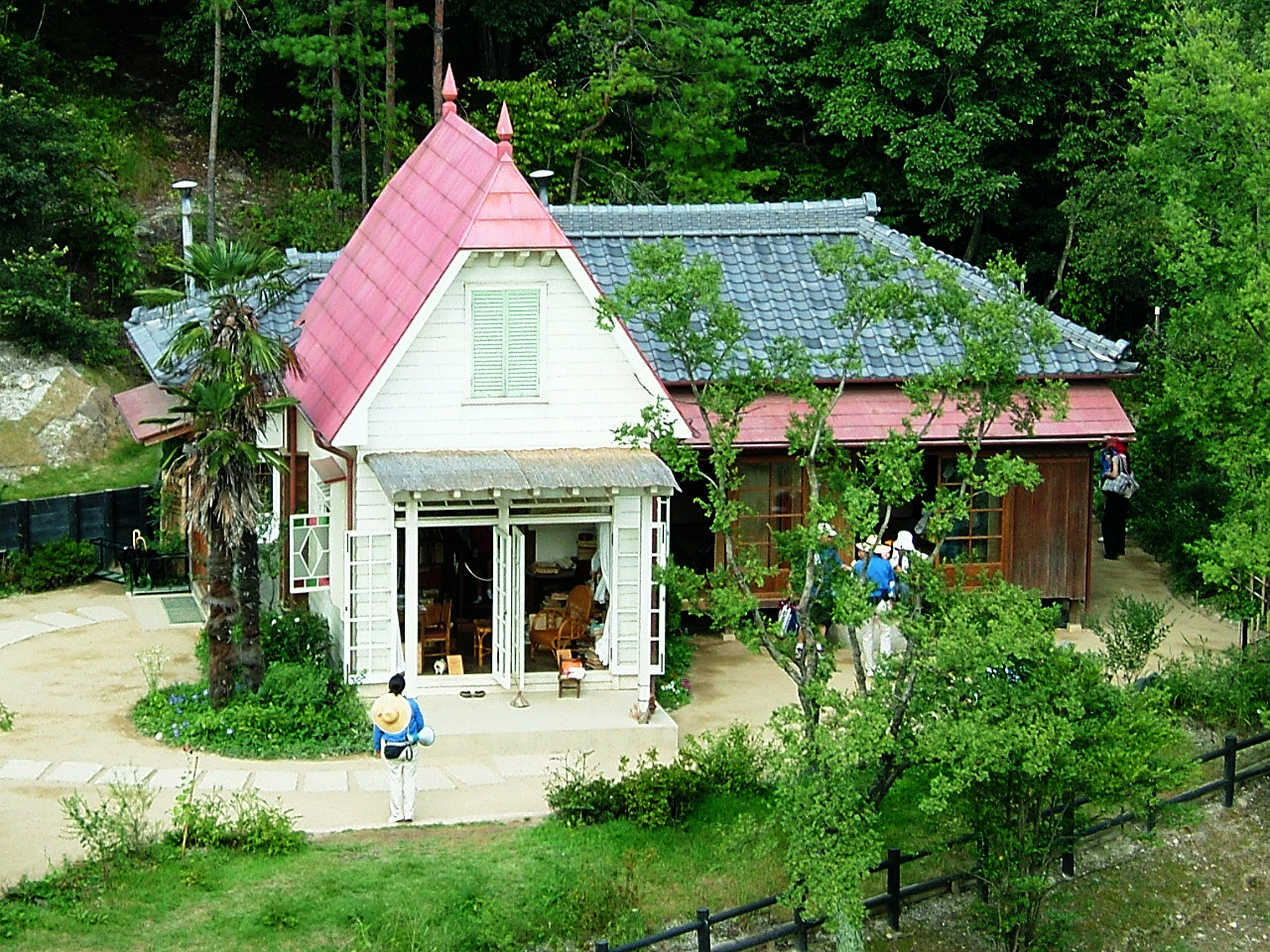
The replica house from My Neighbor Totoro

Plans for the theme park were first announced in 2017 by Toshio Suzuki, the producer of several of Studio Ghibli's movies, saying the attraction was planned to open in 2020. According to the original announcement, the park would focus entirely on the world of My Neighbor Totoro. The location chosen was the Aichi's Expo Park, which hosted the World Expo 2005, and already contains a replica of the house of the main characters of My Neighbor Totoro. The area, also known as Moricoro Park, was previously chosen to host two exhibitions of the studio, the first in 2008 and the second in 2015.

In 2019, further information about the state of the theme park was announced, including Studio Ghibli's partnership with the Aichi Prefecture and the Chunichi Shimbun newspaper. The new plans included the addition of four other areas to the park based on the other movies by the studio, and a new opening date of late 2022 was given. Hayao Miyazaki, co-founder of Studio Ghibli, was said to be taking part in the planning of the park. Hayao's son, Goro Miyazaki, is the park's director and lead designer.

In February 2022, it was announced the park would open on 1 November 2022. At the time of its opening, three locations would be available: the "Ghibli's Grand Warehouse", "Hill of Youth", and "Dondoko Forest". The second phase of constructions, planned to be concluded late 2023, would add the "Valley of Witches" and "Mononoke Village". In June 2022, it was announced that the opening of the Valley of Witches area would be delayed to March 2024. It was also announced that there would be a free area next to Mononoke Village, which would house a playground based on The Cat Returns for anyone to play in without charge.

== Themed areas ==
The park is based around five main themed areas, which are based around different Ghibli movies and are located within the grounds and buildings of Expo 2005. Those five areas are: Ghibli's Grand Warehouse, The Hill of Youth, Dondoko Forest, Mononoke Village and Valley of Witches.

=== Ghibli's Grand Warehouse ===
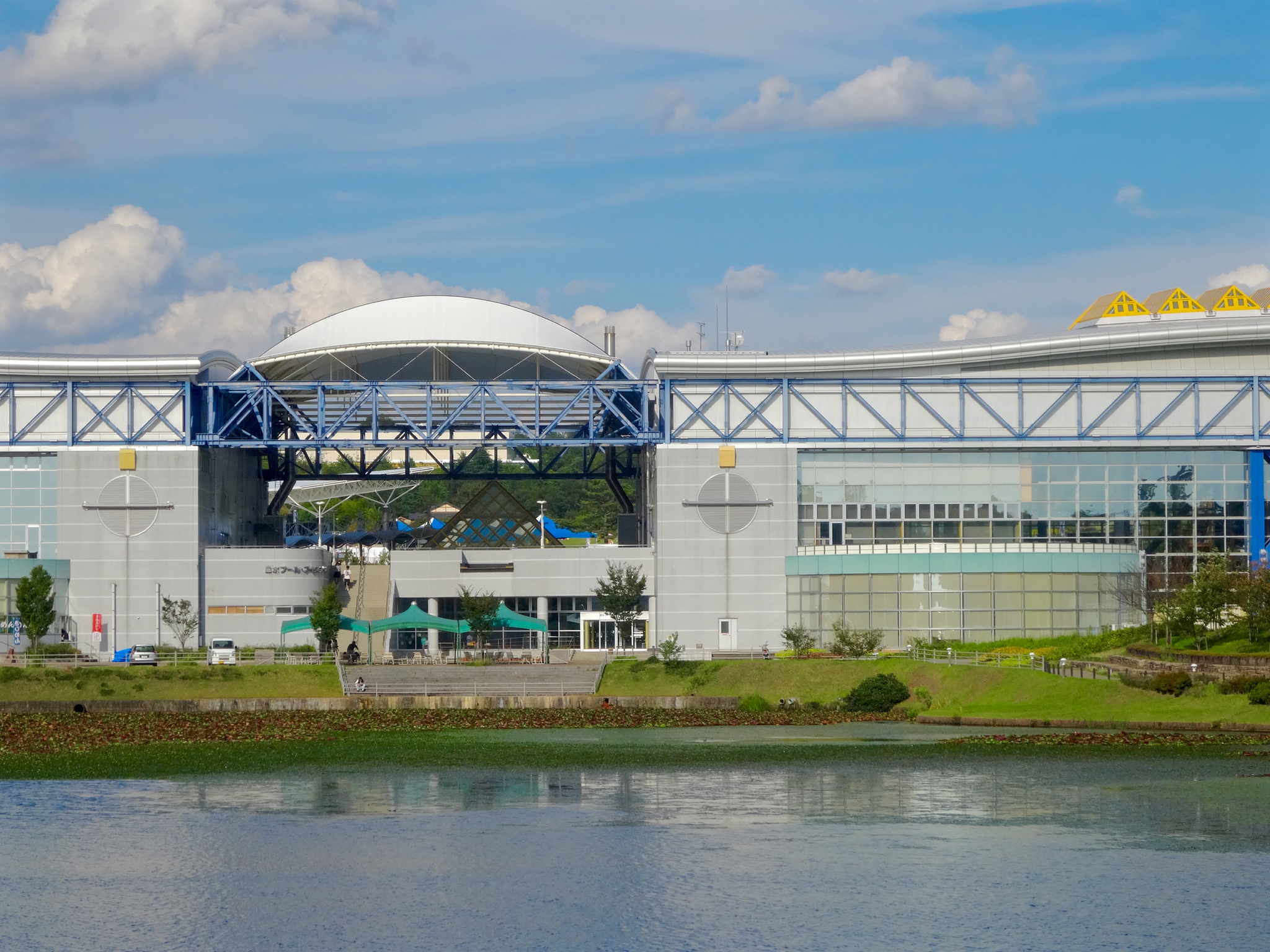
The heated pool from Expo 2005 (the site of Ghibli's Grand Warehouse) seen in 2015

Ghibli's Grand Warehouse (ジブリの大倉庫) replaced the heated swimming pool, which closed in 2018. The Air Destroyer Goliath, which is 6 meters long, and the ruined gardens from Castle in the Sky appear at the Grand Warehouse. Inside are numerous walkthrough exhibitions, including a lengthy series of scene recreations from the studio's filmography designed for photo opportunities.

Inside is the Cinema Orion, which shows short films that can only be watched there and in Tokyo's Ghibli Museum.

=== Hill of Youth ===
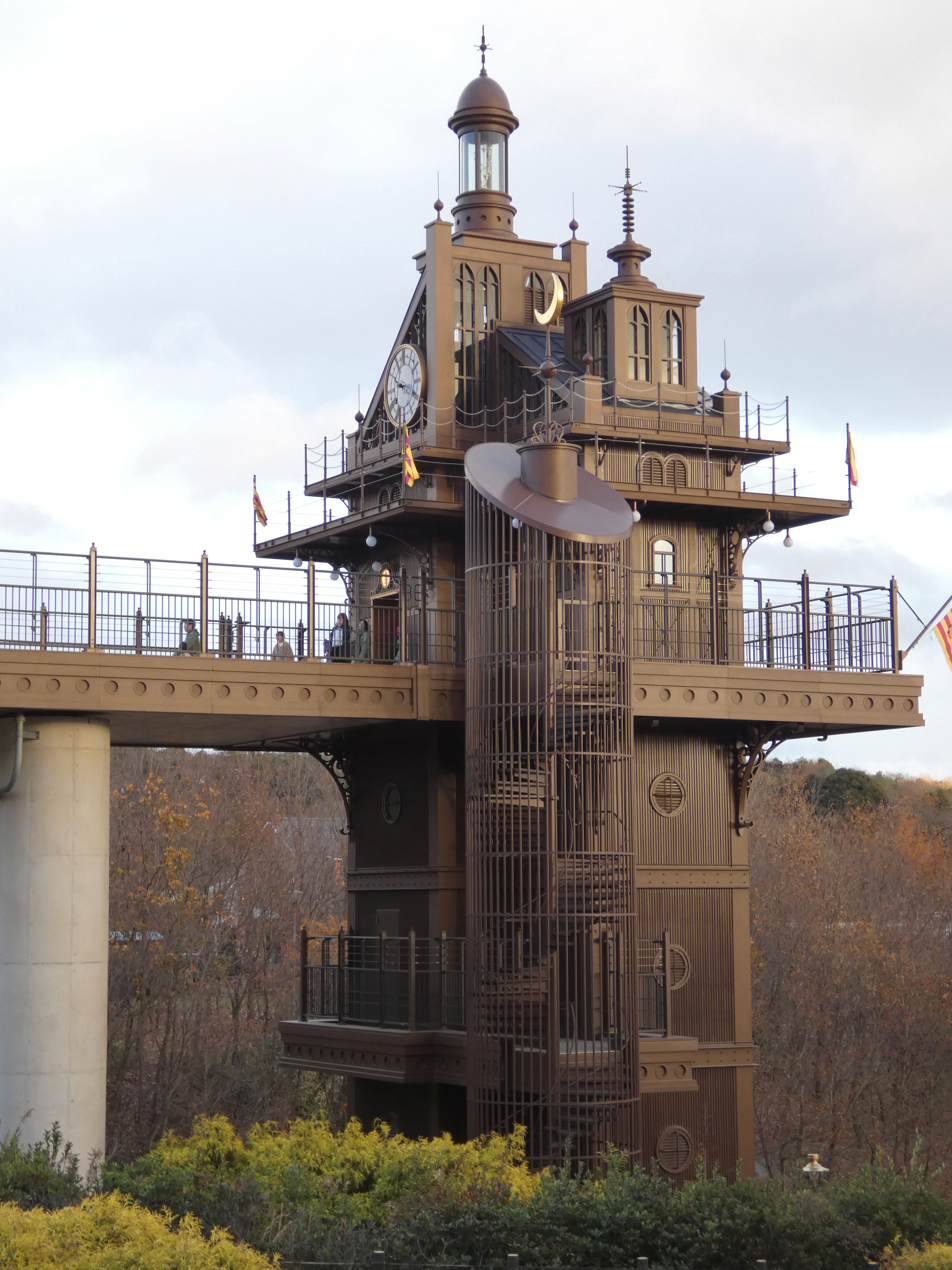
The tower in the Hill Of Youth

Hill of Youth (青春の丘) is mainly based around the film Howl's Moving Castle, with an observation tower styled to the time period the film is set in. This area also features "World Emporium", which is the antique shop from Whisper of the Heart, as well as the "Cat Bureau" from The Cat Returns, which is recreated as a cat-sized building.

=== Dondoko Forest ===
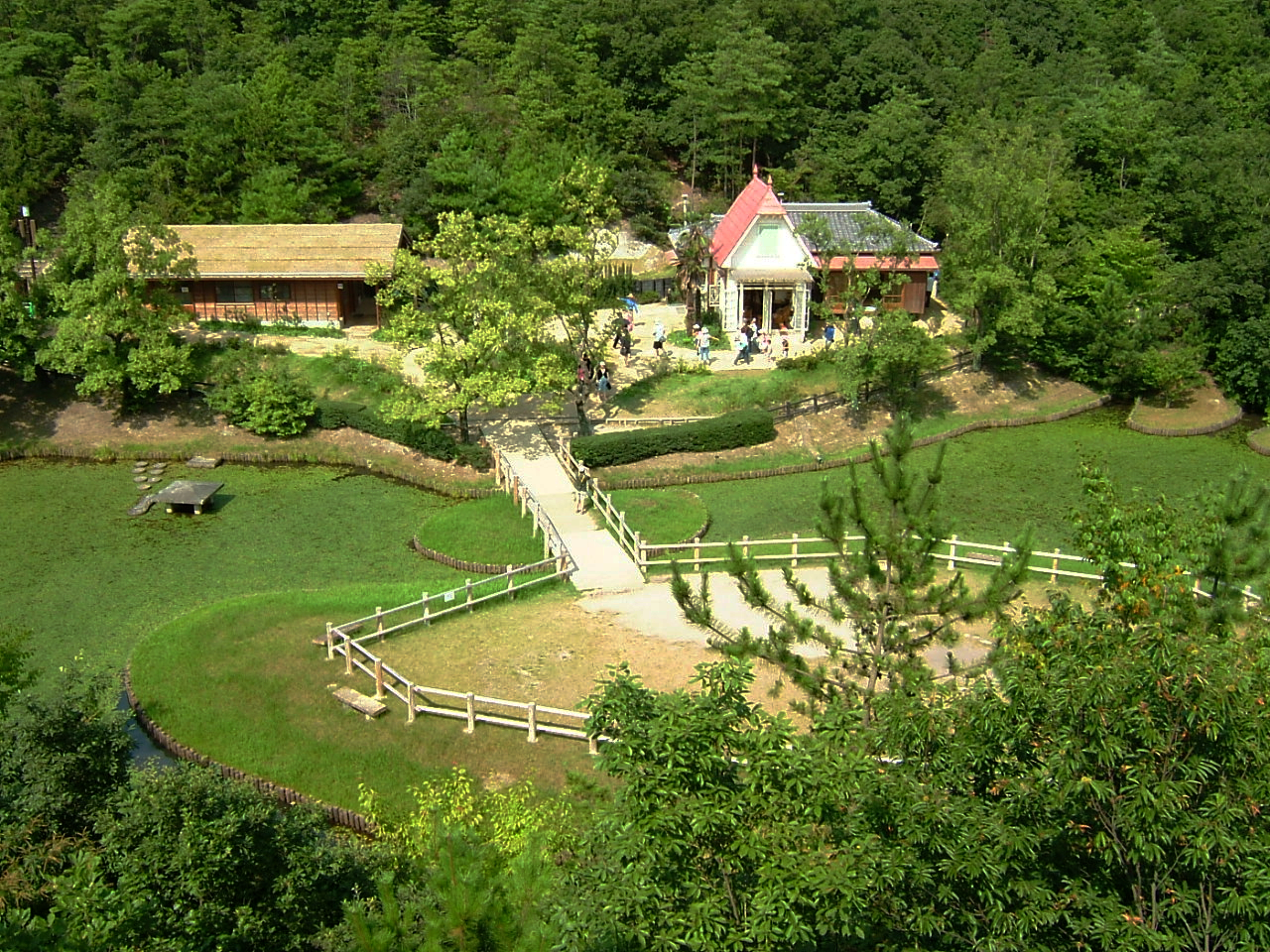
The Kusakabe's house in 2005

Dondoko Forest (どんどこ森) is the location of Satsuki and Mei Kusakabe's house from My Neighbor Totoro, which was already built from Expo 2005. The house closed in November 2021 for renovation works, and reopened with the rest of the park. The name of this area comes from the "Dondoko Odori" dance performed by Satsuki, Mei, and Totoro during a scene from the film. There is also a wooden playground on the hill behind the house, which is mentioned on the park's website as "'Dondoko-do' awaits you at the top of the forest hill that sits behind Satsuki and Mei's House".

=== Mononoke Village ===
Mononoke Village represents, as its name suggests, Princess Mononoke. It is based on the film's settings such as Irontown and Emishi Village. It showcases models of the many mystical creatures featured in the film. It is also houses a village settlement, a traditional charcoal burner's hut, and an area where visitors can work iron forge bellows.

=== Valley of Witches ===
Valley of Witches takes inspiration from the film Kiki's Delivery Service and the wastelands in Howl's Moving Castle. This area includes restaurants and two small children's rides, consisting of a Zamperla Magic Bikes ride themed to Castle in the Sky and a carousel featuring elements of the three films in addition to Princess Mononoke, keeping to the theme of the park having no big rides or attractions. The area also has a replica of Kiki and her parents' home, as well as the bakery Gütiokipänjä. A life-sized replica of Howl's Moving Castle, four to five stories high, is the centerpiece of the area. The valley opened on March 16, 2024.

== See also ==
- Ghibli Museum
