= Android 207 =

- Directed by: Paul Whittington
- Written by: Paul Whittington
- Produced by: Paul Whittington
- Release dates: June 4, 2006 (United States); September 28, 2006 (Canada)
- Running time: 10 minutes
- Country: Canada
- Language: English

Android 207 is a 2006 short stop motion-animated film. It was directed, produced, written and edited by Canadian filmmaker Paul Whittington.

== Premise ==
A robot with human-like features finds himself in a vast labyrinth full of traps. As it tries to escape, it must face emotional and psychological challenges.

== Release and awards ==
The film was first released in the United States at the Milwaukee Short Film Festival on 4 June 2006. On 28 September 2006 it was released in Canada at the Vancouver International Film Festival. In 2007, the film received the Best Film, Best Technical and People's Choice awards at the Vancouver Island Short Film Festival. It went on to be shown at international film festivals in Beloit, Arizona and Milwaukee.
