= Nandarō =

Mascot of Nippon Television

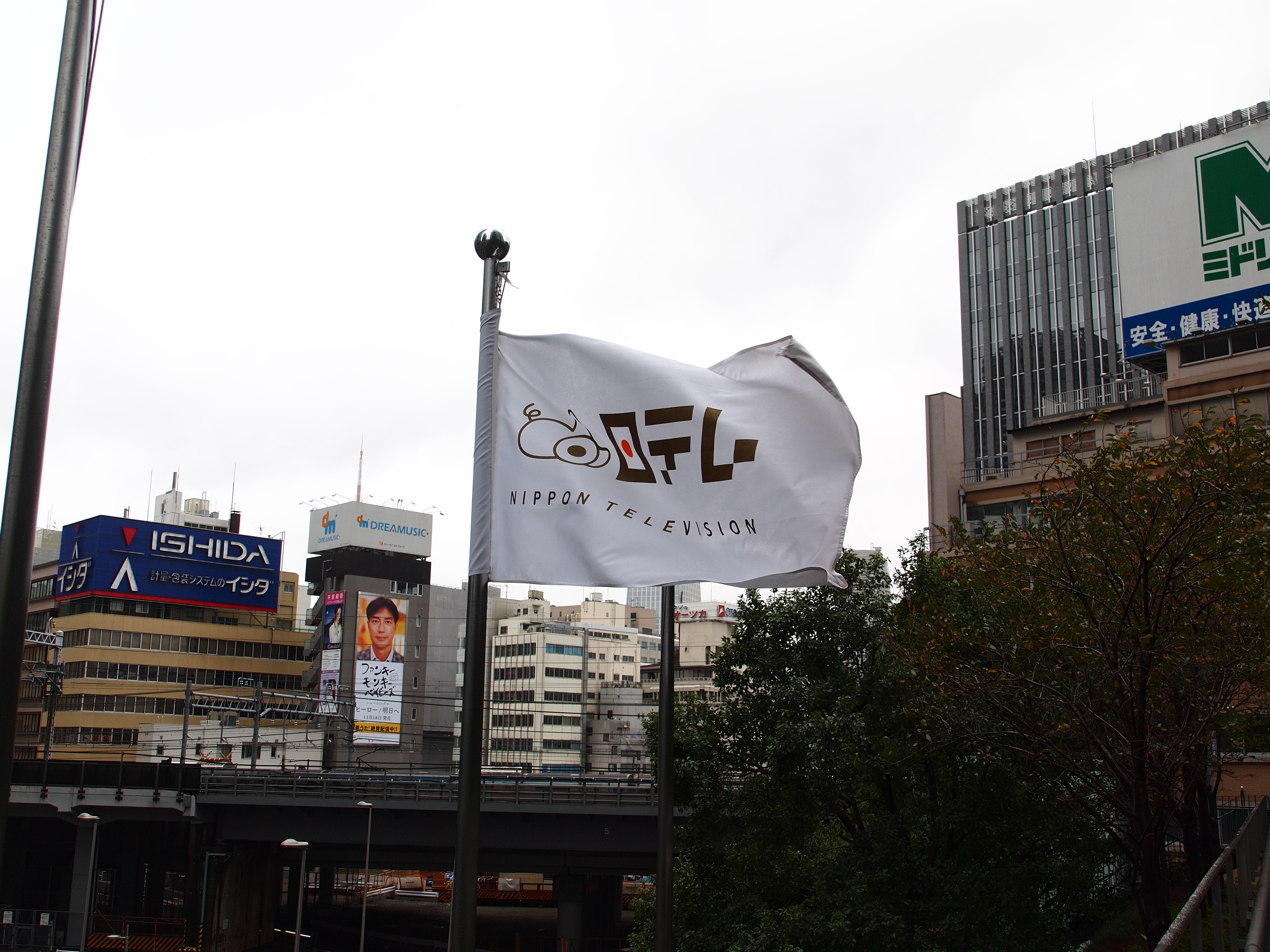
Flag of Nippon TV photographed in 2009, with Nandarō to the left of the NTV logo

Nandarō (なんだろう; lit. 'What Is It?') was the mascot of Nippon Television.

The motif is a green pig whose tail resembles the number 4 (alluding to the channel number, and the subsequent digital channel number).

== History ==
It was used from August 1992 to 2012. It was produced to commemorate the then-upcoming 40th anniversary of Nippon Television in 1993.

The character was designed by Hayao Miyazaki, the director of Studio Ghibli, and appears in the beginning of Porco Rosso. According to Miyazaki, this character is "a genderless fictitious creature, if you will, a symbol of curiosity and dreams that exist in everyone's heart".

It was planned to be used for one year as a character for the 40th anniversary slogan, "I am among everyone" (みんなの中に、私はいます。, Min'na no naka ni, watashi wa imasu). Instead of the Nippon Television company emblem and unified symbol mark.

In 1993, stuffed Nandarōs appeared on the set on the seats of program hosts on Nippon Television at the time, such as Gogo wa Omoikkiri TV, Quiz World is SHOWby Showby!!, and Magical Brain Power!!. In 1992, the official character "Otama Jackson" from the annual NNS telethon 24-Hour Television: Love Songs Save the Earth appeared in each program, but it became known to viewers and became popular as a stuffed animal took over. In 1994, it became the official mascot, and it has been used in production program credits. From 2003 to 2013, it was used as the company flag along with the logo change. It was emblazoned on relay cars and TV cameras.

From 2004 to 2013, it was also used by Nippon Television affiliate RF Radio Japan. As a company logo, the color scheme changed from 2003 (black edge + green → gold edge only, satellite channel BS Nippon Television until the end of March 2008 used "black edge + green" and still remained unchanged).

From January 1, 2008, to March 29, 2009, due to the use of the campaign logo (Nittele 55) associated with the company's 55th anniversary, Nandarō was temporarily dropped. After the end of the campaign on March 30, 2009, the end credits displayed Nandarō again).

From January 1, 2013, due to the replacement with the campaign logo ("Nittele Go! Next 60") accompanying the 60th anniversary, it no longer appeared in the end credits, including some programs on CS broadcasting and BS Nippon Television. The channel named Nittele G+, Nittele NEWS24, and Nittele Plus continued to use the conventional logos they had been using since 2003.

Since April 2014, Nandarō stopped appearing on TV screens, and Da Bear is the mascot character of NTV (he was introduced in 2009). However, Nandarō will continue to be used in the future. In the lower right corner of the promotional poster for Studio Ghibli's When Marnie Was There (directed by Hiromasa Yonebayashi) released on July 19, 2014, "なんだろう?" is written in small letters with only a black edge, instead of the new NTV logo. In addition, the logo displayed at the beginning of movies related to Nippon Television was partially changed due to the use of the current logo.

== Commercials ==
In the first year of the mascot's usage, Hayao Miyazaki created a series of commercials to promote the mascot. The spots first aired during November 1992, and featured one 15-second spot and four smaller 5-second spots. They were released on the Ghibli ga Ippai LaserDisc box set and the Ghibli ga Ippai Special Short Short DVD sets.
