= A Sumo Wrestler's Tail =

2010 short film from Studio Ghibli

- Title screen for the short film
- Japanese: ちゅうずもう
- Directed by: Akihiko Yamashita
- Written by: Hayao Miyazaki
- Starring: Sawako Agawa
- Music by: Manto Watanobe
- Production company: Studio Ghibli
- Distributed by: Ghibli Museum
- Release date: January 3, 2010
- Running time: 13 minutes
- Country: Japan
- Language: Japanese

A Sumo Wrestler's Tail (Japanese: ちゅうずもう, Hepburn: Chūzumō) is a 2010 fantasy animated 13-minute short film written by Hayao Miyazaki and directed by Akihiko Yamashita. It is based on a Japanese folk tale, Nezumi no Sumō. It was produced by Studio Ghibli for the Ghibli Museum in Mitaka.

== Plot ==
An old farmer discovers a group of rats heading to a sumo wrestling bout. After they lose miserably, he decides to feed the rats to boost their chances of winning.

== Production and release ==
Chūzumō was written and planned by Hayao Miyazaki, with storyboards by the director of the film, Akihiko Yamashita. The storyboards took three months to complete. The story is based on a Japanese folk tale, Nezumi no Sumō. The film depicts scenery and locations based on actual places in Nagano Prefecture.

It premiered at the Ghibli Museum on January 3, 2010. This was Yamashita's directorial debut, and—at the time of its release—it was the first film by Studio Ghibli to premier at the Ghibli Museum in four years. As part of the promotions for the film, wrestlers from the Arashio stable, including Ōyutaka Masachika, were invited to the museum where they held a sumō tournament in front of a group of children.

== Staff and cast ==
- Director: Akihiko Yamashita
- Planning: Hayao Miyazaki
- Screenplay: Hayao Miyazaki
- Storyboards: Akihiko Yamashita
- Music: Manto Watanobe
- Narrator: Sawako Agawa
- Production: Studio Ghibli
