= Never-Ending Man: Hayao Miyazaki =

- Directed by: Kaku Arakawa
- Starring: Hayao Miyazaki; Toshio Suzuki; Yuhei Sakuragi; Yukinori Nakamura
- Narrated by: Chika Sakamoto
- Country of origin: Japan
- Original language: Japanese

Production
- Cinematography: Kaku Arakawa
- Editor: Tetsuo Matsumoto
- Running time: 70 minutes
- Production company: NHK

Original release
- Network: NHK
- Release: November 13, 2016

Never-Ending Man: Hayao Miyazaki (Note: Japanese: 終わらない人 宮﨑駿, Hepburn: Owaranai Hito Miyazaki Hayao) is a 2016 Japanese documentary film directed by Kaku Arakawa. The film follows the Japanese animator and filmmaker Hayao Miyazaki in the wake of his decision to retire, including documenting the early production of his 2018 short film Boro the Caterpillar.

== Reception ==
The documentary received widespread attention when Kawakami Nobuo, former president of Kadokawa Corporation, showed a brief demonstration of a procedural animation, generated by artificial intelligence (AI), of a humanoid model moving with its head. Nobuo proposed that such a system could be applied in zombie videogames. He also expressed a desire to create an AI model which could generate images. In response, Miyazaki strongly criticised the proposal for its insensitivity towards disabled people, describing it as "an insult to life itself". In the 2020s, when AI-generated content became more widely accessible, this clip sparked discussion about the "spirit" and ethics of using AI in media. The clip once again went viral during March 2025 when images generated in the style of Ghibli films were created using GPT-4o's text-to-image tool.
