= Rio Yamase =

Japanese violinist, arranger, and composer

Rio Yamase 山瀬 理桜
- Occupation(s): Violinist, arranger, composer
- Instrument(s): Violin, Hardanger fiddle

Rio Yamase (山瀬 理桜, Yamase Rio) is a Japanese violinist, arranger, and composer.

She directed the music for the 2006 Studio Ghibli animation short film Mizugumo Monmon.

== Albums ==
- Golden Aurora (2004)
- Crystal Rose Garden (2005)
- Mizugumo Monmon Original Soundtrack (2006)
