= Yamase Building =

- U.S. National Register of Historic Places
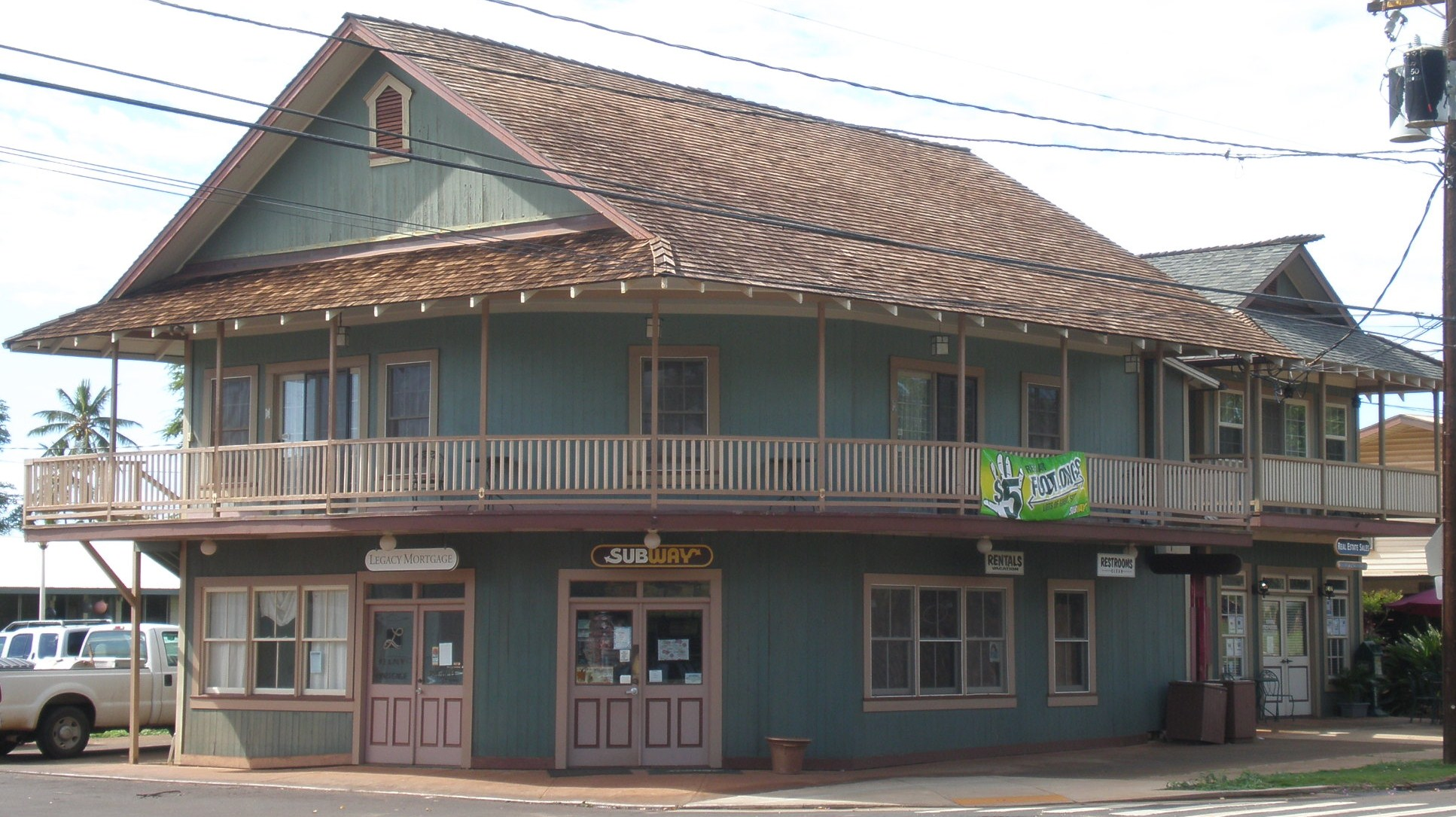
- Yamase Building

- Location within Hawaii
- Location: 4493 Moana Rd., Waimea, Kauaʻi
- Coordinates: 21°57′20″N 159°40′08″W
- Area: < 1 acre
- Built: c. 1919
- Architect: Murakama
- NRHP reference No.: 96000398
- Added to NRHP: 12 April 1996

The Yamase Building at the corner of Moana Road and Kaumualiʻi Highway in Waimea, Kauaʻi, was built around 1919 by an itinerant Japanese temple architect for Seiichi Yamase, a nisei son of Japanese immigrants. Despite being the only structure of its kind in Hawaiʻi, it well represents both commercial architecture in rural Hawaii and the contribution of immigrants to the growth of commerce there. It was listed on the National Register of Historic Places in 1996.

Corner buildings with curved facades are rare, but not unknown in Hawaii. However, most of them are masonry, not wood frame constructions, and no other such curved corner sits beneath a cantilevered, rectangular, Japanese-style (irimoya) hip and gable roof. The cantilevered, wrap-around balcony on the upper floor follows the curve of the walls beneath, serving the same function as the verandah walkways around traditional Japanese homes. The upper-story doors are also paned sliding doors, like Japanese shōji. Upper-story balconies were typical of many small family-owned shops, where the family lived above the shop.

The ground floor has two sets of double doors, each providing access to a separate commercial space. The building first housed a branch of Sumitomo Bank, but has also housed at times a shoe store, barber shop, liquor store, and other small businesses. Its current tenants are West Kauai Collective retail store and a sandwich shop.

The building has sustained some flood damage over the years, and very severe wind damage during Hurricane Iwa in 1983 and Iniki in 1992, but has since been restored to good condition.
