= Kūsō no Sora Tobu Kikaitachi =

Imaginary Flying Machines
- Directed by: Hayao Miyazaki
- Written by: Hayao Miyazaki
- Produced by: Toshio Suzuki
- Starring: Hayao Miyazaki
- Music by: Joe Hisaishi
- Production company: Studio Ghibli
- Distributed by: Ghibli Museum
- Release date: 2002 (Ghibli Museum)
- Running time: 6 minutes
- Country: Japan
- Language: Japanese

Kūsō no Sora Tobu Kikaitachi (空想の空飛ぶ機械達; lit. 'Imaginary Flying Machines') is a 2002 Japanese animated short film produced by Studio Ghibli for their near-exclusive use in the Ghibli Museum. It features director Hayao Miyazaki as the narrator, in the form of a humanoid pig, reminiscent of Porco from Porco Rosso, telling the story of flight and the many machines imagined to achieve it.

The film could also be seen on the in-flight entertainment system used by Japan Airlines.
