= Hoshi o Katta Hi =

2006 Japanese animated short film

The Day I Raised a Planet
- Directed by: Hayao Miyazaki
- Screenplay by: Hayao Miyazaki
- Story by: Naohisa Inoue
- Produced by: Toshio Suzuki
- Starring: Ryunosuke Kamiki Yo Oizumi Kyōka Suzuki Genzō Wakayama
- Cinematography: Atsushi Okui
- Edited by: Takeshi Seyama
- Music by: Yuriko Nakamura Norihiro Tsuru
- Production company: Studio Ghibli
- Distributed by: Ghibli Museum
- Release date: January 3, 2006
- Running time: 16 minutes
- Country: Japan
- Language: Japanese

Hoshi o Katta Hi (星をかった日; lit. 'The Day I Bought a Star') is a Japanese animated short film written and directed by Hayao Miyazaki and released January 3, 2006. It was produced by Toshio Suzuki for Studio Ghibli for their exclusive use in the Saturn Theatre at the Ghibli Museum in Mitaka, Tokyo. The film is based on a story by Naohisa Inoue.

== Plot ==
A boy named Nono, living on the countryside, is making a living by selling vegetables in the city nearby. One day two strangers approach him to offer him a gem which looks like a flower seed for his produce. He accepts the trade and at home he plants the seed inside a small pot. Soon a tiny planet emerges, so he continues to tend after the planet and a few days later three moons are circling around the tiny planet. Once again Nono has to leave the countryside to sell his produce and again meets the two strangers who have a final request for him.
