= Mizugumo Monmon =

2006 Japanese animated short film

- Directed by: Hayao Miyazaki
- Written by: Hayao Miyazaki
- Produced by: Toshio Suzuki
- Starring: Akiko Yano
- Cinematography: Atsushi Okui
- Music by: Rio Yamase
- Production company: Studio Ghibli
- Distributed by: Ghibli Museum
- Release date: January 3, 2006
- Running time: 15 minutes
- Country: Japan
- Language: Japanese

Mizugumo Monmon (水グモもんもん; lit. Water Spider Monmon) is a fifteen-minute Japanese animated short film released on January 3, 2006. It was written and directed by Hayao Miyazaki for animation studio Studio Ghibli. It can be seen at the Ghibli Museum in Mitaka, Tokyo, Japan.

== Synopsis ==
It is based in part on Boro, the Caterpillar, a story idea which Hayao Miyazaki considered working on prior to the start of production on Princess Mononoke. The short film's main character is a diving bell spider who has fallen in love with a water strider. Although she is scared of him at first, the water strider soon gets used to the presence of the spider.

== Technical specifications ==
The short film has an aspect ratio of 1.85:1.

== See also ==
- Mizugumo
