= Crawlspace (2004 film) =

- Directed by: Peter Sved
- Written by: Peter Sved
- Produced by: Adam Dolman
- Edited by: David Cole
- Music by: Tamara O'Brien
- Distributed by: AFTRS
- Release date: April 2004
- Running time: 8 minutes
- Country: Australia
- Language: English

Crawlspace is a 2004 animated short film, written, directed and animated by Peter Sved as his graduation piece at The Australian Film, Television and Radio School in Sydney.

== Plot ==
A strange man stuck in a desert wakes from his coma and goes in search of water. He discovers a lush green forest, alive with plants and animals the likes of which he could never have dreamt of. He finds a watersnake (a bizarre creature that is a snake with a human hand as its head; is made of a semi-transparent fluid; has the ability to float in air) that has been captured by a giant plant that resembles a venus flytrap, and rescues the strange creature from its clutches. In return, the creature reveals to him the secret place in the forest where water can be found.

== Festival screenings and awards ==
=== Festivals ===
- Hiroshima International Animation Festival 2004, Japan (Winner – Stars of Students Award)
- ComGraph 2004: Asia-Pacific Digital Art & Animation Competition, Singapore (Winner – Merit Award, Student Computer Animation Section)
- Australian Effects and Animation Festival 2004, Sydney (Nomination, Best Graduation Film)
- Asiana International Short Film Festival 2004, Seoul, Korea
- Asia Pacific Film Festival 2004, Kuala Lumpur, Malaysia
- St Kilda Film Festival 2004, Melbourne
- Mill Valley Film Festival 2004, California, USA
- Trebon International Animation Festival 2005, Czech Republic
- Ecozine International Film Festival 2009, Spain

=== Nominations ===
- 2005 MPSE Nomination for Best Sound in Student film for Derryn Pasquil's sound design
- 2005 MPSE Golden Reel Nomination, LA, for Tamara O'Brien's original score
