= Ghibli Museum =

Art museum in Mitaka, Tokyo, Japan

Coordinates: 35°41′46.44″N 139°34′13.55″E

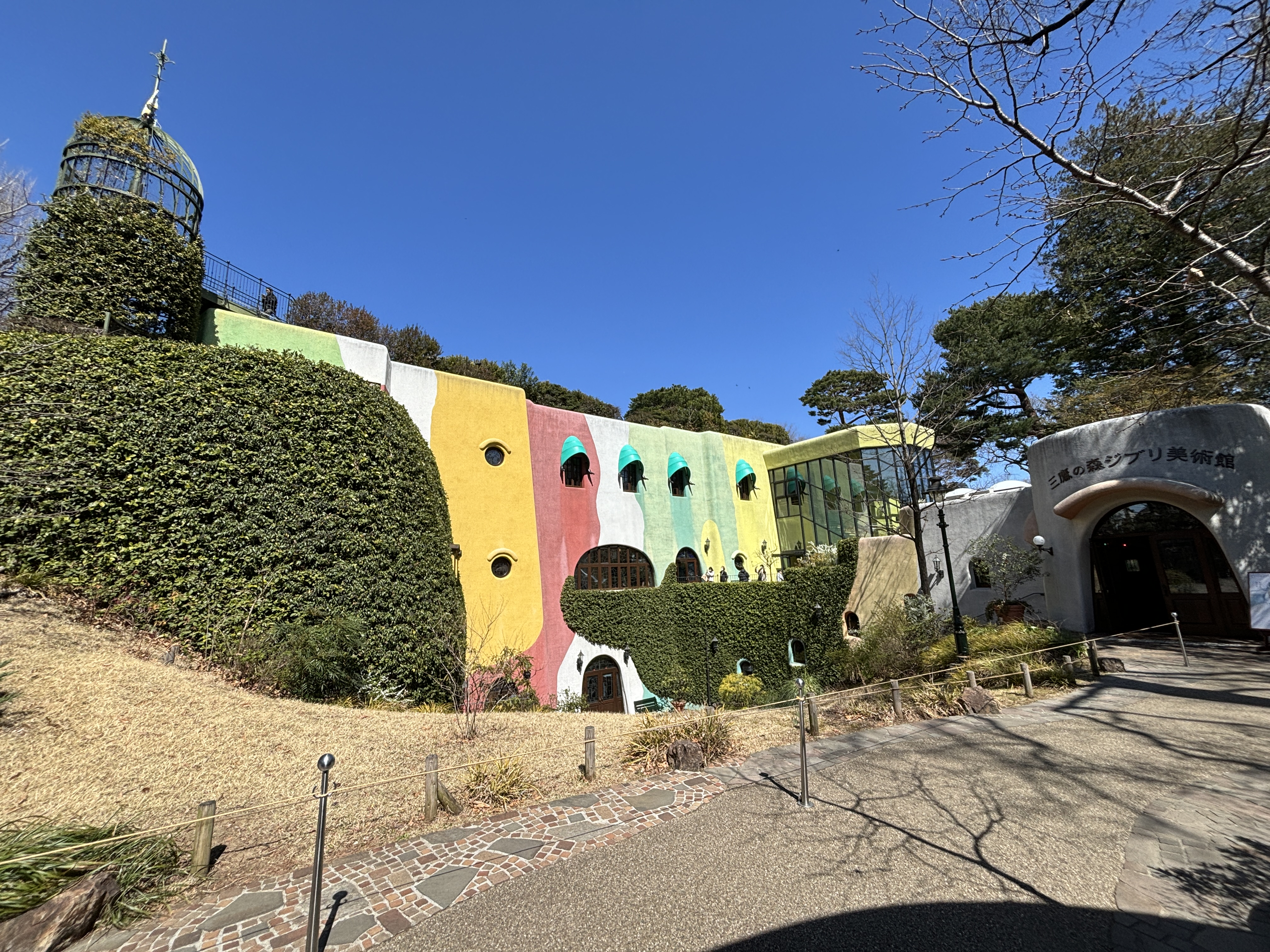
- Exterior of the Ghibli Museum
- Established: 1 October 2001; 25 years ago
- Location: 1-1-83 Shimorenjaku, Mitaka; Tokyo 181-0013
- Website: Official website

The Ghibli Museum (三鷹の森ジブリ美術館, Mitaka no Mori Jiburi Bijutsukan; Mitaka Forest Ghibli Museum) is a museum showcasing the work of the Japanese animation studio Studio Ghibli. It is located in Inokashira Park in Mitaka, a western city within the Tokyo Metropolitan Area, in Japan. The museum combines features of a children's museum, technology museum, and a fine arts museum and is dedicated to the art and technique of animation. Features include a replica of the Catbus from My Neighbor Totoro (1988), a café, bookstore, rooftop garden, and a theater for exclusive short films by Studio Ghibli.

== Background ==
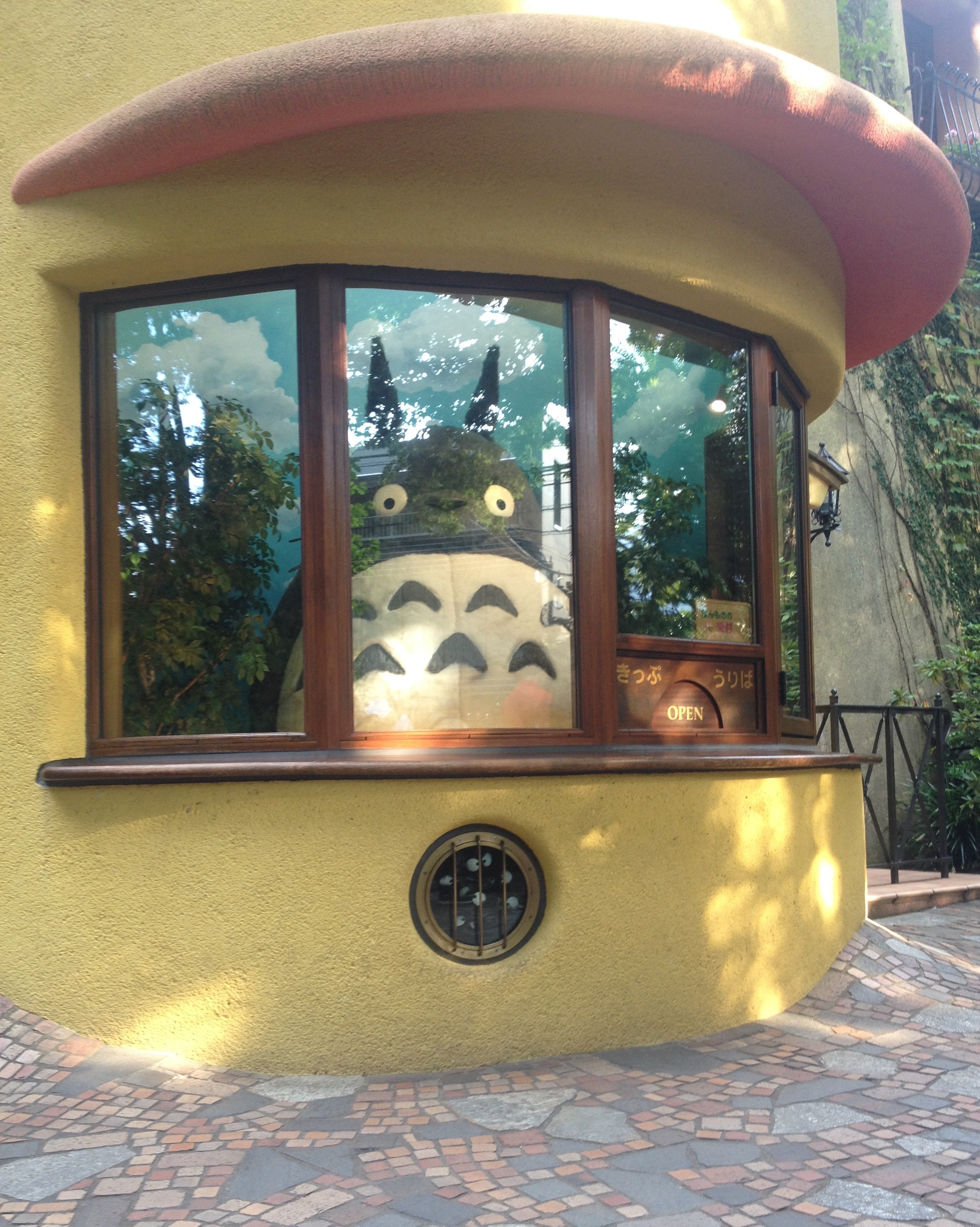
Totoro gazes out from the box office, reminding museum visitors to buy a ticket in advance.

Planning for the museum began in 1998, and construction started in March 2000. The museum opened on 1 October 2001. Studio Ghibli director Hayao Miyazaki designed the museum himself, using storyboards similar to the ones he creates for his films. The design was influenced by European architecture such as the hilltop village of Calcata in Italy. The museum features internal and external spiral staircases built from iron, interior bridges, and balconies stretching throughout the building's height. The stairways lead to exhibits, dead ends, and across bridges. These characteristics are meant to reflect Miyazaki's building designs displayed in his film work. Miyazaki's aim was to make the building itself part of the exhibit and for the museum to be an uplifting and relaxing experience "that makes you feel more enriched when you leave than when you entered".

Photography and video recording is prohibited inside, because the museum is described as a "portal to a storybook world".

"Let's get lost together" is the museum's slogan, derived from Miyazaki's vision for visitors to immerse themselves in his imagination and film work.

In February 2020, the museum closed temporarily as a result of the COVID-19 pandemic. It re-opened to Mitaka residents only in July and fully in September.

== Exhibits ==
=== Permanent exhibitions ===
On the bottom floor of the museum is an exhibit room showing the history and science of animation, including a three-dimensional zoetrope named "Bouncing Totoro", with models of characters from My Neighbor Totoro (1988). On the first floor is a mock-up of an animation studio. Called "Where a Film is Born", the five-room exhibit is meant to showcase the creative process of an animation filmmaker, including illustration techniques. Packed with books and toys, the room also displays drawings and illustrations that cover the walls. Another exhibit demonstrates the process of creating an animated film, with sketches, storyboarding, keyframing, cleanup, coloring, and background painting.

=== Special exhibitions ===
In addition to Ghibli-oriented exhibitions, the museum hosts an area showcasing work from other studios.

Date	Exhibit
2001–2002	Spirited Away
2002–2004	Castle in the Sky and Imaginary Flying Machines
2003–2004	Works by the Russian animator Yuri Norstein
2004–2005	Pixar Animation Studios
2005–2006	Heidi, Girl of the Alps
2006–2007	Aardman Animations, primarily focused on their work on Wallace and Gromit
2007–2008	Goldilocks and The Three Bears (3びきのくま, Sanbiki no kuma), based on a picture book version by Leo Tolstoy. Panda! Go, Panda!, one of Miyazaki and Isao Takahata's early, pre-Ghibli films from 1972.
2008–2009	Petit Louvre
2009–2010	Ponyo on the Cliff by the Sea
2010–2011	Ghibli Forest Movies — Welcome to Saturn Theater
2011–2012	The View from the Cat Bus
2012–2013	The Gift of Illustrations ― A Source of Popular Culture
2013–2014	The Lens at Work in the Ghibli Forest
2014–2015	The Nutcracker and the Mouse King ― A Fairy Tale Treasure
2015–2016	The Haunted Tower ― Perfect Popular Culture

=== Short films ===
The Ghibli Museum shows several short films. Located in the basement is the Saturn Theater, which has windows where automated shades lower and open before and after each showing. This is because Miyazaki designed the theater with small children in mind, who could possibly be scared of the closed-in space. The museum shows one of the following Ghibli short films in the Saturn Theatre:

- Koro's Big Walk (コロの大さんぽ, Koro no dai-sampo)
- Water Spider Monmon (水グモもんもん, Mizugumo Monmon)
- Mei and the Kittenbus (めいとこねこバス, Mei to Konekobasu)
- The Day I Harvested a Star (星をかった日, Hoshi o Katta Hi)
- The Whale Hunt (くじらとり, Kujiratori)
- Looking for a home (やどさがし, Yadosagashi)
- A Sumo Wrestler's Tail (ちゅうずもう, Chūzumō)
- Mr. Dough and the Egg Princess (パン種とタマゴ姫, Pan dane to tamago hime)
- Treasure Hunting (たからさがし, Takara Sagashi)
- Boro the Caterpillar (毛虫のボロ, Kemushi no Boro)

The films are also screened at the Cinema Orion in the Grand Warehouse section of Ghibli Park, in Nagakute.

== Other features ==
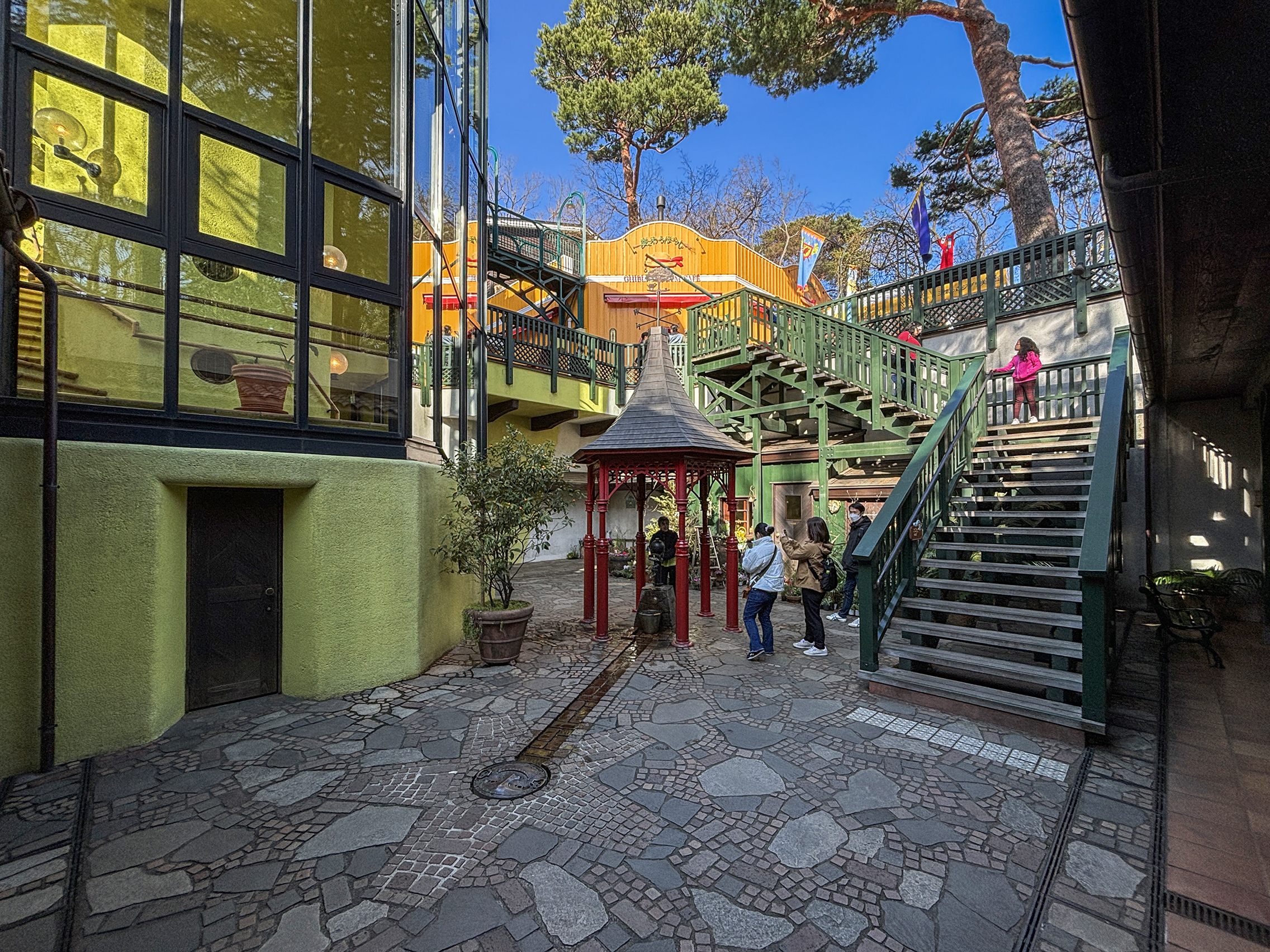
Courtyard in the museum

=== Tri Hawks ===
Tri Hawks is a reading room and bookstore in the Ghibli Museum. Opened on 6 February 2002, it is filled with books recommended by Hayao Miyazaki. The name Tri Hawks comes from a translation of "Mitaka", the city where the museum is located, which means "three hawks".

=== Mamma Aiuto ===
Mamma Aiuto, on the top of the Ghibli Museum, is a souvenir shop named after the band of sky pirates in the movie Porco Rosso. The film is set in Italy, and the name Mamma Aiuto translates to "mama, help me" in Italian. Among other items, it sells classic and non-Japanese animated movies under the Ghibli Museum Library label.

=== Straw Hat Café ===
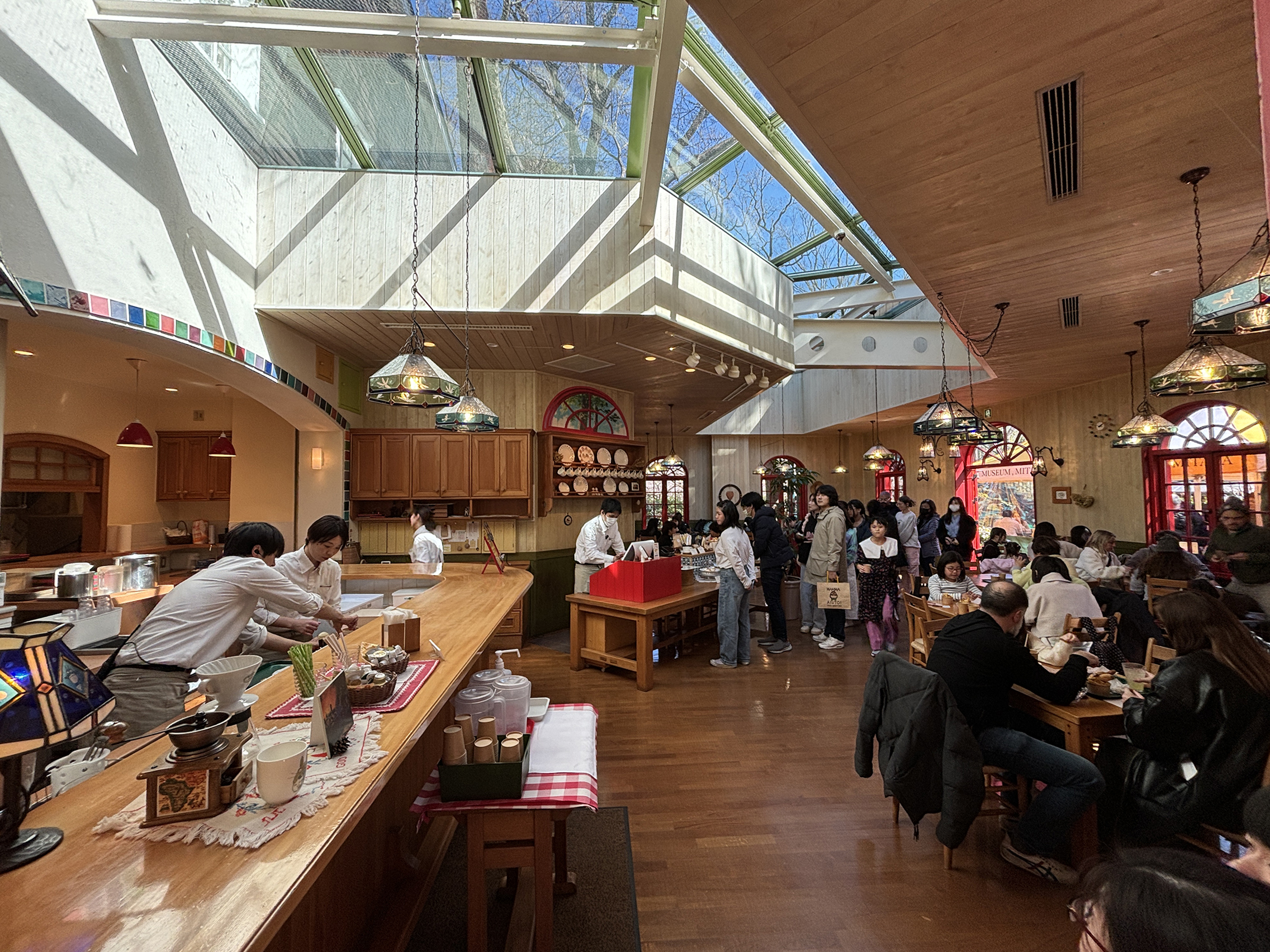
Straw Hat Café

The Straw Hat Café is the Ghibli Museum's only sit-down restaurant. It was created with the help of a housewife and mother of four; Miyazaki wanted the café's food to be "a kind of home cooking". It serves hot and cold food, snacks, and desserts. Sold at the takeout section is an original alcoholic beverage, "Valley of the Wind" beer, which was created in a collaboration with Dairy Kingdom Oratche, a microbrewery in Tanna Basin. The beverage's label was hand-drawn by Gorō Miyazaki, Miyazaki's son, who is an animation director at Studio Ghibli.

=== Catbus room ===
There is a playroom for children aged 12 and under, with a stuffed Catbus toy to play in. Its size is slightly reduced from the original scale in My Neighbor Totoro, for it to fit into the museum.

=== Rooftop garden ===
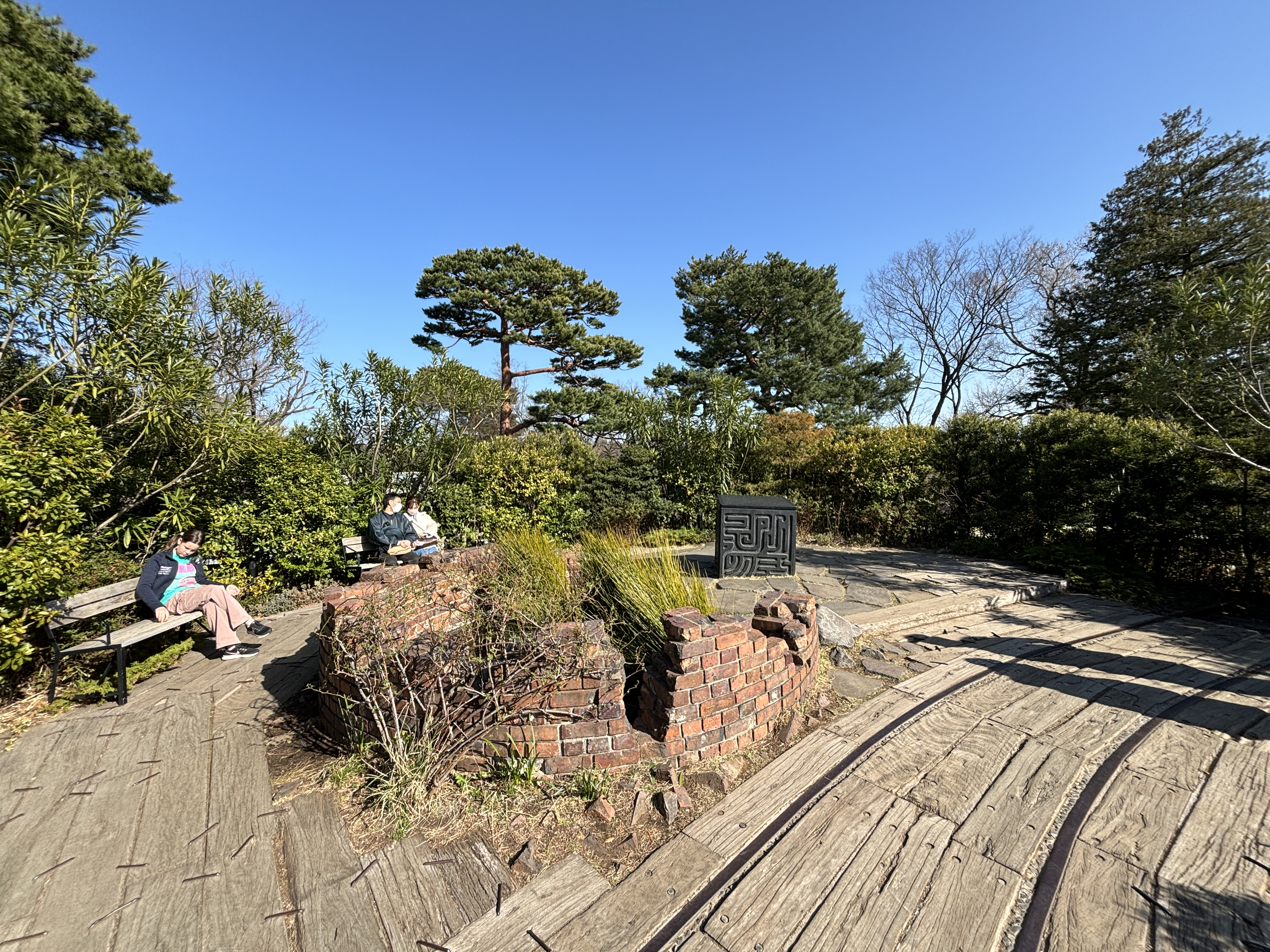
Rooftop garden

On the museum's roof is a garden with a life-size, five-meter-tall statue of a robot from the final episode of Lupin III Part II and from the film Castle in the Sky. The Robot Soldier was made by the artist Kunio Shachimaru. It is formed from a hammered copper plate and took two years to complete. The keystone from Castle in the Sky, bearing an inscription in Old Persian cuneiform, which can also be found in the rooftop garden, is a replica of the control room stone found in the floating castle, Laputa, in the movie.

=== Fresco painting ===
At the entrance of the building, the museum's ceiling is covered in a fresco painting that features characters from Studio Ghibli films, such as Kiki on her broomstick from Kiki's Delivery Service (1989).

=== Stained glass ===
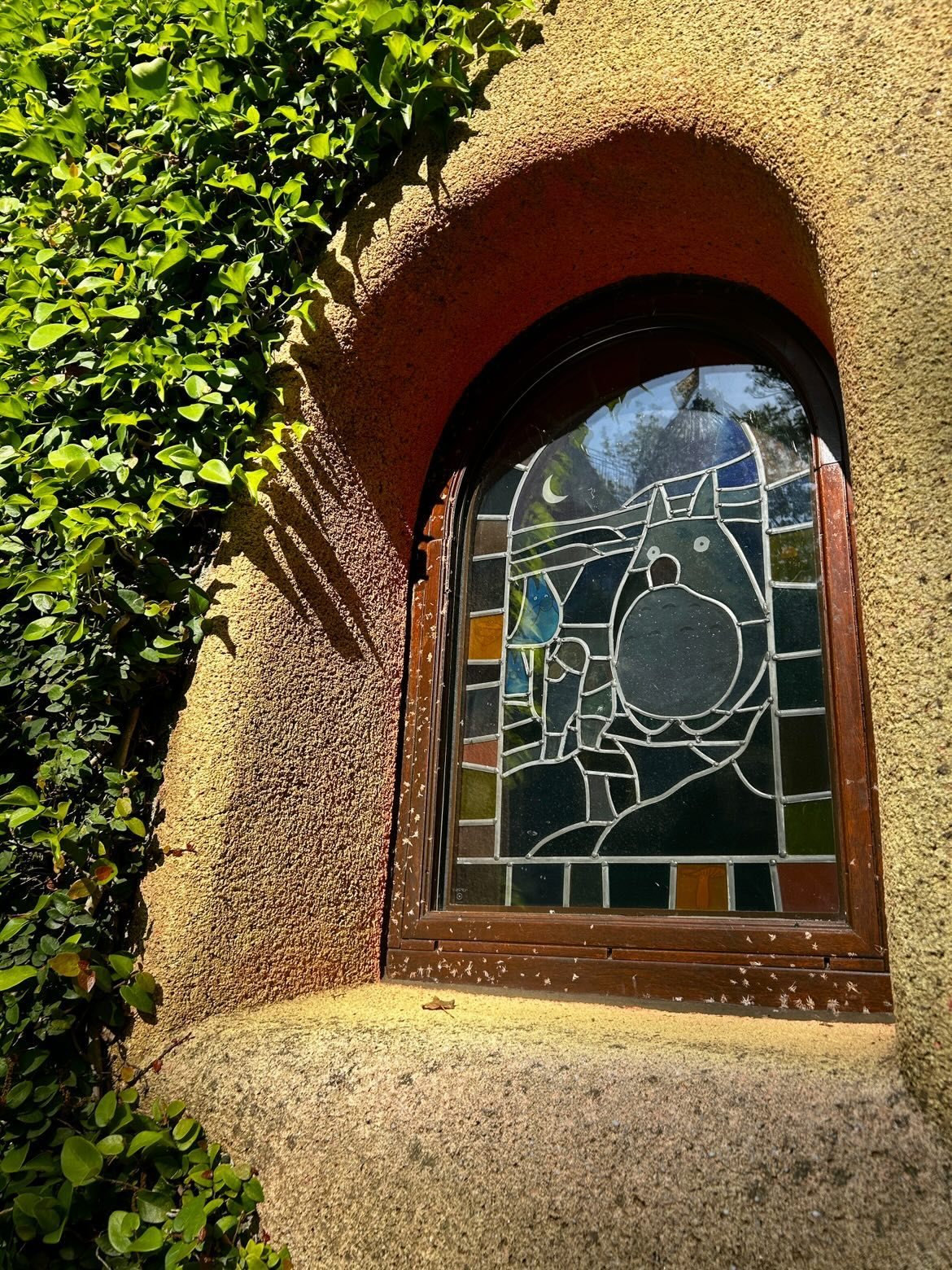
Totoro stained glass

Throughout the museum, there are several works of stained glass featuring various characters from Studio Ghibli films, such as Totoro and the lesser-known blue Chu Totoros.

== Tickets ==
Tickets to the Ghibli Museum must be purchased in advance. They range in price from ¥1,000 for adults to ¥700 for 13–18-year-olds, ¥400 for 7–12-year-olds, and ¥100 for 4–6-year-olds. Younger children can enter the museum for free.

== See also ==
- Ghibli Park
- Meiji-mura
- Toei Kyoto Studio Park
- Warner Bros. Studio Tour Tokyo – The Making of Harry Potter
