= Handpulled Noodle =

Chinese restaurant in New York City

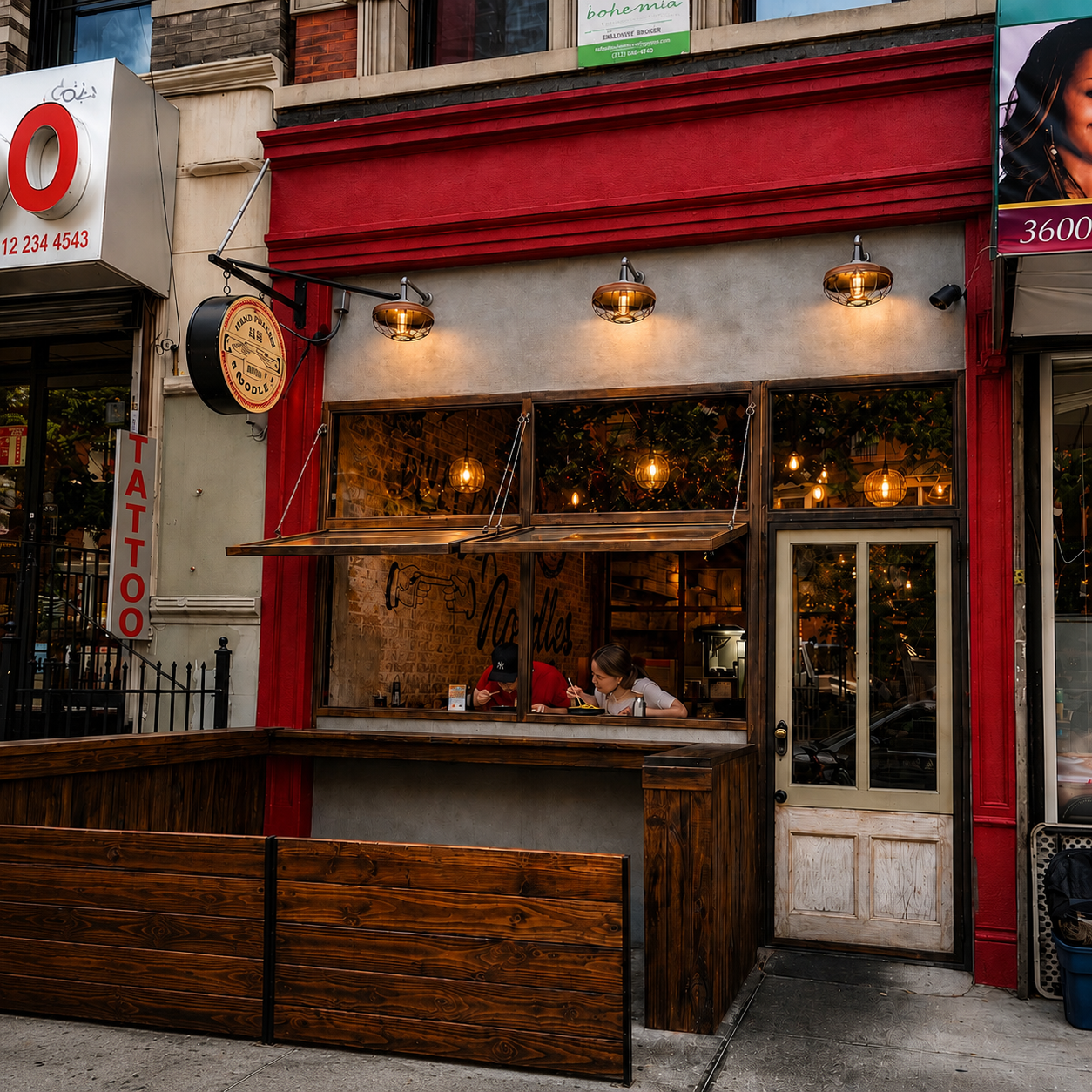
- The original location in Hamilton Heights (West Harlem), Manhattan
- Interactive map of Handpulled Noodle

Restaurant information
- Established: February 2015; 11 years ago
- Food type: Northwestern Chinese
- Location: 3600 Broadway, New York, New York, United States
- Coordinates: 40.8284°N 73.9487°W
- Other locations: Harlem, Hell's Kitchen
- Website: thehandpullednoodle.com

The Handpulled Noodle is a Chinese restaurant in New York City specializing in Northwestern Chinese cuisine, including hand-pulled noodles and dumplings. It was founded in 2015 by Andrew Ding in the Hamilton Heights neighborhood of Manhattan and has since expanded to additional locations in Harlem and Hell's Kitchen.

== History ==
The Handpulled Noodle opened in February 2015 on Broadway near 148th Street in Hamilton Heights. Its founder, Andrew Ding, was born in Xinjiang, China, and raised in Sydney, Australia; a trained classical violist with no professional culinary background, he based the menu on his mother's cooking. The restaurant later opened a second location in Central Harlem in 2020 and a third in Hell's Kitchen in 2024.

== Cuisine ==
The restaurant serves Northwestern Chinese dishes such as dumplings and several styles of hand-pulled noodle, including the chopped "ding ding" noodles associated with Xinjiang, along with ribbon and laghman noodles. Diners assemble their own meal by choosing a noodle style, a protein or vegetable, and a preparation such as soup or stir-fry.

== Reception ==
The restaurant received a positive "Hungry City" review in The New York Times by critic Ligaya Mishan. It was also covered by The Wall Street Journal, The Village Voice, and CBS New York, and has been featured by Eater.
