= Miyazaki Airplane =

Japanese aircraft-parts manufacturer

- Type: Private
- Industry: Aircraft Parts Manufacturing
- Headquarters: Kanuma, Japan
- Key people: Katsuji Miyazaki (Director)

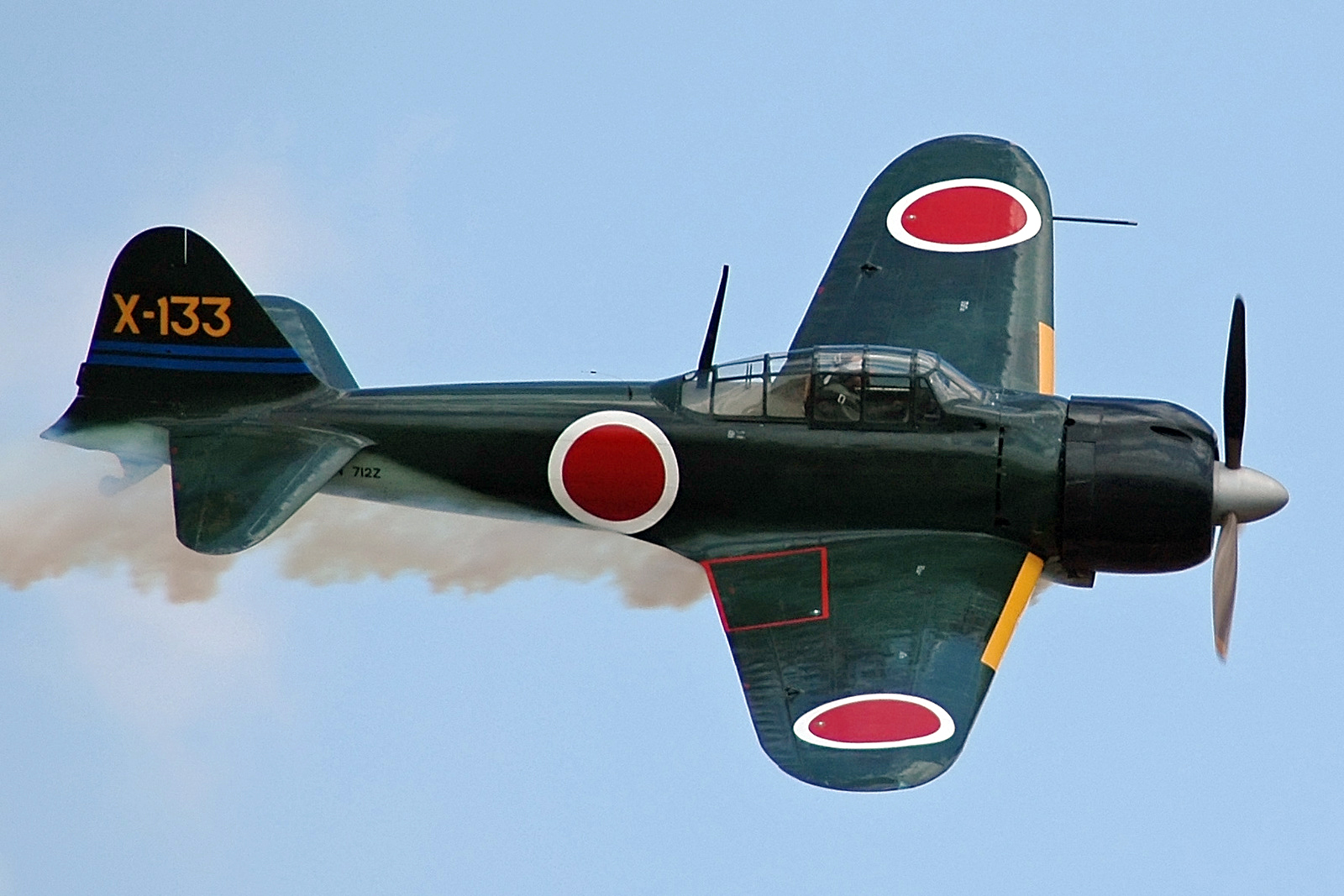
An example of a Mitsubishi A6M3 Zero Model 22 for which Miyazaki Airplane manufactured parts

Miyazaki Airplane (宮崎航空機製作所, Miyazaki Kōkūki Seisakusho) was an aircraft parts manufacturing company based in Japan's Tochigi Prefecture during World War II. The company owned a factory located in Kanuma, that manufactured parts, including rudders, for the Mitsubishi A6M Zero. During the war, the firm relocated to Utsunomiya.

== Ownership and leadership ==
The company was run by Katsuji Miyazaki (c. 1915 – March 18, 1993), the father of the Studio Ghibli animation studio co-founder Hayao Miyazaki. During World War II production runs the company was owned by Katsuji's brother.
