= Noriko T. Reider =

Japanese author

Noriko T. Reider is the author of several books that focus on Japanese literature, folklore, and art. She currently works as a professor of Japanese at Miami University. She has written multiple books on the history of Japanese demons and yokai, with special focus on the history and nature of oni.

== Books ==
- Tales of the Supernatural in Early Modern Japan: Kaidan, Akinari, Ugetsu Monogatari (2002)
- Japanese Demon Lore: Oni from Ancient Times to the Present (2010)
- Seven Demon Stories from Medieval Japan (2016)
- Mountain Witches: Yamauba (2021)

== Scholarly articles ==
- The Appeal of "Kaidan", Tales of the Strange (2000)
- The Emergence of "Kaidan-shū" The Collection of Tales of the Strange and Mysterious in the Edo Period (2001)
- Transformation of the Oni: From the Frightening and Diabolical to the Cute and Sexy (2003)
- Shuten Dōji: "Drunken Demon" (2005)
- "Spirited Away": Film of the Fantastic and Evolving Japanese Folk Symbols (2005)
- Onmyōji Sex, Pathos, and Grotesquery in Yumemakura Bakus Oni (2007)
- Animating Objects Tsukumogami ki and the Medieval Illustration of Shingon Truth (2009)
- "Hanayo no hime," or "Blossom Princess" A Late-Medieval Japanese Stepdaughter Story and Provincial Customs (2011)
- "Menoto no sōshi" (A Tale of Two Nursemaids): Teaching for the Women of High Society in the Medieval Period (2012)
- Tsuchigumo soshi: The Emergence of a Shape-Shifting Killer Female Spider (2013)
- Haseo sōshi: A Medieval Scholar’s Muse (2015)
- A Demon in the Sky: The Tale of Amewakahiko, a Japanese Medieval Story (2015)
- Yamauba and Oni-Women: Devouring and Helping Yamauba are Two Sides of the Same Coin (2019)
- Demon Slayer Kimetsu no yaiba: Oni, Vampires, and Sexuality (2024)
