= Ligaya Mishan =

American restaurant critic and writer

Ligaya Mishan is a restaurant critic and food columnist. She is one of the two chief restaurant critics for The New York Times, and has been a food columnist for The New Yorker.

== Early life and education ==
Mishan grew up in Hawaii, the child of a Filipino mother and English father. She has a BA in English Literature from Princeton University and a Master of Fine Arts in Creative Writing and Poetry from Cornell University.

== Career ==
Mishan is the author of the book Filipinx: Heritage Recipes from the Diaspora, and has been a food columnist for The New Yorker. She wrote the Hungry City column for the New York Times from 2012 to 2020, and has written numerous columns in both the food section of the newspaper as well as in its weekly magazine.

In 2019, Mishan was appointed as the Mary Higgins Clark chair on Creative Writing at Fordham University.

In June 2025, The New York Times appointed Mishan as one of its two new chief restaurant critics, marking a shift toward nationally focused restaurant coverage and ending the tradition of critic anonymity.
