= Hayao Miyazaki bibliography =

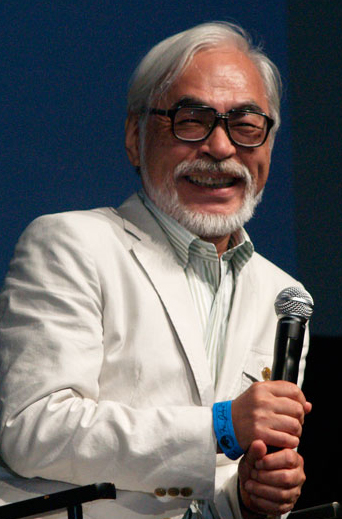
Miyazaki in 2009

Several books have been written about Hayao Miyazaki, a Japanese animator, filmmaker, manga artist, and co-founder of Studio Ghibli. The books explore Miyazaki's biography and career, particularly his feature films. According to Jeff Lenburg, more papers have been written about Miyazaki than any other Japanese artist. The first English-language book devoted to Miyazaki was Helen McCarthy's Hayao Miyazaki: Master of Japanese Animation in 1999, focusing on the films' narrative and artistic qualities. Many authors focus on Miyazaki's career and films, like Dani Cavallaro and Raz Greenberg, while others examine the themes and religious elements of his works, such as Eriko Ogihara-Schuck and Eric Reinders. Colin Odell and Michelle Le Blanc's 2009 book explores the careers of both Miyazaki and Isao Takahata, and Susan J. Napier's 2018 book Miyazakiworld highlights the ideological connections between Miyazaki's films and personal life. A picture book by Miyazaki was published in 1983, later loosely adapted into his 1997 film Princess Mononoke, and two books compiling essays, articles, lectures, and outlines written by Miyazaki were published in 1996 and 2008.

== Books by Hayao Miyazaki ==
=== Princess Mononoke (1983) ===
Princess Mononoke (Japanese: もののけ姫, Hepburn: Mononoke-hime) is a 1983 picture book written and illustrated by Hayao Miyazaki. The 29.5 cm × 29.5 cm coffee-table book contains 104 pages of watercolor images and narration. It follows a princess arranged to marry an animalistic spirit (mononoke) who returns to save her demon-possessed father. After completing his first feature film, The Castle of Cagliostro (1979), Miyazaki began working on sketches for a new animation in 1980. The story was roughly based on the fairy tale "Beauty and the Beast" (1740), with its setting changed to historical Japan. Miyazaki drew and painted the boards in approximately a month. Unlike other projects, for which he traveled to take inspiration from his surroundings, he created these paintings from his imagination.

After unsuccessfully proposing the film project to several production companies, Miyazaki published his concepts in this book. According to Tribute's Nadira Chand, Miyazaki also felt the plot misrepresented the period of Japanese history it was set in. However, Miyazaki went on to reuse various ideas from this project in his later films such as My Neighbor Totoro (1988) and Porco Rosso (1992). In 1993, Studio Ghibli republished the book in anticipation of its film adaptation Princess Mononoke (1997), then in early production. The book has little in common with the eventual film, with an entirely different plot and character designs, but it shares a few ideas, such as a character gaining strength due to an evil curse and a weapons factory inside a fortress. It is also set in a more recent period of Japanese history than the film.

The book was translated to English and republished by Viz Media on October 21, 2014, as Princess Mononoke: The First Story. Writing for IndieWire, Charles Solomon called it "enchanting" and wrote that fans of Miyazaki's work would find it worth perusing. ScreenAnarchy's Ard Vijn felt the work was "gorgeous", although he felt it was significantly less detailed than the style of Miyazaki's films. Chand wrote that the book allowed for the analysis of Miyazaki's illustrating talent without it being "tainted by animated effects." She also appreciated the contrast provided by the selective painting of foreground characters compared to other elements.

=== Starting Point: 1979–1996 (1996) ===
Starting Point: 1979–1996 (Japanese: 出発点, Hepburn: Shuppatsu Ten) is a compilation of essays, articles, lectures, and outlines written by—and interviews with—Miyazaki between 1979 and 1996. First published in hardcover in Japan in 1996, the book features about 90 chapters chronicling Miyazaki's thoughts on animation, the film industry, and his own works, as well as a full-color reprinting of Miyazaki's eight-page manga Kuuchuu de Oshokuji and an afterword written by Isao Takahata. One of Miyazaki's essays became notable for being the sole criticism of manga artist and animator Osamu Tezuka after his death; Miyazaki felt Tezuka's work was "silly", despite his earlier works inspiring a young Miyazaki.

Viz Media published a 461-page English translation of the book in hardcover on August 4, 2009, following a delay from July 7. Viz Media editor Nick Mamatas felt the North American release of Miyazaki's film Ponyo in 2009 would increase interest in Miyazaki's career. The book was translated by Frederik L. Schodt and Beth Cary, who visited the Ghibli Museum to better understand Miyazaki. Schodt and Cary sent Mamatas "anywhere between 20 and 100 pages at a time" for editing; he felt the variety of content led to difficulties in maintaining accurate tones while translating and editing. The English translation includes an eleven-page foreword by John Lasseter and its main content is split into five subjects, including people, animation, and film. It was released in a 462-page paperback on April 8, 2014, and a 464-page ebook on March 16, 2021.

Los Angeles Times's Charles Solomon described the book as "essential reading for anyone interested in Japanese—or Western—animation". Anime News Network's Theron Martin called it "a must-read for any Miyazaki admirer", praising its insight of Miyazaki's philosophies surrounding life and animation; he found Miyazaki's planning notes the most interesting element. Writing for Animation World Network, Peter Tieryas lauded Miyazaki's refreshing, reflective, and honest candor and his comedic tales of his earlier life. Sight and Sound's Andrew Osmond praised the translated text as "flowing and graceful", though noted possible confusion for English readers due to the unavailability of some of Miyazaki's earlier works outside of Japan, such as Future Boy Conan (1978). Screen Anarchy's Ard Vijn praised Miyazaki's writing and humor and the inclusion of his drawings and manga, but lamented the omission of information about Miyazaki's friendly rivalry with animator Mamoru Oshii.

=== Turning Point: 1997–2008 (2008) ===
Turning Point: 1997–2008 (折り返し点, Orikaeshi Ten) is a compilation of essays, talks, and illustrations by—and interviews with—Miyazaki between 1997 and 2008. First published by Iwanami Shoten in hardcover in Japan in 2008, the book is largely focused on two of Miyazaki's films from this period: Princess Mononoke (1997) and Spirited Away (2001); his other two, Howl's Moving Castle and Ponyo (2008) are infrequently mentioned. Several of Miyazaki's essays about life are relevant to the films, such as anthropology and medieval history to Princess Mononoke, and the development of children to Spirited Away. Some essays explore Miyazaki's thoughts on writers such as Antoine de Saint-Exupéry and Robert Westall, filmmakers like Francis Ford Coppola and Steven Spielberg, and films like Dark Blue World (2001).

Viz Media published a 452-page English translation of the book in hardcover on April 8, 2014, coinciding with the home media release of Miyazaki's 2013 film The Wind Rises. The book was translated by Schodt and Cary. It was released in a 462-page paperback on March 16, 2021, and a 456-page ebook on March 16, 2021. Sight and Sound's Andrew Osmond found the book "illuminating" but "exasperatingly disorganised" and its chapters repetitious. Anime News Network's Rebecca Silverman similarly considered the book repetitious and some of Miyazaki's opinions "uncomfortable ... for western readers" but praised the insight into his works, particularly the revelations about Princess Mononoke.

== Books about Hayao Miyazaki ==
=== Hayao Miyazaki: Master of Japanese Animation (1999) ===
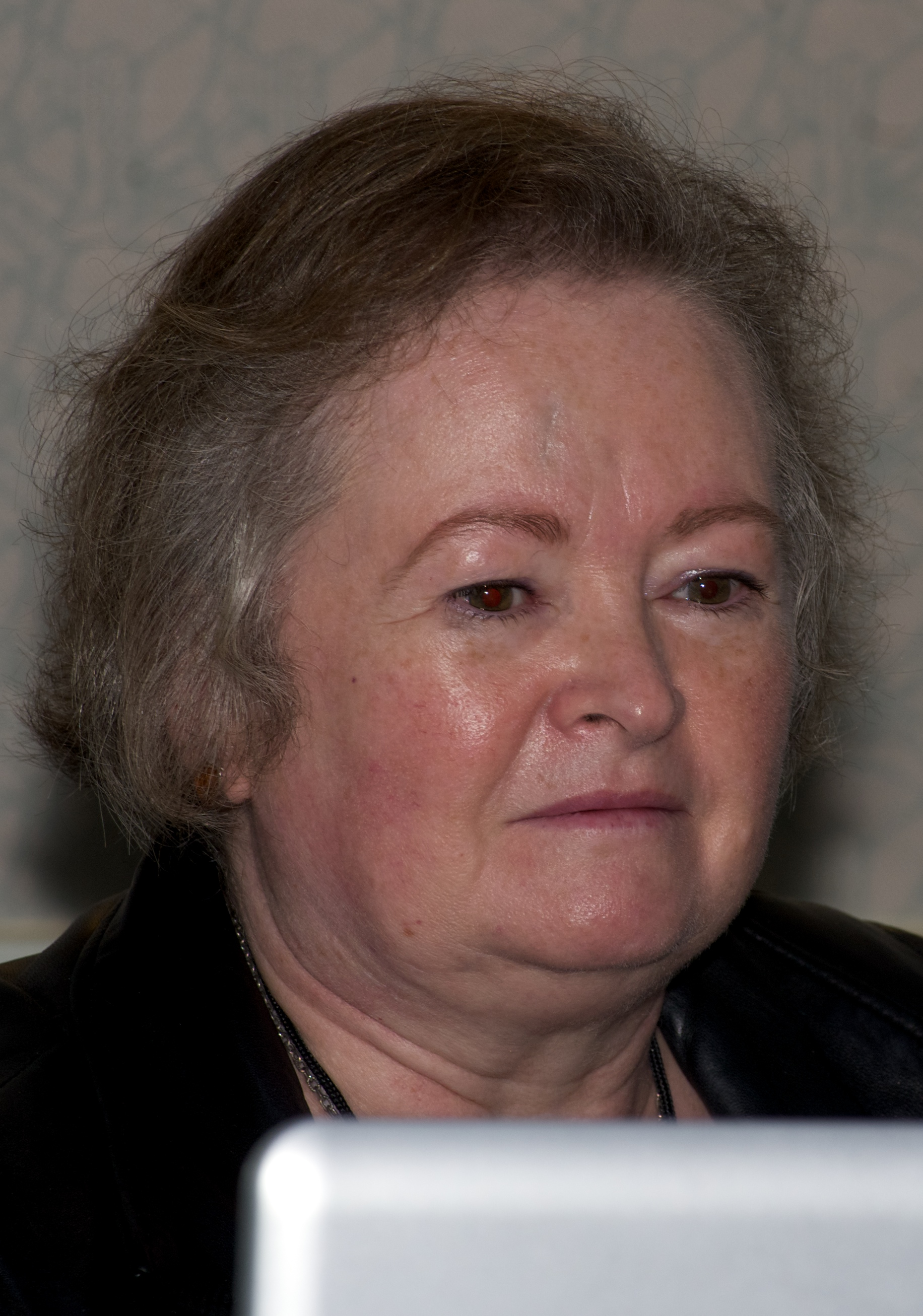
Helen McCarthy in 2011

Hayao Miyazaki: Master of Japanese Animation is a 1999 biography written by British author Helen McCarthy. The first English-language book devoted to Miyazaki, the 240-page paperback was published by Stone Bridge Press in September 1999, alongside the North American release of Princess Mononoke the following month. The book features eight pages of color illustrations and 60 black-and-white images, as well as character sketches and story synopses. It explores Miyazaki's childhood and early career, and the Japanese myths that inspired his works, focusing on the films' narrative and artistic qualities. A special edition version was published in the United Kingdom by Optimum Releasing alongside Princess Mononoke's DVD release, but later withdrawn due to licensing issues.

After watching My Neighbor Totoro in 1989, McCarthy began pitching a book about the director to British publishers but felt they were uninterested in a biography about "a single Asian cartoon director only geeks had heard of". Around 1997, animator Jeffrey J. Varab encouraged McCarthy to approach American publishers; she pitched the book to Peter Goodman of Stone Bridge, who accepted. In researching the book, McCarthy visited Studio Ghibli's offices and interviewed several employees, including Miyazaki and producer Toshio Suzuki, over two days in January 1999. The book sold 10,000 copies within two months—a record for Stone Bridge—prompting a reprint in December.

The book was called "a very handsome tribute to Miyazaki and his work" by The Japan Times's Donald Richie, and "a real find" by San Francisco Chronicle's Peter Stack, who praised McCarthy's love of Miyazaki's work as "infectious" and her prose as "insightful and at times lovely". SF Site's Lisa DuMond lauded McCarthy's research and writing style, declaring her an authority on Miyazaki and his works. Midnight Eye's Tom Mes described McCarthy's writing style as "neither too highbrow nor too populist" and felt the book would "remain the seminal publication in the study of the animator's work". In 2021, McCarthy said she was more likely to write a sequel book about Miyazaki's later career than update the original.

=== The Animé Art of Hayao Miyazaki (2006) ===
The Animé Art of Hayao Miyazaki is a 2006 book by British writer Dani Cavallaro. The book explores Miyazaki's career from his early manga work up to Howl's Moving Castle. The book, intended as "an introduction for audiences ... marginally familiar with Miyazaki's oeuvre", explores his work in the context of other animation and manga works, analyses his films and their blend of traditional and cel-shaded animation, and discusses their collaborative elements and his relationship with Disney. Cavallaro discusses the appeal of Miyazaki's films to Western audiences, and highlights the work of other Studio Ghibli directors, such as Grave of the Fireflies (1988) and The Cat Returns (2002).

The 204-page paperback book was published by McFarland & Co. in 2006, alongside the home media release of Howl's Moving Castle in the United States. Choice's R. D. Sears lauded Cavallaro's research as "thorough and painstaking" for its development of context, history, and nuances, though found her writing occasionally "ponderous" and the illustrations "inadequate". California Bookwatch described it as "an excellent scholarly analysis" of Miyazaki's work, and Anime.com's Brian Cirulnick called it "an excellent book and a worthy addition to any anime fan's library". Cavallaro wrote two more books about Miyazaki, published by McFarland: The Late Works of Hayao Miyazaki: A Critical Study, 2004–2013 (2014), discussing his directorial and writing work on feature and short films; and Hayao Miyazaki's World Picture (2015), examining five themes in Miyazaki's works.

=== Studio Ghibli: The Films of Hayao Miyazaki and Isao Takahata (2009) ===
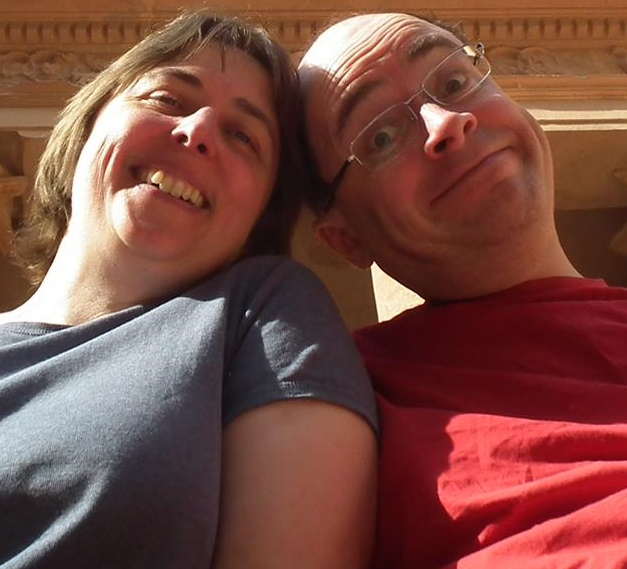
Michelle Le Blanc and Colin Odell in 2016

Studio Ghibli: The Films of Hayao Miyazaki and Isao Takahata is a 2009 book by Colin Odell and Michelle Le Blanc. The authors—a married writing duo—spent several months researching for the book and traveled to Japan, where they visited the Ghibli Museum and watched Ponyo before its Western release. The book's original draft was "twice as long as it should have been". Odell and Le Blanc aimed the book at a wider audience as opposed to purely academics. The 160-page paperback was published on March 26, 2009, by Kamera Books, with eight pages of colour images. Library Journal's Terry Hong called the book "an excellent overview" of Studio Ghibli, and Film Ireland's Michiko Yamada wrote it was "a must-have handbook for the Ghibli lover".

=== Miyazaki's Animism Abroad: The Reception of Japanese Religious Themes by American and German Audiences (2014) ===
Miyazaki's Animism Abroad: The Reception of Japanese Religious Themes by American and German Audiences is a 2014 book by Eriko Ogihara-Schuck. The 240-page book was published by McFarland & Co. in paperback and ebook formats. It is split into four sections analysing the themes in Miyazaki's works and examines the reception of his films in Germany and North America. Ogihara-Schuck considers the regional perceptions of Nausicaä of the Valley of the Wind, My Neighbor Totoro, Princess Mononoke, and Spirited Away, and the manner in which they were adapted to local audiences. The book evolved from Ogihara-Schuck's PhD dissertation and some chapters were previously published in other books in 2010 and 2011.

In the Japanese Journal of Religious Studies, Francisco J. López Rodríguez lauded Ogihara-Schuck's study of contemporary animism in understanding Miyazaki's work and religious dissemination in media, but found some of her claims unconvincing. ImageTexT's Michael Hale praised Ogihara-Schuck's writing and scholarship for being engaging and accessible while remaining primarily academic, noting that "fans of Miyazaki from all circles should give the work a chance". Conversely, All the Anime's Andrew Osmond found most chapters "more myopic than enlightening", though found one particularly fascinating for readers interested in intercultural adaptation.

=== Hayao Miyazaki: Looking Beyond the Fog (2013) ===
Hayao Miyazaki: Looking Beyond the Fog (Italian: Hayao Miyazaki. Sguardi oltre la nebbia) is a 2013 book by Maria Teresa Trisciuzzi, then a PhD student at the University of Bologna. The 160-page book, published by Carocci Editore in May 2013, analyzes the childhood metaphors in Miyazaki's films, particularly My Neighbor Totoro and Panda! Go, Panda!, and their pedagogical potential. Writing in Ricerche di Pedagogia e Didattica, Angela Articoni called the book competent and entertaining, praising Trisciuzzi's extensive research and bibliography. The book was awarded the National Prize for Children's Literature and for Children presented by the University of L'Aquila.

=== Miyazaki's Worlds: Philosophical Paths in the Universes of the Japanese Artist (2016) ===
Miyazaki's Worlds: Philosophical Paths in the Universes of the Japanese Artist (Italian: I mondi di Miyazaki. Percorsi filosofici negli universi dell'artista giapponese) is a 2016 book edited by Matteo Boscarol, published by Mimesis Edizioni. The original edition, released in February 2016, collates the works of eight authors, each focusing on different elements of Miyazaki's career. An updated 184-page edition was released in paperback and as an ebook in 2023, following the release of Miyazaki's film The Boy and the Heron. AnimeClick.it praised the book but noted many readers criticized the chapter by Luigi Abiusi regarding uchronia elements in Miyazaki's works.

=== The Moral Narratives of Hayao Miyazaki (2016) ===
The Moral Narratives of Hayao Miyazaki is a 2016 book by Eric Reinders. Published by McFarland & Co., the 222-page book analyses themes, morals, and religious elements in Miyazaki's films. Raz Greenberg called it "an interesting but flawed book", enjoying its deeper analysis of religion and mythology but criticizing Reinders's ignorance of the film's production context. ImageTexT's Kevin Cooley applauded the book's unique concept but found its execution flawed and felt Reinders's comparisons of Miyazaki and J. R. R. Tolkien were unclear.

=== Hayao Miyazaki: Exploring the Early Work of Japan's Greatest Animator (2018) ===
Hayao Miyazaki: Exploring the Early Work of Japan's Greatest Animator is a 2018 book by Israeli writer Raz Greenberg. Its six chapters explore Miyazaki's early career from 1963 to 1985, including the artists and locations that inspired him. The book observes that Miyazaki's works evolved from optimism in the 1980s to darker narratives in the 1990s and 2000s. Greenberg was inspired to write the book as he felt Miyazaki's earlier works were largely unexplored. His work on the book was delayed by other projects, such as his PhD thesis. The 169-page book was published in 2018 by Bloomsbury Publishing as part of its Animation: Key Films/Filmmakers series, alongside three other books about Princess Mononoke, Toy Story (1995), and animator Norman McLaren. Screen's Malcolm Cook lauded Bloomberg's series for its contribution to animation studies.

Choice's John A. Lent praised Greenberg's analysis of Miyazaki's works and descriptions of his inspirations, though felt the book's detailed synopses limited its analyses. Animation's Marco Bellano praised the book's exploration of Miyazaki's largely undiscussed early work, providing context for his later films. He found Greenberg's personality made the book "accessible and pleasant to read" and felt it would be an appropriate tool in animation history studies. Writing for the International Institute for Asian Studies, Mari Nakamura called the book "a must-read" for those interested in Miyazaki, anime, and animation studies, but felt additional acknowledgement of primary and scholarly sources would have better contextualized Miyazaki's work. Strange Horizons's Ashley S. Moser applauded Greenberg's research but felt his writing was often unsupported, unexplained, and uncertain. All the Anime's Andrew Osmond disagreed with several of Greenberg's points, such as his descriptions of characters and proclamation of Miyazaki's "influences" without sourcing the claims, and lamented the lack of analysis of Takahata's works.

=== Miyazakiworld: A Life in Art (2018) ===
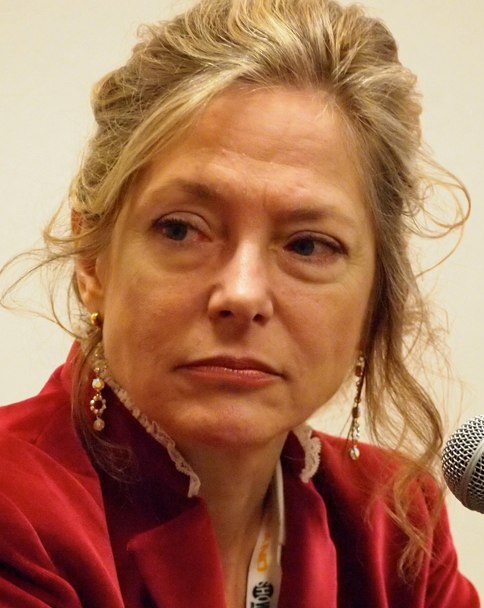
Susan J. Napier in 2012

Miyazakiworld: A Life in Art is a 2018 book by American writer Susan J. Napier. Its sixteen chapters explore Miyazaki's life and films: the first three chronologically discuss his early life and introduction to animation, and the following thirteen examine the impact of his life experiences on his work. Napier discusses themes like environmentalism, nostalgia, and women empowerment, and frequently references Miyazaki's relationship with his mother, especially in relation to My Neighbor Totoro and The Wind Rises. The book is one of few to analyse his manga Nausicaä of the Valley of the Wind.

Napier introduces the title, Miyazakiworld, as "the immersive animated realm that varies delightfully from film to film but is always marked by the director's unique imagination". The 344-page hardcover and digital book was published by Yale University Press on September 4, 2018, and the paperback on November 19, 2019. Reviewers praised Napier's writing style and detailed research but some felt there were aspects the book could have expanded upon.

=== Other books ===
- The Origin of Miyazaki Hayao: The Story of Mother and Son (Japanese: 宮崎駿の原点: 母と子の物語, Hepburn: Miyazaki Hayao no genten: Haha to ko no monogatari) is a 2002 biography by Japanese writer and pop culture specialist Mitsunari Ōizumi. One of the earliest biographies about Miyazaki, the book focuses on his childhood and career with little information about his personal life.
- The Complete Hayao Miyazaki (Japanese: 宮崎駿全書, Hepburn: Miyazaki Hayao Zensho) is a 2006 reference work by the Japanese film scholar Seiji Kanō. The book draws from interviews with Studio Ghibli staff members and covers 18 of Miyazaki's feature-length and short films, including aspects of their productions, inspirations, and animation techniques.
- Hayao Miyazaki: The Unsuspected Contradictions of a Storyteller (Italian: Hayao Miyazaki. Le insospettabili contraddizioni di un cantastorie) is a 2009 book by Alessia Spagnoli, published by Sovera Edizioni. It features reviews and analyses of Miyazaki's films, as well as his television works like Future Boy Conan and Sherlock Hound.
- The Cinema of Hayao Miyazaki is a 2011 book by Jeremy Mark Robinson, published by Crescent Moon Publishing. In addition to discussing Miyazaki's work, the book explores his themes and influences, unmade films, and characters, as well as chapters on Takahata's work and other Japanese animation. A 664-page revised edition was published in paperback and hardcover with illustrations.
- Hayao Miyazaki: Japan's Premier Anime Storyteller is a 2012 book by Jeff Lenburg. The 120-page hardcover book was published by Chelsea House in February 2012.
- The Invisible World of Hayao Miyazaki (Spanish: El mundo invisible de Hayao Miyazaki) is a 2012 book by Laura Montero Plata. She developed it over seven years from her doctoral thesis, and discusses Miyazaki and Studio Ghibli in the context of Japanese animation history. It contains over a thousand illustrations. The 256-page book was published by Dolmen Editorial in December 2012.
- War and Peace in Studio Ghibli Films is a 2014 book by Daisuke Akimono. Published by Lambert Academic Publishing, the book examines the evolution of political themes in Miyazaki's films. Raz Greenberg enjoyed Akimono's analysis but felt its structure read like a thesis manuscript.
- The Works of Hayao Miyazaki: The Japanese Animation Master (French: L'œuvre de Hayao Miyazaki: Le maitre de l'animation japonaise) is a 2018 book by French writer Gael Berton. Published by Third Éditions in 2018 in French and in 2020 in English, the book chronicles Miyazaki's career. All the Anime's Shelley Pallis felt the book lacked uniqueness among previous works, and identified several errors and omissions.

== Bibliography ==
- Akimono, Daisuke (2014). "War and Peace" in Studio Ghibli Films. Saarbrücken: Lambert Academic Publishing. ISBN 978-3-659-61832-1.
- Berton, Gael (August 10, 2018). L'œuvre de Hayao Miyazaki: Le maitre de l'animation japonaise (in French). Third Éditions. ISBN 978-2-377-84052-6.
  - ——— (September 2, 2020). The Works of Hayao Miyazaki: The Japanese Animation Master. Third Éditions. ISBN 978-2-377-84288-9.
- Boscarol, Matteo, ed. (February 2016). I mondi di Miyazaki. Percorsi filosofici negli universi dell'artista giapponese [Miyazaki's Worlds: Philosophical Paths in the Universes of the Japanese Artist] (in Italian) (2023 ed.). Sesto San Giovanni: Mimesis Edizioni. ISBN 979-1-222-30304-8.
- Cavallaro, Dani (2006). The Animé Art of Hayao Miyazaki. Jefferson: McFarland & Company. ISBN 978-0-786-42369-9. LCCN 2005035065.
- Greenberg, Raz (2018). Hayao Miyazaki: Exploring the Early Work of Japan's Greatest Animator. Animation:Key Films/Filmmakers. New York: Bloomsbury Publishing. doi:10.5040/9781501335976. ISBN 978-1-501-33596-9.
- Kanō, Seiji (2006). 宮崎駿全書 [The Complete Hayao Miyazaki] (in Japanese). Film Art. ISBN 978-4-8459-0687-1.
- Lenburg, Jeff (February 2012). Hayao Miyazaki: Japan's Premier Anime Storyteller. Legends of Animation. Chelsea House. ISBN 978-1-604-13841-2.
- McCarthy, Helen (September 1999). Hayao Miyazaki: Master of Japanese Animation. Stone Bridge Press. ISBN 1-880656-41-8. LCCN 99043688.
- Miyazaki, Hayao (1983). もののけ姫 [Princess Mononoke] (in Japanese).
  - ——— (October 21, 2014). Princess Mononoke: The First Story. Viz Media. ISBN 978-1-4215-7586-5.
- Miyazaki, Hayao (August 1996). Shuppatsu Ten 1979–1996 (in Japanese). Studio Ghibli. ISBN 978-4-198-60541-4.
  - ——— (August 4, 2009). Starting Point: 1979–1996. Viz Media. ISBN 978-1-421-50594-7.
- Miyazaki, Hayao (July 16, 2008). Orikaeshi Ten 1997–2008 (in Japanese). Iwanami Shoten. ISBN 978-4-000-22394-2.
  - ——— (April 8, 2014). Turning Point: 1997–2008. Viz Media. ISBN 978-1-421-56090-8.
- Montero Plata, Laura (2012). El mundo invisible de Hayao Miyazaki [The Invisible World of Hayao Miyazaki] (in Spanish). Dolmen Editorial. ISBN 978-84-15296-60-7.
- Napier, Susan J. (September 4, 2018). Miyazakiworld: A Life in Art. Yale University Press. ISBN 978-0-300-24096-2.
- Odell, Colin; Le Blanc, Michelle (March 26, 2009). Studio Ghibli: The Films of Hayao Miyazaki and Isao Takahata. Kamera Books. ISBN 978-1-842-43279-2.
- Ōizumi, Mitsunari (2002). Miyazaki Hayao no genten: Haha to ko no monogatari [The Origin of Miyazaki Hayao: The Story of Mother and Son] (in Japanese). Tokyo: Chode Hansha.
- Ogihara-Schuck, Eriko (2014). Miyazaki's Animism Abroad: The Reception of Japanese Religious Themes by American and German Audiences. Jefferson: McFarland & Company. ISBN 978-0-786-47262-8.
- Reinders, Eric (2016). The Moral Narratives of Hayao Miyazaki. Jefferson: McFarland & Company. ISBN 978-1-4766-6452-1.
- Robinson, Jeremy Mark (2011). The Cinema of Hayao Miyazaki. Crescent Moon Publishing. ISBN 978-1-861-71515-9.
- Spagnoli, Alessia (April 1, 2009). Hayao Miyazaki. Le insospettabili contraddizioni di un cantastorie [Hayao Miyazaki. The Unsuspected Contradictions of a Storyteller] (in Italian). Rome: Sovera Edizioni. ISBN 978-8-881-24800-1.
- Trisciuzzi, Maria Teresa (March 21, 2013). Hayao Miyazaki. Sguardi oltre la nebbia [Hayao Miyazaki: Views Beyond the Fog] (in Italian). Rome: Carocci Editore. ISBN 978-8-843-06916-3.
