= Miyazakiworld =

2018 reference work by Susan J. Napier

Miyazakiworld: A Life in Art
- Author: Susan J. Napier
- Genre: Reference
- Publisher: Yale University Press
- Publication date: September 4, 2018
- Pages: xviii, 305
- ISBN: 978-0-300-22685-0
- OCLC: 1050871101

Miyazakiworld: A Life in Art is a 2018 reference work by the American animation scholar Susan J. Napier. The book is a biography of the Japanese animator and director Hayao Miyazaki and analyzes several of his works. After encountering Miyazaki's films while writing a book on anime, Napier decided to create a work focused on him. She spent eight years researching and writing it and interviewed Miyazaki in the process. Miyazakiworld was published by Yale University Press and was reviewed in a number of journals and magazines. Most reviewers praised Napier's writing style and detailed research, but felt that there were some aspects the book could have expanded upon.

== Contents ==
Miyazakiworld is a chronological account of the life and career of Hayao Miyazaki, and is a blend between a biography and a critical analysis of his works. It contains sixteen chapters; the first three detail Miyazaki's childhood and early career until the production of The Castle of Cagliostro (1979), his first feature film. The subsequent thirteen analyze each of his films up to The Wind Rises (2013), with one more focusing on his manga Nausicaä of the Valley of the Wind (1982–1994). Susan J. Napier introduces the title, Miyazakiworld, as "the immersive animated realm that varies delightfully from film to film but is always marked by the director's unique imagination." She previously used the term to refer to the adherence to Miyazaki's political and philosophical viewpoints in Studio Ghibli fan discourse, which she studied within the Miyazaki Mailing List.

Napier argues Miyazaki is an auteur, despite general skepticism that an animator can hold such a label, and discusses recurring themes in his work such as environmentalism, nostalgia, and women's empowerment. She often connects moments in Miyazaki's personal and professional life to aspects of his fictional works. For example, Napier identifies a commonality in the settings of several films which she terms "Miyazaki's cherished Euroworld", a combination of fantastical elements and inspiration drawn from the director's travels to Europe. At several points, she references one of Miyazaki's childhood memories of the Pacific War – of leaving behind a woman and a child as his family escaped the firebombing of Tokyo – which Napier argues strongly impacted his depictions of children as resilient and independent. She frequently references Miyazaki's relationship with his mother – who was bedridden with tuberculosis for much of Miyazaki's childhood – particularly with regard to My Neighbor Totoro (1989) and The Wind Rises. The book tracks the development of Miyazaki's political philosophies, such as his pacifist stances growing up in the aftermath of the Pacific War, or the influence of his role in a labor union at Toei Animation on his leftist views. She argues that Miyazaki's privileged upbringing informed these anti-authoritarian stances. Napier also discusses several natural disasters in Japan that affected Miyazaki's portrayals of the natural world.

== Background and development ==
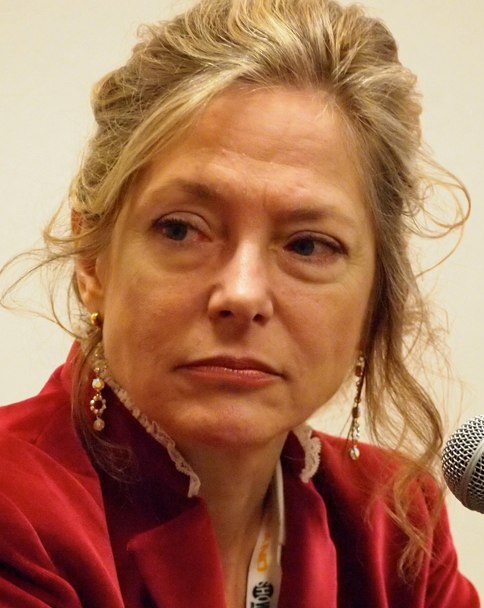
Susan J. Napier (pictured in 2012), the author

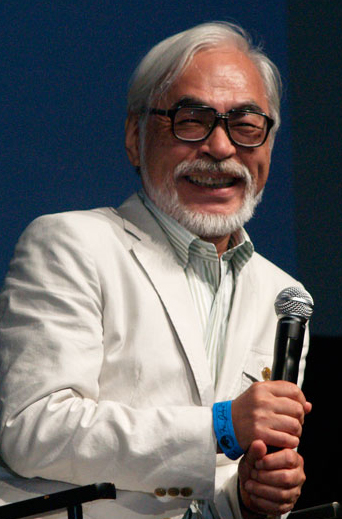
Hayao Miyazaki (pictured in 2009), the book's subject

Napier, a professor of rhetoric and Japanese studies at Tufts University, is an established anime scholar and has long been at the forefront of the academic examination of Hayao Miyazaki's works. The animation scholar Rayna Denison considered Napier's book Anime from Akira to Princess Mononoke (2001) to be a foundational work in the field of anime studies. Her earlier works analyzed Miyazaki's themes and style, and she later published examinations of his impact on fantasy media and the American anime and manga fandom.

She first met Miyazaki in 1992 during a visit to Studio Ghibli as part of the research for a book on anime. She had discovered his work while researching for that book and felt a full study was overdue. She later reflected that this encounter was what ultimately inspired her to write a book about him. In the following years she met him twice more, the third being an interview conducted after he had announced his retirement in 2013.

Napier developed Miyazakiworld over eight years, building upon a large volume of scholarship, including untranslated Japanese primary and secondary sources. She acknowledges Helen McCarthy's book Hayao Miyazaki: Master of Japanese Animation (1999) – the first full-length critical analysis of Miyazaki's filmography that laid the groundwork for the academic study of his work – as an inspiration for her book. She also expanded upon her previous writing which analyzed themes in Miyazaki's work.

== Publication and reception ==
The 344-page hardcover and the e-book were published by Yale University Press on September 4, 2018, and the paperback on November 19, 2019. The book filled a gap in English-language biographical coverage about the director at the time, and multiple reviewers felt the book would become foundational for future academic inquiry into Miyazaki's body of work. Writing for The Journal of Japanese Studies, Denison felt that the book was a compelling reading experience for both a general audience and scholars, and a "significant step forward in the nascent field of anime studies". Years later, she considered Miyazakiworld "Napier's most significant contribution" to the scholarship on the director, and the scholars Dominic J. Nardi and Keli Fancher considered it a "seminal" work in the field. In CINEJ Cinema Journal, Ayçin Ergin Akdaş felt Napier's development of ideas through each chapter made the book easier to read, and recommended that it be incorporated into educational programs. The animation scholar Jonathan Clements, in a review for Science Fiction Studies, said the work was "perfectly judged" as an introduction for undergraduate students, and The University Bookman's Titus Techera felt Napier's thorough research and neutral presentation were particular strengths to that end. C. B. Cannon highly recommended the book for all audiences in their review for Choice, awarding it three stars.

In a review for The Journal of Asian Studies, the animation scholar Shiro Yoshioka appreciated the contextualization of Miyazaki's animation work within his personal life and the surrounding culture of the time. Clements enjoyed the book's nuance and the diverse opportunities for further reading included in the bibliography, but wrote that it fell short of a comprehensive criticism of Miyazaki's body of work due to its focus being largely on his feature films. Denison concurred, but also felt that Napier often highlighted and analyzed aspects of Miyazaki's life not typically mentioned in other writing about him, and commended her exploration of controversial elements in Miyazaki's works. Reviewers appreciated the novel inclusion of certain written works, such as Princess Mononoke: The First Story (1983) (Note: Originally published as Princess Mononoke (Japanese: もののけ姫, Hepburn: Mononoke-hime)) and the Nausicaä of the Valley of the Wind manga; the book is among the few in English to analyze them. Clements felt that Napier's use of uncommon sources, especially the Japanese-language biography The Origin of Miyazaki Hayao: The Story of Mother and Son (2002) (Note: Japanese: 宮崎駿の原点: 母と子の物語, Hepburn: Miyazaki Hayao no genten: Haha to ko no monogatari) by Mitsunari Ōizumi, led her to create "a more intimate and revealing" book compared with previous work in English. In The Times Literary Supplement, Claire Kohda also commended the incorporation of archival interviews with Miyazaki.

A review in Publishers Weekly lauded the balance of biographical and analytical aspects, calling the book "the labor of both a consummate scholar and an avid fan". Denison felt that the book differentiates itself from a conventional biography by, rather than focusing on "scandalous revelations", using details from the director's life to inform appraisal of his art. She also appreciated the inclusion of relevant personal anecdotes, which she felt demonstrated Napier's passion and expertise. Yoshioka found Napier's writing style to be approachable while simultaneously maintaining scholarly rigor. Other reviewers agreed, including Rhea Rollmann of PopMatters, who wrote that Miyazakiworld was an "excellent volume". The animation scholar Mihaela Mihailova, writing in Monumenta Nipponica, felt the book offered a unique perspective on its subject despite two similar scholarly books being published in the same year. (Note: Raz Greenberg's Hayao Miyazaki: Exploring the Early Work of Japan's Greatest Animator and Rayna Denison's edited collection Princess Mononoke: Understanding Studio Ghibli's Monster Princess were also published in 2018 as part of a series by Bloomsbury Academic.) Reactor's Leah Schnelbach called Napier's discussion of Miyazaki's politics and environmental themes the best in the book, and praised her analysis of Spirited Away (2001) and Howl's Moving Castle (2004) "as meta-commentaries on Studio Ghibli itself". Shane Healy of the Tokyo Weekender found Napier's observations on Miyazaki's work illuminating and akin to "taking a peek inside his head".

Both Clements and Mihailova felt that the third chapter, which focuses on Miyazaki's early career in television animation, covers too wide a period and felt rushed as a result. Although Hyperallergic's Angelica Frey called the book "an essential work" for the field, she sought deeper discussion of Miyazaki's artistic influences. The Washington Post's Mark Jenkins found some words overused, and Mihailova noted Napier's arguments occasionally contradicted Miyazaki's statements. Techera felt the book did not explain Miyazaki's reverence in Japan, and Kohda also felt the omission of contextualizing his work's reception in the Western world was a "missed opportunity". According to Clements, inclusion of further Japanese-language material written by Miyazaki's colleagues – such as Mamoru Oshii and Steve Alpert – may have rendered the book more appealing for an academic audience. He also felt that the book lacked references to some important English-language sources, such as Andrew Osmond's reference work on Spirited Away, and did not include several biographical details which may have helped support the book's thesis.

== See also ==
- Hayao Miyazaki bibliography
