= Studio Ghibli: An Industrial History =

2023 reference work by Rayna Denison

- Author: Rayna Denison
- Genre: Reference
- Publisher: Palgrave Macmillan
- Publication date: 2023
- Media type: E-book; hardback; paperback
- Pages: 221
- ISBN: 978-3-0311-6844-4
- OCLC: 1371495046

Studio Ghibli: An Industrial History is a 2023 reference work by the animation scholar Rayna Denison. It studies the Japanese animation house Studio Ghibli, documenting the industrial and economic aspects of its history. The book was published by Palgrave Macmillan, and was reviewed in academic journals. Most commended it for its research, novel analyses, and presentation, but one was highly critical.

== Contents ==
Studio Ghibli is an academic study of the industrial and economic factors within the studio's history. It contains nine chapters which follow a roughly chronological order, with each exploring a thematic focus. The first chapter serves as an introduction to the work and an overview of the existing literature and discourse surrounding Studio Ghibli. Denison explains her methodology, which combines techniques across multiple academic disciplines, by which she analyses both individual creatives at the studio and the broader contexts in which they worked. The second and third chapters cover the studio's foundation and early years, addressing several myths prevalent about this period – such as that the studio was formed primarily as a vehicle for Hayao Miyazaki and Isao Takahata's directorial works – and providing alternative explanations.

The fourth chapter addresses the women on the staff, and how the studio's hiring and managerial processes compared to the feminist themes present in its films. The fifth describes the studio's adoption of computer animation in the 1990s, focusing on uses of computer-generated imagery in Pom Poko (1994) and Princess Mononoke (1997). Atypical subsets of the studio's creative work are evaluated in the sixth and seventh chapters, including the various exhibitions at the Ghibli Museum and Ghibli Park, and its catalogue of short films. The last two chapters cover the studio's legacy, its difficulties in finding a replacement figure for Miyazaki, and its experimentation with other media such as in Ni no Kuni: Dominion of the Dark Djinn (2010).

== Background ==
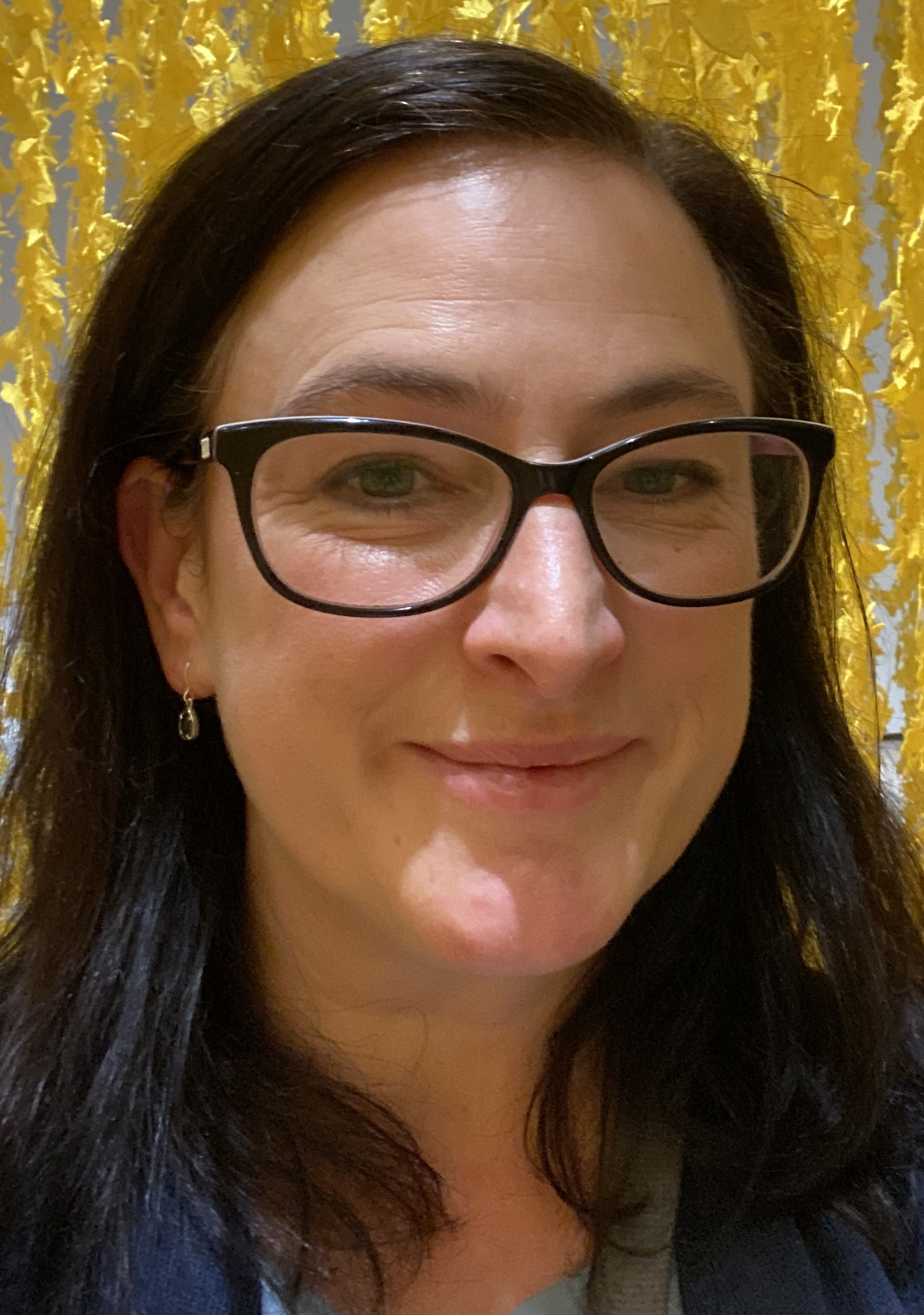
Rayna Denison (pictured in 2024), the author

Rayna Denison is a prominent animation scholar, and had previously published several papers about the studio and books such as Anime: A Critical Introduction (2015) and Princess Mononoke: Understanding Studio Ghibli's Monster Princess (2018), well-known in the field. However, existing animation scholarship either focused on analysing the studio's films or biographising Miyazaki; as its most prominent director, discussions about Studio Ghibli often revolved around him and his films. (Note: David Höwelkröger emphasised the prominence given to works such as Hayao Miyazaki: Master of Japanese Animation (1999), Hayao Miyazaki: Exploring the Early Work of Japan's Greatest Animator (2018), and Miyazakiworld: A Life in Art (2018) in previous scholarship about Studio Ghibli.) Studio Ghibli primarily covers the industry behind them, a perspective few English-language publications offered at the time. Additionally, while some books covered the animation industry more broadly – such as Jonathan Clements's Anime: A History (2013) and others – the major publications focusing on Studio Ghibli were only memoirs from staff within the studio.

== Publication and reception ==
The 221-page hardback and the e-book were published by Palgrave Macmillan in February 2023, and the paperback in February 2024. Reviewers appreciated the exploration of different viewpoints not then present in literature about Studio Ghibli; the animation scholar Zoe Crombie wrote that the book filled "numerous notable gaps" in the study of the studio. Crombie felt that the chapters covering Studio Ghibli's foundation and its women employees "actively challenge" common conceptions about these aspects of the studio. The animation journalist Andrew Osmond appreciated Denison's depth of research, book draws on several untranslated Japanese-language sources.

Reviewers also praised the book's organizational structure; Crombie felt that the choice to concentrate each chapter on a particular topic made them useful in an educational context. David Höwelkröger, writing for MEDIENwissenschaft, appreciated the contextualisation of the various specific anecdotes analysed within the broader thematic foci. He found the chapters' introductory sections to be particularly accessible, writing that fans of the studio would find them entertaining. Clements, reviewing for All the Anime, felt that Denison's methodology set a practical precedent for potential analyses of other companies, and that the work had "set a standard for many years to come".

However, Steve Alpert, a former executive at Studio Ghibli, was highly critical of the book in several areas in a review for Monumenta Nipponica. He felt that Denison had not accurately represented concepts about computer animation, and said that her discussion of the studio's computer graphics department "made [him] laugh". Denison assumes the reader is familiar with the notable works of Studio Ghibli scholarship, and Alpert wrote that he found some of the book's arguments difficult to follow as a result. Osmond also emphasised the potentially prohibitive price of the hardback.
