= Francis M. Agnoli =

American animation scholar

Francis M. Agnoli is an American animation scholar.

== Biography ==
Agnoli received his Doctor of Philosophy from the University of East Anglia. His doctoral thesis – completed under Rayna Denison and Frederik Byrn Køhlert as advisors – analyzed depictions of race within the television series Avatar: The Last Airbender (2005–2008) and The Legend of Korra (2012–2014).

He contributed a chapter to a 2018 edited collection, Fantasy/Animation: Connections Between Media, Mediums and Genres, focused on The Tale of the Fox (1937), which the animation scholar Raz Greenberg identified as a well-known work in need of academic discussion. In 2023, he served as the collection editor of The Avatar Television Franchise: Storytelling, Identity, Trauma and Fandom.

Later that year, he published Race and the Animated Bodyscape, an examination of several components of racial presentation within Avatar and Korra, including its animation, voice acting, music, and worldbuilding. The scholar Xinyu Chen called it "a significant contribution to the fields of animation and television studies" for presenting an atypical analysis of animated race.

== Selected bibliography ==
- ——— (2018). "Fantastic French fox: the national identity of Le roman de renard (1941) as an animated film". In Holliday, Christopher; Sergeant, Alexander (eds.). Fantasy/Animation: Connections Between Media, Mediums and Genres. Routledge. ISBN 978-1-138-05437-0.
- Mes, Tom; ——— (2021). "A modular genre? Problems in the reception of the post-Miyazaki 'Ghibli film'". Animation. 16 (3): 207–220. doi:10.1177/17468477211049360. ISSN 1746-8477.
- ———, ed. (2023). The Avatar Television Franchise: Storytelling, Identity, Trauma and Fandom. Bloomsbury Academic. ISBN 978-1-5013-8717-3.
- ——— (2023). Race and the Animated Bodyscape: Constructing and Ascribing a Racialized Asian Identity in Avatar and Korra. University Press of Mississippi. ISBN 978-1-4968-4509-2.
