= Howl's Moving Castle (film) =

2004 film by Hayao Miyazaki

- Theatrical release poster

Japanese name
- Kanji: ハウルの動く城
Transcriptions
- Revised Hepburn: Hauru no Ugoku Shiro
- Directed by: Hayao Miyazaki
- Screenplay by: Hayao Miyazaki
- Based on: Howl's Moving Castle by Diana Wynne Jones
- Produced by: Toshio Suzuki
- Starring: Chieko Baisho; Takuya Kimura; Akihiro Miwa
- Cinematography: Atsushi Okui
- Edited by: Takeshi Seyama
- Music by: Joe Hisaishi
- Production company: Studio Ghibli
- Distributed by: Toho
- Release dates: 5 September 2004 (Venice); 20 November 2004 (Japan)
- Running time: 119 minutes
- Country: Japan
- Language: Japanese
- Budget: $24 million
- Box office: $236 million

Howl's Moving Castle (Note: Japanese: ハウルの動く城, Hepburn: Hauru no Ugoku Shiro) is a 2004 Japanese animated fantasy film written and directed by Hayao Miyazaki, based on Diana Wynne Jones' 1986 novel. The film was produced by Toshio Suzuki, animated by Studio Ghibli, and distributed by Toho. It stars the voices of Chieko Baisho, Takuya Kimura, and Akihiro Miwa. The film is set in a fictional kingdom where both magic and early 20th-century technology are prevalent, against the backdrop of a war with another kingdom. It tells the story of Sophie, a young milliner who is turned into an elderly woman by a witch who enters her shop and curses her. She encounters a wizard named Howl and gets caught up in his refusal to fight for the king.

Influenced by Miyazaki's opposition to the United States' invasion of Iraq in 2003, the film contains strong anti-war themes. Miyazaki stated that he "had a great deal of rage" about the Iraq War, which led him to make a film that he felt would be poorly received in the United States. It also explores the theme of old age, depicting age positively as something that grants the protagonist freedom. The film contains feminist elements and carries messages about the value of compassion. The film differs significantly in theme from the novel; while the novel focuses on challenging class and gender norms, the film focuses on love, personal loyalty, and the destructive effects of war.

Howl's Moving Castle premiered at the 61st Venice International Film Festival on 5 September 2004, and was theatrically released in Japan on 20 November. It went on to gross $190 million in Japan and $46 million outside Japan, making it one of the most commercially successful Japanese films in history. The film received critical acclaim, with particular praise for its visuals and Miyazaki's presentation of the themes. It was nominated for the Academy Award for Best Animated Feature at the 78th Academy Awards, but lost to Wallace & Gromit: The Curse of the Were-Rabbit. It won several other awards, including four Tokyo Anime Awards and a Nebula Award for Best Script.

== Plot ==
Sophie, a young milliner and eldest of three sisters, encounters a wizard named Howl on her way to visit her sister Lettie. Upon returning home, she meets the Witch of the Waste, who transforms her into the form of an old woman, unable to reveal the curse. Seeking to break the curse, Sophie leaves home and sets off through the countryside. She meets a living scarecrow, whom she calls "Turnip Head". He leads her to Howl's moving castle, which she enters without invitation. She subsequently meets Howl's young apprentice Markl and a fire demon named Calcifer, the source of the castle's magic and movement. Calcifer makes a deal with Sophie, agreeing to break her curse if she breaks his link with Howl. When Howl appears, Sophie announces that Calcifer has hired her as a cleaning lady.

Meanwhile, Sophie's nation is at war with a neighboring kingdom, which is searching for its missing prince. The King summons Howl to fight in the war. However, Howl decides to send Sophie, under the pretense of being his mother, to tell the king that Howl is too much of a coward to fight. Before leaving, he gives Sophie a charmed ring that leads her to Calcifer and guarantees her safety. Sophie meets Suliman, the king's head sorceress, and also the Witch of the Waste, whom Suliman punishes by draining all of her power and reverting her to her true age, thus reducing her to a harmless and very old woman. Suliman warns Sophie that Howl will meet the same fate if he does not fight for the King. Howl then arrives to rescue Sophie. Suliman tries to trap him by turning him into a monster, but with Sophie's help, he remembers himself and barely avoids the trap. The duo escapes along with the Witch of the Waste and Suliman's dog Heen. Soldiers break into the homes of both Jenkins and Pendragon (Howl's two aliases), only to find them abandoned buildings in disguise; the castle's magical door had allowed travel through both false shopfronts.

Sophie learns that Howl's life is somehow bound to Calcifer's and that Howl has been transforming into a bird-like creature to interfere with both sides in the war, but each transformation makes it more difficult for him to return to human form. Howl then has the castle magically linked to Sophie's home, parking the castle itself on the town's outskirts. A few days later, the town is bombed by enemy aircraft and Suliman's henchmen attack the house and Sophie's hat shop. Howl heads out to protect the group. Sophie then moves everyone out of the house and removes Calcifer from the fireplace, which collapses the castle. The Witch of the Waste realizes that Calcifer possesses Howl's heart and grabs the fire demon, setting herself on fire. Sophie panics and pours water onto the Witch, which douses Calcifer. The remainder of the castle then splits in two; Sophie falls down a chasm and is separated from the group.

Following the charmed ring, Sophie wanders into a scene from the past, where she sees a young Howl catch a falling star – Calcifer – and give him his heart. Sophie calls for them to find her in the future as she is teleported away. She returns to the present, finds Howl, and they reunite with the others. The Witch returns Howl's heart, and Sophie places it back inside Howl, reviving him and freeing Calcifer, though he decides to stay. Sophie's curse is broken, though her hair remains silver. After she kisses Turnip Head on the cheek, he returns to human form, revealing himself to be Justin, the missing prince from the enemy kingdom. He reveals that only his true love's kiss can break his curse. After seeing Sophie's affection lies with Howl, he promptly heads for home to cease the war, but promises he will see them again. Suliman, watching through a crystal globe, also decides to end the war. Sometime later, bombers fly under dark skies over a recovered and green countryside headed to another war, while Sophie, Howl, and the others travel in the opposite direction in a new flying castle. As the castle soars away, Howl and Sophie kiss on the castle's balcony.

== Voice cast ==
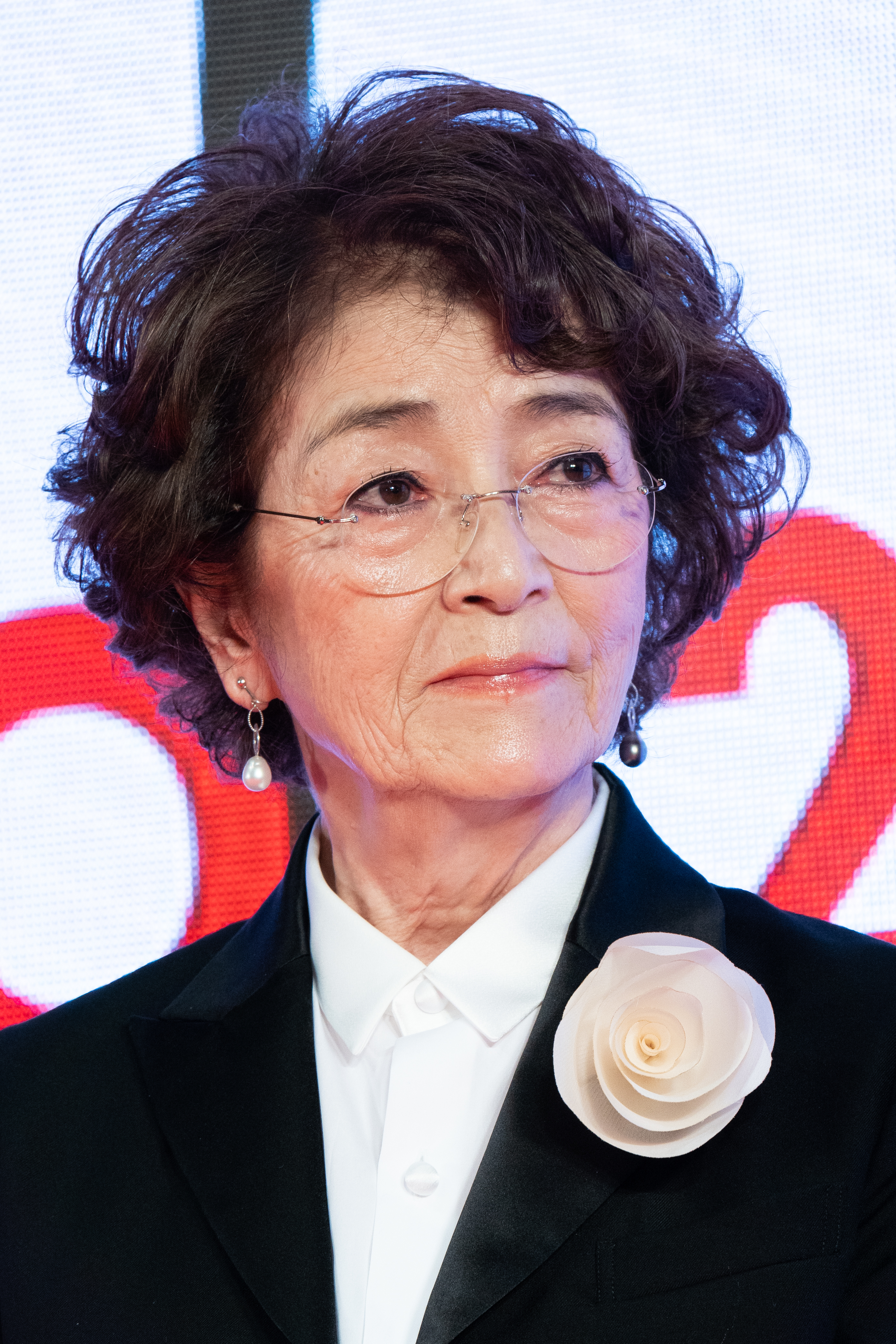
Chieko Baisho voiced Sophie in Japanese.

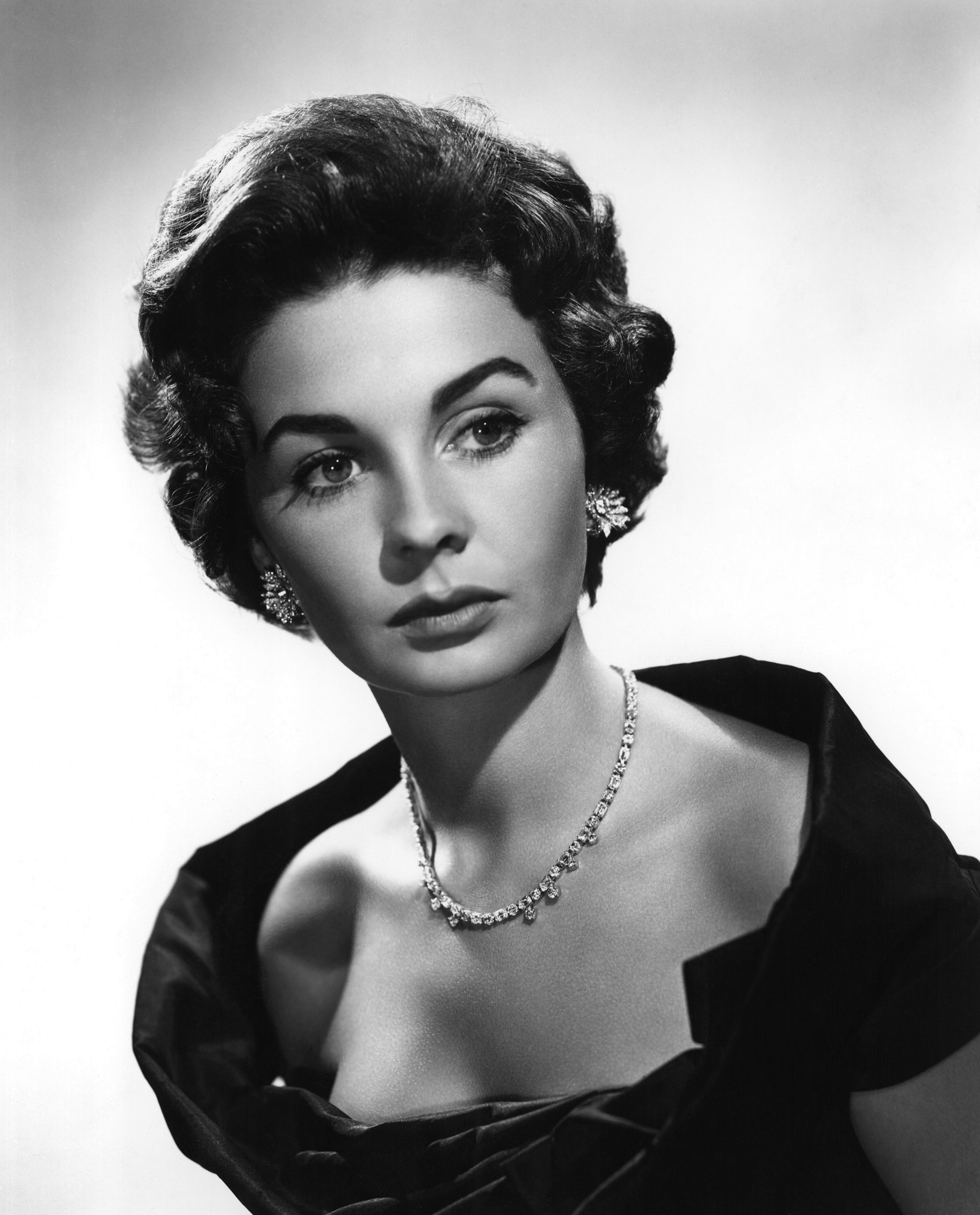
Jean Simmons voiced older Sophie in the English version.

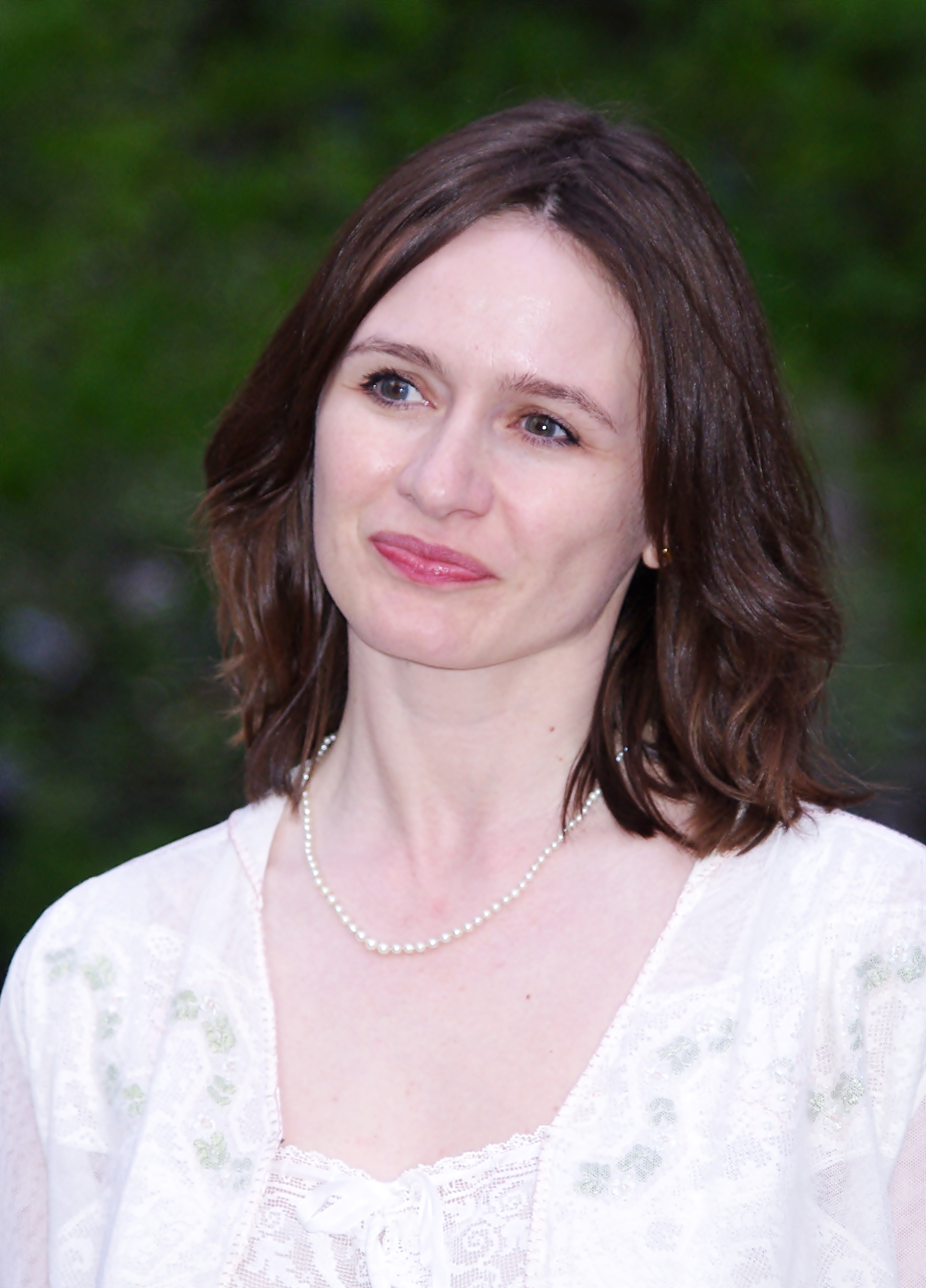
Emily Mortimer voiced the young Sophie in English.

Character	Japanese voice actor	English voice actor
Sophie Hatter (ソフィー・ハッター, Sofī Hattā)	Chieko Baisho	Emily Mortimer (young)
Sophie Hatter (ソフィー・ハッター, Sofī Hattā)	Chieko Baisho	Jean Simmons (old)
Howl (ハウル, Hauru)	Takuya Kimura	Christian Bale
Witch of the Waste (荒地の魔女, Arechi no Majo)	Akihiro Miwa	Lauren Bacall
Calcifer (カルシファー, Karushifā)	Tatsuya Gashūin	Billy Crystal
Markl (マルクル, Marukuru)	Ryūnosuke Kamiki	Josh Hutcherson
Suliman (サリマン, Sariman)	Haruko Kato	Blythe Danner
Lettie (レティー, Retī)	Yayoi Kazuki	Jena Malone
Honey (ハニー, Hanī)	Unknown	Mari Devon
Prince Justin / Turnip Head (カブ, Kabu)	Yō Ōizumi	Crispin Freeman
King of Ingary (国王, Kokuō)	Akio Ōtsuka	Mark Silverman
Heen (ヒン, Hin)	Daijiro Harada	Dee Bradley Baker (uncredited)

== Themes ==
=== Pacifism ===
Howl's Moving Castle contains strong anti-war themes, influenced by Miyazaki's distaste for the 2003 Iraq War, as well as the longer global history of aerial bombing since World War I. When he received an Oscar for Spirited Away, he said that he "had a great deal of rage about [the war]. So [he] felt some hesitation about the award." Miyazaki identifies as a pacifist. On the eve of the Iraq War, Miyazaki decided to make a film that he felt would be poorly received in the United States. The brutality and futility of warfare are graphically depicted in the film; entire cities are set aflame, and the titular castle is made to fall apart. Animation scholar Susan J. Napier writes that Howl is placed under a "spiritual form of curse", his horror and fury growing throughout the film as he witnesses the fighting. According to film critics Colin Odell and Michelle Le Blanc, the film shows people being exploited and "[turned] into something they are not", in many cases in service of a political agenda. Napier also draws a comparison to the character San of Princess Mononoke; she and Howl are isolated from humanity by circumstance, and both ultimately go to war to defend the goodness in their lives.

The universe of Howl's Moving Castle is depicted as not having clear-cut villains and heroes; instead, the characters are complex, and even those that are initially portrayed in a negative light, such as Howl, are shown as capable of change. The film also combines scenes of war and violence with softer moments focused on the characters. Matt Kimmich stated, however, that the simplistic message of the film is that "war is bad". A scene where Sophie is standing in a beautiful field of flowers is interrupted by a war machine, "a finger accusing empire as the destroyer of peace." This portrayal is in contrast to other Miyazaki films like Princess Mononoke, which criticizes military conflict in a more nuanced manner. Andrew Osmond stated that "Howl's pure-hearted anti-war stance is presented as nihilism with no alternative as he fights forces from each side and becomes the worst terror of all", in the form of the monstrous bird. By transforming into the bird, Howl risks losing his humanity; Calcifer comments at one point that he will soon not be able to return to human form. In contrast, Ashitaka in Princess Mononoke fights the demonic sickness with which he is afflicted, and tries to negotiate peace between the two sides. Osmond states that both films also point out the limits of masculinity, as exemplified by Howl and Ashitaka.

=== Flight and critique of modernity ===
Like several other Miyazaki films, Howl's Moving Castle reflects the director's love of flying. The nuanced view of flight is part of Miyazaki's broader critique of modern society and technology. Margaret Talbot writes that in person, Miyazaki exhibits "a profound dissatisfaction with modern life," particularly with the effects of technology and a disconnection from nature. Many of his films depict technological hubris as among the roots of evil. According to Carl and Garrath Wilson, the battleships that are seen moving over the landscape are depicted as "gleaming with modernity and parading righteousness", but are then shown to be highly destructive. In contrast, they write that the semi-organic castle demonstrates "Miyazaki's Taoist presentation of industrialism needing to be aligned with nature". Anthony Lioi writes that Miyazaki often depicts beautiful scenes in contrast to those containing symbols of modernity, such as the scene where Sophie's reverie is interrupted by a war machine. This contrast is part of an ecological criticism of modernity, but Miyazaki also offers an alternative, in the form of beautiful natural scenery.

=== Old age and compassion ===
Miyazaki stated that an attractive aspect of the story of Howl's Moving Castle was the relatively positive light it shed on growing old. When Sophie becomes old as a result of the witch's spell, she also feels more able to speak her mind. According to Miyazaki, old women are only infrequently allowed to dominate the screen as in Howl's Moving Castle, which made it a risky concept. Elizabeth Parsons stated that the film disrupts the stereotype of "aged unattractiveness," when the artificially aged Sophie manages to rescue two attractive men (who come to love her) and to unintentionally end the war in her country. Sophie's actions are those usually associated with grandmothers, such as being kind and nurturing to those around her, and engaging in housework; however, these actions are depicted as being powerful and heroic. Napier writes that, in this way, the film is also "a kind of valentine" to Miyazaki's older female colleagues at Studio Ghibli. Sophie is one of several strong female protagonists in Miyazaki's films. According to Parsons, this gives the film a feminist aspect as well. Additionally, even though Sophie manages to make her presence in the castle legitimate by claiming to be a cleaning lady, the film goes on to show that the housework is equitably distributed, strengthening its feminist aspect.

Several of the protagonists in Miyazaki's films, such as Ashitaka and San in Princess Mononoke and Sheeta and Pazu in Castle in the Sky learn to survive by showing compassion. Throughout the film, Howl, its most vain and selfish character, also learns to put others before himself. When Madame Suliman returns the Witch of the Waste to her true form as a decrepit old woman, Sophie takes her in and cares for her, despite the witch being responsible for Sophie's curse, thus strongly demonstrating the idea of compassion. The witch then nearly destroys Howl through her selfish behavior but also helps save the castle at the end. Parsons writes that "In Miyazaki's balancing act, old women can be powerful and weak, positive and negative, nurturing and selfish, maligned and loved; in short, they can not be simply categorized or stereotyped, and they can not be dismissed as fantasy malefactors embodied by evil witches." They are also given a lot of space in the film as active characters, something not commonly found in Western movies.

== Production ==
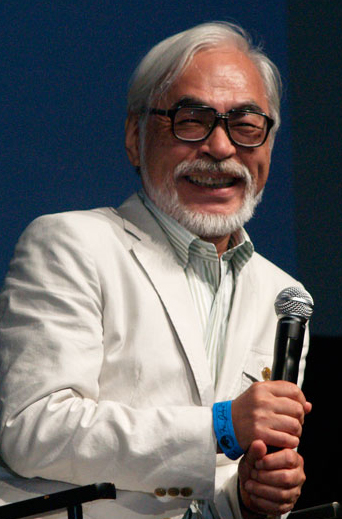
Director and screenwriter Hayao Miyazaki in 2009

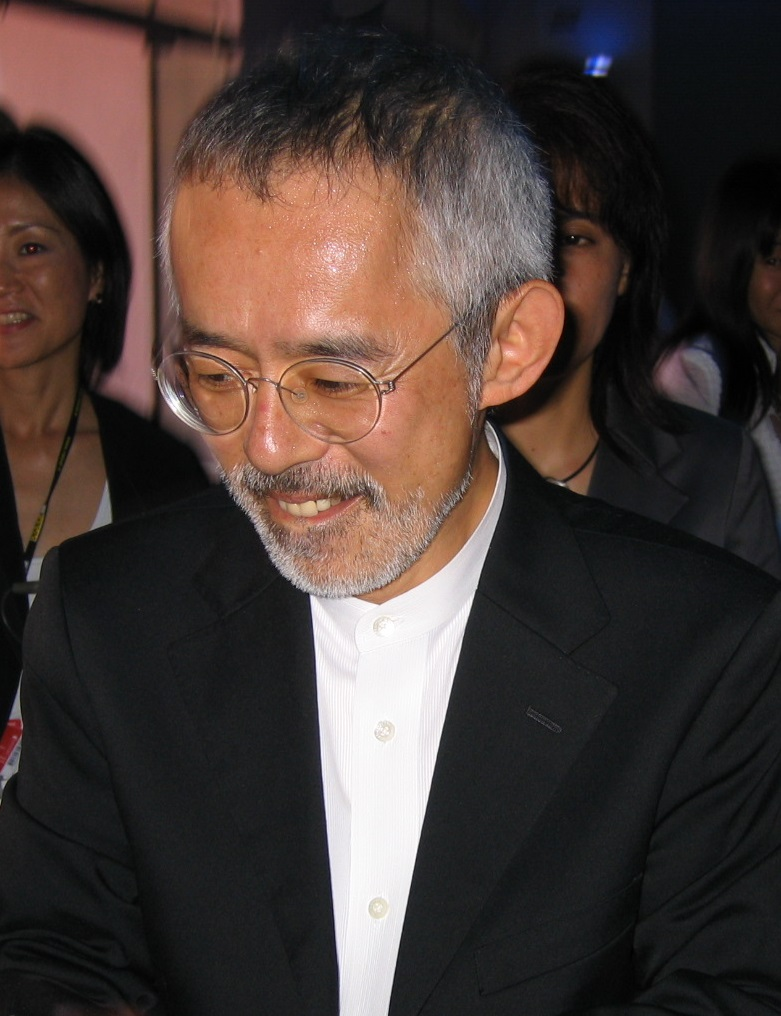
Toshio Suzuki, the film's producer, at its premiere

In September 2001, Studio Ghibli announced the production of two films. The first would become The Cat Returns and the second was an adaptation of Diana Wynne Jones' novel, Howl's Moving Castle. Toshio Suzuki, who produced Howl's Moving Castle, stated that Miyazaki was inspired to make the film when he read Jones' novel, and was struck by the image of a castle moving around the countryside. The novel does not explain how the castle moved, and Miyazaki was interested in figuring out how the castle might move, which led to the image of a castle on chicken legs.

Mamoru Hosoda of Toei Animation was originally selected to direct the film but quit the project after Studio Ghibli's executives rejected many of his concept ideas. The film was shelved until Miyazaki took over. The project resumed production in February 2003. It was scheduled to be completed in the spring of 2004, and released in the summer of that year.

Miyazaki went to Colmar and Riquewihr in Alsace, France, to study the architecture and the surroundings for the setting of the film. Additional inspiration came from the concepts of futuristic technology in Albert Robida's work. Commentators have stated that Miyazaki's imagery was influenced by his fondness for the "illusion art" of 19th-century Europe. Suzuki stated that unlike many Western films, in which the imagery went "from the general [to] the specific," Miyazaki employed a uniquely Japanese approach, frequently beginning with a very specific image and moving from there. However, Howl's Moving Castle, and Miyazaki films in general, have a focus on realistic imagery in a way that other anime films do not.

The film was produced digitally, but the original backgrounds were drawn by hand and painted before being digitized, and the characters were also drawn by hand before scanning them into the computer. The 1400 storyboard cuts for the film were completed on 16 January 2004. On 25 June the in-between animation was completed and checking was completed on 26 June. Like with the other Studio Ghibli movies, the film was co-produced with other companies, which were Tokuma Shoten, the Nippon Television Network, Dentsu, Buena Vista Home Entertainment, Mitsubishi and Toho.

== Comparisons between film and novel ==
The film has several differences from the novel, partly due to the different requirements of the two media. Diana Wynne Jones' novel has a very large cast of characters and several plot threads that were too complex to be transferred into the film. As a result, characters such as Sophie's second sister Martha are left out, as is the plot thread involving Markl (who is called Michael in the novel and depicted as an adolescent, rather than as a young boy) courting her. Jones discussed the film with Studio Ghibli representatives but did not have any input or involvement in the production of the film. Miyazaki traveled to England in the summer of 2004 to give Jones a private viewing of the finished film. She has been quoted as saying "It's fantastic. No, I have no input—I write books, not films. Yes, it will be different from the book—in fact it's likely to be very different, but that's as it should be. It will still be a fantastic film."

The novel depicts Howl's castle as a tall, dark, and sinister wizard's tower, very different from the complex image in the film. The film's castle may be seen as a parody of the machines seen in the movie, driven both by steam engines and by magic. In the film, it is a "rotund collage of chimneys, roofs, steam pipes, and other odd appendages, borne along on mechanized bird legs" that is similar to Baba Yaga's hut in the popular fairy tale. It is vaguely organic, and almost depicted as a life-form. Similarly, Calcifer is a demonic figure in the book, as compared to the "endearing" persona and image that he has in the film. Both film and novel try to render fantastic elements as mundane and ordinary things. Although they are set in a fantasy universe, the characters are often shown performing routine tasks, like cooking breakfast or washing up, in contrast to the heroic actions typical of a fantasy universe. In the novel, Jones disrupts the fantasy-world setting by including scenes in which the characters travel to the real-world Wales. The movie, however, avoids this digression and maintains a constant setting.

Miyazaki's biggest addition to the plot of the book was making the war a major part of it. In the book, the war is only tangentially referred to; the king orders Howl to find the king's missing brother Justin because Justin's military skills are needed for a forthcoming war. Howl's frequent disappearances are because of his womanizing habits, which makes Sophie see him as a superficial and cowardly person. In the film, however, Howl disappears to transform into a giant bird and disrupt the battle plans of both armies.

The roles of several characters also differ between the novel and film due to this plot change. The Witch of the Waste is the chief antagonist of the book, whereas in the film she is reduced by Madame Suliman's magic to an ultimately harmless old woman who evokes sympathy in the audience and Sophie. In contrast, the film conflates the novel's two characters of Mrs. Penstemmon and the wizard Suliman into Madame Suliman. Although Suliman comes closest to being a traditional villain in the film, she is shown as having ambiguous motivations, and reviewers have stated that the real villain is war itself. Howl loses the "rakish" womanizing aspect that was a significant part of his character in the novel. In contrast, Sophie becomes a more conventional figure in the film; she is less grumpy and outspoken, and demonstrates her love for Howl earlier and more explicitly. The storyline in the novel of Sophie being a powerful sorceress in her own right is muted in the film, although she is still shown to have control over her curse.

The thematic focus of the story also differs between the novel and the film. Reviewer Antonia Levi wrote that the experience of watching the film was similar to reading high-quality fan fiction; although the characters and the setting were the same, the story was different. Although in both cases the story begins with Sophie being a prisoner of her circumstances and social norms, the challenges she faces are slightly different. Levi said that "Jones uses Sophie, Howl, and Calcifer in a fairytale format to tell a story about challenging class and gender expectations, Miyazaki uses the same characters to tell a story about personal loyalty, love, and war."

== Music ==
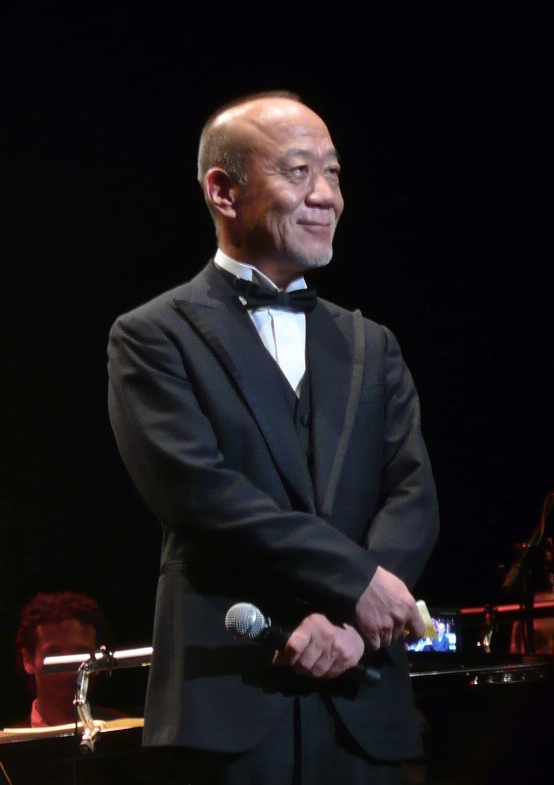
Joe Hisaishi, who composed and conducted the score, in 2011

The score was composed and conducted by Joe Hisaishi, and performed by the New Japan Philharmonic. The soundtrack CD was first released on 19 November 2004 by Tokuma Japan Communications. Hisaishi also composed and conducted Howl's Moving Castle: Symphony Suite, an album published on 21 January 2004 which includes ten re-arranged pieces from the original soundtrack. He and Youmi Kimura also composed Howl's Moving Castle CD Maxi-Single, a CD single published on 27 October 2004 which includes the film's theme song, sung by Chieko Baisho (the Japanese voice actor for Sophie), its karaoke version, and a piano version of the film's main theme, "The Merry-Go-Round of Life".

== Release and reception ==
=== Box office ===
The film opened at the 61st Venice Film Festival in 2004, and was released in Japan on 20 November 2004. The film grossed $14.5 million in its first week of release in Japan. The film was distributed in Japan by Toho, and made $190 million in that country. It was distributed internationally by various companies, and made an additional $46 million outside Japan, for a worldwide total of $236 million. The film was later dubbed into English under the supervision of Pete Docter of Pixar, and released in the United States by Walt Disney Studios on 10 June 2005. It was one of the most commercially successful Japanese films ever made. Soon after its release, it became the third most financially successful film in Japan, behind Titanic and Spirited Away. It has since received multiple worldwide theatrical re-releases, including at the annual Studio Ghibli Fest organized by GKIDS.

=== Home media ===
On home video, Howl's Moving Castle sold 2.7 million DVD units in Japan as of May 2007, and grossed over $18 million from Blu-ray and DVD sales in the United States as of April 2022. It was released in the United States on DVD on 7 March 2006 and on Blu-ray by Walt Disney Studios Home Entertainment on 21 May 2013. GKIDS re-released the film on Blu-ray and DVD on 17 October 2017.

In the United Kingdom, the film's Studio Ghibli anniversary release was 2015's eighth best-selling foreign language film on home video, and fifth best-selling Japanese film (below four other Studio Ghibli anime films). It was later 2018's fourth best-selling foreign language film in the UK (below the Japanese films My Neighbor Totoro, Your Name and Blade of the Immortal).

=== Critical response ===
On the review aggregator website Rotten Tomatoes, 88% of 185 critics' reviews are positive, with an average rating of 7.7/10. The website's consensus reads: "Exquisitely illustrated by master animator Miyazaki, Howl's Moving Castle will delight children with its fantastical story and touch the hearts and minds of older viewers as well." The film also holds an 82/100 average on Metacritic, based on 40 reviews, indicating "universal acclaim".

USA Today critic Claudia Puig gave the film a positive review, praising it for its ability to blend "a childlike sense of wonder with sophisticated emotions and motives". Helen McCarthy in 500 Essential Anime Movies said that the natural world was "beautifully represented", with "some absolutely breathtaking mountains and lakeside landscapes". She also praised the design of the castle and added that Miyazaki added his own themes to the film: "man's relationship to nature, the futility of war, and the joy of flight". Steven Pearce of The Encyclopedia of Science Fiction likewise praised the film's imaginative steampunk setting and animation, describing its aerial bombardment scenes as horrifying but visually stunning. He emphasized the film's anti-war message, which he related to Miyazaki's opposition to the Iraq War, noting that this gave the adaptation a different focus from the original novel. Joe Morgenstern of The Wall Street Journal called the film "a moveable feast of delights". Richard Corliss of Time wrote, "Palaces and shimmering lakes, warplanes and fire sprites all come to life at the breath of Miyazaki's graphic genius." Writing for The Boston Globe, Ty Burr said, "At its best, 'Howl's Moving Castle' offers a rich fantasy of adolescent escape, of romance in the old and epic sense. At its worst, it's the most amazing 12-course meal you can't bring yourself to finish." A.O. Scott of The New York Times wrote, "Admirers of [Hayao Miyazaki's] work, which is wildly imaginative, emotionally intense and surpassingly gentle, will find much to appreciate in this film because it demonstrates, once again, his visual ingenuity and his sensitivity as a storyteller. For newcomers to his world, "Howl's Moving Castle" is a fitting introduction to one of modern cinema's great enchanters."

Conversely, Roger Ebert of the Chicago Sun-Times gave the film two and a half out of four stars, and called it a "disappointment" compared to Miyazaki's other recent movies. Jonathan Trout of the BBC said, "Youngsters and Miyazaki fans will coo at the world's depth and rich surreality, but opaque plotting, and a tendency to mope with Sophie whilst Howl is off affecting events let the momentum of the first act vanish into thin air." Writing for Salon, Stephanie Zacharek said, "the plot of Howl's Moving Castle meanders so listlessly that its details become less and less charming. Miyazaki's storytelling style resembles that of a breathless young tot who's fearlessly exercising his newfound powers of expression." Stephen Hunter from The Washington Post criticized the plot of the film, saying "There is no story, or rather, there's no force to the story, which meanders almost casually this way and that for no apparent reason." However, he said that the movie also empowered young women, and was "beautiful beyond telling." Pearce, meanwhile, highlighted the film's unusual emphasis on the virtues of old age, observing that Sophie's transformation allows her to develop confidence, wisdom and empathy, while her relationship with Howl helps him overcome his emotional immaturity. He interpreted Sophie's changing appearance as a reflection of her growing maturity and personal agency. David Rooney, writing in Variety, stated that "the narrative motor roars ahead in the opening hour and is more erratic thereafter," and suggested that better translation would help. Pearce similarly found some plot elements insufficiently explained and the ending somewhat abrupt, particularly compared with the novel's more complex plotting, although he ultimately considered the film entertaining, inventive and memorable. Literary scholar Matt Kimmich stated that the film came across as "uneasy compromise between two plots and two imaginations," referring to Jones' original story and Miyazaki's style of animation and storytelling. However, he stated that those scenes which were not dependent either on Jones' original plot or Miyazaki's added plot threads found "a visual humor that recalls the verbal wit and lightness of Jones's novel," and that the "animation manages to free itself from the demands of the two plots—and flies."

=== Top ten lists ===
There's a word for the kind of comic, dramatic, romantic, transporting visions Miyazaki achieves in Howl's: bliss.

— Peter Travers, Rolling Stone

The film appeared on many critics' top ten lists of the best films of 2005.

- 2nd – Ella Taylor, LA Weekly (tie)
- 4th – Kenneth Turan, Los Angeles Times
- 5th – Tasha Robinson, The A.V. Club
- 6th – Lawrence Toppman, The Charlotte Observer
- 6th – Jonathan Rosenbaum, The Chicago Reader (tie)
- 8th – Michael Sragow, The Baltimore Sun
- 8th – Michael Wilmington, The Chicago Tribune
- NA – Peter Rainer, The Christian Science Monitor (listed alphabetically)

=== Accolades ===
Year	Award	Category	Result	Recipient	Ref.
2004	61st Venice Film Festival	Osella Awards for Technical Achievement	Won	Howl's Moving Castle	
2004	Mainichi Film Awards	Best Japanese Movie Overall (Readers' Choice Award)	Won	Howl's Moving Castle	
2004	Japan Media Arts Festival	Excellence Prize, Animation	Won	Howl's Moving Castle	
2005	Tokyo Anime Award	Animation of the Year	Won	Howl's Moving Castle	
2005	Tokyo Anime Award	Best Director	Won	Hayao Miyazaki	
2005	Tokyo Anime Award	Best Voice Actor/Actress	Won	Chieko Baisho	
2005	Tokyo Anime Award	Best Music	Won	Joe Hisaishi	
2005	Maui Film Festival	Audience Award	Won	Howl's Moving Castle	
2005	Seattle International Film Festival	Golden Space Needle Award	Runner-up	Howl's Moving Castle	
2006	78th Academy Awards	Best Animated Feature	Nominated	Hayao Miyazaki	
2006	Saturn Awards	Best Animated Film	Nominated	Howl's Moving Castle	
2007	Nebula Award	Best Script	Won	Hayao Miyazaki (script)	
2007	Nebula Award	Best Script	Won	Cindy Davis Hewitt and Donald H. Hewitt (English translation)	

== Legacy ==
In 2019, the Cité internationale de la tapisserie in Aubusson collaborated with Studio Ghibli to make five tapestries based on works by Hayao Miyazaki from 2019 to 2024; two depict scenes from Howl's Moving Castle. In 2025, the film ranked 96th on The New York Times's readers' choice list of "The 100 Best Movies of the 21st Century". The fashion house Loewe released a line of merchandise themed around the film in 2023.

== See also ==
- List of films about witchcraft

== Sources ==
- "Japanese Walt Disney - Film - Entertainment - theage.com.au". The Age. 18 September 2005. Archived from the original on 14 October 2014.
- Akimoto, Daisuke (2014). "Howl's Moving Castle in the war on terror". Electronic Journal of Contemporary Japanese Studies. 14 (2). ISSN 1476-9158.
- "Howl Nominated for Saturn Award". animenewsnetwork. 21 February 2006.
- "2004 Mainichi Film Awards". animenewsnetwork. 24 January 2005.
- Statistical Yearbook 2016 (PDF). United Kingdom: British Film Institute (BFI). 2016. p. 144.
- Statistical Yearbook 2019 (PDF). United Kingdom: British Film Institute (BFI). 2019. pp. 103–4.
- "Howl's Moving Castle". Box Office Mojo. IMDb. Archived from the original on 21 September 2025.
- "Official Awards of the 61st Venice Film Festival". labiennale.org/. 11 September 2004. Archived from the original on 9 October 2004.
- Burr, Ty (10 June 2005). "Though unintelligible at times, Miyazaki's 'Castle' is magical". The Boston Globe.
- Corliss, Richard (5 June 2005). "Movies: For Children of All Ages". TIME. Archived from the original on 31 January 2021.
- David, Margaret (27 September 2022). "The 12 Best Studio Ghibli Movies, According To Letterboxd - Did They Get It Right?". /Film.
- "Music in the movies: Joe Hisaishi". Den of Geek. Archived from the original on 15 December 2017.
- Douard, Lisa (21 May 2023). "À Aubusson, Miyazaki fait tapisserie" [In Aubusson, Miyazaki makes tapestries]. Libération (in French). Archived from the original on 21 May 2023.
- Ebert, Roger (9 June 2005). "Howl's Moving Castle Movie Review (2005)". RogerEbert.com.
- Geoghegan, Kev (5 December 2011). "Howl's Moving Castle adapted for the stage in Southwark". BBC.
- Giardina, Carolyn (17 July 2017). "Gkids, Studio Ghibli Ink Home Entertainment Deal". The Hollywood Reporter.
- Gordon, Devin (2005). "A 'Positive Pessimist'". The Hayao Miyazaki Web.
- Groening, Stephen (2026). "An Antiwar Film in the Subjunctive Mood". Mechademia. 18 (2): 185–204.
- Hunter, Stephen (10 June 2005). "The Emperor Has No Story". The Washington Post. Archived from the original on 20 November 2016.
- "2004 Japan Media Arts Festival Awards" (in Japanese). Japan Media Arts Plaza, Agency for Cultural Affairs. Archived from the original on 4 April 2010.
- Levi, Antonia (2008). "Howl's Moving Castle". Mechademia. 3: 261–263. doi:10.1353/mec.0.0059. S2CID 201752967.
- Kimmich, Matt (2007). "Animating the Fantastic: Hayao Miyazaki's Adaptation of Diana Wynne Jones's Howl's Moving Castle". In Straytner, Leslie; Keller, James R. (eds.). Fantasy Fiction into Film. Jefferson, North Carolina: McFarland & Company.
- Lioi, Anthony (2010). "The City Ascends: Laputa: Castle in the Sky as Critical Ecotopia". Interdisciplinary Comics Studies. 5 (2).
- "The Locus Index to SF Awards: 2007 Nebula Awards". Locus. Archived from the original on 5 June 2011.
- McCarthy, Helen (2009). 500 Essential Anime Movies: The Ultimate Guide. HarperCollins. ISBN 978-0-06-147450-7.
- "Metacritic: 2007 Film Critic Top Ten Lists". Metacritic. Archived from the original on 14 December 2007.
- "Howl's Moving Castle". Metacritic.
- Miyazaki, Hayao (2005). The Art of Howl's Moving Castle. Translated by Ohiki, Yuki; Searleman, Erik. Viz Media. ISBN 978-1-4215-0049-2.
- Miyazaki, Hayao (2014). Turning Point: 1997–2008. Viz Media. ISBN 978-1-4215-6090-8.
- Morgenstern, Joel (10 June 2005). "Married, With Howitzers: 'Mr. and Mrs. Smith' Battle, Slaying Nuance and Humor". The Wall Street Journal.
- Napier, Susan J. (2018). Miyazakiworld: A Life in Art. Yale University Press. ISBN 978-0-300-22685-0.
- "Hauru no Ugoku Shiro – Frequently asked questions". Nausicaa.net.
- "Hauru no Ugoku Shiro – Credits". Nausicaa.net.
- "Hauru no Ugoku Shiro – CD guide". Nausicaa.net.
- "Readers choose their top movies of the 21st century". The New York Times.
- 均, 中村 (23 May 2007). "110万冊無料配布。"ゲドを読む。"の狙いを読む 宮崎吾朗監督作品「ゲド戦記」DVDのユニークなプロモーション". Nikkei Business (in Japanese). Nikkei Business Publications. Archived from the original on 16 August 2018.
- "Hauru no ugoku shiro (2005) - Financial Information". The Numbers. Archived from the original on 16 August 2018.
- Odell, Colin; Le Blanc, Michelle (2009). Studio Ghibli: The Films of Hayao Miyazaki and Isao Takahata. Kamera. ISBN 978-1-84243-279-2.
- "The 78th Academy Awards (2006) Nominees and Winners". Oscars.org.
- Parsons, Elizabeth (19 October 2007). "Animating Grandma: the indices of age and agency in contemporary children's films" (PDF). Journal of Aging, Humanities, and the Arts. 1 (3–4): 221–229. doi:10.1080/19325610701638243. hdl:10536/DRO/DU:30007845. Archived from the original (PDF) on 10 December 2020.
- Pearce, Steven (13 July 2026). "Hauru no Ugoku Shiro". In Clute, John; Langford, David (eds.). The Encyclopedia of Science Fiction (4th ed.). ISSN 3049-7612. Archived from the original on 12 November 2026.
- Puig, Claudia (9 June 2005). "'Howl's Moving Castle' enchants". USA Today.
- "Howl's Moving Castle Movie Reviews". Rotten Tomatoes. Fandango.
- Rooney, David (8 September 2004). "Review: 'Howl's Moving Castle'". Variety.com. Archived from the original on 5 March 2018.
- "Studio Ghibli Diary". Translated by Schnell, Philip. Nausicaa.net.
- Scott, A. O. (July 2005a). "Where the Wild Things Are: The Miyazaki Menagerie" (PDF). The Asia-Pacific Journal. 3 (7).
- Scott, A. O. (10 June 2005b). "A Cursed Teenager Turns 90. Let the Adventures Begin". The New York Times.
- Shilling, Mark (17 December 2002). "New Hayao Miyazaki film heads Toho line-up". ScreenDaily. Archived from the original on 17 August 2003.
- Smalley, Gregory J. (30 May 2019). "A Look Back at Miyazaki's Steampunk Classic "Howl's Moving Castle"". The Spool.
- Smith, Lindsay (1 April 2011). "War, Wizards, and Words: Transformative Adaptation and Transformed Meanings in Howl's Moving Castle" (PDF). The Projector Film and Media Journal. 11 (1). Archived from the original (PDF) on 2 January 2014.
- Talbot, Margaret (March 2006). "The Auteur of Anime". The Asia-Pacific Journal. 4 (3).
- Tingley, Anna (1 February 2023). "Studio Ghibli and Luxury Fashion House Loewe Team Up for One Final Collaboration". Variety. Archived from the original on 31 March 2023.
- Travers, Peter (9 June 2005). "Howl's Moving Castle". Rolling Stone.
- Trout, Jonathan (13 September 2005). "Howl's Moving Castle". BBC.
- Wilson, Carl; Wilson, Garrath T. (2015). "Taoism, Shintoism, and the ethics of technology: an ecocritical review of Howl's Moving Castle" (PDF). Resilience: A Journal of the Environmental Humanities. 2 (3): 189–194. doi:10.5250/resilience.2.3.0189. S2CID 191753828.
- Zacharek, Stephanie (10 June 2005). "Howl's Moving Castle". Salon. Archived from the original on 14 August 2016.
