= Pilot film of Royal Space Force: The Wings of Honnêamise =

Pilot film version of the 1987 anime film

The very first anime work produced by Gainax following their incorporation as a company in December 1984 was a four-minute "pilot film" version of their concept for an original anime project to be entitled Royal Space Force. The project had been initially pitched to Bandai in September of that year by Hiroyuki Yamaga and Toshio Okada, then associated with Daicon Film, an amateur film group, many of whose staff would shortly join the new professional studio Gainax. Hesitation by Bandai to enter the film business required Gainax to first make the "pilot film" of Royal Space Force as a demo to determine if the project would be saleable. Shigeru Watanabe, an early supporter of the plan at Bandai who would later become co-planner of the feature-length 1987 version of Royal Space Force, showed the pilot film to both Mamoru Oshii and Hayao Miyazaki, already established as successful anime directors, to seek their views; both expressed support for the project.

Yamaga would later assess the pilot film as "Ghiblish" and felt that it had been "unconsciously" created under a consensus by its animators that Miyazaki's style was a model to emulate in order to make a hit anime film. Although Gainax was given provisional approval by Bandai to begin work on a feature film version of Royal Space Force after screening the pilot, Yamaga would then decide to "destroy" the world created for the pilot film in making the full-length version, believing that while it presented a fascinating world, it did not convey the alternate sense of reality that was his conceptual goal as director. Yamaga considered that the actual film would have been "easier to grasp and express" had Gainax in fact modeled it on the pilot; however he argued also that his decision to change course and not attempt to emulate Miyazaki laid the groundwork for Gainax's creative independence that would, in their later works, lead to success on their own terms.

== Pilot film ==
This was a project that made full use of all sorts of wiles. At the time, Hayao Miyazaki said, "Bandai was fooled by Okada's proposal." I was the first person at Bandai to be fooled (laughs). But no, that's not the case. I'm a simple person; I just wanted to try it because it looked interesting. Nobody thought that Bandai could make an original movie. There wasn't any know-how at all. But that's why I found it interesting. No, to be honest, there were moments when I thought, "I can't do this." But [Gainax]'s president, Okada, and the director, Yamaga, both thought strongly, "I want to make anime professionally, and speak to the world." Producer Hiroaki Inoue felt the same way, as did [Yasuhiro] Takeda ... I was about the same age, so I got into the flow of all those people's enthusiasm." —Shigeru Watanabe, 2004 (Note: The term Watanabe used for "wiles," teren-tekuda (手練手管), is a traditional yojijukugo (four-character phrase) with overtones of seduction, coaxing, and guile. In his 2002 memoir, Takeda notes that both Watanabe and he were born in 1957, "and the two of us have gone out drinking together many times... He is also the one who arranged for Bandai to help fund the production of our first theatrical anime release. If it hadn't been for him, Okada and Yamaga's dream of producing a feature length motion picture might never have been realized.")

=== First studio and new staff ===
Royal Space Force was initially planned as a 40-minute long OVA project, with a budget variously reported at 20 or 40 million yen; however, resistance elsewhere within Bandai to entering the filmmaking business resulted in the requirement that Gainax first submit a short "pilot film" version of Royal Space Force as a demo to determine if the project would be saleable. Work on the pilot film began in December 1984 as Yamaga and Okada moved from Osaka to Tokyo to set up Gainax's first studio in a rented space in the Takadanobaba neighborhood of Shinjuku. That same month, Gainax was officially registered as a corporation in Sakai City, Osaka; founding Gainax board member Yasuhiro Takeda has remarked that the original plan was to disband Gainax as soon as Royal Space Force was completed; it was intended at first only as a temporary corporate entity needed to hold production funds from Bandai during the making of the anime.

The Royal Space Force pilot film was made by the same principal staff of Yamaga, Okada, Sadamoto, Anno, and Sonoda listed in the initial proposal, with the addition of Maeda as main personnel on layouts and settei; Sadamoto, Maeda, and Anno served as well among a crew of ten key animators that included Hiroyuki Kitakubo, Yuji Moriyama, Fumio Iida, and Masayuki. A further addition to the staff was co-producer Hiroaki Inoue, recruited as a founding member of Gainax by Okada. Inoue was active in the same Kansai-area science fiction fandom associated with Daicon Film, but had already been in the anime industry for several years, beginning at Tezuka Productions. Takeda noted that while a number of the other Royal Space Force personnel had worked on professional anime projects, none possessed Inoue's supervisory experience, or the contacts he had built in the process. Inoue would leave Gainax after their 1988–1989 Gunbuster, but continued in the industry and would later co-produce Satoshi Kon's 1997 debut film Perfect Blue.

=== Support from Oshii and Miyazaki ===
In a 2004 interview, Shigeru Watanabe, by then a senior managing director and former president of Bandai Visual, who in later years had co-produced such films as Mamoru Oshii's Ghost in the Shell and Hiroyuki Okiura's Jin-Roh, reflected on his personal maneuvers to get Royal Space Force green-lit by Bandai's executive board, showing the pilot film to various people both inside and outside the company, including soliciting the views of Oshii and Miyazaki. In a 1996 appearance at the San Jose convention Anime America, Toshio Okada remarked to a panel audience that Watanabe "believes in Mamoru Oshii, just like Jesus Christ" and that Oshii's expression of interest in Royal Space Force served as a powerful motivation for Watanabe to work to get the film green-lit, although Okada joked that by the present day Watanabe had "come out of his brainwashing" and that "maybe, Mr. Oshii is sometimes wrong."

As Bandai was already in the home video business, Watanabe reasoned that the strong video sales of Nausicaä of the Valley of the Wind, released the previous year, meant that Miyazaki's opinions would hold weight with Bandai's executives. Watanabe visited Miyazaki's then-studio Nibariki alone and spoke with the director for three hours, of which time, Watanabe joked, he got to speak for ten minutes. Miyazaki, who had worked with Hideaki Anno on Nausicaä, told him, "Anno and his friends are amateurs, but I think they're a little different," comparing the matter to amateurs having "a gorgeous bay window" versus having a foundation: "They feel like they can make the foundation, and maybe raise a new building. If necessary, you can give that advice to the Bandai board." Watanabe laughed that when he told the executives what Miyazaki had said, they approved the project.

=== Pitching a "Ghiblish" pilot film ===
In April 1985, Okada and Yamaga formally presented the finished pilot film to a board meeting at Bandai, together with a new set of concept paintings by Sadamoto. The four-minute pilot film began with a 40-second prelude sequence of still shots of Shirotsugh's early life accompanied by audio in Russian depicting a troubled Soviet space mission, followed by a shot of a rocket booster stage separating animated by Anno, leading into the main portion of the pilot, which depicts the story's basic narrative through a progression of animated scenes without dialogue or sound effects, set to the overture of Wagner's Die Meistersinger von Nürnberg. Okada addressed the board with a speech described as impassioned, speaking for an hour on Gainax's analysis of the anime industry, future market trends, and the desire of the young for "a work called Royal Space Force". Bandai gave interim approval to Royal Space Force as their company's first independent video production; however, the decision to make the project as a theatrical film would be subject to review at the end of 1985, once Gainax had produced a complete storyboard and settei.

In a 2005 column for the online magazine Anime Style, editor and scriptwriter Yuichiro Oguro recalled seeing a video copy of the pilot film secretly circulating after its completion around the anime industry, where there was interest based on Sadamoto and Maeda's reputations as "the genius boys of Tokyo Zokei University". Oguro noted as differences from the later finished movie the pilot film's younger appearance of Shirotsugh and more bishōjo style of Riquinni, whose behavior in the pilot put him in mind of a Miyazaki heroine, as did the composition of the film itself. Yamaga, in a 2007 interview for the Blu-ray/DVD edition release, confirmed this impression about the pilot film and speculated on its consequences:

It's clearly different from the complete version, and by using the modern saying, it's very Ghiblish ... Among the ambitious animators of those days, there was some sort of consensus that "if we can create an animated movie that adults can watch, with decent content 'for children' which director Hayao Miyazaki has, it will be a hit for sure." The pilot version was also created under that consensus unconsciously. However, I figured it's not good to do so, and my movie making started from completely denying that consensus. Of course, if we had created this movie with the concept of the world similar to the pilot version, it would've had a balanced and stable style, and not only for staff, but also for sponsors, motion picture companies, and the media ... it would have been easier to grasp and express. But if we had done that, I don't think that any of the Gainax works after that would've been successful at all.

== General and cited references ==
- Clements, Jonathan (2013). Anime: A History. London: Palgrave Macmillan. ISBN 978-1-84457-390-5.
- Hotta, Junji [in Japanese] (2005b) [interview conducted in February 2004]. "Shigeru Watanabe". Gainax Interviews. Tokyo: Kodansha. ISBN 4-06-364643-2.
- Matsushita, Kazumi, ed. (1987). Ōritsu Uchūgun Seisaku Kirokushū [Royal Space Force Production Archives]. Tokyo: Movic. ISBN 978-4943966074.
- Oguro, Yuichiro [in Japanese] (October 4, 2005). "Anime-sama 365-nichi dai 340-kai Ōritsu Uchūgun Pairottofirumu [365 Days of Anime #340: Ōritsu Uchūgun Pilot Film]". Anime Style. Studio Male.
- Osmond, Andrew (2009). Satoshi Kon: The Illusionist. Berkeley: Stone Bridge Press. ISBN 978-1-933330-74-7.
- Studio Hard [in Japanese], ed. (1987). Oneamisu no Tsubasa: Ōritsu Uchūgun Completed File. Tokyo: Bandai. ISBN 4-89189-377-X.
- Takeda, Yasuhiro (2005) [First published in Japan by Wani Books in 2002]. The Notenki Memoirs: Studio Gainax and the Men Who Created Evangelion. Houston: ADV Manga. ISBN 1-4139-0234-0.
- Thompson, Jason, ed. (1996). "Return of the Otaking: Toshio Okada at Anime America '96". j-pop.com. San Francisco: Viz Communications, Inc. Archived from the original on January 26, 2000.
- Watanabe, Shigeru [in Japanese], ed. (1990). Ōritsu Uchūgun Oneamisu no Tsubasa Memorial Box (A Wing of Honnëamise Royal Space Force Data File [liner notes]) (LaserDisc). Tokyo: Bandai Visual.
- Yamaga, Hiroyuki (2007). "I Started from Utterly Breaking the 'Concept of Anime' That Was Within the Staff's Heads.". Royal Space Force: The Wings of Honnêamise (liner notes) (Blu-ray/DVD liner notes). Torrance: Bandai Visual Co., Ltd. ASIN B001EX9YSQ.
