= Ricerche di Pedagogia e Didattica =

- Discipline: Education
- Language: Italian, English

Publication details
- History: 2006-present
- Publisher: University of Bologna (Italy)
- Frequency: Biannual
- Open access: Yes
- License: Creative Commons Attribution Non Commercial Non Derivatives 3.0 Unported License

Standard abbreviations
- ISO 4: Ric. Pedagog. Didatt.

Indexing
- ISSN: 1970-2221
- OCLC no.: 644366029

Links
- Journal homepage; Online access; Online archive

Ricerche di Pedagogia e Didattica: Journal of Theories and Research in Education is a peer-reviewed open access academic journal established in 2006. It is published by the Department of Education science of the University of Bologna. It covers education theories and pedagogy. The journal is published in Italian and English.

In 2012, the journal acquired class A status in the evaluation lists published by the "National Agency for the Evaluation of Universities and Research Institutes", and it is indexed in several databases (as SUMMONS) and academic search engines

It is maintained by AlmaDL, digital library of the University of Bologna.
