= Raz Greenberg =

Israeli animation scholar

- רז גרינברג
- Education: Hebrew University of Jerusalem
- Occupations: Animation scholar, Writer
- Writing career
- Notable work: Hayao Miyazaki: Exploring the Early Work of Japan's Greatest Animator

Raz Greenberg (Hebrew: רז גרינברג) is an Israeli animation scholar and writer.

== Biography ==
Greenberg received his Doctor of Philosophy degree from the Hebrew University of Jerusalem in 2014, and has worked at the institution as a teaching fellow. He has published articles in various animation journals such as the Literature Film Quarterly. Greenberg is an adjunct lecturer at Tel Aviv University in the Department of East Asian Studies.

== Reception ==
In a review for Strange Horizons, writer A. S. Moser critiqued Greenberg's 2018 reference work Hayao Miyazaki: Exploring the Early Work of Japan's Greatest Animator. Moser appreciated the detailed analysis given to Hayao Miyazaki's filmography, but felt that the book lacked balance in its attempts to be a broader reference work, concluding that it was "well-researched, if sometimes tedious". International Institute for Asian Studies reviewer Mari Nakamura called the work a "must-read" for follower's of Miyazaki's, considering it accessible for a wider audience while also providing elaborate commentary on the main aspects of his films, such as Miyazaki's inspirations and stylistic influences. British animation writer Helen McCarthy found the work "charming, thorough, and accessible", and felt that Greenberg places Miyazaki's filmography within the wider cultural context of his early animations.
