= Michelle Le Blanc and Colin Odell =

Film critics and writing duo

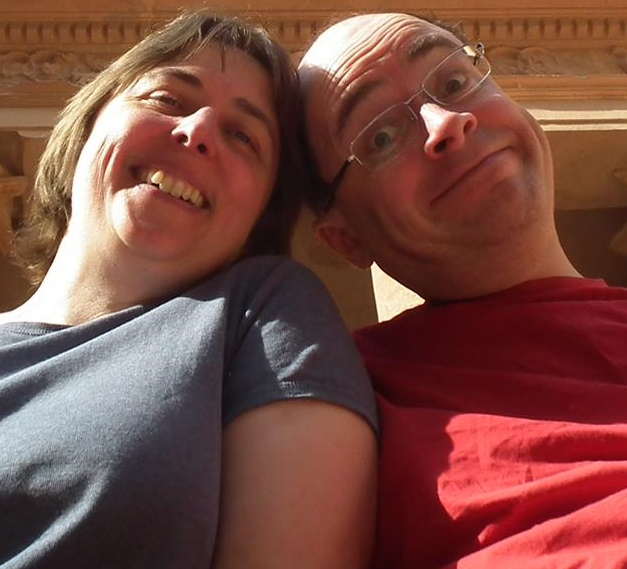
Michelle Le Blanc and Colin Odell (pictured in 2016)

Michelle Le Blanc and Colin Odell are film critics and writers.

== Biography ==
Le Blanc and Odell are a married writing duo based in the United Kingdom. They first met at university. The two have been writing for Kamera Books's website since 2001, and have also contributed to The Greenwood Encyclopedia of Science Fiction and Fantasy (2005).

The two wrote a book covering the filmography of the director David Lynch in 2008. In Film-Philosophy, the film scholar Liani van Straaten commended the book's structure and writing style for its approachability, but felt that it lacked the depth needed to be an academic study. Stephen Rees of Library Journal felt Le Blanc and Odell managed to find new critical angles on Lynch's work, but wrote it was "not the ultimate book" on the subject.

In 2009, the duo published the reference work Studio Ghibli: The Films of Hayao Miyazaki and Isao Takahata. They spent several months researching for the book and travelled to Japan, where they visited the Ghibli Museum and watched Ponyo (2008) before its Western release. Library Journal's Terry Hong called the book "an excellent overview" of Studio Ghibli, and Film Ireland's Michiko Yamada wrote it was "a must-have handbook for the Ghibli lover".

The two wrote a book analysing Akira (1988) in 2014. Paul Kincaid reviewed the book in the Journal of the Fantastic in the Arts alongside several others published by the British Film Institute as part of its "Film Classics" series, and found it to be "useful and accessible". Reviewing for Extrapolation, Steven Holmes wrote that the book could have further explored the manga (1982–1990) and the film's social contexts.

== Selected bibliography ==
- ———; ——— (2007). David Lynch. Kamera Books. ISBN 978-1-8424-3225-9.
- ———; ——— (2009). Studio Ghibli: The Films of Hayao Miyazaki and Isao Takahata. Kamera Books. ISBN 978-1-84243-279-2.
- ———; ——— (2014). Akira. British Film Institute. ISBN 978-1-84457-808-5.
