= AnimeClick.it =

Italian-language anime and manga website

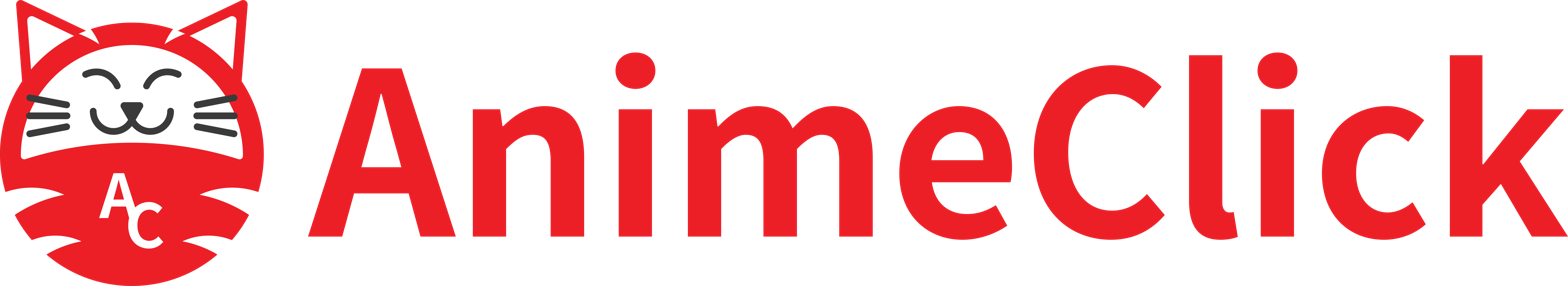
- Website type: Anime and manga social networking and cataloging
- Available in: Italian
- Founded: 1998
- Owner: Associazione culturale New Type Media ETS
- Creator: Andrea Sartori
- Key people: Alessandro « Ironic74 » Falciatore (Editor-in-Chief)
- Website: https://www.animeclick.it/
- Commercial: No
- Registration: Optional

AnimeClick.it is an Italian web portal that provides daily news and a database about anime and manga. The website, often regarded as the most important in that field in Italy, also provides related information such as trivia about the Japanese culture, videogames and fansubs in Italian.

== History ==
AnimeClick.it is an amateur site founded at the end of 1998 as a side branch of a local web portal called VeronaClick. It has published its first news on October 4, 1999.

On May 31, 2011, the editorial staff of AnimeClick.it came together at the no-profit cultural association Associazione NewType Media. On the same day, the founder of the site, Andrea Sartori, entrusted the management of the portal to said association.

In the Autumn of the same year, AnimeClick.it was involved by manga and anime publisher Dynit in the casting of the main voice actors for the Italian official release of Puella Magi Madoka Magica, through a survey among the users of the site. Following this, the site expanded its offer, giving more coverage to live-action productions, j-pop and k-pop, and to the phenomenon of Italian fansubs.

In October, 2011, AnimeClick.it released on the Android Market an app that offers some of the site's services. Since 2011, the site also started to have its own official stand and official collaborations with various Italian comics and games conventions such as Lucca Comics & Games, Napoli Comicon, Cartoomics, Etna Comics, Romics, Udine's Far East Film Festival, becoming the official Media Partner of some of them.

In 2015, the site became a network with the opening of two other web portals: SerialClick.it, about TV series and live actions, in January (then closed in 2019) and GamerClick.it, a portal about videogames, in June.

In 2018, during the Lucca Comics & Games convention, AnimeClick.it held the first edition of the AnimeClick Awards. In 2021, the site became an official Streaming Media Partner of Lucca Comics & Games and kept the role since.

In October 2023, the publishing house Rizzoli published the book La super guida manga, curated by the editorial staff of the site.
