= Dani Cavallaro =

British freelance writer (born 1962)

Dani Cavallaro (born 1962) is a British freelance writer, who specializes in literary, cultural theory, and visual arts topics.

== Academic responses ==
In his review of Magic as Metaphor in Anime, Christopher Feldman of the University of Texas at Austin criticised Cavallaro's use of "cliché, repetitive phrasing", which he felt may be useful for general audiences, but not for readers seeking a "rigorous work". Buckinghamshire New University's Mark Bould further criticised Cavallaro's writing in a review of Cyberpunk and Cyberculture, calling it "disturbingly dishonest". Bould felt that the work often simply summarises the analysis done by other critics, and draws analogies without presenting an analytical argument, demonstrating Cavallaro's ignorance of the cyberpunk genre. While a review of the same work by David Finkelstein of Queen Margaret University praises the breadth of Cavallaro's discussion of William Gibson's work, it also noted the "amorphous" and "dilute" critique, which Finkelstein felt did not provide enough context to each work.

Yoshiko Okuyama of the University of Hawaii at Hilo reviewed Fairy Tale and Anime as an "excellent read" for scholars interested in the subjects, but noted that the book often used Japanese terminology without adequate explanation. Lancaster University's Alison Fell felt that French Feminist Theory was "a book to be recommended", but also that the density of technical prose was a barrier to introductory readers.

== Selected works ==
- ——— (2000). Cyberpunk and Cyberculture: Science Fiction and the Work of William Gibson. Bloomsbury Publishing. ISBN 978-0-4850-0607-0.
- ——— (2006). The Anime Art of Hayao Miyazaki. McFarland & Company. ISBN 978-0-7864-2369-9.
- ——— (2007). French Feminist Theory: An Introduction. Bloomsbury Publishing. ISBN 978-0-8264-9245-6.
- ——— (2007). Anime Intersections: Tradition and Innovation in Theme and Technique. McFarland & Company. ISBN 978-0-7864-3234-9.
- ——— (2009). Anime and Memory: Aesthetic, Cultural and Thematic Perspectives. McFarland & Company. ISBN 978-0-7864-4112-9.
- ——— (2013). Japanese Aesthetics and Anime: The Influence of Tradition. McFarland & Company. ISBN 978-0-7864-7151-5.
- ——— (2013). Synesthesia and the Arts. McFarland & Company. ISBN 978-0-7864-7563-6.
