= Third Éditions =

French publishing house

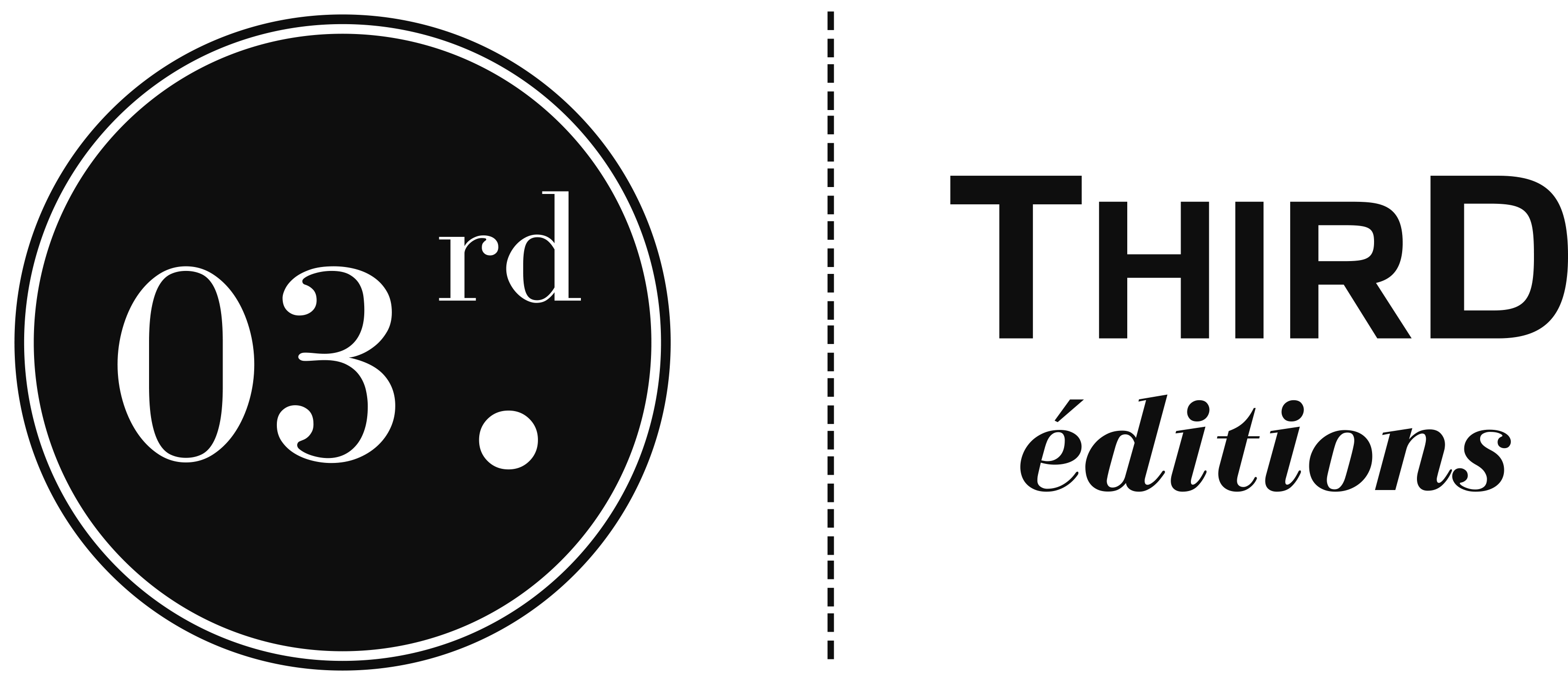
- Status: Active
- Founded: 2015
- Founder: Mehdi El Kanafi and Nicolas Courcier
- Headquarters location: Toulouse, France
- Distribution: SCB Distributors
- Publication types: Video Games Books
- Imprints: The Legend of Final Fantasy VII
- Official website: https://www.thirdeditions.com/en/

Third Éditions is a French publishing house dedicated to video games, founded in 2015 by Mehdi El Kanafi and Nicolas Courcier. Together, in 2010, they already founded the publishing house Console Syndrome, which was then bought by Pix’n Love Éditions. During the four years they worked with Pix’n Love, Mehdi and Nicolas published and often co-wrote many video game essays, such as Zelda: The History of a Legendary Saga, The Legend of Final Fantasy VII and Metal Gear Solid: Hideo Kojima’s Magnum Opus. Since 2015, with their new publishing house, Third Éditions, they pursue their editorial approach: to analyze the greatest series in video game history. Thanks to two successful Kickstarter campaigns, they’ve now reached the international market with English translations of their books.

== History ==
Born in 1984, Mehdi El Kanafi and Nicolas Courcier both grew up in Muret, near Toulouse (France). They tell their story in The Third, the annual Third Éditions’s newspaper. While they often crossed each other on a basketball court, their true journey started in middle school. They recount the years spent discussing about their new common interest: video games.

Once we were free from our studies, we founded our own company in 2010, say the two partners, who managed to seduce some big companies such as Ubisoft. Their first company was bought by Pix’n Love, and then they stood on their own two feet starting from 2014.

In three years only, Third Éditions became a major publishing house dedicated to video games and pop culture in France. Some books, such as Zelda. The History of a Legendary Saga, have sold more than 30,000 copies.

Third Editions’s editorial line is defined that way: Every book is written under three major perspectives: genesis, background, and analysis. The goal is to take a major franchise or game, and professionally strip it down to the core. Going from the gameplay analysis to the lore explanation or even how the sound was intended to work on the player.

Thanks to their first Kickstarter campaign in 2016, which successfully collected €139,296, Third Éditions managed to translate several books in English. Another successful Kickstarter campaign in 2018 allowed them to translate more books from their list.

== Books ==
- The Legend of Final Fantasy VI (by Pierre Maugein), 2018
- The Legend of Final Fantasy VII (by Mehdi El Kanafi and Nicolas Courcier), 2017
- Dark Souls. Beyond the Grave - Volume 1 (by Damien Mecheri and Sylvain Romieu), 2017
- Zelda. The History Of A Legendary Saga. (by Mehdi El Kanafi and Nicolas Courcier), 2017
- Metal Gear Solid. Hideo Kojima's Magnum Opus (by Mehdi El Kanafi, Nicolas Courcier and Denis Brusseaux), 2018
- BioShock. From Rapture to Columbia (by Mehdi El Kanafi, Nicolas Courcier and Raphaël Lucas), 2018

== Interviews ==
- on Nintendojo, 26 March 2018
