= International Institute for Asian Studies =

Dutch research institute

International Institute for Asian Studies (IIAS)
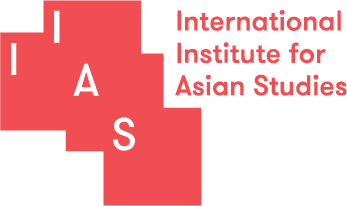
- Motto: Promoting critical, humanistic, and collaborative work on, with, in, and beyond Asia
- Established: 1993
- Director: Philippe Peycam (2009 - Present); Prof. Max Sparreboom (2006-2009); Prof. Wim Stokhof (1993-2006)
- Location: Leiden, Netherlands
- Website: www.iias.asia

The International Institute for Asian Studies (IIAS) is a global research institute and knowledge exchange platform, based in Leiden, the Netherlands. The Institute initiates and promotes multidisciplinary as well as inter- and trans-regional initiatives that engage institutional partners and knowledge communities in Asia, Africa, Europe, the Americas, and beyond.

Across multiple platforms and programmes, the IIAS promotes critical, humanistic, and collaborative work on, with, in, and beyond Asia. In so doing, the Institute promotes a more integrated understanding of present-day Asian realities, pioneers new approaches to Asian Studies in a changing global context, and contributes to new humanistically-informed and policy-relevant knowledge about Asia.

== Establishment ==
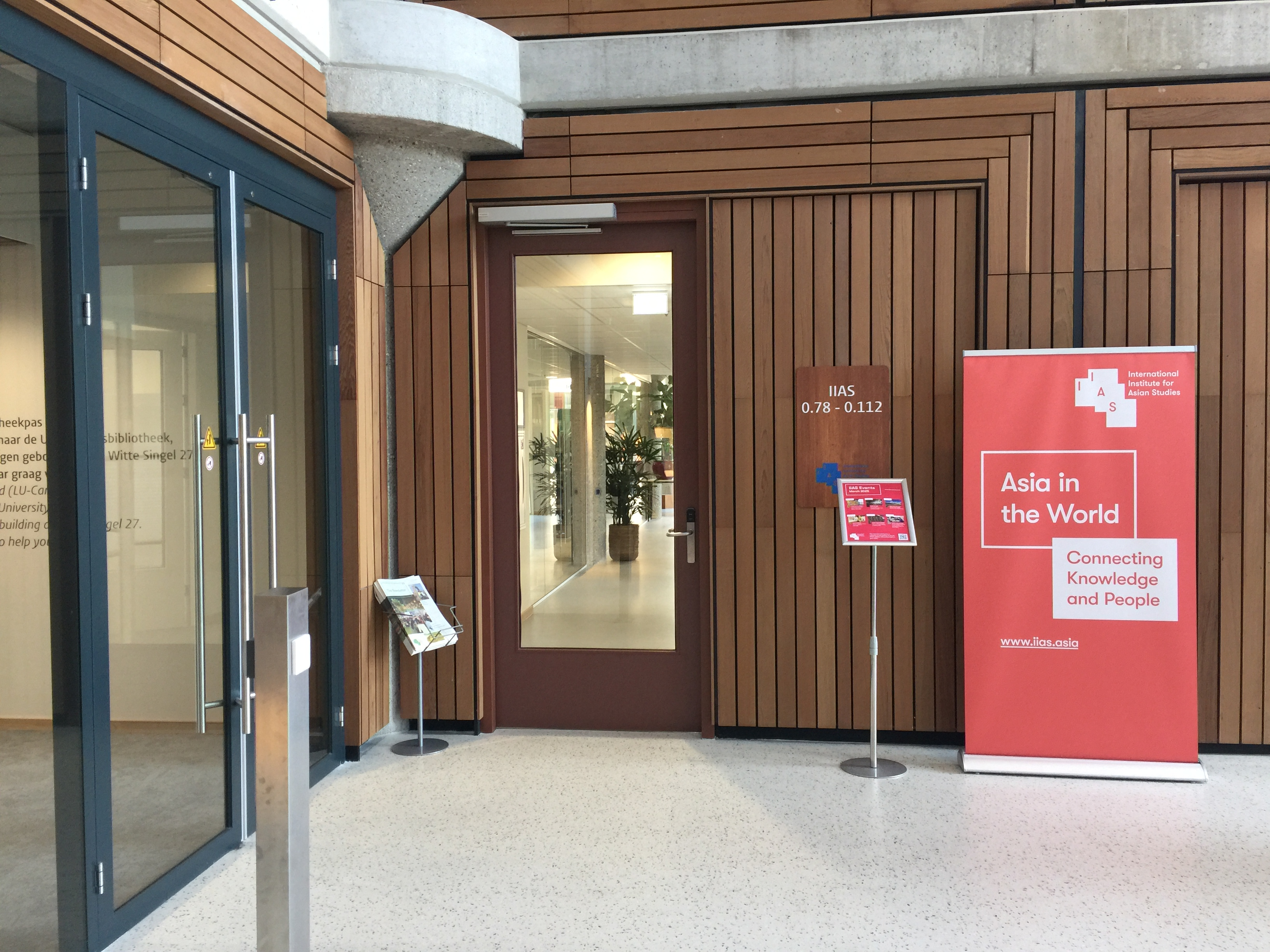
IIAS Leiden, entrance (2025)

The IIAS was established in 1993, following recommendations by two successive committees, installed by the Ministry of Education, Culture and Science (Netherlands) (1989) and the Royal Netherlands Academy of Arts and Sciences. Headquartered in Leiden, IIAS was conceived as a national consortium-based collaboration between KNAW, Leiden University, Vrije Universiteit Amsterdam, and the University of Amsterdam. From 1997 to 2012, the institute also maintained a branch office at the UvA in Amsterdam. Since 2012, IIAS has been hosted exclusively by Leiden University, with funding from the Dutch Ministry of Education, Culture and Science. In addition, the institute receives generous support from a range of distinguished foundations and institutions, including the Andrew W. Mellon Foundation, the Henry Luce Foundation, the Japan Foundation, among others.

Founded to position the Netherlands as a hub for engaging with Asia’s rising global prominence, IIAS has fostered interdisciplinary research on Asia. With a global perspective, the institute has promoted national and international collaboration, advancing Asian Studies in a multicentered world, including expanding its reach to Africa and South America in recent years.

== Fellowships ==
The IIAS Fellowship Programme is one of the longest-running programs of its kind, with over 1000 alumni, including numerous leading figures in Asian Studies worldwide, such as Professor Kamran Asdar Ali and Henk Blezer. Granted annually on a competitive basis, IIAS Fellowships include financial, residential, and networking support to diverse recipients.

Enabling scholars to pursue a wide array of topical interests, the program provides fellows flexibility, space, and time to work on projects advancing IIAS’s core thematic priorities. In collaboration with the Gonda Foundation and with the support of the Royal Netherlands Academy of Arts and Sciences (KNAW), IIAS also actively promotes the scholarly study of Sanskrit, other classical Indian languages and literatures, as well as Indian cultural history. Each year, the Institute welcomes fellows through the Gonda Fellowship Programme, fostering exchange in these fields.

In addition, IIAS is home to the Chair of Taiwan Studies at Leiden University, further expanding its interdisciplinary focus and global engagement.

== Knowledge Sharing ==
The institute is widely recognized through its flagship publication The Newsletter. Free in both its print and online editions, The Newsletter reaches over 50,000 readers worldwide and anchors other digital platforms such as The Channel podcast and The IIAS Blog. The institute also publishes four book series in collaboration with Amsterdam University Press.

Through its Humanities Across Borders programme, IIAS develops and promotes innovative pedagogy, bridging civil society, practitioners and higher education institutions. The institute is also known for its contributions to urban and environmental projects, having launched several influential collaborative initiatives including the River Cities Network (RCN), the Southeast Asia Neighborhoods Network (SEANNET) and the Urban Knowledge Network Asia (UKNA).

While upholding its original mission, over the years the Institute has adapted and expanded its programmatic agenda in response to the demands of a changing global context.

== Activities & ICAS ==
- Activities include multi-year research programs and the building of academic networks, the organization of international conferences and roundtables, a fellowship and a publication program, In-Situ Graduate Schools, and the publication of a free periodical on Asian Studies (IIAS Newsletter).
- IIAS has twice organised ICAS, the International Convention of Asia Scholars (ICAS) in Leiden, namely the 1st and 11th edition, in resp. 1998 and 2019.
