= Rayna Denison =

British film scholar

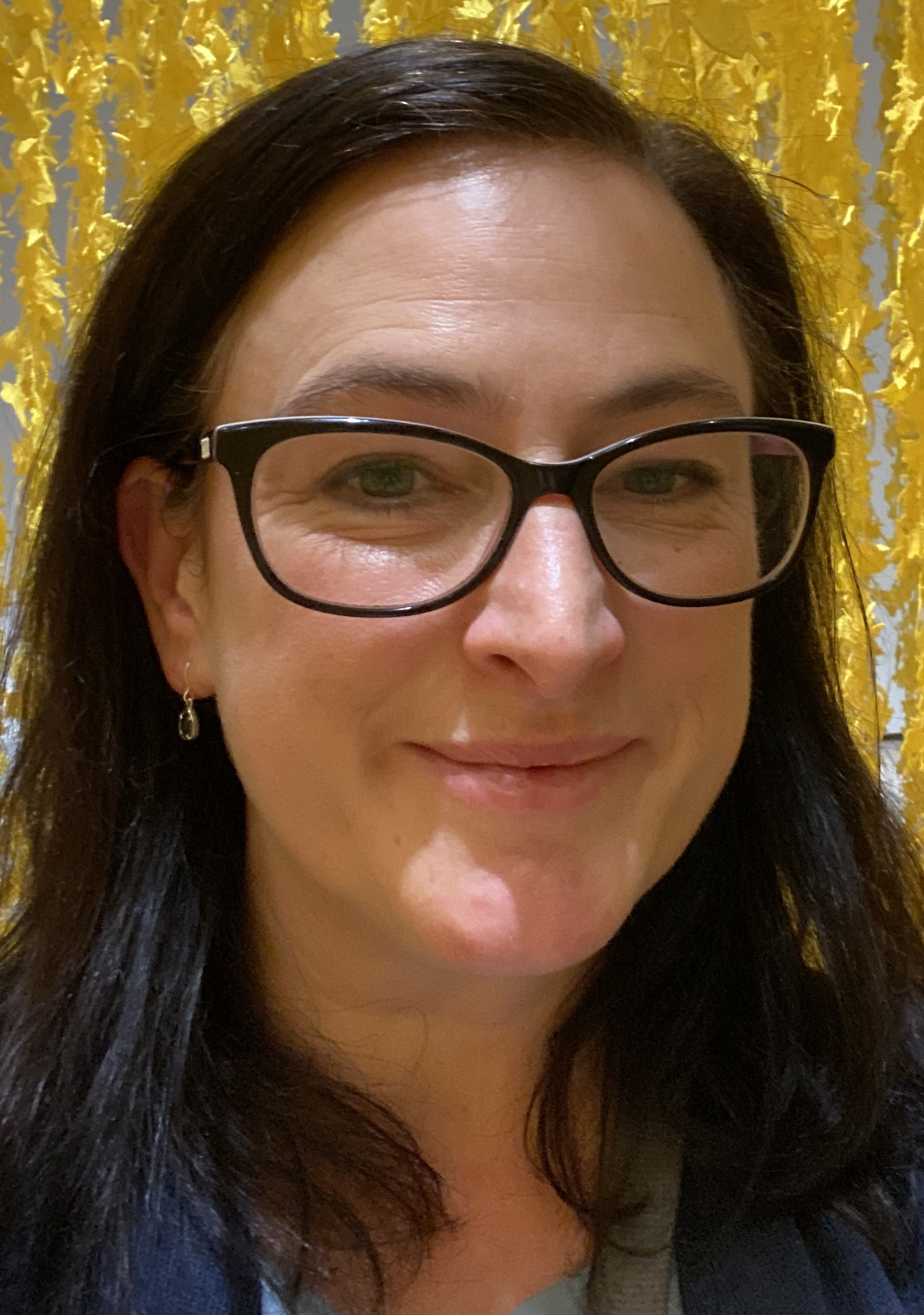
- Denison in 2024
- Education: University of Nottingham
- Occupations: Film and arts scholar
- Writing career
- Notable works: Anime: A Critical Introduction; Studio Ghibli: An Industrial History

Rayna Denison is a British film and arts scholar.

== Biography ==
Denison pursued Japanese studies at the University of Oxford, continuing to the University of Nottingham to attain her Master of Arts and Doctor of Philosophy degrees. She has previously taught as a senior lecturer at the University of East Anglia. Denison is a professor and the head of the department of film and television at the University of Bristol. She co-edited the collection Superheroes on World Screens, which was nominated for an Eisner Award for Best Academic/Scholarly Work in 2016.

== Selected bibliography ==
=== Books ===
- ——— (2015). Anime: A Critical Introduction. Bloomsbury Publishing. ISBN 978-1-4725-7681-1.
- ———; Mizsei-Ward, Rachel, eds. (2015). Superheroes on World Screens. University Press of Mississippi. ISBN 978-1-6284-6234-0.
- ———, ed. (2018). Princess Mononoke: Understanding Studio Ghibli's Monster Princess. Bloomsbury Academic. ISBN 978-1-5013-2976-0.
- ——— (2023). Studio Ghibli: An Industrial History. Palgrave Macmillan. ISBN 978-3-031-16843-7.
- Coleman, Lindsay; ———; Desser, David, eds. (2025). The Many Worlds of Takahata Isao. University of Hawaiʻi Press. ISBN 979-8-8807-0104-9.

==== Chapters ====
- ——— (2007). "The Global Markets for Japanese Film: Transforming Miyazaki Hayao's Sen to Chihiro no Kamikakushi into Spirited Away". In Phillips, Alastair; Stringer, Julian (eds.). Japanese Cinema: Texts and Contexts. London: Routledge. pp. 308–321. ISBN 978-0-4153-2848-7.
- ——— (2008). "The Language of the Blockbuster: Marketing, Princess Mononoke and the Daihitto in Japanese Film Culture". In Hunt, Leon; Wing-Fai, Leung (eds.). East Asian Cinemas: Transnational Connections on Film. I.B. Tauris. pp. 103–122. ISBN 978-1-8451-1614-9.
- ——— (January 2017). "Anime's Star Voices: Voice Actor (Seiyū) Performance and Stardom in Japan". In Whittaker, Tom; Wright, Sarah (eds.). Locating the Voice in Film: Critical Approaches and Global Practices. pp. 101–118. doi:10.1093/acprof:oso/9780190261122.003.0007. ISBN 978-0-1902-6115-3.

=== Journal articles ===
- ——— (November 2005). "Disembodied stars and the cultural meanings of Princess Mononoke's soundscape" (PDF). Scope (3). ISSN 1465-9166. Archived (PDF) from the original on 8 March 2024.
- ——— (July 2008). "Star-Spangled Ghibli: Star Voices in the American Versions of Miyazaki Hayao's Films". Animation. 3 (2): 129–146. doi:10.1177/1746847708091891.
- ——— (15 December 2010). "Anime tourism: discursive construction and reception of the Studio Ghibli Art Museum". Japan Forum. 22 (3–4): 545–563. doi:10.1080/09555803.2010.533475.
- ——— (September 2011). "Anime fandom and the liminal spaces between fan creativity and piracy". International Journal of Cultural Studies. 14 (5): 449–466. doi:10.1177/1367877910394565.
- ——— (2014). "Franchising and Failure: Discourses of Failure within the Japanese-American Speed Racer Franchise". Mechademia. 9: 269–281. doi:10.1353/mec.2014.0011.
- ———; Furukawa, Hiroko (21 November 2014). "Disaster and relief: The 3.11 Tohoku and Fukushima disasters and Japan's media industries". International Journal of Cultural Studies. 18 (2). doi:10.1177/136787791455930 (inactive 1 July 2025).
- ——— (Winter 2016). "Franchising and Film in Japan: Transmedia Production and the Changing Roles of Film in Contemporary Japanese Media Cultures" (DOC). Cinema Journal. 55 (2): 67–88. doi:10.1353/cj.2016.0006. ISSN 2578-4919.
- ——— (1 April 2018). "Before Ghibli was Ghibli: Analysing the Historical Discourses Surrounding Hayao Miyazaki's Castle in the Sky (1986)" (PDF). East Asian Journal of Popular Culture. 4 (1): 31–46. doi:10.1386/eapc.4.1.31_1. ISSN 2051-7084.
- ——— (2 April 2020). "Hayao Miyazaki's European Animation: From European Literary Influences to Nostalgic Re-imaginings". Wasafiri. 35 (2): 67–73. doi:10.1080/02690055.2020.1721124.
