= Nausicaa.net =

English-language fan website for Studio Ghibli

- Website type: Informational site
- Available in: English
- Owner: Team Ghiblink
- Creator: Team Ghiblink
- Website: www.nausicaa.net
- Commercial: No
- Registration: None
- Launched: 1994 (on tcp.com) 1996 (as Nausicaa.net)
- Current status: Active

Nausicaa.net is an English-language fan website established in 1996 to contain information discussed on the Miyazaki Mailing List and to be a general resource for information regarding Hayao Miyazaki, Isao Takahata, Studio Ghibli, and related topics.

== History ==
The site was originally named The Miyazaki Web and was hosted from 1994 on tcp.com before being moved to a dedicated host by Jeremy Blackman in 1996. Team Ghiblink, the group of volunteers who maintain the site, was formed in 1996 from people on the Miyazaki Mailing list (which was established in 1991). The site is used as a major source of Studio Ghibli information by anime news sources such as Anime News Network.

It is named after one of Miyazaki's films, Nausicaä of the Valley of the Wind.

One of the major efforts by Nausicaa.net was the creation and distribution of press kits for the Kiki's Delivery Service video release and the Princess Mononoke theatrical release. The site also hosts a searchable archive index of the Miyazaki Mailing list.

The site was hacked in October 1998 and was mostly recovered and relaunched in early 1999 through the efforts of many people who used the site as well as through backups made by early versions of Google Search.

== Awards and recognition ==
In 1999, the Science Fiction Weekly named Nausicaa.net its "Site of the Week", stating it was "unbelievably comprehensive", "well organized", and for "anything related to Miyazaki, there's no better resource on the Web."

Neil Gaiman, who wrote the English language script for Princess Mononoke, stated that he used Nausicaa.net when he first began working on the script, and that the site and those running it were "tremendously helpful".

Nausicaa.net was named one of Intute's Best of the Web in January 2007 in the Arts & Humanities category.
