= Animation (journal) =

- Discipline: Animation studies
- Language: English
- Edited by: Suzanne Buchan

Publication details
- History: 2006-present
- Publisher: SAGE Publications
- Frequency: Triannually

Standard abbreviations
- ISO 4: Animation

Indexing
- ISSN: 1746-8477 (print); 1746-8485 (web)
- LCCN: 2008205573
- OCLC no.: 300316343

Links
- Journal homepage; Online access; Online archive

Animation is a triannual peer-reviewed academic journal that covers the field of film and media studies, focusing on animations implications for other forms of media. The editor-in-chief is Suzanne Buchan (Royal College of Art). It was established in 2006 and is currently published by SAGE Publications.

== Abstracting and indexing ==
Animation is abstracted and indexed in:

- Academics Premier
- Arts and Humanities Citation Index
- British Humanities Index
- Current Contents/Arts & Humanities
- Educational Research Abstracts Online
- Scopus
