= Andrew Osmond (journalist) =

British journalist and writer

Andrew Osmond is a British freelance journalist and writer.

== Biography ==
Osmond is based in Berkshire, England, and has worked as a journalist for publications such as Sight and Sound and SFX, specialising in film and animation.

Osmond published a book examining the film Spirited Away (2001), directed by Hayao Miyazaki, in 2008. In a review for Sight and Sound, the animation scholar Rayna Denison appreciated the blend of commentary on the film with discussion of Miyazaki's career, which she felt had been done with "subtlety". She found the long plot summary to be the least compelling part of the work.

Osmond wrote a book focusing on several films and television series by Satoshi Kon in 2009. The scholar Terry Hong wrote in a review for Library Journal that Osmond had afforded "painstaking" detail to each of the works covered, and appreciated the depth of research he had conducted. However, Hong found certain sections to be repetitive.

In 2010, Osmond published a reference work analysing a selection of animated films titled 100 Animated Feature Films. A Choice reviewer described it as "lavish, scholarly, [and] immensely readable". Sight and Sound's Nick Bradshaw found it to be an "upsized contribution" to the British Film Institute's series of film guides, but felt that the inclusion of certain films felt "forced".

== Selected bibliography ==
- ——— (2008). Spirited Away. Palgrave Macmillan. ISBN 978-1-8387-1952-4. (Note: A second edition was published in 2020 by the British Film Institute.)
- ——— (2009). Satoshi Kon: The Illusionist. Stone Bridge Press. ISBN 978-1-933330-74-7.
- ——— (2010). 100 Animated Feature Films. Bloomsbury Publishing. ISBN 978-1-83871-051-4.
- ——— (2017). Ghost In The Shell. Arrow Books. ISBN 978-0-99330-602-0.
- ——— (2022). The Art of Pacific Rim: The Black. Titan Books. ISBN 978-1-78909-945-4.
