= Konigs-Krone =

Confectionery and Cake Company in Kobe, Japan

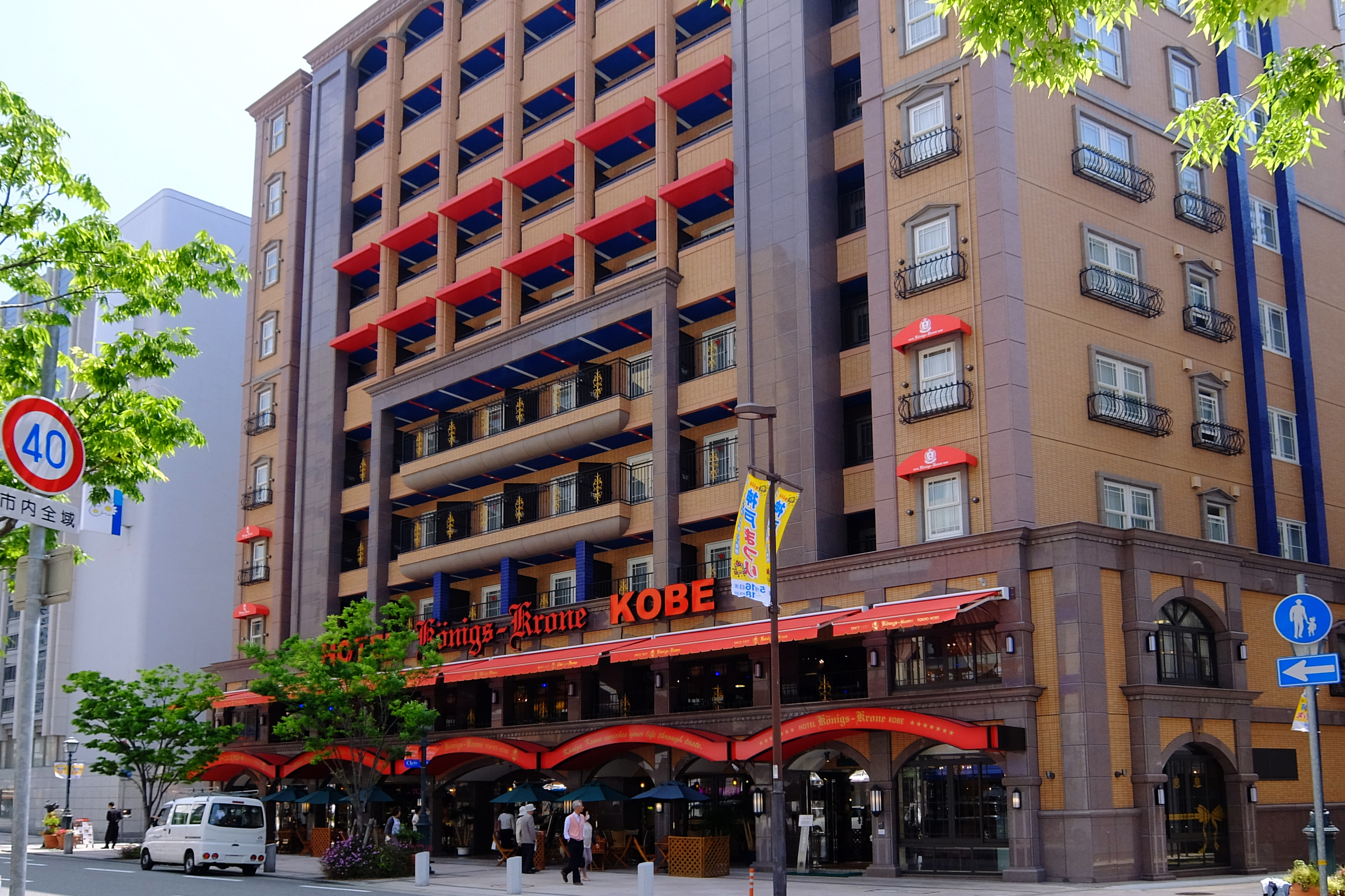
Hotel Konigs-Krone Kobe in Sannomiya, Kobe, Japan

Konigs-Krone (株式会社ケーニヒスクローネ, Kabu-shiki Gaisha Kēnihisu Kurōne) is a Western-style confectionery and cake company headquartered in Kobe, Japan. Founded in 1977, the company has since expanded and now owns restaurants at thirty-one locations in Japan, mostly in the Kansai region.

The company name "Konigs-Krone" originates in "Königskrone" that means "King's crown" in German language.
