= Princess Mononoke =

1997 Japanese animated film by Hayao Miyazaki

- Theatrical release poster

Japanese name
- Japanese: もののけ姫
Transcriptions
- Revised Hepburn: Mononoke-hime
- Directed by: Hayao Miyazaki
- Written by: Hayao Miyazaki
- Produced by: Toshio Suzuki
- Starring: Yōji Matsuda; Yuriko Ishida; Yūko Tanaka; Kaoru Kobayashi; Masahiko Nishimura; Tsunehiko Kamijō; Akihiro Miwa; Mitsuko Mori; Hisaya Morishige
- Cinematography: Atsushi Okui
- Edited by: Takeshi Seyama
- Music by: Joe Hisaishi
- Production company: Studio Ghibli
- Distributed by: Toho
- Release date: July 12, 1997
- Running time: 133 minutes
- Country: Japan
- Language: Japanese
- Budget: ¥2.35 billion
- Box office: US$231.3 million

Princess Mononoke (Note: Japanese: もののけ姫, Hepburn: Mononoke-hime) is a 1997 Japanese animated epic historical fantasy film written and directed by Hayao Miyazaki. Set in the Muromachi period of Japanese history, the film follows Ashitaka, a young Emishi prince who journeys west to cure his cursed arm and becomes embroiled in the conflict between the forest of the gods and a nearby town, as well as the feud between Lady Eboshi, the town's leader, and San, a human girl raised by wolves. Produced by Toshio Suzuki, animated by Studio Ghibli, and distributed by Toho, it stars the voices of Yōji Matsuda, Yuriko Ishida, Yūko Tanaka, Kaoru Kobayashi, Masahiko Nishimura, Tsunehiko Kamijō, Akihiro Miwa, Mitsuko Mori, and Hisaya Morishige.

Miyazaki began developing early concepts in 1980 and later considered basing a film on the Hōjōki (1212), a Japanese literary classic; elements of both evolved substantially into the eventual film. After taking a break to direct On Your Mark (1995), he led the production with a budget of ¥2.35 billion, making it the most expensive animated film at the time. Some computer-generated imagery and other digital techniques were used in conjunction with hand-drawn animation, a first for Miyazaki. The film explores themes of environmentalism and societal diversity, partly inspired by Miyazaki's readings into novel historical and cultural studies, and presents a feminist portrayal of its characters. It also blends fantastical elements with its depiction of medieval Japanese history, influenced by the jidaigeki style. The score was composed by Joe Hisaishi, a longtime collaborator of Miyazaki's.

Princess Mononoke was theatrically released in Japan on July 12, 1997, and broke several box office records. Suzuki led the film's marketing, then the largest advertisement campaign in Japan. It eventually became the highest-grossing film in the country. Following a distribution deal struck between Tokuma Shoten and Walt Disney Studios, it was the first of Studio Ghibli's films to be released internationally and was given to Miramax Films to be dubbed into English and distributed in North America. Neil Gaiman wrote the translation, making significant alterations for its American audience; the dub underperformed at the box office. As of 2026, the film has grossed US$231.3 million through various theatrical and home media releases. It received a broadly positive critical response in both Japan and the United States and earned a number of major Japanese accolades, including top awards at the Mainichi Film Awards and the Japan Academy Film Prize. Its sustained popularity and cultural impact have since made it a cult film.

== Plot summary ==
In Muromachi-era Japan, the last Emishi prince, Ashitaka, kills a gigantic demon to protect his village, but his arm is afflicted by its curse. The demon, once the boar god Nago, was corrupted by an iron ball embedded in its body. Learning that the curse will eventually kill him, Ashitaka is exiled to the west, seeking a cure by uncovering the source of Nago's hatred.

On his journey, Ashitaka discovers that the curse grants him supernatural strength. He encounters a monk named Jigo, who advises him to seek answers in the nearby mountains from the Forest Spirit – a deer-like god of life and death that transforms into the giant Nightwalker at sunset. Guided by tiny kodama, Ashitaka passes through the forest of the gods, where he catches a glimpse of the Forest Spirit. Meanwhile, Lady Eboshi and her men repel an attack by a pack of wolves led by the wolf goddess Moro and her adopted human daughter, San.

Ashitaka arrives at Irontown, (Note: Japanese: タタラ場, Hepburn: Tataraba; named after the Japanese tatara furnace.) a settlement that has deforested the surrounding area to mine iron, leading to conflicts with the animal gods of the forest. The town shelters former prostitutes, who stoke massive furnaces, and people with leprosy, who manufacture firearms. Eboshi, the town's leader, admits to shooting Nago, instilling the hatred that corrupted him. She also reveals her plan to kill the Forest Spirit, hoping to eradicate the gods and enable Irontown to prosper. Ashitaka's cursed arm tries to kill her, but he resists its influence. Eboshi is collaborating with the mercenary Jigo, who stands to be richly rewarded for delivering the Forest Spirit's head – believed to grant immortality – to the Emperor.

The wolves attack; San, whom the townspeople call "Princess Mononoke", infiltrates Irontown and duels Eboshi. Ashitaka subdues them both and attempts to negotiate peace, but a townsperson shoots him. Strengthened by the curse, he takes San out of the town before collapsing. San threatens to kill him for sparing Eboshi, but is taken aback when he compliments her beauty. She brings Ashitaka to the Forest Spirit, who heals his wound but leaves the curse. The next day, a boar clan led by the blind god Okkoto declares its intention to attack Irontown, preferring to die in battle rather than witness their kind diminish. Ashitaka recovers and implores Moro to let San escape with him, but is banished from the forest instead.

The boars assault Irontown's forces but are annihilated by their weaponry. San and the mortally wounded Okkoto retreat to the forest, unknowingly followed by Eboshi and Jigo, who use the carcasses of the fallen boars to deceive Okkoto into leading them to the Forest Spirit. San tries to stop Okkoto, but his pain transforms him into a demon, engulfing her. With Moro's remaining strength, she and Ashitaka free San. The Forest Spirit grants peaceful deaths to Okkoto and Moro. As it transforms into the Nightwalker, Eboshi beheads it. Its body explodes into a dark, chaotic fluid that expands in search of its head, killing everything it touches – including the forest – and briefly reanimates Moro's head, which bites off Eboshi's arm.

Though reluctant to help the humans, San joins Ashitaka in pursuing Jigo to recover the Forest Spirit's head. Ashitaka evacuates Irontown as the Nightwalker's body floods it, and together, he and San fight Jigo for the head and return it to the Nightwalker. As the sun rises, the Nightwalker dies and dissolves into the wind. In its place, the devastated land is renewed with abundant flora, and Ashitaka's curse is lifted. A repentant Eboshi resolves to rebuild Irontown better, and Ashitaka chooses to remain and help. San, while admitting to Ashitaka that she loves him, is unable to forgive humanity and stays in the forest. They promise to meet as often as they can.

== Voice cast ==
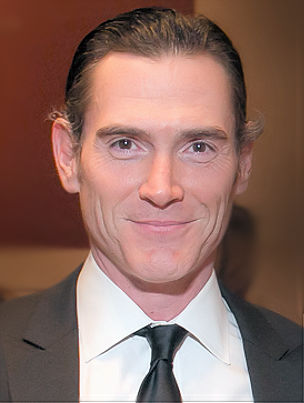
Billy Crudup (pictured in 2015) voiced Ashitaka in the English dub.

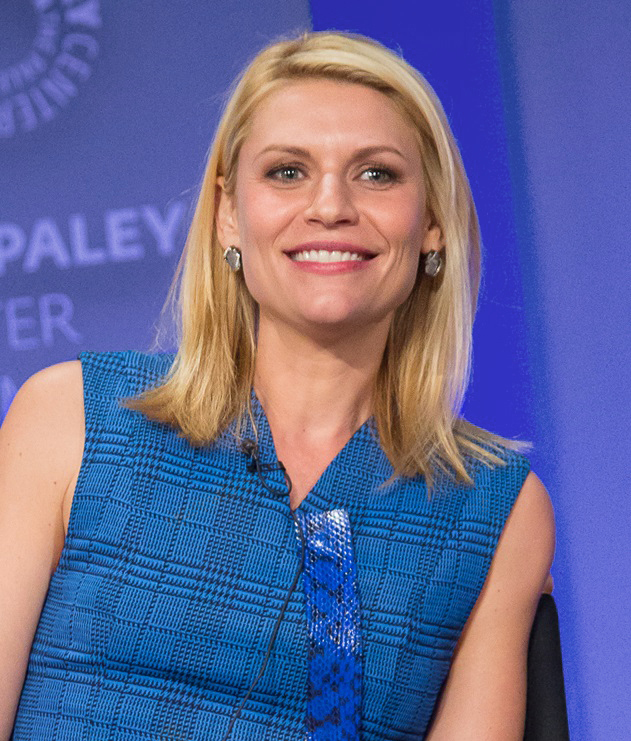
Claire Danes (pictured in 2015) voiced San.

Characters and voice cast
Character name		Voice actor	
English	Japanese	Japanese (1997)	English (1999)
Ashitaka	Ashitaka (アシタカ)	Yōji Matsuda	Billy Crudup
San	San (サン)	Yuriko Ishida	Claire Danes
Lady Eboshi	Eboshi Gozen (エボシ御前)	Yūko Tanaka	Minnie Driver
Jigo	Jiko-bō (ジコ坊)	Kaoru Kobayashi	Billy Bob Thornton
Kohroku	Kōroku (甲六)	Masahiko Nishimura	John DeMita
Gonza	Gonza (ゴンザ)	Tsunehiko Kamijō	John DiMaggio
Toki	Toki (トキ)	Sumi Shimamoto	Jada Pinkett Smith
Wolf	Yama-inu (山犬)	Tetsu Watanabe	Unknown
Nago	Nago no Kami (ナゴの守)	Makoto Satō	John DiMaggio
Cattleman Leader	Ushikai no Osa (牛飼いの長)	Akira Nagoya	Unknown
Moro	Moro no Kimi (モロの君)	Akihiro Miwa	Gillian Anderson
Oracle	Hī-sama (ヒイ様)	Mitsuko Mori	Debi Derryberry
Okkoto	Okkoto-nushi (乙事主)	Hisaya Morishige	Keith David

== Development ==
=== Early concepts and pre-production ===
Hayao Miyazaki composed the preliminary ideas for what would become Princess Mononoke in 1980 after releasing his first film, The Castle of Cagliostro (1979), drawing sketches of a princess living in the woods with a beast. The story was roughly based on the "Beauty and the Beast" (1740) fairy tale, set in historical Japan. The Beast was realized as an animalistic spirit (mononoke) whom the protagonist, the daughter of a nobleman, is forced to marry. After unsuccessfully proposing the film project to several production companies, Miyazaki published his concepts in a book in 1983, republished in 2014 as Princess Mononoke: The First Story. He reused various ideas from this project in works such as My Neighbor Totoro (1988) and Porco Rosso (1992). Shuna's Journey (1983) in particular bears the closest resemblance to the eventual film, featuring a protagonist who rides an elk to the land of gods. A few fundamental ideas from the 1980 concept appear in the final film, but the character designs and plot are entirely different. The film scholar Raz Greenberg wrote that the original concept also "[portrayed] the end of tyranny vividly", in contrast with the film, showing the antagonist's fortress destroyed and its slaves emancipated. According to the film scholar Rayna Denison, the stark difference between the original idea and the final film demonstrates the radical change of Miyazaki's filmmaking philosophies during that time. He took cues from Japanese folklore, especially the tale of a princess with a birthmark, which evolved over time into Ashitaka's curse.

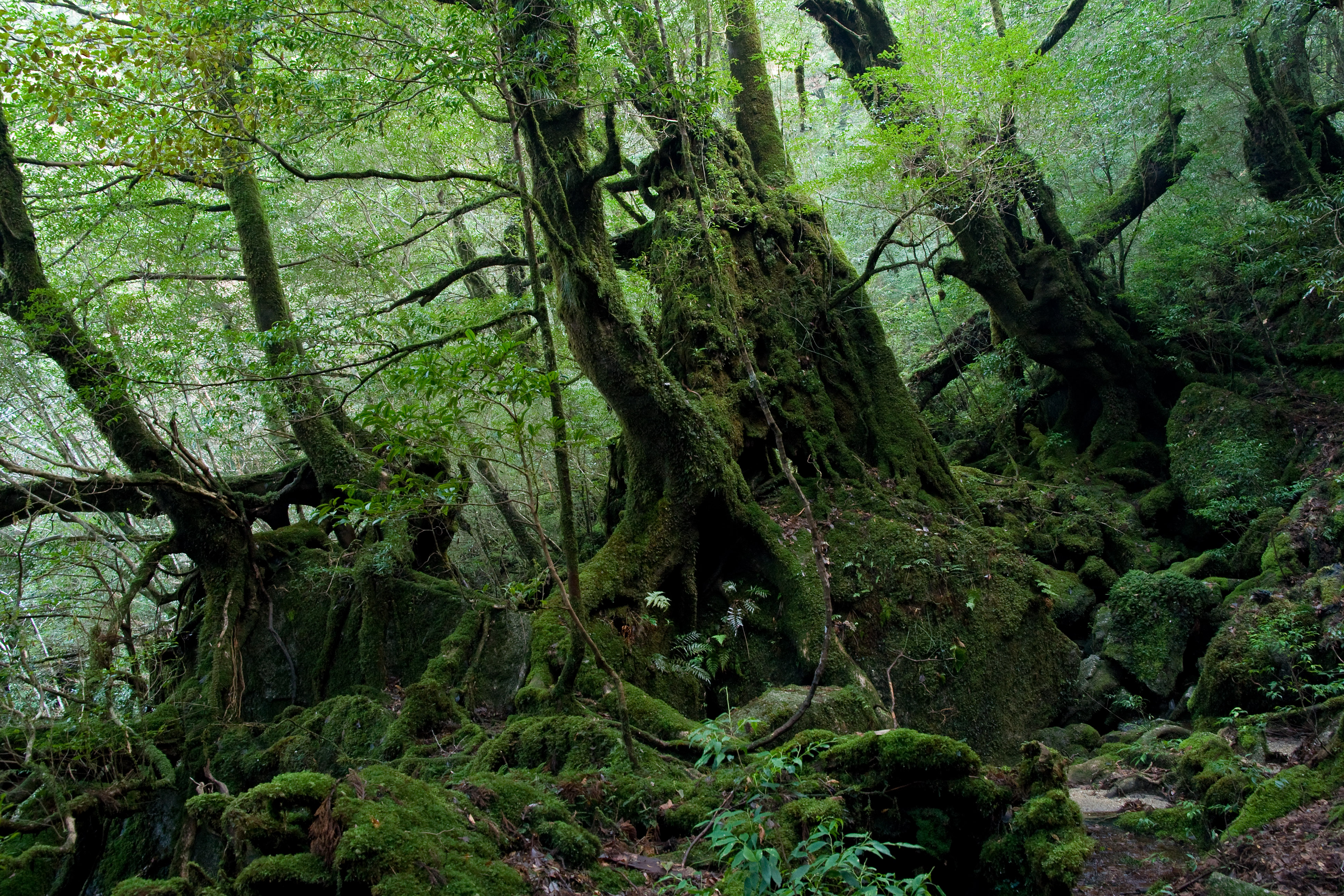
Some of the film's natural scenery was inspired by a visit to the forests of Yakushima.

Inspired by the writings of Yoshie Hotta, Miyazaki also considered creating a film adaptation of the Hōjōki (1212), a Japanese literary classic on the ephemerality of life. It was written by the poet Kamo no Chōmei during a period of political turmoil and natural disasters, which the animation scholar Susan J. Napier felt resonated with the "increasing sense of vulnerability" in Japanese culture during the time of the film's production. (Note: See § Conflicts of nature, technology, and humanity for further information.) However, Miyazaki felt the concept was "far removed from common sense" and had no possibility of commercial success; he never moved forward with this concept but continued to consider creating a historical piece. Upon the completion of his manga series Nausicaä of the Valley of the Wind (1982–1994), Miyazaki began work on the project proposal for the film in August 1994. However, encountering writer's block in December, he took a break from the production to direct the short film On Your Mark (1995) as a side project. Miyazaki returned to the film in April 1995 and began working on the storyboards in May. The film's broad scope and high level of detail extended the pre-production process. That month, Miyazaki took four of the art directors to visit the island of Yakushima, which had already inspired some environments in Nausicaä of the Valley of the Wind, to achieve the environmental depiction that he was seeking to portray. The island's relative lack of development informed their sketches of the film's forest of the gods. The fifth art director, Kazuo Oga, went to the Shirakami-Sanchi mountains to draw inspiration for the Emishi village.

=== Production and animation ===
Princess Mononoke was the most expensive animated film ever produced in Japan at the time. It was originally allocated a budget of ¥2 billion, which was expanded to ¥2.35 billion (Note: Equivalent to ¥2.61 billion in 2024) later in the production, more than double that of any previous Studio Ghibli film. Miyazaki stated, "I don't care if the studio goes bankrupt." The animation production commenced in July 1995. Miyazaki created the storyboards using the approach he took toward serialized manga, writing the film's plot as he drew the scenes. His declining sight initially caused him to use oversized paper, but he switched back to the normal size to increase the pace of the storyboarding. This process was done in parallel with the animation, and the final boards outlining the end of the film were not finished until January 1997.

An unusually high level of detail was afforded illustrating backgrounds and animating background characters due to the large budget available. The decision to assign five art directors to the film was also unprecedented. Each tackled a different aspect; for example, one handled daylight shots while another covered the nighttime. The film used approximately 144,000 cels, 80,000 of them being key animation frames, more than any other Studio Ghibli film. Miyazaki is estimated to have drawn or retouched nearly 80,000 cels himself. The final shots were completed in June 1997, less than a month from the release date.

=== Computer graphics ===
3D rendering was used to create writhing demon flesh that was digitally composited onto a hand-drawn Ashitaka.

The film was created using a combination of hand-drawn animation and computer-generated imagery; approximately five minutes were animated entirely using digital processes. A further ten minutes use digital ink and paint, a technique used in all subsequent Studio Ghibli films. The company's hand-drawn methods were becoming outdated by the late 1990s, and by 1997, members of Studio Ghibli's computer graphics team felt that the adoption was made largely out of necessity. According to Mamoru Oshii – a contemporary of Miyazaki's – digital painting was adopted at the insistence of Michiyo Yasuda, a senior colorist at Studio Ghibli. While Studio Ghibli had already begun experimenting with digital techniques a few years prior on Pom Poko (1994), its computer graphics department was opened during the production of Princess Mononoke.

Miyazaki's distaste for digital animation techniques was well known in Japan before the film's release, so his use of computer graphics came as a surprise, according to Denison. He made the decision to use the new techniques early in the production, starting with the demon god in the opening sequence. Certain sequences were created using 3D tools and then processed to resemble a traditionally animated sequence using a program called Toon Shader, developed by Microsoft at the studio's request. Some of this work was outsourced to the animation studio Toyo Links. Three broad categories of digital techniques were applied to the animation: the use of digital ink and paint to finish coloring hand-drawn frames; 3D rendering and digital compositing, which put the hand-drawn images in a three-dimensional environment to create more visual depth; and morphing and particle effects, which create additional detail and smoother transitions. Yoshinori Sugano, the head of the computer graphics department, recalled that the most involved uses of digital techniques were to mask the transitions between the digital and hand-drawn elements on screen. Some characters, particularly the gods, alternate between rendering approaches in different shots.

== Themes ==
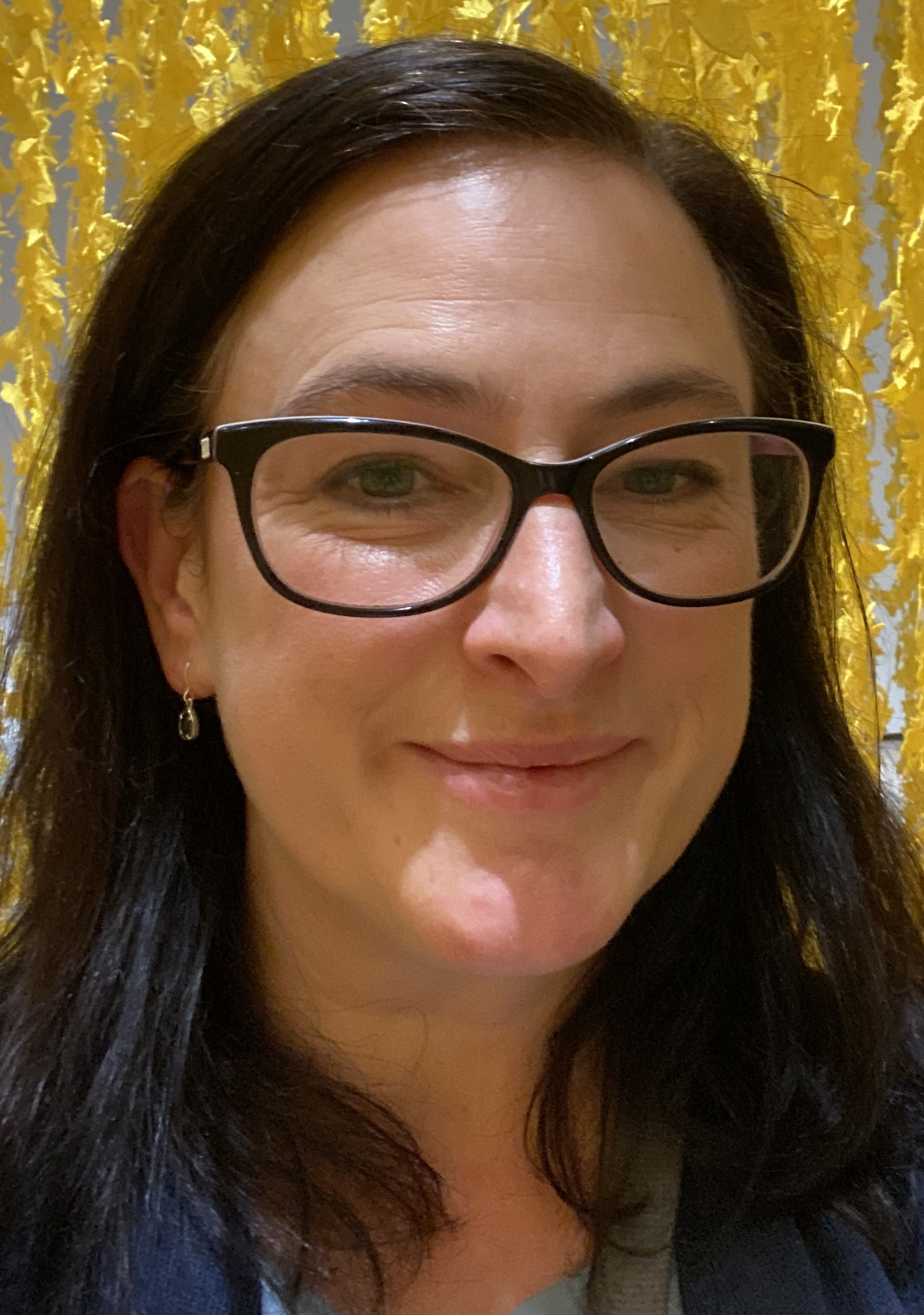
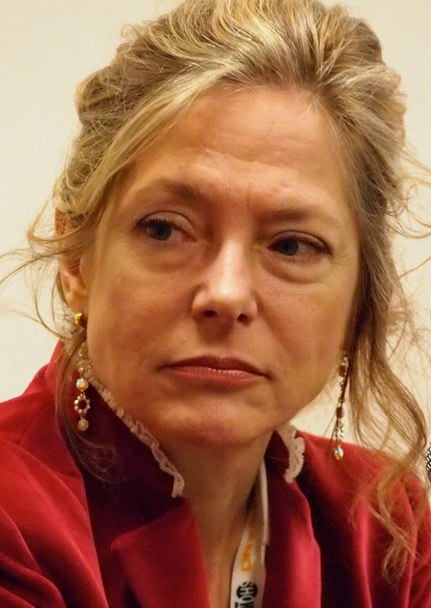
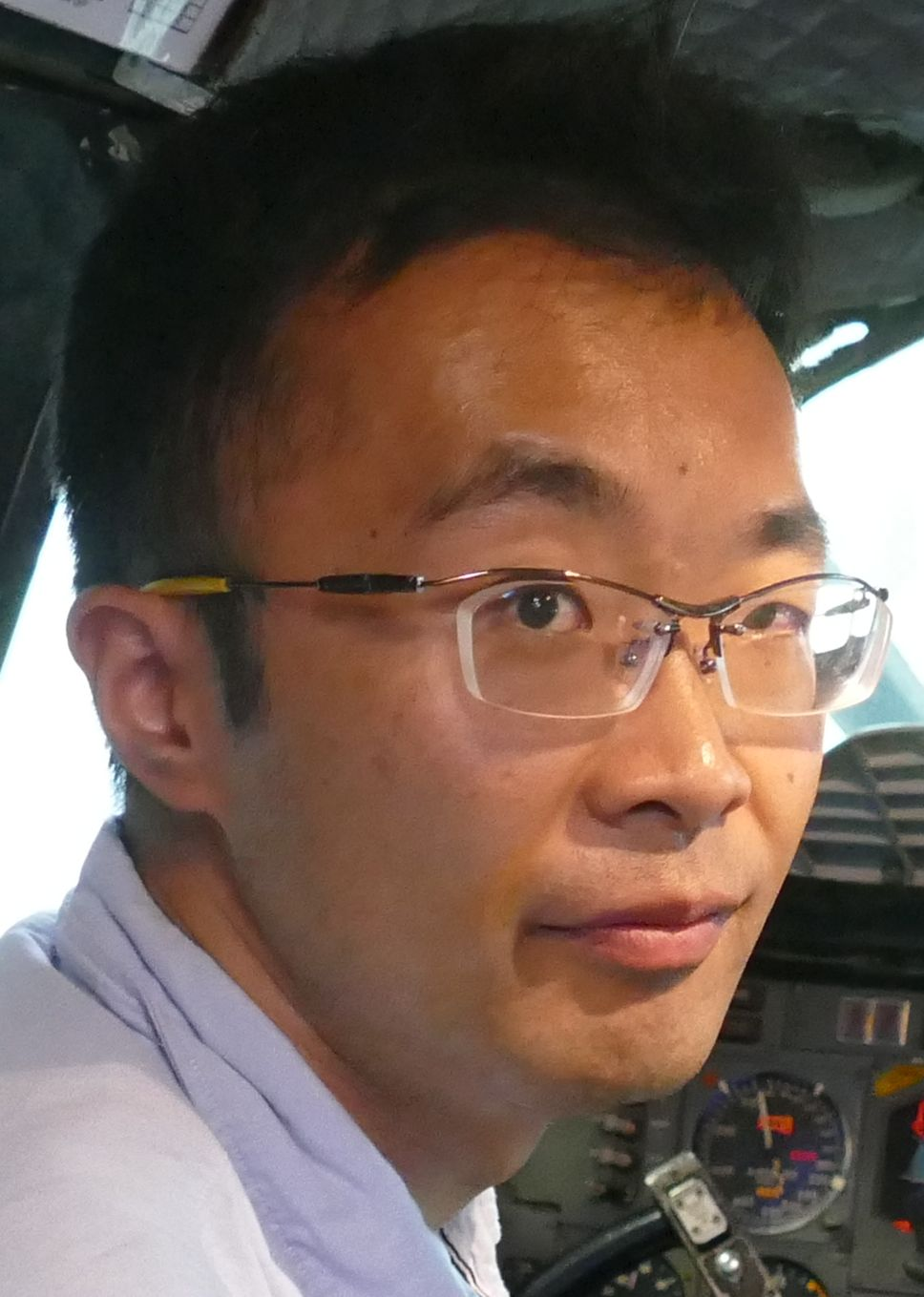
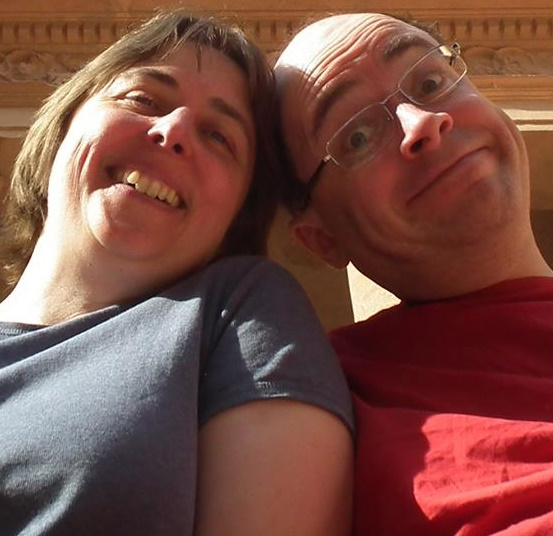
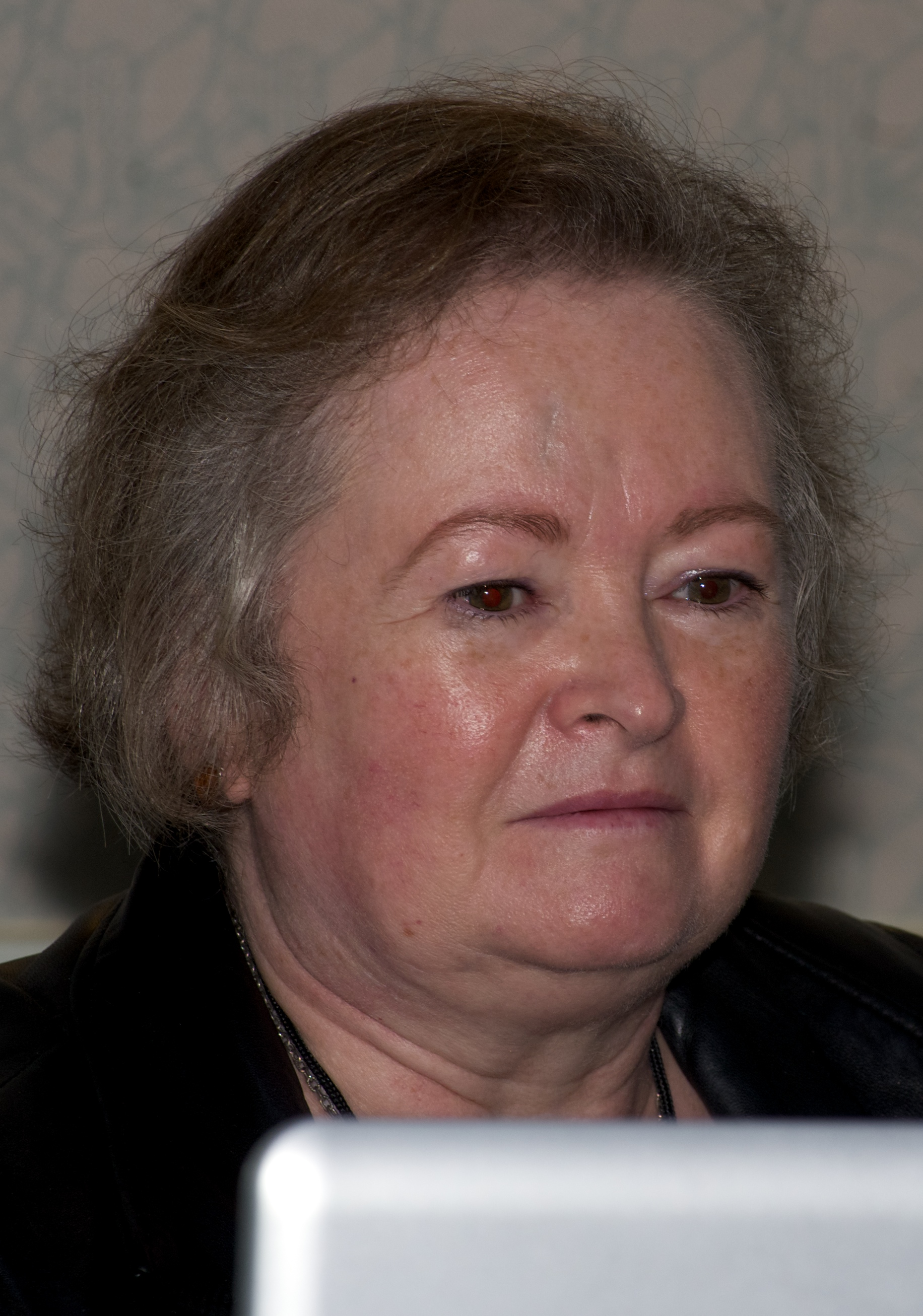
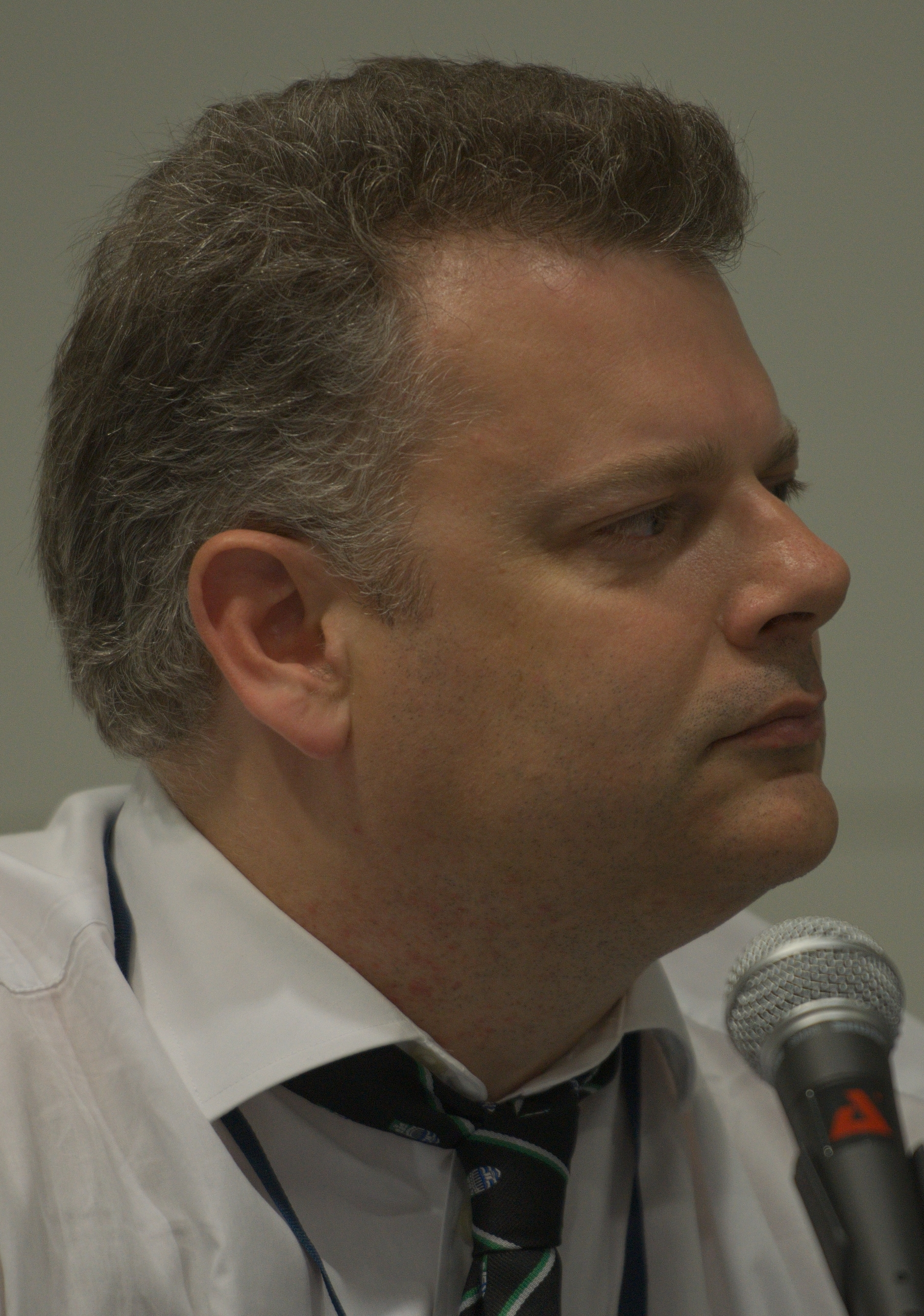
(Clockwise from top left) Rayna Denison, Susan J. Napier, Shiro Yoshioka, Jonathan Clements, Helen McCarthy, Colin Odell, and Michelle Le Blanc

Several scholars have explored the themes of Princess Mononoke in their work.

=== Conflicts of nature, technology, and humanity ===
Environmentalism is a central theme of Princess Mononoke. In the war between the forest gods and the people of Irontown, Ashitaka serves as the mediator. Unlike many Western works with similar themes, the film does not present these positions as complete opposites, nor does it outright reject modernity and technology. The scholars Tracey Daniels-Lerberg and Matthew Lerberg wrote that it instead "[embraces] the unpredictable outcomes that emerge in the uncertainty that remains." Both humanity and nature are given equal standing in the film's world, and Napier wrote that the film "offers a vision of life as a densely interwoven design, rather than a simple allegory of dichotomized opposites." Additionally, the film portrays internal strife within parties on both sides of the conflict: the different clans of spirits disagree on how to handle the conflict, and the humans war amongst themselves for various reasons. Ashitaka's relationships with both parties are volatile and "even dissatisfying at moments", according to Daniels-Lerberg and Lerberg. They attribute this sense of unease to the focus on emotion, rather than strict logic, that the film puts on the conflict. According to the film critic Roger Ebert, Princess Mononoke is not a "simplistic tale of good and evil, but the story of how humans, forest animals, and nature gods all fight for their share of the new emerging order."

The film scholars Colin Odell and Michelle Le Blanc wrote that the film simultaneously mounts a criticism of humanity's mistreatment of the natural world and "grudgingly admits" that some disputes are inevitable to facilitate technological progress. While Irontown is shown to be a haven for downtrodden members of society, who have the opportunity to live honest lives and enjoy fair treatment from Eboshi, the conflict arises from the harm that the settlement causes to the surrounding environment. Greenberg identified this dynamic as a marked increase in complexity from Miyazaki's earlier works, which typically presented a utopian model as an answer to social issues. Miyazaki expressed that he "meant to state [his] objection to the way environmental issues are treated", referring to the general exclusion of humanity's role in environmental discourse in Japan. The ecological writings of the historian Sasuke Nakao, especially his "evergreen forest culture theory", were greatly influential on Miyazaki when creating the film's forest of the gods. Miyazaki stated that "[Nakao's book] taught me what I was the descendent of", and provided him an alternative to many traditional depictions of Japanese history that he disliked.

Napier saw the film as an "elegy for a lost Japan", a version of the country that predates the modern patriarchal society and was controlled by nature. Setting the film in the Muromachi period allowed Miyazaki to depict the country before it had been deforested and altered by rice agriculture and positions the film within the moment of history when "humankind pushed nature into submission", according to the animation writers Jonathan Clements and Helen McCarthy. Miyazaki intended to portray the gods as "living animals, tortured by humans", feeling it to be an important aspect to depict in the relationship between nature and humanity. He was inspired for the film's concept by the Epic of Gilgamesh (c. 2100–1200 BCE), an ancient epic poem that depicts the death of the forest god and the ruin of humanity. The philosopher Takeshi Umehara, who wrote a stage play titled Gilgamesh (1988), had previously suggested that Miyazaki adapt his work into a film; Miyazaki had declined the offer at the time but later stated that he had unconsciously included elements similar to the play in Princess Mononoke. The film shares several themes with the Nausicaä of the Valley of the Wind manga, which Miyazaki had completed in 1994, namely the "environmental catastrophe, the role of technology and warfare, and human interactions with nonhuman species", according to Napier. Clements and McCarthy wrote that the film was conceived partly due to Miyazaki's discontent with the narrative of the manga's film adaptation (1984), in which the environmental theme was suddenly resolved via a deus ex machina.

Miyazaki's filmmaking style changed considerably in the 1990s in response to various geopolitical conflicts, including the Gulf War and the Yugoslav Wars following the dissolution of the Soviet Union. He was especially critical of Japan's decision to provide military aid in the Gulf War, which he considered a violation of Article 9 of the Japanese Constitution. These events disheartened Miyazaki, who compared them to the preamble to World War I and felt he was watching history repeat itself. In 1995, two disasters occurred in Japan that had a marked negative impact on its culture: the Great Hanshin earthquake, which killed thousands and became the worst on record since 1923, and the Tokyo subway sarin attack perpetrated by the Aum Shinrikyo cult. Napier wrote that these had an effect "on both a psychological and an environmental level" and heightened the country's cultural "emptiness" following the Japanese asset price bubble bursting in 1992. After finishing Porco Rosso, Miyazaki resolved to create a "substantial film" that acknowledged academic discourse, eschewing the escapist philosophy of his earlier works. He instead set out to depict the philosophy that, "no matter how messy things get, we have no choice but to go on living."

=== Heterogeneity of society ===
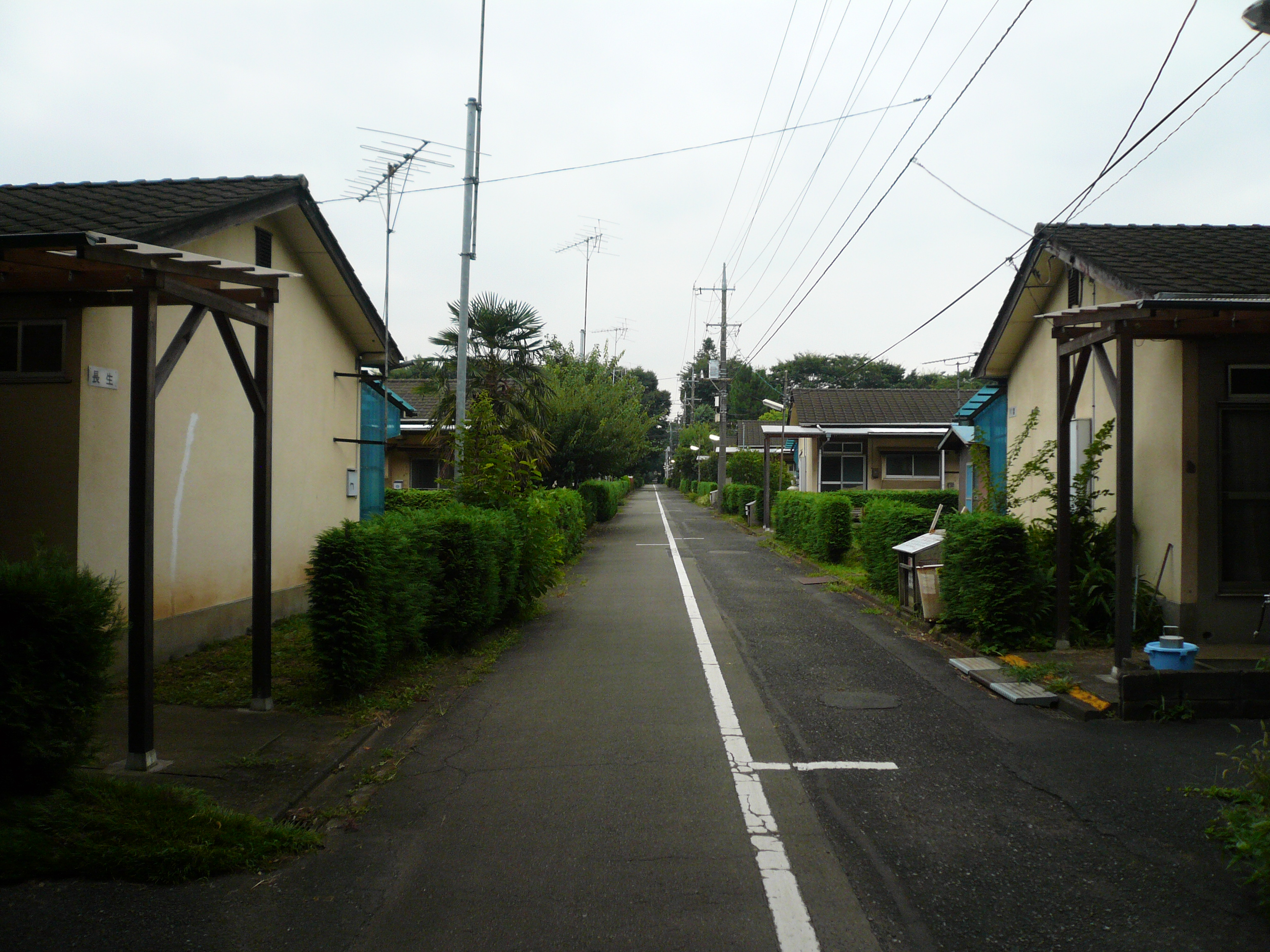
The Tama Zenshoen Sanatorium, which Miyazaki was inspired by during the production.

Napier wrote that "the sense of a broken heterogeneous world is stridently manifest" within Princess Mononoke. The film challenges popular cultural beliefs, such as the existence of a homogenous Japanese ethnicity (minzoku), by depicting social outcasts and peoples not of Yamato origin. The Emishi people are related to the modern Ainu people, and Miyazaki highlights this difference in the film: Ashitaka is immediately treated as a stranger at many of the villages he visits. The film scholar Eija Niskanen wrote that the film also critiques the Nihonjinron, a group of ethnonationalist theories about Japan that claim its culture is unique from others and depict the nation's people as uniform. The film scholar Shiro Yoshioka felt that the writing of Yoshihiko Amino, another historical scholar, influenced Miyazaki's writing in this regard. According to Denison, his explorations result in highly polarized characters and participants on both sides of the conflict becoming "monstrous". Miyazaki said that more recent historical studies had increasingly focused on the lifestyles of common people outside the nobility, many of which do not align with the theories of a minzoku. He was also inspired to portray people with leprosy after visiting the Tama Zenshoen Sanatorium near his home in Tokyo. He commented afterwards, "In the middle of no matter what kind of misery there is joy and laughter. In human life which tends toward ambiguity, I have never seen a place which shows this with such clarity."

Napier felt that the film proposes a possible future Japanese identity that highlights non-uniformity and the role of women. Toshio Suzuki – the film's producer and a longtime friend of Miyazaki's – stated that Miyazaki was a feminist and brought ideals of gender equality to his professional life as well as his fictional works. However, McCarthy felt that his prior portrayals of women were predicated in a fundamentally patriarchal worldview; Miyazaki's female characters succeed only when given the opportunity to in a society ultimately governed by men. She argued that the protagonists Ashitaka and San were constructed incrementally through various predecessors in Miyazaki's works. His earlier films also portrayed young characters as able and driven to change the world, which is not continued here. San, according to Napier, is an "embodiment of Miyazaki's anger with what he increasingly perceived as a stupid and chaotic world." She also found San's early appearance in the film with a bloodstained face to create a vivid image of violence, wildness, and "aggressive sexuality that is confrontational rather than alluring." McCarthy wrote that San is Miyazaki's only female protagonist to be entirely unbound from patriarchy, refusing to accept a domestic life even despite her love for Ashitaka. In a divergence from Miyazaki's previous works that close with clearly optimistic outlooks, the film ends in an ambiguous manner; the Forest Spirit's death revives nature, but the wild forests remain felled, and Ashitaka and San do not stay together but agree to occasionally meet.

Napier felt that the film's conflicting philosophies do not facilitate the inclusion of an antagonist of a similar kind to the Count from The Castle of Cagliostro or Muska from Castle in the Sky (1986). Eboshi's initial characterization sets her in the role of a villain: the belligerent of the environmental conflict and the cause of Nago's demonic corruption. However, this impression is repeatedly challenged by depictions of her leadership and caregiving qualities; the community of Irontown holds sincere respect for her, and her sheltering of former prostitutes and people affected by leprosy contravenes many traditional roles of femininity. Miyazaki's depictions of female characters working on iron and people with leprosy manufacturing weapons are considerable departures from historical views. Napier emphasized that the decision to place a female character in this leadership position prevents her stance from being viewed as a cliché of oppressive militarism or the interpretation of technology as inherently detrimental. She wrote that Eboshi can be viewed as a tragic character because she is not evil but is forced to become an aggressor to safeguard her progressive community. Although Eboshi and San represent diametrically opposed views, they share many leadership and nurturing characteristics, and the scholar Alice Vernon examined the relationship between the two as a symbiotic one, where Eboshi represents a possible future image of San.

== Style ==
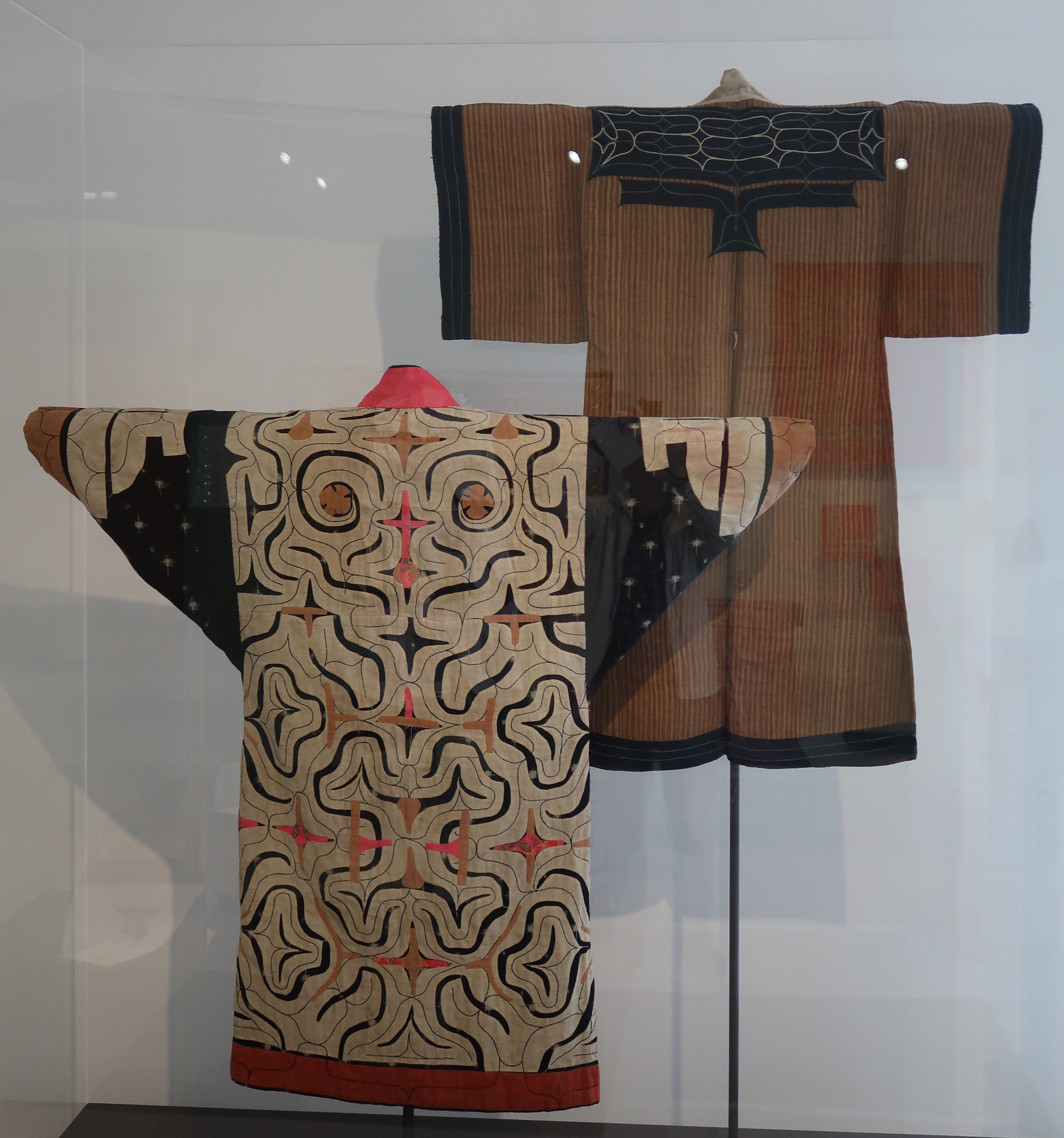
Some of the costumes in the film resemble traditional Ainu clothing.

Princess Mononoke marked the first time Miyazaki explored a jidaigeki style – a period drama focusing on the lives of historic Japanese people. He particularly appreciated the works of Akira Kurosawa, who had directed several key films in the genre. The film subverts many traditional elements of the jidaigeki, such as the portrayals of the Emperor and the samurai as sacred and noble. Miyazaki chose not to align with typical depictions of the Muromachi period, such as the development of high culture or Zen aesthetics in the capital city of Kyoto. Napier wrote that the forest of the gods also subverts typical depictions of nature in the Muromachi period; as opposed to carefully tended Zen gardens, it is untamed, violent, and largely avoided by humans. The film exaggerates its historical perspective to facilitate the narrative; Irontown, for example, was inspired primarily by metalworking settlements in China as well as a tatara furnace in the Shimane Prefecture. Miyazaki lacked a historical reference for the Emishi people's garments, so the clothing worn by the girls in Ashitaka's village is influenced by styles from Bhutan and Thailand, and other characters' embroidered fabrics resemble traditional Ainu clothing. Instead of traditional arms, guns are the primary weapons in the film's conflict. Isao Takahata – a fellow director and longtime friend of Miyazaki's – said that the film was "dangerously liable to give the audiences misconceived impressions of history." Napier wrote that the film goes "beyond realism" to support its themes, and the critic Kazuhiko Komatsu felt that its world, while sometimes consistent with historical fact, is essentially Miyazaki's fantasy.

According to Napier, the film presents a much "grimmer" tone than Miyazaki's previous works, inspired by the themes of the Hōjōki. She contrasted Miyazaki's previous depictions of historical settings to the film's rendering of the Muromachi period, which she wrote "refuses to sentimentalize the medieval history it highlights". The film is unusual in Miyazaki's filmography for its lack of flying sequences. Napier suggested that its focus on lateral motion over vertical can be tied to the "sense of entrapment and desperation" it presents. Studio Ghibli had begun hiring full-time animators by the early 1990s, in contrast to the industry standard of staff being employed on short-term contracts. Denison wrote that this helped the studio develop an animated "house style" over time. Miyazaki felt that an important aspect of this style was the studio's aptitude for illustrating the natural world; Denison observed from an interview with the art directors that their approach was to "simplify and caricature nature's essential meanings", prioritizing moments of contemplation and mindfulness of the surrounding landscape. The film uses a palette for the forest that contrasts with the pastel colors typically used in Miyazaki films, employing darker shades of green and brown. Napier emphasized that the medium of animation, compared to live action, is well suited for exploring the film's themes. The film depicts a number of animals and gods, but she noted that they are entirely distinct from the humans; most notably, the Forest Spirit presents a serene yet entirely foreign visage.

== Release ==
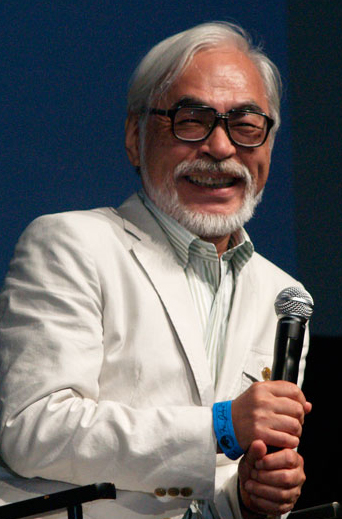
Hayao Miyazaki (pictured in 2009), the director

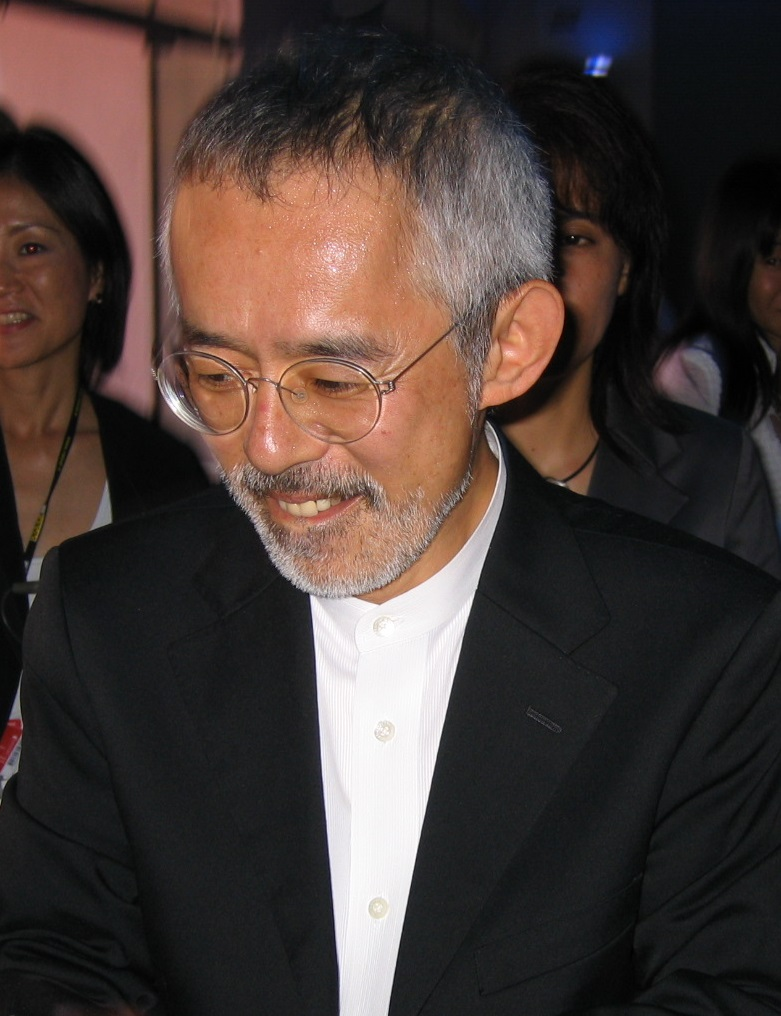
Toshio Suzuki (pictured in 2004), the producer

=== Marketing and Japanese release ===
The promotional strategy was spearheaded by Suzuki, who by 1997 had already developed relationships within the media industry while promoting previous Studio Ghibli releases. Napier noted that the marketing put the film under the Studio Ghibli brand for the first time – as opposed to previous works that were labeled primarily as Miyazaki films – which she felt reflected Suzuki's rising position as the studio's main producer. According to Suzuki, three important elements of the campaign were the repeated use of a recognizable title logo, key imagery from the film, and a tagline. The tagline underwent several iterations before, with Suzuki's input, the final phrase was chosen: "Live." Suzuki also changed the title from the original intention of The Legend of Ashitaka (Note: Japanese: アシタカせっ記, Hepburn: Ashitaka Sekki. Napier alternatively translated this title as The Tale of Ashitaka.) without Miyazaki's initial approval, as he found it less interesting. The budget allotted for the film's promotion was at least ¥2.6 billion, (Note: Equivalent to ¥2.89 billion in 2024) even higher than the production budget, making it the largest film advertisement campaign in Japan at the time. Yoshioka argued that it was essential for Princess Mononoke to be a commercial success to make up for the large production budget, and the scale of its campaign was significantly expanded from previous films' as a result. Several types of merchandise, such as stuffed kodama and copies of San's mask, were sold. A number of preview screenings were organized before the release to advertise the film by word of mouth; 130 of them were originally scheduled, and 70 were ultimately held, a number that the film scholar Seiji Kanō still found "astonishing". Miyazaki's previous film, Porco Rosso, had had only 23 screenings by comparison.

After Walt Disney Studios and Studio Ghibli's then–parent company, Tokuma Shoten, secured their distribution deal in 1997, the film would be the first among Miyazaki's works to receive a worldwide release. While the arrangement did extend the studio's reach to new regions, the announcement was made primarily to attract local audiences. Miyazaki also hinted at his retirement following the film's release, further piquing audience interest. The film was marketed as a split between an anime and an art house film, avoiding advertising in the mainstream ahead of its release. Denison felt that this choice was indicative of the studio's initial lack of confidence in the film's commercial viability and their perception of its financial riskiness. Yasuyoshi Tokuma, the president of Tokuma Shoten who frequently worked with Miyazaki, said in an interview before the release that it would be a "huge success" just to make back the investments that had been put into the film. Denison argued, however, that the marketing campaign's scale revealed the studio's ultimate aim to achieve a commercial success; she interpreted this approach as a "local equivalent of the 'calculated' blockbuster film."

Princess Mononoke was presented by Tokuma Shoten, Nippon Television, and Dentsu, and released by Toho in Japan on July 12, 1997. It was the subject of immense public anticipation, and it was screened at 260 of the country's 1800 cinemas, many of which reported audiences queueing to purchase tickets in previously unseen numbers. Tokuma Shoten's specialist magazine Animage, which had been closely associated with Studio Ghibli since the 1980s, released special issues on the film, as did several other publications. Newspapers began to refer to the film's release as the "Mononoke phenomenon", as by the end of its first week, the film had brought in over a million viewers and earned ¥1.5 billion (Note: Equivalent to ¥1.67 billion in 2024) at the box office. Advertising for the film labeled it a blockbuster (daihitto), and it increasingly competed with many high-profile films in the Japanese market, including Hollywood imports such as The Lost World: Jurassic Park (1997). By November, it had surpassed ¥9.65 billion (Note: Equivalent to ¥2.94 billion in 2024) in distribution rental sales, breaking the national record previously held by E.T. the Extra-Terrestrial (1982). During that period, 12 million people, a tenth of Japan's population at the time, saw the film in theaters. A year after the film's release, it had attracted over 14.2 million viewers and earned ¥11.3 billion (Note: Equivalent to ¥12.6 billion in 2024) in gross revenue, making it the all-time highest-grossing film in the country. (Note: The film was overtaken as the highest-grossing film in Japan shortly afterward by Titanic (1997).)

=== English dub and American release ===
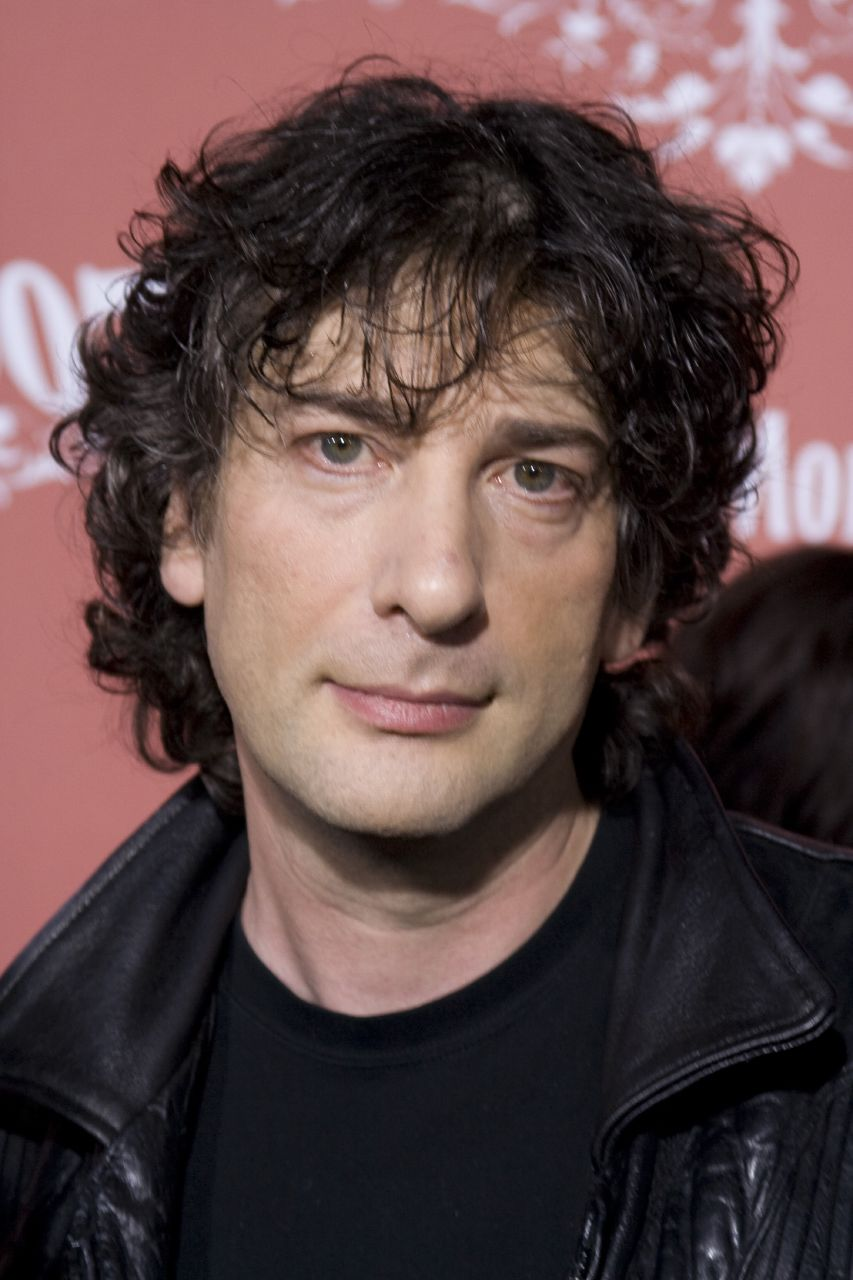
Neil Gaiman (pictured in 2007), who wrote the English script

As part of the Disney–Tokuma deal, the film was handed over to Miramax Films, a Disney subsidiary at the time, to dub and distribute in the United States and other regions. The dub was directed by Jack Fletcher, who had previously worked on the dubs of other Studio Ghibli films such as Kiki's Delivery Service, and its script was written by the fantasy author Neil Gaiman, who was an unusual choice for anime localizations at the time, according to Denison. Gaiman claimed that Harvey Weinstein, who was the head of Miramax at the time, initially offered the role to the film director Quentin Tarantino, who had then recommended Gaiman instead. Gaiman had intended to decline the offer before being impressed by a scene in which a stone wets in the falling rain, saying, "I have never seen anything like this. This is real filmmaking." Steve Alpert, an executive at Studio Ghibli, assisted with the translation.

Denison wrote that Miramax's approach to the dub "might be termed a project of indigenization" with an intent to form a new identity for the film outside of Japan. The language scholar Jennifer E. Nicholson wrote that the English dub's changes more closely approach an adaptation than a translation. Cultural differences between the United States and Japan, amplified by the film's discussion of specifically Japanese elements, resulted in a script that co-mingled the two languages and cultures. Gaiman inserted dialog for off-screen characters elucidating cultural concepts considered obscure for American audiences. Humor in particular demanded significant alterations; Gaiman approached the issue by searching for an "emotional equivalent" for the lines instead of considering the reason the originals were humorous. However, the title and dialog retained the Japanese word mononoke, which Nicholson argued could create the misconception that San's name is "Princess Mononoke", as well as downplaying the implications of the name San (which can refer to the number three in Japanese or the -san honorific). Gaiman later recalled that although he oversaw the writing process, some script alterations were made without his knowledge. Several of the changes removed terms that identified the setting, such as substituting sake with wine and removing mentions of Japan and China. Nicholson found these decisions indicative of Miramax's intent to strip the film of its cultural context and divorce it from history entirely. Gaiman also recalled his drafts receiving contradictory corrections from both Miramax and Studio Ghibli, to which he responded by writing two sets of revisions and asking them to "go fight it out amongst [themselves]."

The film featured a variety of celebrity voice actors who had developed followings in both traditional acting and voice acting roles. Denison wrote that various American and British accents were chosen to further remove elements of Japanese culture and color the film with "the 'American' voice that narrates it." The English-language release was marketed primarily as an art house film, and the media scholar Emma Pett felt that choosing the Miramax label rather than the family film–oriented Buena Vista label helped target the film towards a "middlebrow, culturally sophisticated audience" outside the mainstream. By this time, Weinstein had developed a reputation for importing and cutting international films to appeal to domestic audiences. However, among the terms of the distribution deal were that Studio Ghibli would approve and have ultimate control of the translation and that the film would not have any time cut. Weinstein attempted to convince Miyazaki and Suzuki otherwise but was unsuccessful. (Note: The potential editing of Princess Mononoke by Miramax Films has been the subject of rumor. The Guardian's Xan Brooks reported in 2005 that Miyazaki was rumored to have sent the then–head of Miramax, Harvey Weinstein, a samurai sword in the mail with the attached message, "No cuts." In response, Miyazaki stated, "Actually, my producer did that." He also claimed he "defeated" Weinstein's attempts to shorten the film's length. The claim has subsequently appeared in other media coverage. Emma Pett wrote in 2018 that Miyazaki was "complicit in the construction of his auteur image" and the perpetuation of the rumor by these responses. Steve Alpert recalled the events in his 2020 memoir, writing that Toshio Suzuki, after procuring a replica sword from a shop in Tokyo, presented it to Weinstein at a meeting in New York. He then "shouted in English and in a loud voice: 'Mononoke-hime, no cut!'") Gaiman said that Miramax rolled back the planned marketing campaign and opened the film in a very limited number of screens. The English dub was first screened at the 48th Berlin International Film Festival on February 11, 1998, and premiered at the Avery Fisher Hall in New York City on September 26, 1999. It underperformed at the American box office, earning only US$2.3 million.

=== Home media and other releases ===
The film was released on VHS in Japan by Buena Vista Home Entertainment in 1997 and on LaserDisc by Tokuma Shoten in 1998. Several related books have been published, including a manga series derived from the film's cels, art books with early sketches and storyboards, and reference works written by various academics. The English dub was released theatrically in Japan on April 29, 2000, with Japanese-language subtitles. A documentary titled Mononoke-hime in U.S.A. was released concurrently. These and other screenings internationally brought the English dub's total earnings to US$159 million at the time. The film has also been released on home media in various European and Asian regions.

The DVD release in North America was not initially set to include the Japanese audio track. Online petitions were opened to retain it, and the planned August 2000 release was consequently delayed. Miramax released the DVD on December 19, 2000, featuring the original Japanese audio, the English dub audio, and extras including a trailer and a documentary. Nikkei Business reported that 4.4 million DVD units were sold in Japan as of 2007.

Walt Disney Studios Home Entertainment released the film on Blu-ray in 2014, and it was included in a collection of Miyazaki's films in 2015. GKIDS re-issued it on DVD and Blu-ray in 2017. As of October 2020, the film has grossed US$9.2 million from Blu-ray sales in the United States. It has since received multiple worldwide theatrical re-releases, including at the annual Studio Ghibli Fest organized by GKIDS. GKIDS released the film in IMAX theaters in March 2025, featuring a remastered version in 4K resolution. Atsushi Okui, the vice president of Studio Ghibli, said that the original negatives had been preserved and rescanned in 4K over 10 years prior. The remaster grossed US$6.8 million at the North American box office, bringing the film's cumulative worldwide total to US$231.3 million as of February 2026.

== Music ==
Princess Mononoke Soundtrack

Soundtrack album by Joe Hisaishi
- Released: July 2, 1997
- Length: 65:05
- Label: Tokuma Japan Communications
- Producer: Joe Hisaishi

Joe Hisaishi chronology
Parasite Eve (1997)	Princess Mononoke Soundtrack (1997)	Hana-bi (1998)

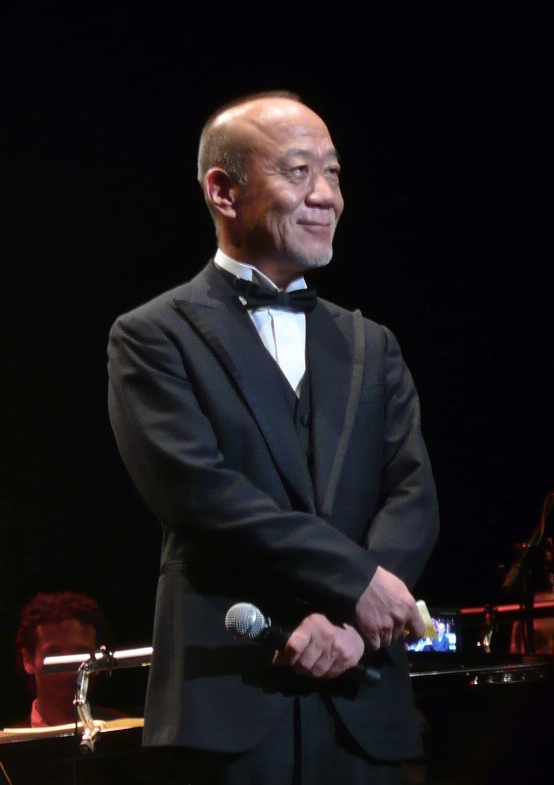
Joe Hisaishi (pictured in 2011), the soundtrack composer

As with most of Miyazaki's previous films, Princess Mononoke's score was composed by Joe Hisaishi. According to McCarthy, the score's development involved a much closer collaboration between the two than on previous works. Hisaishi first composed an image album – a collection of demos and musical sketches that serve as a precursor to the finished score – which he shared with Miyazaki and Suzuki. The unused title The Legend of Ashitaka appears here as the title of the opening theme. With their input, the demos were then worked into the final score, performed by the Tokyo City Philharmonic Orchestra. Tokuma Shoten released the image album in July 1996 and the soundtrack album in July 1997. The vocal theme song performed by the countertenor singer Yoshikazu Mera was released as a single before the film's release and became popular with Japanese audiences. A third version of the soundtrack, arranged for symphony orchestra and performed by the Czech Philharmonic, was released in 1998. All three albums were issued on vinyl records in 2020.

The vocal theme was re-recorded for the English dub by the American vocalist Sasha Lazard. Denison argued that this was a part of Miramax's efforts to remove the film's Japanese elements, but she also acknowledged that the score deviates substantially from a typical Hollywood-style compositional approach. For example, leitmotifs, which are commonly used to represent characters or settings, are instead used in transitional moments between more significant narrative events. McCarthy wrote that the film complements the scenes featuring music and dialog with a liberal use of silence and ambient sounds to augment the tension of certain moments, a significant departure from American scoring approaches. The musicology scholar Stacey Jocoy highlighted the emphatic use of brass instruments to accompany the film's epic story. Hisaishi employs Japanese pentatonic scales in conjunction with Western tonalities, and Jocoy analyzed the melody featuring this scale in San's theme as symbolic of her desire for "peace and beauty". The contrasting cluster chords – which she found similar to those of Igor Stravinsky's The Rite of Spring (1913) – are used to represent San's aggression.

Music releases for Princess Mononoke
Release date	English title	Japanese title	Estimated units
July 22, 1996	Princess Mononoke Image Album	もののけ姫 イメージアルバム	75,000
June 25, 1997	"Princess Mononoke" (Note: Released as a single by Yoshikazu Mera featuring the vocal theme song)	もののけ姫	605,000
July 2, 1997	Princess Mononoke Soundtrack	もののけ姫 サウンドトラック	500,000
July 8, 1998	Princess Mononoke Symphonic Suite	交響組曲 もののけ姫	80,000

== Reception ==
=== Critical response ===
The film was generally well received by critics in Japan, and Kanō described a "flurry of praise" in the Japanese media following its box office success. The Asahi Shimbun's Noboru Akiyama felt that the work displayed a "strong artistic quality" and a number of reviews in animation magazines highlighted its visual fidelity. Several publications featured articles from critics and academics covering several aspects of the film's production as well as interviews with key staff. According to Yoshioka, a variety of academics were attracted to write about the film due to themes such as Japanese cultural history being relatively "easy topics" to cover, as well as in response to Miyazaki's growing status as a public intellectual (bunkajin) within Japanese society. Some scholars speculated on the contributing factors to the film's success; a number commented on the reactions of younger audience members, who found the themes relatable to their personal struggles and empathized with its motifs of hope. Napier also wrote that the themes of conflict and coexistence with nature and the spirit world resonated strongly with Japanese viewers. Very few reviews directed criticism at the film, and among them Kanō found many of the comments to be "highly questionable". Kenichiro Horii of the Shūkan Bunshun found the text difficult to parse, and others were disappointed by the fantasy that Miyazaki had constructed. A few critics also faulted the female characters' lack of sex appeal.

Despite its poor performance in the American box office, the film received widespread praise from critics in the United States. On the review aggregator website Metacritic, the film was assigned a weighted average score of 76 out of 100 based on 29 critics, indicating "generally favorable" reviews. On Rotten Tomatoes, 93% of the 119 critics' reviews are positive, with an average rating of 8 out of 10. The website's consensus reads, "With its epic story and breathtaking visuals, Princess Mononoke is a landmark in the world of animation." In 2018, Pett conducted a meta-analysis of 1065 critical reviews published in the United States and the United Kingdom. Initial reviews often discussed the cultural differences that the film would exhibit and the alterations that Miramax had made to the presentation; Ty Burr of Entertainment Weekly was generally appreciative but felt "very curious to see if American audiences can handle it." While Janet Maslin of The New York Times felt that the film had been "effectively translated [...] without losing its Japanese essence", Michael Atkinson wrote in Mr. Showbiz that "an enormous amount of something or other got lost in the translation."

Many critics compared the film with the family-oriented works, primarily produced by Disney, which defined audience expectations for animations in the United States. Variety's Leonard Klady wrote that the film "[flies] in the face of popular Western animation" by eschewing musical numbers or narratives written to appeal to children. Stephen Hunter commented in an article for The Washington Post that the animation is "completely vivid and exquisitely detailed", but lacks the fluidity of Disney's works. Critics also highlighted the violence and mature themes as aspects inappropriate for children. Burr and others favorably compared the film's fantasy elements with those of Star Wars: Episode I – The Phantom Menace (1999) – which had been released a few months prior – and novels such as The Lord of the Rings (1954–1955) and The Chronicles of Narnia (1950–1956). Roger Ebert of the Chicago Sun-Times considered the film Miyazaki's best and recommended it for an Academy Award nomination. In the United Kingdom, however, the film received a very limited number of reviews and was largely panned by critics. Pett and the journalist Andrew Osmond ascribed this to a general negative perception of anime in British society at the time, rooted in controversies caused by some violent and sexually explicit animations.

Several publications have featured Princess Mononoke in their lists of best films. Animage ranked it 47th in their list of the 100 best anime in 2001. Empire ranked it 488th on their list of the 500 greatest films and placed it 3rd on their 2024 list of the 50 greatest animated films. It also ranked 13th on Paste's list of the 100 best anime films and 26th on Time Out and Total Film's lists of the greatest animated films.

=== Accolades ===
Japan submitted Princess Mononoke for Best Foreign Language Film at the 70th Academy Awards, but it was not nominated.

Accolades received by Princess Mononoke
Award / Publication	Year	Category	Recipient	Result	Ref.
Kinema Junpo	1997	Best Ten (Critics' Choice)	Princess Mononoke	Runner-up	
Kinema Junpo	1997	Best Ten (Readers' Choice)	Princess Mononoke	Won	
Kinema Junpo	1997	Best Director (Readers' Choice)	Hayao Miyazaki	Won	
52nd Mainichi Film Awards	1997	Best Film	Princess Mononoke	Won	
52nd Mainichi Film Awards	1997	Best Animation Film	Princess Mononoke	Won	
52nd Mainichi Film Awards	1997	Japanese Movie Fans' Choice	Princess Mononoke	Won	
10th Nikkan Sports Film Awards	1997	Best Director	Hayao Miyazaki	Won	
10th Nikkan Sports Film Awards	1997	Yūjirō Ishihara Award	Princess Mononoke	Won	
1st Japan Media Arts Festival	1997	Grand Prize in Animation	Princess Mononoke	Won	
7th Tokyo Sports Film Award	1997	Best Director	Princess Mononoke	Won	
Osaka Film Festival	1997	Special Award	Princess Mononoke	Won	
21st Fumiko Yamaji Award	1997	Cultural Award	Toshio Suzuki	Won	
15th Golden Gross Award	1997	Gold Award	Princess Mononoke	Won	
39th Japan Record Awards	1997	Best Composer	Joe Hisaishi	Won	
39th Japan Record Awards	1997	Best Album Production	Princess Mononoke Soundtrack	Won (Note: Shared with Sayuri Yoshinaga's Second Movement, Shimizu Yasuaki's Bach Box, and Neon Genesis Evangelion (all 1997))	
21st Japan Academy Film Prize	1998	Picture of the Year	Princess Mononoke	Won (Note: Princess Mononoke was the first animated film to be nominated for, and receive, this award.)	
21st Japan Academy Film Prize	1998	Special Award	Yoshikazu Mera	Won	
40th Blue Ribbon Awards	1998	Special Award	Princess Mononoke	Won	
22nd Hochi Film Awards	1998	Special Award	Princess Mononoke	Won	
12th Takasaki Film Festival	1998	Best Director	Hayao Miyazaki	Won (Note: Shared with Jun Ichikawa)	
Elan d'or Awards	1998	Special Prize	Princess Mononoke	Won	
28th Annie Awards	2000	Outstanding Individual Achievement for Directing in an Animated Feature Production	Hayao Miyazaki	Nominated (Note: Awarded for the English-language version of the film)	
4th Golden Satellite Awards	2000	Best Animated or Mixed Media Film	Princess Mononoke	Nominated	
27th Saturn Awards	2001	Best Home Video Release	Princess Mononoke	Won	
36th Nebula Awards	2001	Best Script	Princess Mononoke	Nominated	

== Legacy ==
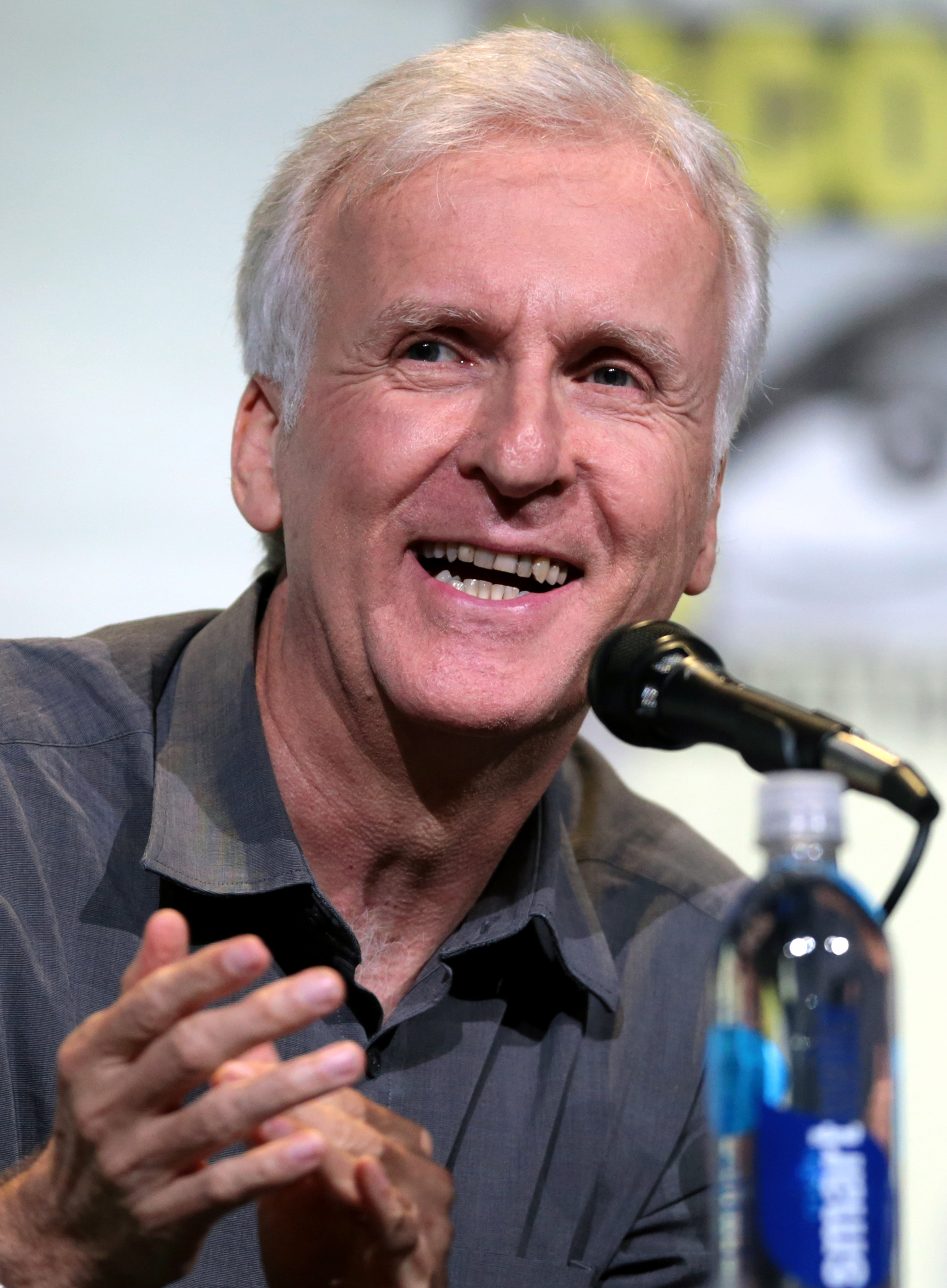
James Cameron (pictured in 2016) cited Princess Mononoke as an influence on his science fiction film Avatar (2009).

According to Napier, the film is commonly considered to be Miyazaki's most significant feature film. She wrote that it marked a "new chapter" in his filmography on account of its nuanced and intermingled themes and the unprecedented scope of its production. The film was longer and more expensive to produce than any Studio Ghibli film up to that point, which Napier reported induced a high level of stress and demanded "almost superhuman efforts" from the entire staff, including Miyazaki. Some senior employees, worn out from the film's production, left Studio Ghibli in its aftermath, with Miyazaki himself increasingly withdrawing from public relations. Suzuki recounted that Miyazaki was overtaxed from supervising the storyboards, music, and vocal recordings and had "given his body and soul" to the production. In an interview before the film's release, Miyazaki said that, "Physically, I just can't go on." He resigned in 1998 but returned shortly after to direct Spirited Away (2001) following the death of Yoshifumi Kondō, who was intended to be Miyazaki's successor at Studio Ghibli.

Princess Mononoke was the first film in which Miyazaki directly referenced scholarly writing, which strongly contributed to his status in Japanese society as a bunkajin and marked his works out for further academic inquiry. Alongside Neon Genesis Evangelion (1995–1996), the film laid the foundation for anime to become the subject of study by academics and critics. Yoshioka suggested that Miyazaki's growing reputation may have constrained his later creations – as he never wrote a feature film in the style of his earlier action-adventure works after Princess Mononoke – and motivated him to retire from the public eye. McCarthy, however, felt that the film provides a novel view of femininity that allows the female characters to express themselves without needing comparison to the men but writes that Miyazaki "opened the gates of this marvelous possibility" only to revert to traditional storytelling and character archetypes in later films.

Yoshioka felt the film's widespread success turned Miyazaki into an "icon of contemporary Japanese cinema" on the international stage and primed many of his subsequent works to become commercial successes in turn. It has since become a cult film due to its sustained popularity among fans, and Pett wrote that the film is now an "established cultural touchstone", identifying multiple other works that it had influenced. James Cameron, for example, cited the film as an influence on his science fiction film Avatar (2009). Critics have also named a number of video games that take influence from the film, including Ori and the Blind Forest (2015) and The Legend of Zelda: Breath of the Wild (2017). Pett identified a shift in critical writings that reinterpreted San as a feminist figure. In April 2013, Studio Ghibli partnered with the English production company Whole Hog Theatre to create a stage adaptation of the film. It premiered at the New Diorama Theatre in London after selling out a year ahead of time and moved to Tokyo later that year. In 2025, a newly discovered species of deepwater tilefish was named Branchiostegus sanae after the character San.
