= Nagaharu =

- Gender: Male

Origin
- Origin: Japanese
- Meaning: Different meanings depending on the kanji used

Nagaharu (written: 長治) is a masculine Japanese given name. Notable people with the name include:

- Bessho Nagaharu (別所 長治; 1558–1580), Japanese daimyō and samurai
- Nagaharu Yodogawa (淀川 長治; 1909–1998), Japanese film critic and television personality
