= Elan d'or Award Special Prize =

- Awarded for: Special Prize
- Country: Japan
- Presented by: All Nippon Producers Association
- First award: 1972
- Final award: 2014
- Website: www.producer.or.jp/elandor.html

The Elan d'or Award Special Prize is an award presented at the Elan d'or Awards in Japan. This award was first presented in 1972, and was discontinued after 2014.

Year	Awardee	Note
1972	Masahiro Shinoda; Producers of the film Silence	
1973	Yoji Yamada	
1974	Hideki Takahashi; Etsuko Takano	
1975	N/A	
1976	N/A	
1977	Kiyoshi Atsumi; Bunta Sugawara; Producers and staff of the film Rokuwa no Kamome	
1978	Shinobu Hashimoto; Ken Takakura; NHK Special documentary program Nihon no Sengo; TBS Special Program Umi wa Yomigaeru	
1979	Hashizo Okawa; NHK drama Ningen Moyō	
1980	Taichi Yamada; Keiko Kishi; Toshiba Nichiyō Gekijō staff; Masao Minami; Junjirō Yamada	
1981	Tatsuya Nakadai; Eijirō Tōno; Akira Hayasaka	
1982	Chieko Baisho; Sō Kuramoto; NTV detective drama Taiyō ni Hoero! staff	
1983	Seichō Matsumoto; Keiko Matsuzaka; NHK junior high school drama Chūgakusei Nikki staff	
1984	Shohei Imamura; Koreyoshi Kurahara; Sugako Hashida; Daishirō Miura	
1985	Hisaya Morishige; Mitsuko Mori	
1986	Takeshi Kitano; Kon Ichikawa; New Century Producers	
1987	Yoshiko Mita; Masaru Kakutani; Matsuo Takahashi	
1988	Kaneto Shindo; Miki James	
1989	Sayuri Yoshinaga; Seiken Tamukai	
1990	Hayao Miyazaki; Keiichiro Ryu (Ichirō Ikeda)	
1991	Genjiro Arato; Tatsurō Ishida	
1992	Nagaharu Yodogawa; Takeshi Kitano; The staff of the film Sensō to Seishun	
1993	Sugako Hashida; Juzo Itami; Naomi Fujiyama; Shirō Sano	
1994	Sumiko Haneda; TBS drama Kōkō Kyōshi staff; Atsuo Nakamura; Hisao Masuda; Chishū Ryū	
1995	Kazuo Hara; Yōichi Komatsuzawa; NHK Hiroshima station; Kinichi Hagimoto	
1996	Kaneto Shindo; Nobuko Otowa; Frankie Sakai; Yumi Adachi; Tomiko Miyao; Tetsuo Takaha	
1997	Kiyoshi Atsumi; Naoto Takenaka; NHK drama Daichi no Ko production staff	
1998	Princess Mononoke production staff; Mansai Nomura; Junichi Watanabe; Shohei Imamura	
1999	Takeshi Kaneshiro; Takeshi Kitano; Tōkai Television Broadcasting Drama production staff; NTV drama Kayō Suspense Gekijō production staff; Akira Kurosawa; Nagaharu Yodogawa; Keisuke Kimura	
2000	Tsuguhiko Kadokawa; Tamao Nakamura; Utaemon Ichikawa	
2001	Yasuyoshi Tokuma; Drama Kanebō Human Special	
2002	Takerō Itō; Kazuki Enari; Kōji Shundō; Shinji Sōmai; Tomi Taira; Yoshinobu Nishioka	
2003	Kaneto Shindo; Saho Sasazawa; Kinji Fukasaku	
2004	Yumiko Inoue; Seitan 100-nen Ozu Yasujirō Tokusū; TV Asahi drama Doyō Wide Gekijō; Kyotaro Nishimura; TBS period drama Mito Kōmon	
2005	Kazuo Kuroki; Masahiko Kobayashi; Hisashi Nozawa	
2006	Mitsuko Mori; Kihachi Production; Densha Otoko; Naoyuki Suzuki; Yoshitarō Nomura	
2007	Teruhiko Kuze; Akio Jissoji; Fuji TV drama Nodame Cantabile	
2008	Hitoshi Ueki; Staff of the film Koizora; TV Tokyo Shinshun Wide Jidaigeki series production staff; TBS drama Karei-naru Ichizoku production staff	
2009	Kon Ichikawa; Ken Ogata; TV Asahi and Toei Kamen Rider Series production staff; TBS drama Wataru Seken wa Oni Bakari production staff	
2010	Daisaku Kimura; Hisaya Morishige; Staff and production team of the film Tsuribaka Nisshi; TV Asahi drama Keiji Ichidai Hiratsuka Hachibē no Shōwa Jikenshi production team	
2011	Shinobu Terajima; NHK drama GeGeGe no Nyōbō production team	
2012	TV Asahi drama Aibō production team; TBS drama Kinpachi-sensei production team; Taiga drama 50	
2013	TV Asahi Doyō Wide Gekijō 35th anniversary	
2014	NHK drama Amachan production team	
