= Elan d'or Award for Best Work =

Award given at the Elan d'or Awards in Japan

Elan d'Or Award for Best Work
- Awarded for: Best Work
- Country: Japan
- Presented by: All Nippon Producers Association
- First award: 2001
- Final award: 2011
- Website: www.producer.or.jp/elandor.html

The Elan d'or Award for Best Work is an award given at the Elan d'or Awards in Japan. It was first presented in 2001, and was discontinued after 2011. This award is given to the best film and TV drama through the year.

Year	Film category	TV category	Note
2001	15-Sai Gakko IV	Beautiful Life	
2002	Spirited Away	Hero	
2003	The Twilight Samurai	Kita no Kuni Kara 2002 Yuigon	
2004	Bayside Shakedown 2	Ruten no Ouhi Saigo no Kōtei	
2005	Crying Out Love in the Center of the World	Shiroi Kyotō	
2006	Always Sanchōme no Yūhi	Gokusen	
2007	Hula Girls	Kōmyō ga Tsuji	
2008	I Just Didn't Do It	Hagetaka	
2009	Departures	Atsuhime	
2010	Shizumanu Taiyō	Tenchijin	
2011	Confessions	Ryōmaden	
