= Steve Alpert =

American film executive

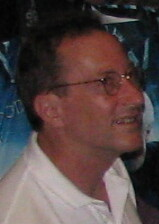
Alpert at San Diego Comic-Con in 2009

Stephen M. Alpert (born 1949 or 1950) is a former senior executive at Studio Ghibli. He published a memoir detailing his work in the studio in 2020.

== Biography ==
Stephen M. Alpert was born in 1949 or 1950. A native of the state of Connecticut in the United States, he partially lived in Japan from 1974 to 1979, mostly in Kyoto and partly in Tokyo. In 1976, he started studying Japanese literature under Donald Keene at Columbia University, and earned his Master of Business Administration in 1981. He worked for Citibank in Tokyo as a vice president before serving as the president of Walt Disney Studios's Japanese television animation arm.

Alpert later worked with Studio Ghibli, including as part of its parent company Tokuma International, for 15 years between 1996 and 2011 as a senior executive, heading their international department and acting as their spokesperson with foreign third parties during that time. He represented the studio in negotiations with Disney and Miramax Films. During the production of the English dub of Princess Mononoke (1997), Alpert assisted Neil Gaiman with the translation of the script. Alpert returned to New Haven, Connecticut, in 2012, after leaving Studio Ghibli.

In 2020, Alpert published Sharing a House with the Never-Ending Man, a memoir about his co-residence with Studio Ghibli's Hayao Miyazaki and experiences working at the animation studio. The cover features Castorp, a character from The Wind Rises (2013) based on and voiced by Alpert. It was originally published in 2016 as a Japanese-language edition titled I Am a Gaijin: The Man Who Sold Ghibli to the World. (Note: Japanese: 吾輩はガイジンである: ジブリを世界に売った男, Hepburn: Wagahai wa gaijin de aru: Jiburi wo sekai ni utta otoko. Gaijin is a Japanese word referring to foreigners.) Stone Bridge Press published the English version and included it in a bundle on Japanese culture in 2022.

Tokyo Weekender's Nick Narigon felt that the book "humanizes" Miyazaki, a divergence from other accounts of that focus on his "eccentricities and notoriously demanding work ethic." Andrew Osmond, reviewing for Anime News Network, appreciated the comedic anecdotes featured in the book and found the prose in between "dry, but still hugely enlightening." Publishers Weekly, however, wrote that the book's "workmanlike" writing would more easily attract an audience of foreign immigrants in Japan than fans of Studio Ghibli works.

In 2022, Stone Bridge Press published Alpert's novel Kyoto Stories, a series of connected stories following an American student in Kyoto in the 1970s.

== Selected bibliography ==
- ——— (2020). Sharing a House with the Never-Ending Man: 15 Years at Studio Ghibli. Stone Bridge Press. ISBN 978-1-6117-2057-0.
- ——— (2022). Kyoto Stories. Stone Bridge Press. ISBN 978-1-6117-2074-7.
