= Elan d'or Association Award =

Japanese media industry award

- Country: Japan
- Presented by: All Nippon Producers Association
- First award: 1961
- Final award: 1993
- Website: www.producer.or.jp/elandor.html

The Elan d'or Association Award is an award that is presented annually at the Elan d'or Awards in Japan to recognize outstanding achievements in domestic motion pictures and television, established in 1961. In 1994, it was renamed to the Producer Award.

Year	Producer(s)	Note
1961	Masaichi Nagata and Daiei staff for the 70 mm film Shaka	
1962	Kaneto Shindo and Kindai Eiga Kyokai staff for the film The Naked Island and Ningen	
1963	N/A	
1964	N/A	
1965	Iwao Mori	
1966	N/A	
1967	N/A	
1968	Taneo Izeki; The Sands of Kurobe production staff; Kinnosuke Nakamura for the film Gion Matsuri	
1969	N/A	
1970	N/A	
1971	N/A	
1972	N/A	
1973	Fukuko Ishii; Takeshi Yamamoto	
1974	Tokuko Miyako; Kano Ōtsuka; Yasushi Takeda	
1975	Tomoyuki Tanaka; Masayuki Satō	
1976	Takerō Itō; Takeo Yanagawa	
1977	Hideyuki Ishino	
1978	Haruki Kadokawa	
1979	N/A	
1980	Katsumi Ōyama	
1981	Ichirō Satō; Hajime Ishikawa; Ben Wada	
1982	Yoshihiko Muraki; Shigeki Sugiyama; Hirokichi Okada	
1983	Yasuyoshi Tokuma; Susumu Kondō	
1984	Juichi Tanaka; Akio Miyatake	
1985	Kiyoshi Shimazu; Yoshinobu Numano; Tengo Yamada	
1986	Masato Hara; Masaya Araki	
1987	Mitsuru Kurosawa; Satoru Saitō; Hidenori Taga; Tonkō Horikawa	
1988	Seiichirō Eida	
1989	Eiichi Imado; Yasuyoshi Tokuma	
1990	Yawara Adachi; Katsumi Ōyama; Yukiko Okamoto	
1991	Masaya Araki; Shigemichi Sugita	
1992	Mikio Kawaguchi; Yutaka Okada; Yoshiaki Yamada; Hisao Ichikawa	
1993	Hideo Gosha; Kazuyoshi Okuyama; Yoshinori Watanabe; Noboru Tsuburaya	
