= Sannomiya =

Area of Kobe, Hyōgo Prefecture, Japan

Coordinates: 34°41′36.7″N 135°11′42.2″E

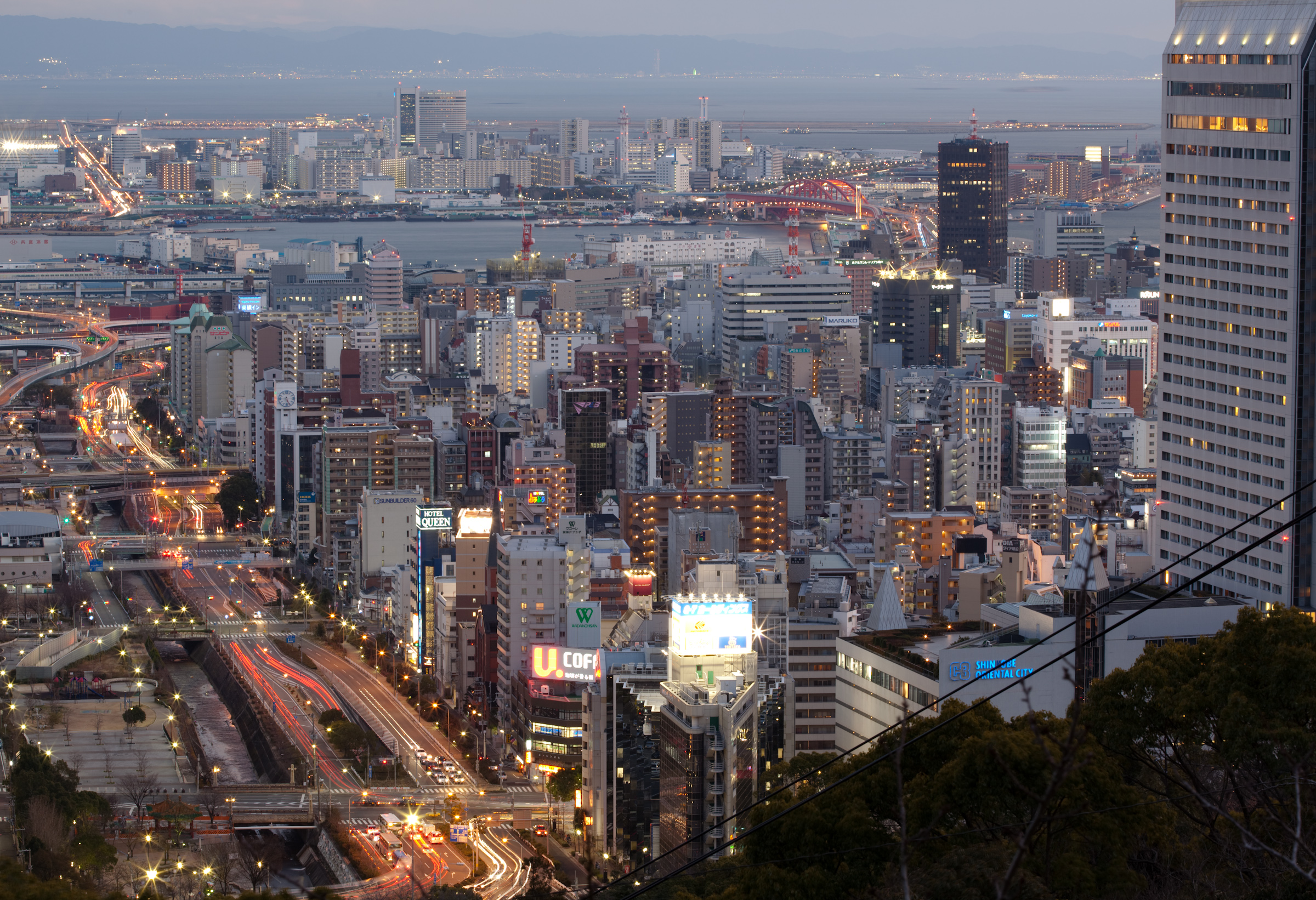
A Sannomiya view from Shin-Kobe

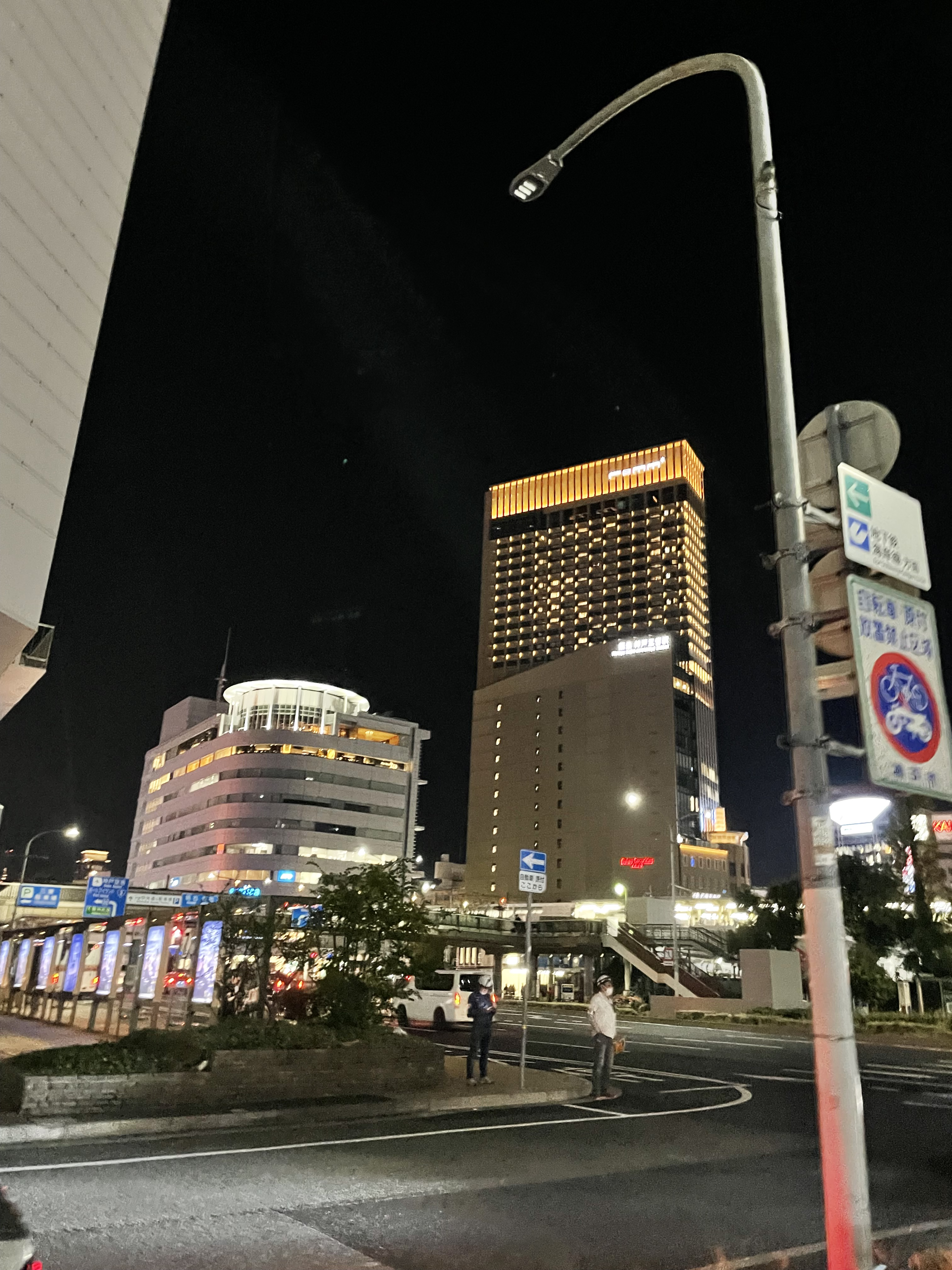
View of Sannomiya station at night

Sannomiya (三宮) is a district of Chūō-ku, Kobe-shi, Hyōgo Prefecture, Japan. Sannomiya serves as the financial, commercial, and the entertainment center of Kobe. The district takes the name from Sannomiya Shrine, a branch of Ikuta Shrine.

Before the 1920s, Sannomiya was just a small suburb of the city. The major suburbs were Motomachi and Shinkaichi which are west of Sannomiya. In 1933, the Sogo Department Store moved from Motomachi to premises in front of Sannomiya Station. The area started to develop rapidly.

Sannomiya is also the hub for most of the transportation systems in Kobe. JR West, Hankyu Railway, Hanshin Electric Railway, Kobe Municipal Subway and Kobe New Transit use Kobe-Sannomiya Station as their primary station in the area. The Kobe Incident in 1868 occurred in this suburb in front of the Sannomiya Shrine.

== In popular culture ==
The 1988 Studio Ghibli film Grave of the Fireflies uses the station as its opening and closing location. At the end of the film it depicts the arrival of the first Americans in Kobe after the end of World War II.

Ikuta Road at night, Sannomiya, Kobe

== See also ==
- Daimaru Kobe (diagonally in front of the above-mentioned Sannomiya Shrine)
- Kobe-Sannomiya Station (Hankyu, Hanshin, Kobe Municipal Subway, Kobe New Transit)
- Sannomiya Station (JR West)
