= Elan d'or Awards =

Award

- Awarded for: outstanding achievements in domestic motion pictures and television
- Country: Japan
- Presented by: All Nippon Producers Association
- First award: 1956
- Website: http://www.producer.or.jp/elandor/elandor-01.htm

The Elan d'or Awards (エランドール賞, Erandōru Shō) are awards presented annually by the All Nippon Producers Association (ANPA) in Japan to recognize achievements in domestic motion pictures and television.

The first ceremony was held in 1956. Up until 1960, the Elan d'or Awards focused on only the Newcomer of the Year category. The other five categories were officially added in 2001.

The 2020 awards were held on 17 January 2020.

== Categories ==
Awards are presented in the following categories.

- Newcomer of the Year
- Best Work
- Elan d'or Association Award
- Best Producer
- Special Prize

== See also ==
- List of Asian television awards
