= Nagaharu Yodogawa =

Japanese film critic

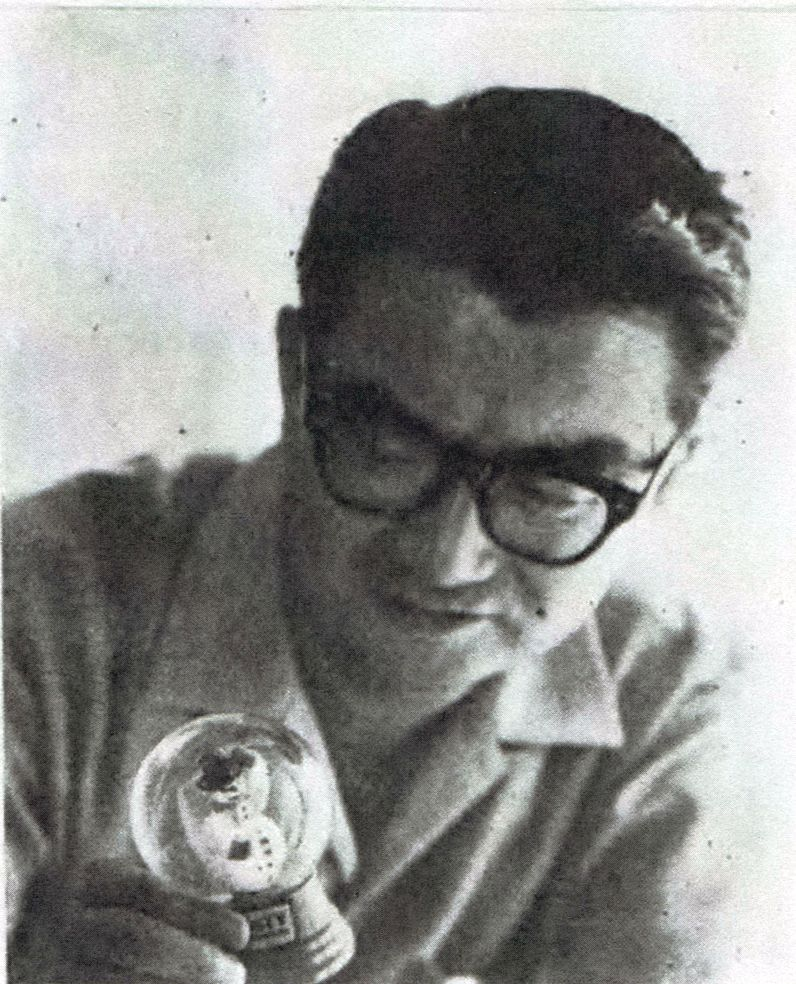
- Nagaharu Yodogawa in 1961.
- Born: April 10, 1909; Kobe, Japan
- Died: November 11, 1998 (aged 89); Tokyo, Japan
- Occupations: Film critic, historian, television personality

Nagaharu Yodogawa (淀川 長治, Yodogawa Nagaharu; April 10, 1909, Kobe, Japan – November 11, 1998, Tokyo) was a Japanese film critic, historian, and television personality. Members of both the Japanese and foreign press have referred to him as the "giant of film critiques", a "cultural institution", as well as "Japan's most famous movie critic".

== Early life ==
Yodogawa was born in Kobe and grew up in his father's geisha agency in the Shinkaichi entertainment district, along with his brother and two sisters. His family were regular movie-goers, visiting the cinema several times a week. Yodogawa began accompanying his family at age four. By the age of seven he proved himself to be a budding cinemaphile; he would often go to the movies on his own, seeing as many as ten films in one week.

== Career in film criticism ==
Upon graduating from Kobe High School, Yodogawa started his journalistic career working for the magazine Eiga Sekai (Movie World). After World War II he became Chief Editor of Eiga no Tomo (Film Friend), a post he held for twenty years.

After his tenure at Eiga no Tomo, Yodogawa went on to do freelance work in radio, television and print, all in relation to film. In 1962 he began working at TV Asahi as the host of Sunday Western Movie Theatre, a job to which he was so devoted that he did not miss a single appearance until just a week before his death in 1998. During his three decades as the show's host, he interviewed film stars "ranging from Charlie Chaplin to Steven Seagal". He is also known for closing each show with his signature line, "Sayonara, sayonara, sayonara".

== Love of film ==
Yodogawa's first love was silent film. He preferred silent movies over sound film because he felt that silent films depicted real life and were easy to understand, even without Japanese captions.

Over his career, Yodogawa became increasingly critical of modern Japanese film. He once stated, "It is because I love film so much that I hate those incompetent and uninteresting new movies." In contrast, he believed that even the worst movies were worth watching; he felt that all films had at least one redeeming feature, such as a well-composed shot. Near the end of his life he did however show interest in the new style of film-making of Takeshi Kitano, to whom he referred as "the true successor to Kurosawa".

== Influence ==
Yodogawa's appreciation of film is notable amongst the film industry of Japan. Fellow critic and scholar Shigehiko Hasumi once said, "We usually watch films with the intellect, but Yodogawa watched them with every fibre of his being." The award-winning actor Hiroyuki Sanada also credited Yodogawa with having introduced him to foreign movies.

In 1991, the Yodogawa Nagaharu Award, sponsored by Road Show Magazine (Japan), was created to commemorate the film critic. The award is presented to a person or group who contributed greatly to the Japanese film industry in the preceding year. In 2005, Jackie Chan became the first non-Japanese recipient of the award.

== Final years ==
Yodogawa lived the last years of his life in the Zen Nikku Hotel in Tokyo (now ANA InterContinental Tokyo), where he paid for his room in cash every ten days. He continued working as the host of Sunday Western Movie Theatre until just weeks before his death.

Nagaharu Yodogawa died November 11, 1998, of heart failure. Yodogawa Nagaharu monogatari - Kobe-hen: Sainara, a biographical film depicting his life, directed by Nobuhiko Obayashi, was released the following year.

== Partial bibliography ==
- Yodogawa, Nagaharu (1987). Eiga no michi, Jinsei no michi. 350 pages. ISBN 4-8261-0707-2.
- Yodogawa, Nagaharu (1987). Rekishi wa eiga de tsukurareru. 334 pages. ISBN 4-8261-0705-6.
- Yodogawa, Nagaharu (1987). Watakushi no eiga no jikan: Tabi to zatsugaku. 318 pages. ISBN 4-8261-0706-4.
- Yodogawa, Nagaharu (1988). Eiga sen'ya ichiya. 796 pages. ISBN 4-12-001696-X.
- Yodogawa, Nagaharu (1990). Shine kurabu jidai: Atene furanse bunka sentā tōku sesshon = L'Age du cine-club. 348 pages. ISBN 4-8459-9087-3.
- Yodogawa, Nagaharu (1991). Eiga. 261 pages. ISBN 4-87893-825-0.
- Yodogawa, Nagaharu (1993). Waga eiga jinsei ni kui nashi. 170 pages. ISBN 4-537-05021-7.
- Yodogawa, Nagaharu (1999). Saigo no sayonara sayonara sayonara. 334 pages. ISBN 4-08-780294-9.
- Yodogawa, Nagaharu (1999). Kurosawa Akira o kataru = Yodogawa Nagaharu talks about Kurosawa Akira. 253 pages. ISBN 4-309-26379-8.
- Yodogawa, Nagaharu (1999). Eiga wa kataru. 509 pages. ISBN 4-12-002889-5.
