= Shinkaichi =

District of Kobe, Japan

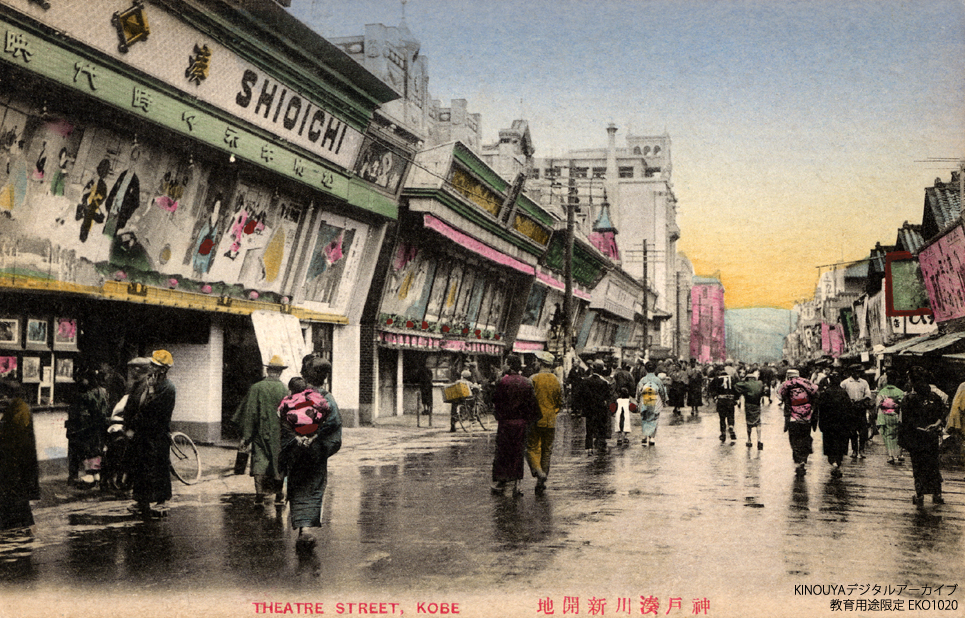
Hand tint postcard of Shinkaichi

Shinkaichi (新開地, Shinkaichi) is a district of Kobe, Japan. It is one of the major downtown areas in the city.

The name Shinkaichi means "newly opened area". It was named so because the district was newly developed after moving the Minato-gawa (river) from this area to the west end of the city in the early 20th century. Before World War II and the air raid on Kobe by the Allied forces in 1945, this district was the largest section of downtown Kobe.

From the 1920s to the 1940s, this district was also famous as a "town of theaters". However, after such theaters lost their popularity during the 1960s, this district rapidly lost its status.

== Transportation ==
Shinkaichi Station of Kobe Rapid Transit Railway is in Shinkaichi. It is the terminal of the trains of Kobe Electric Railway and is also served by Hankyu, Hanshin and Sanyo trains.
