= Professor Risley and the Imperial Japanese Troupe =

2012 non-fiction work by Frederik L. Schodt

- Professor Risley and the Imperial Japanese Troupe
- Author: Frederik L. Schodt
- Language: English
- Genre: Nonfiction
- Publisher: Stone Bridge Press
- Publication date: November 2012
- Pages: 336 pp
- ISBN: 978-1-61172-009-9

Professor Risley and the Imperial Japanese Troupe is a 2012 nonfiction book written by Frederik L. Schodt, author of Dreamland Japan and Manga! Manga!, and published by Stone Bridge Press. It traces the history of American acrobat and impresario "Professor" Risley (Richard Risley Carlisle) and his attempts in the 19th century at bringing the West its first glimpse of Japanese popular entertainment. The Risley act is also named after Professor Risley.

== Table of contents ==
- Setting the Stage
- The Risley Act
- Going for Gold
- Into Asia
- Yokohama, Japan
- Taking America
- At the Exposition
- The Long Way to London
- The Matter of the Contract
- Final Acts

== Reception ==
After the book's release in 2012, it gained favorable reviews in the press. Kris Kosaka of The Japan Times said, "Schodt takes us all around the world of 19th-century entertainment: the competition, the disdain, the copycats and the triumphs. It's a captivating story about a pioneer in international entertainment." And the Midwest Book Review said it is "an intriguing look at international relations, culture, the circus, and its effects on the modern day," and "a must for anyone seeking an original and offbeat take on history".
