= Dafydd Fell =

British political scientist

Dafydd J. Fell (born 14 May 1970) is a British political scientist who has written extensively on the politics of Taiwan. He is a professor of comparative politics and the director of the Center of Taiwan Studies (CTS) at the School of Oriental and African Studies (SOAS), University of London. Fell is the convenor of the MA Taiwan Studies programme of the SOAS. Under his direction, this school's Taiwan-related courses, conferences and publications on Taiwan increased. He is the book series editor for the Routledge Research on Taiwan Series and an editor of International Journal of Taiwan Studies.

== Biography ==
In 1992, Fell graduated from the University of Leeds with a bachelor's degree in Chinese Studies. When he was an undergraduate, from 1989 to 1990, Fell learned Chinese language at National Chengchi University in Taipei, Taiwan. After graduating, he spent most of the 1990s working in Taiwan.

In 1999, Fell joined the SOAS Politics Department as a doctoral student and has been teaching there since 2003.

From 2003 to 2012, Fell was a senior lecturer.

In 2004, Fell participated in establishing the European Association of Taiwan Studies.

From 2012 to 2022, he was a Reader.

Since September 2022, he has been a professor.

Fell has a Chinese name, 羅達菲 (Luo Dafei).

== Works ==
=== Monographs ===
- Party Politics in Taiwan (Routledge, 2005)
- Government and Politics in Taiwan (Routledge, 2011)
- Government and Politics in Taiwan, Second Edition. (Routledge, 2018)
- Taiwan's Green Parties (Routledge 2021)

=== Edited books ===
- What Has Changed? Taiwan Before and After the Change in Ruling Parties (2006)
- Politics of Modern Taiwan (2008)
- Migration to and From Taiwan (2014)
- Taiwan's Social Movements under Ma Ying-jeou (2017)
- Taiwan Studies Revisited (2019)
- Taiwan's Economic and Diplomatic Challenges and Opportunities (2021)
- Taiwan's Contemporary Indigenous Peoples (2021)
- The Twilight Years of Taiwan’s Sugar Railways: The World's Most Extraordinary Industrial Railway (2026)

=== Journal articles ===
Fell has published numerous articles on academic journals such as American Journal of Chinese Studies, Asian Journal of Political Science, Asian Politics and Policy, Asian Survey, Harvard Asia Pacific Review, International Migration, Journal of Current Chinese Affairs, Journal of East Asian Studies, Parliamentary Affairs, Taiwan Journal of Democracy and The China Quarterly.

Selected Articles

- Fell, D. (2016). "Small Parties in Taiwan's 2016 National Elections: A Limited Breakthrough?". American Journal of Chinese Studies, 23(1), 41–58.
- Fell, D., & Cheng, I. (2014). "The Change of Ruling Parties and Taiwan's Claim to Multiculturalism before and after 2008". Journal of Current Chinese Affairs, 43(3), 71–103.
- Fell, D. (2010). "Taiwan's Democracy: Towards a Liberal Democracy or Authoritarianism?". Journal of Current Chinese Affairs, 39(2), 187–201.
- Fell, D. (2006). "Democratisation of Candidate Selection in Taiwanese Political Parties". Journal of Electoral Studies, 13(2), 167–198.
- Fell, D. (2005). "Political and Media Liberalization and Political Corruption in Taiwan" (PDF). The China Quarterly. 184: 893. Archived from the original (PDF) on 2024-09-15 – via SOAS Research Online.
