= The Osamu Tezuka Story: A Life in Manga and Anime =

1989–1992 manga by Toshio Ban

- Cover art for the English release

手塚治虫物語 (Tezuka Osamu Monogatari)
- Genre: Biography
- Manga
- Written by: Toshio Ban
- Published by: Asahi Shimbun Company
- English publisher: NA: Stone Bridge Press
- Magazine: Asahi Graph
- Original run: 1989 – 1992
- Volumes: 2

The Osamu Tezuka Story: A Life in Manga and Anime (Japanese: 手塚治虫物語, Hepburn: Tezuka Osamu Monogatari) is a biographical manga based on Osamu Tezuka's life, created by Tezuka Productions and Tezuka's assistant Toshio Ban. It was serialized by Asahi Shimbun's Asahi Graph from 1989 to 1992 and collected into two volumes in 1992. It was published in North America by Stone Bridge Press, with a translation by Frederik L. Schodt, on July 12, 2016. The North American edition was nominated for the 2017 Eisner Award in the "Best U.S. Edition of International Material—Asia" category.

== Synopsis ==
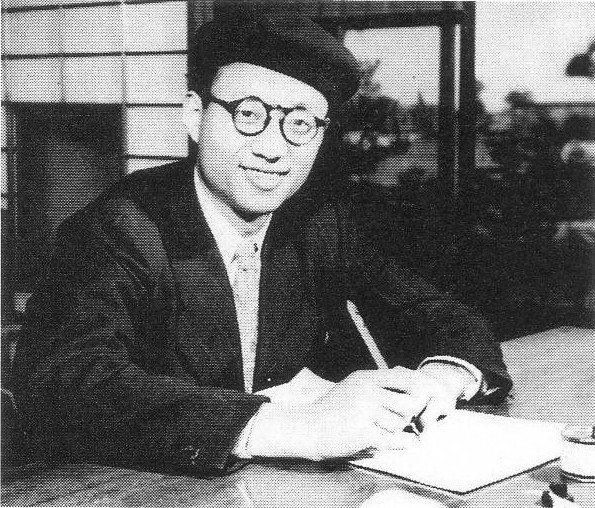
Tezuka in 1951

The manga is a biography of Osamu Tezuka, covering Tezuka's life and career, and the evolution of the manga and anime industries in Japan.

== Production and release ==
The Osamu Tezuka Story was created by Tezuka Productions and Toshio Ban, who was one of Tezuka's assistants and the sub-chief of manga productions for magazines at Tezuka Productions. The manga was serialized in the news magazine Asahi Graph of Asahi Shimbun Company following Tezuka's death from 1989 to 1992. Asahi Shimbun collected the manga into two volumes in 1992, covering the time periods 1928–1959 and 1960–1989, respectively. Kin no Hoshisha republished the manga in three volumes in 2009. It was published in a single volume in North America on July 12, 2016, by Stone Bridge Press, with an English translation by Frederik L. Schodt. The manga has also been published in France by Casterman in four volumes under the title Osamu Tezuka – Biographie.

== Reception ==
The Osamu Tezuka Story was nominated for the 2017 Eisner Award in the "Best U.S. Edition of International Material—Asia" category.
