= Anime UK =

Defunct British magazine about Japanese animation

Anime UK was a British magazine founded in 1991 dedicated to Japanese animation and published for six years before ceasing publication in 1996. Peter Goll, Steve Kyte, Helen McCarthy, and Wil Overton founded the magazine in London. Published for six years, it was sold worldwide and was widely admired for its innovative design, high production standards and varied, entertaining content. Its stated aims were to make the then arcane and unknown world of Japanese animation accessible to non-Japanese speakers, and to promote a positive and open image for a medium that received some negative press during its early years in the U.K.

== History ==
The magazine grew out of Anime UK newsletter, a fan publication started after the 1990 Eastercon (the British National Science Fiction Convention). Overton, one of the early subscribers, took the newsletter to his boss Goll, who offered to fund and publish a magazine devoted to anime through his company, Sigma. McCarthy was the magazine's editor throughout its run. Overton and Kyte were designers and house artists.

To re-create the visual excitement of a Japanese anime magazine, the team dreamed up features such as Kyte's A–Z of anime in pullout form so it could be carried in a pocket for reference, paper dolls of well known anime characters, postcards and folding desk calendars. One unexpected hit was Ah Oishii! (Ah, delicious!), a simple recipe illustrated with anime characters. Printed on the inside back cover so it could be cut out and filed, it was so popular with readers that many submitted their own recipes and art, and it ran until the magazine folded.

A number of the writers and artists who worked for the magazine have achieved greater success elsewhere, including authors Jonathan Clements (the magazine's staff translator), Peter J. Evans and James Swallow. Contributors from Europe, America and Japan included Frederik L. Schodt, translator and author of the seminal Manga! Manga! The World of Japanese Comics, and anime and manga historian Fred Patten.

In glossy, full-colour card covers, the magazine progressed from a bi-monthly publication with partial colour to a monthly, and eventually to full colour, although a dispute over editorial policy with Andy Frain of Manga Entertainment resulted in no paid advertising from the then-biggest UK anime retailer. In early 1995, in a move by Goll to secure better financing, the magazine was re-launched as a professional high-street monthly publication with new numbering. The magazine's name was changed to Anime FX and was published by Ashdown Publishing, with the same editorial and design team and from the same offices in Mortimer Street, London W1.

It ceased publishing in February 1996, leaving many contributors unpaid for the last few issues. Many contributors subsequently moved on to the UK's only other contemporary anime magazine, Manga Mania. By the time of the magazine's cancellation, Andy Frain had left Manga Entertainment and their promotional material was finally sent to the Anime FX offices, too late to be included in the final issue.

== See also ==
- K.O. Beast
- List of manga magazines published outside Japan
