= The Anime Encyclopedia =

2001 encyclopedia by Jonathan Clements and Helen McCarthy

The Anime Encyclopedia: A Guide to Japanese Animation Since 1917
- Front cover of second edition with Astro Boy, an early example of modern anime style
- Author: Jonathan Clements; Helen McCarthy
- Language: English
- Subject: Anime
- Genre: Encyclopedia
- Publisher: Stone Bridge Press; Titan Books
- Publication date: 2001
- Publication place: United States; United Kingdom
- Media type: Print paperback (first and second editions); hardcover, ebook (third edition)
- Pages: xviii + 545 pp (first edition); xxiv + 867 pp (second edition); xxiv + 1136 pp (third edition)
- ISBN: 978-1-611720-18-1 3rd ed.
- OCLC: 897946457

The Anime Encyclopedia: A Guide to Japanese Animation Since 1917 is a 2001 encyclopedia written by Jonathan Clements and Helen McCarthy. It was published in 2001 by Stone Bridge Press in the United States, and a "revised and expanded" edition was released in 2006. In the United Kingdom, it was published by Titan Books. The third edition was released in 2015 with the subtitle of A Century of Japanese Animation. It gives an overview of most of the famous anime works since 1917.

== Reception ==
Anime News Network's George Phillips commended the encyclopedia for "in-depth analysis of several major series, and discussions on hundreds of anime series rarely (if ever) heard of in the West" but criticized it for titles that "aren't listed under the names you suspect; can be quite confusing at first" though "the appendix in the back lists every title, including the Japanese and alternate English titles". Animation World Network's Fred Patten commented on the book being "300 pages larger; a 40% expansion" in its "Revised and Expanded" edition compared to the original volume. He commended it for being "designed for all readers; laymen and experts (fans and academicians) alike". Animefringe's Ridwan Khan commended the book for having "the entries summarize the plot, offer an opinion, and often discuss points of interest, including similar anime or historical roots. Icons indicating the presence of bad language, nudity, and violence follow each entry. For many, including librarians, parents, and club leaders, this is potentially a very useful at-a-glance feature". Patrick Macias, editor in chief of Otaku USA magazine, writing in The Japan Times, reviewing the second edition, commented that "'Anime Encyclopedia' works best when it aims to stick to the facts, which it happily gets right more often than not" but "while Clements and McCarthy's mastery of Japanese culture, both high and low, is impressive, the authors sometimes stumble when [comparing Samurai Champloo to Pink Floyd's "The Wall"] they try to step outside their fields of expertise". Valerie MacEwan commended the book saying that "only the most ardent aficionado of anime would find this volume lacking in detail. [It is] easy to use, fully indexed and cross-referenced with titles in Japanese and English". Sarah of Anime UK News said: "Where Jonathan Clements and Helen McCarthy really come into their own is the way they trace the influence of earlier shows that most of us have never seen". She noted that while the entries are not rated with a star system, Clement's and McCarthy's "descriptions can betray personal preferences which may not coincide with the reader's".
