= Kusakabe =

Kusakabe (written: 草壁 or 日下部) is a Japanese surname. Notable people with the surname include:

- Prince Kusakabe (草壁 皇子), prince of Japan
- Kie Kusakabe (日下部 基栄), Japanese judoka
- Kusakabe Kimbei (日下部 金幣), 19th-century Japanese photographer
- Yolanda Kusakabe, Japanese-Italian pianist

== Fictional characters ==
- Atsuya Kusakabe (日下部篤也), a character in the manga and anime series Jujutsu Kaisen
- Maron Kusakabe (日下部 まろん), a character in Kamikaze Kaito Jeanne
- Misao Kusakabe (日下部 みさお), a character in the manga series Lucky Star
- Misuzu Kusakabe (草壁 美鈴), a character in 11eyes
- Satsuki Kusakabe (草壁 サツキ) and Mei Kusakabe (草壁 メイ), characters in the film My Neighbor Totoro
- Shinra Kusakabe (森羅 日下部), protagonist of the manga series Fire Force

== See also ==
- Kusakabe clan (日下部氏, Kusakabe-shi), Japanese clan
