= Joel S. Fetzer =

American political scientist

- Born: November 13, 1965 (age 60)
- Board member of: American Association for Chinese Studies
- Awards: Society for the Scientific Study of Religion's Distinguished Book Award (2020)

Academic background
- Education: Yale University (Ph.D.); Cornell University (A.B.)
- Thesis: National borders/cultural boundaries (1996)
- Doctoral advisor: Martin Gilens

Academic work
- Discipline: Political science
- Sub-discipline: Comparative politics
- Institutions: Pepperdine University; Central Michigan University; U.S. Department of Labor; Cadwalader, Wickersham & Taft
- Notable works: Religion and Nationalism in Global Perspective (2018)

Joel Steven Fetzer (born November 13, 1965) is an American political scientist best known for his pioneering work on comparative politics, nationalism, and democratization. He is a distinguished professor of political science at Pepperdine University.

== Life and work ==
=== Early life ===
Fetzer was born on November 13, 1965, in Jacksonville, Florida, to Christian parents. His father, a U.S. Naval intelligence officer, received orders to report to the Pentagon in Washington, D.C. and relocated the family to northern Virginia.

He attended Cornell University as an undergraduate where he wrote Selective Prosecution of Religiously Motivated Offenders in America: Scrutinizing the Myth of Neutrality. Fetzer matriculated at Yale University and completed his Doctor of Philosophy degree in 1996. He was awarded the Ebert Dissertation Fellowship from the Friedrich Ebert Foundation and the Peace Scholar Fellowship from the United States Institute of Peace.

His dissertation was published as Public Attitudes toward Immigration in the United States, France, and Germany in 2000. Fetzer taught at Central Michigan University from 1998 to 2000 then at Pepperdine University starting in 2001. He was coordinator of the political science department at Pepperdine from 2019 to 2022 and spent time as a visiting professor at the Centre for Interdisciplinary Research on Citizenship and Minorities (CIRCM) at University of Ottawa, the University of British Columbia, and the University of Luxembourg.

=== Research ===
Fetzer's book Religion and Nationalism in Global Perspective (2018), co-authored with Christopher Soper, explores the "resurgence of nationalism, usually populist, often religious, and all too often authoritarian" in the United States, Israel, India, Greece, Uruguay, and Malaysia and popularized the idea that the relationship between religion and nationalism for each and every nation in the world fits into one of three models: secular nationalism, religious nationalism, or civil-religious nationalism.

Fetzer and Soper, in the words of then President of the American Political Science Association (APSA) Rogers Smith, "produced a seminal theory of how and why religion and nationalism are related in distinct ways in different societies." Religion and Nationalism in Global Perspective was the first large-scale cross-national analysis undertaken to understand the emergence, development, and stability of different church-state arrangements over time. The research received the Society for the Scientific Study of Religion's Distinguished Book Award, which is given to the year's best book on the sociology of religion, in 2020.

=== Archives ===
The Fetzer's archives are maintained by Pepperdine University and the Online Archive of California (OAC).

== Publications ==
=== Books ===
- Public Attitudes toward Immigration in the United States, France, and Germany. Cambridge University Press. 2000. ISBN 9780521786799.
- Muslims and the State in Britain, France, and Germany. Cambridge University Press. 2005. ISBN 9780521535397.
- Luxembourg as an Immigration Success Story: The Grand Duchy in Pan-European Perspective. Lexington Books. 2011. ISBN 9780739128268.
- Confucianism, Democratization, and Human Rights in Taiwan. Lexington Books. 2012. ISBN 9780739173015.
- Open Borders and International Migration Policy: The Effects of Unrestricted Immigration in the United States, France, and Ireland. Palgrave Macmillan. 2015. ISBN 9781137513922.
- Religion and Nationalism in Global Perspective. Cambridge University Press. 2018. ISBN 9781107189430.
