= Leza Lowitz =

American writer (born 1962)

Leza Lowitz (born December 29, 1962, San Francisco) is an American expatriate writer residing in Tokyo, Japan and in the American Southwest. She has written, edited and co-translated over twenty books, many about Japan, its relationship with the US, on the changing role of Japanese women in literature, art and society, and about the lasting effect of the Second World War and the desire for reconciliation in contemporary Japanese society. She is also an internationally renown yoga and mindfulness teacher recognized for her work bridging poetry and the spiritual path through disciplines like yoga and mindfulness.

== Biography ==
Lowitz grew up in San Francisco and Berkeley, and attended Berkeley High School, from which she graduated in 1980. She was accepted into the first year of NYU's School of Dramatic Writing at age 18, and attended NYU for two years before transferring to U.C. Berkeley. She received her B.A. in English literature from the University of California at Berkeley in 1984 and her M.A. in creative writing from San Francisco State University in 1988, where she briefly taught before moving to Japan. She studied with poets Stan Rice and Robert Hass.

During the 1990s, Lowitz helped to bring many modern Japanese poets and fiction writers into English for the first time. She was editor and co-translator with Miyuki Aoyama and Akemi Tomioka of the groundbreaking anthology: A Long Rainy Season: Contemporary Japanese Women’s Poetry (1994), which introduced Western readers to the haiku and tanka (waka) of Fumi Saito, Yuko Kawano, Machi Tawara, Akitsu Ei and thirteen others. Lowitz and Aoyama later published The Collected Tanka of Akitsu Ei (AHA Poetry Press.)

A companion volume, Other Side River: Free Verse (1995) featured contemporary Japanese women free-verse poets in translation. It contains the work of three dozen Japanese women writers, including well-known poets as Shiraishi Kazuko, Ishigaki Rin and Ibaragi Noriko, who appeared alongside emerging Korean-Japanese (Zainichi) poets Chuwol Chong, Kyong Mi Park and Ainu poet Mieko Chikapp, among others. The two volumes, A Long Rainy Season and Other Side River, reflect a variety of literary styles and present an astonishing political and social awareness of women in a still male-centered society. Western readers are offered a new perspective on the lives of contemporary Japanese women. In 1993, she collaborated with the shakuhachi master Christopher Yohmei Blasdel on a series of readings and musical performances from these anthologies throughout Northern California.

In 1995, Lowitz edited Manoa: Towards a Literature of the Periphery, another anthology of translated Japanese literature, with fiction by Kyoko Murata, Hiromi Itoh, Yoshiko Shibaki, Teru Miyamoto, and Ango Sakaguchi. In 2001, she edited Manoa: Silence to Light: Japan and the Shadows of War, which contained essays by Donald Richie and Ishii Shinpei, last letters of kamikaze pilots (first-time in translation), testimonials from Taiwanese comfort women, voices of student nurses from Okinawa ordered to commit suicide, and war-related fiction and essays by Mishima Yukio, Hayashi Kyoko, Dazai Osamu, Kijima Hajime and Yōko Ogawa. The book also contains manga from Barefoot Gen by Keiji Nakazawa (translated by Frederik Schodt et al.), poetry by Tamura Ryuichi, Ayukawa Nobuo, Ko Un, Sagawa Aki, Ishigaki Choko, and war-related fiction by Mary Yukari Waters and Jeanne Wakatsuki Houston.

In 2003, she and Hisako Ifshin translated the prison-camp haiku of World War II internee Itaru Ina, which appeared in Modern Haiku and later in the Emmy Award-winning documentary film From A Silk Cocoon, directed by Satsuki Ina. Lowitz, Ifshin and with Ralph McCarthy also translated the poetry of pop sculptor cum cultural icon Yayoi Kusama (Violet Obsession) in conjunction with Kusama's solo exhibition touring the Los Angeles County Museum of Art, the New York Museum of Modern Art and the Walker Art Center in Minneapolis in 1998/99.

In 2004, Lowitz edited The Japan Journals 1947-2004 by Donald Richie. From the former curator of film at the New York Museum of Modern Art and the leading Western authority on Japanese film, The Japan Journals include post-war encounters with Yasunari Kawabata, D.T. Suzuki, Yukio Mishima, Toru Takemitsu and Bando Tamasaburo.

In 2008, Lowitz with Shogo Oketani translated America and Other Poems by Ayukawa Nobuo. These are war poems by Japan's foremost modernist poet, who was the Japanese translator of T. S. Eliot and a founding member of the Arechi or Waste Land school of poetry, but also an unhappy soldier in the Japanese Imperial Army. This book received the Japan-U.S. Friendship Commission Prize for the Translation of Japanese Literature from The Donald Keene Center of Japanese Culture at New York's Columbia University in 2003.

Lowitz first lived in Tokyo from 1989 to 1994, when she worked as a freelance writer/editor for The Japan Times and the Asahi Evening News and was an art critic for Art in America. She lectured on American Literature and Writing at Rikkyo University and Tokyo University. She was a regular book reviewer for KQED Radio's Pacific Time, covering Asia and the Pacific Rim, and also reviewed books on Asia for The Japan Times and Manoa (1991-2003).

Lowitz's own writing explores the idea of place, displacement and what "home" means to expatriate women. Her 2001 book Yoga Poems: Lines to Unfold By used the Yoga Sutra of Patanjali to structure her personal quest for a spiritual life. The book has appeared in French, Japanese and Persian editions, with individual poems having been translated into Spanish and Burmese as well. She and Reema Datta later co-authored Sacred Sanskrit Words for Yoga, Chant, and Meditation for Stone Bridge Press. She also writes short stories and essays. After a decade in America (1994-2004) she returned to Tokyo, where she opened a yoga studio. She is currently Contributing Editor for the Kyoto Journal.

Lowitz's work has appeared in hundreds of literary journals including The Huffington Post, Shambhala Sun, The New York Times online, Yoga Journal, Best Buddhist Writing of 2011, Harpers, ZYZZYVA, Prairie Schooner, Wingspan (the All Nippon Airways in-flight magazine) and anthologies such as Language for A New Century (W.W. Norton), The Columbia Anthology of Modern Japanese Literature, The Poem Behind the Poem: Translating Asian Poetry (Copper Canyon Press), Tomo: Friendship Through Fiction: An Anthology of Japan Teen Stories, My Postwar Life (Chicago Quarterly Review), Expat: Women's True Tales of Life Abroad, The Broken Bridge, An Inn Near Kyoto and RUNES. Lowitz's fiction has been broadcast on National Public Radio's “The Sound of Writing” and her art reviews and literary criticism have been published in Art in America, The Asahi Evening News, Sculpture, The Japan Times, The Mainichi News, The Asahi Evening News, The Yomiuri Daily News, The San Francisco Chronicle, The Oakland Tribune, among others. She is a regular contributor to the "Doubletake" column on multicultural life in Wingspan, the All Nippon Airways in-flight magazine.

For over twenty years, she has been owner of the popular yoga studio Sun and Moon Yoga in Tokyo, and trained over 2000 instructors in Restorative Yoga. She has taught writing, yoga and mindfulness around the world at many literary and yoga festivals. She graduated from a seven-year intensive program in Vajrayana Buddhism in 2013. She is a certified Mindfulness Meditation Teacher through the Awareness Training Institute and the Greater Good Science Center at the University of California at Berkeley https://ggsc.berkeley.edu/who_we_are. She is married to the writer and translator Shogo Oketani, author of J-Boys: Kazuo's World, Tokyo, 1965. Her work is archived in the University of Chicago library's special collection of poetry from Japan.

== Honors ==
- APALA (Asian/Pacific American Librarians Association) Award in Young Adult Literature for Jet Black and the Ninja Wind.
- U.S.-Japan Friendship Commission Award for the Translation of Japanese Literature from the Donald Keene Center of Japanese Culture at Columbia University
- International PEN Oakland Josephine Miles Award for Best Book of Poetry
- Bay Area Independent Publisher's Association Award
- Benjamin Franklin Award for Editorial Excellence for A Long Rainy Season
- PEN Syndicated Fiction Award
- Translation Fellowship from the National Endowment for the Arts
- California Arts Council Individual Fellowship in Poetry
- National Endowment for the Humanities Independent Scholar Fellowship
- Copperfield's Dickens Fiction Award
- Barbara Deming Memorial Award in the Novel
- Japanophile Fiction Award
- Tokyo Journal Fiction Translation Award for Leipzig of Light and Color by Tawada Yoko (with Gen Watanabe)

== Book publications ==
- Jet Black and the Winds of Darkness (Co-authored with Shogo Oketani, Excalibur Books)
- Awakened Heart: The Prince Who Became The Light (Wandering Mind Books)
- Virtuous Heart: Twelve Buddhist Stories to Awaken and Inspire (Wandering Mind Books)
- Manoa Journal: Mountain/Home (Editor, Univ. of Hawaii Press https://uhpress.hawaii.edu)
- Up from the Sea (Crown Books for Young Readers/Penguin Random House)
- Here Comes the Sun: A Journey to Adoption in 8 Chakras (Stone Bridge Press)
- Jet Black and the Ninja Wind (co-authored with Shogo Oketani, Tuttle Publishing https://www.tuttlepublishing.com)
- Yoga Heart: Lines on the Six Perfections (Stone Bridge Press)
- America and Other Poems by Ayukawa Nobuo (co-translated by Shogo Oketani, Kaya Press https://kaya.com)
- Yoga Poems: Lines to Unfold By (Stone Bridge Press)
- Sacred Sanskrit Words: For Yoga, Chant and Meditation (Stone Bridge Press)
- The Japan Journals by Donald Richie 1947-2004 (Editor, Stone Bridge Press)
- Designing with Kanji: Japanese Character Motifs for Surface, Skin & Spirit (Stone Bridge Press)
- Violet Obsession by Yayoi Kusama (Co-translator, Wandering Mind Books)
- A Long Rainy Season: Contemporary Japanese Women's Poetry (Volume I, Stone Bridge Press)
- Other Side River: Contemporary Japanese Women's Poetry (Volume II, Stone Bridge Press)
- Manoa Journal: Silence to Light: Japan and the Shadows of War (Editor, Univ. of Hawaii Press https://uhpress.hawaii.edu)
- Manoa Journal: Towards A Literature of the Periphery (Editor, University of Hawaii Press https://uhpress.hawaii.edu)
- Japan: Spirit and Form by Shuichi Kato (Tuttle Publishing https://www.tuttlepublishing.com, co-translator with Junko Abe)
- Beautiful Japan: A Souvenir (Tuttle Publishing https://www.tuttlepublishing.com)
- Green Tea to Go: Short Stories from Tokyo (Printed Matter Press)
- 100 Aspects of the Moon: Poems (Printed Matter Press)
- Old Ways to Fold New Paper (Wandering Mind Books)

== Sources ==
- Contemporary Authors Autobiography Series, Volume 26, Edited by Shelly Andrews (Gale Research, 1997). Entry on Leza Lowitz. Pages 163–184.
- Introduction to Mänoa: Fiction from Japan (University of Hawaii Press, 1995) by Frank Stewart.
- Introduction to Mänoa: Silence to Light: Japan and the Shadows of War (University of Hawaii Press, 2001) by Frank Stewart.
- Collected Tanka of Akitsu Ei, Translated by Miyuki Aoyama and Leza Lowitz, AHA Poetry, 2002.
- Introduction to A Long Rainy Season: Contemporary Japanese Women's Poetry (Stone Bridge Press, 1994) by Leza Lowitz.
- Introduction to Other Side River: Contemporary Japanese Women's Poetry (Stone Bridge Press, 1995) by Leza Lowitz.
- Interview with Sascha Hewitt, Natural Healing Center, Tokyo. 2003.
- Introduction to The Japan Journals 1947-2004 by Donald Richie (Stone Bridge Press, 2004) by Leza Lowitz.
- "They Who Render Anew: Japanese-English Literary Translators Reflect Upon Their Calling," Interview by Avery Fischer. (Kyoto Journal), Volume 56, 2004.
- "Designing With Kanji: An Interview with Leza Lowitz and Shogo Oketani” Ai-Eye Magazine, Tokyo: January, 2004.
- "Midwifing the Underpoem," By Leza Lowitz, The Poem Behind the Poem: Translating Asian Poetry, Copper Canyon Press, Port Townsend, Washington, 2004.
- "Two Pens are Better Than One," interview with Leza Lowitz and Shogo Oketani, The Daily Yomiuri, 2006 by Tom Baker.
- Introduction to "America and Other Poems" by Ayukawa Nobuo (Kaya Press, 2008), by Shogo Oketani.
- “A Japanese Modernist Poet’s America.” Interview with Shogo Oketani and Leza Lowitz by Jane Joritz-Nakagawa (Society of Writer's Editors and Translators Newsletter, Number 120. Tokyo, July 2008.)
- "Getting Green Tea to Go" Interview with Leza Lowitz by Rachel Turner, Being A Broad Magazine, Tokyo, July 2008.
- "Modern Japanese Poetry: Two Translations" by Kate McCandless. Pacific Rim Review of Books Victoria, BC, Canada, Issue Nine, Summer 2008.
