= The Four Immigrants Manga =

Japanese manga

- First English-language edition of The Four Immigrants Manga (Stone Bridge Press, 1998)

漫画四人書生 (Manga Yonin Shosei)
- Genre: Autobiographical, comedy
- Manga
- Written by: Henry (Yoshitaka) Kiyama
- English publisher: NA: Stone Bridge Press
- Published: 1931 (U.S.)
- Volumes: 1

The Four Immigrants Manga (1931), originally titled The Four Students Manga (漫画四人書生, Manga Yonin Shosei; "manga of the four students"), is a Japanese-language manga written and illustrated by Henry Kiyama, born Yoshitaka Kiyama (木山義喬, Kiyama Yoshitaka; 1885–1951). It is an early example of autobiographical comics.

The manga was created around 1924–1927 as 52 "episodes", each a two-page spread intended for serialization in a Japanese-language newspaper. In 1927, the originals were exhibited at San Francisco's Golden Gate Institute. In 1931, it was self published in San Francisco as a one-shot manga. It was republished in Japan by Shimpu in August 2012. It was translated into English by Frederik L. Schodt and was published by Stone Bridge Press as The Four Immigrants Manga: A Japanese Experience in San Francisco 1904–1924 in October 1998. In summer 2017, it was adapted into The Four Immigrants: An American Musical Manga at TheatreWorks (Silicon Valley).

== Development ==
The manga drew from the experiences of Kiyama and his three friends when they were college-age Japanese immigrants to San Francisco between 1904 and 1924. The year 1924 is chosen as it was when the "immigration laws stiffened and some of the protagonists elected to return to Japan". Inspired by western comic strips, Kiyama drew each episode of Four Immigrants in a two-page spread, ending at 52 episodes for a year's worth of weekly newspaper comic strips. Jason Thompson notes that "each strip has sort of a punchline, but also tells a story; it's not so different from reading a yonkoma manga in which the story is broken up for gags every four panels." Kiyama tried to have Four Immigrants serialized in a Japanese-language newspaper in San Francisco, but was unsuccessful. In 1927, Kiyama exhibited the pages of the manga in a gallery of San Francisco's Kinmon Gakuen (Golden Gate Institute) in an exhibition titled "A Manga North American Immigrant History" (Manga Hokubei Iminshi). The manga covered the immigrants' arrival and quarantine on Angel Island as well as major events of the time: 1906 San Francisco earthquake, Panama–Pacific International Exposition of 1915 and the 1918 flu pandemic with criticism of "several Congressional acts designed to curtail Asian immigration." Most of the manga "concentrates on student immigrant experiences prior to the Gentlemen's Agreement of 1907". In 1931, Kiyama had the book printed in Japan, then self-published it in San Francisco.

Kiyama had the immigrants speak in Meiji era Japanese, with the Americans speaking in broken English and the Chinese speaking in Cantonese. In his translation, Frederik L. Schodt had kept the Americans speaking broken English, with the immigrants speaking in perfect English. This had the effect of "[helping] readers see the Japanese characters as "us" and the Americans as weird, frequently baffling foreigners, consistent with the general viewpoint of the comic." Schodt found Kiyama's work in 1980 in University of California's East Asian Library. He began translating the work in 1997, which was published by Stone Bridge Press in October 1998. Through interviewing Kiyama's surviving relatives in Japan and studying his private papers and artwork, Schodt concludes that the characters Charlie, Frank and Fred "are roughly based on the people that Kiyama knew." He further claims that the manga is "one of the very first journalistic comic books".

Racism between the immigrants and the locals was predominantly between Japanese immigrants and European-American locals, however "racial animosity ... existed between Chinese and Japanese immigrants in the United States." Garrity comments on the prevalence of racism of that era: "a hundred years ago, everyone, of every background, was openly and casually racist." The "four immigrants [refer] to white people as keto and black people as kuroto."

== Reception ==
Manga Critic Katherine Dacey writes that the manga's "visual style and subject matter may not strike contemporary readers as manga-esque ... but the intimate quality of the stories will leave as lasting an impression as graphic memoirs such as Marjane Satrapi's Persepolis and Alison Bechdel's Fun Home." Time's Andrew Arnold praises the manga as "a book to be enjoyed by readers of history and comix." "This once-lost artifact," he continues, "works as both a delightful read and a reminder of where Americans come from and who we are now." Jason Thompson writes that the manga is "frozen in time with diligent documentary-style realism, with cynical humor and cartoony cheer". Shaenon K. Garrity applauds the manga as a "historical artifact and a milestone in the evolution of comics" and says Schodt's translation provides "historical background and [explains] all the untranslatable puns." Harvard Asia Pacific Review commends Kiyama's "keen insight into the workings of society, especially into Japanese-American interaction." Booklist's Gordon Flagg comments that the manga is "a fascinating cultural document of an era of great interest to scholars of Asian American culture. Since it is apparently the first U.S. comic book consisting of original material instead of reprinted newspaper strips, it is also of interest to students of American comics. Writing in American Studies International, Robert Humphrey commends Kiyama for his "gentle humor that appeals to readers of all cultures ... [since] his cartoons are not only informative about their own time period, they remain funny in ours". Michael Boatwright, writing for the Journal of Adolescent & Adult Literacy, comments on Kiyama's emphasis on the characters' "cartoon-like features" with the usage of "simplistic lines and circles", which "readers to identify more readily with characters." Kom Kunyosying draws a parallel between the manga and Mikhail Bakhtin's essay Epic and Novel as they are both "anti-genre," which "achieves much of what other forms cannot, including an ability to engage with contemporary reality, and an ability to re-conceptualize the individual in a complex way that interrogates his subjectivity and offers the possibility of redefining his own image." Brian Hayashi criticizes the manga for its "strong upper-class bias" and that Schodt did not account for the difference in treatment of Japanese students and Japanese immigrants in general. AnimeFringe's Janet Houck commends the characters for not being "depressive" and for bringing "their own unique spin on how to be successful in California, from farming rice to investing in banks to gambling." Jeff Chon of Sequart comments that the manga "isn't just a shared piece of history between comics fans, but a bit of cultural and personal history we as Americans need to share more often."

== In popular culture ==
In 2017, American playwright Min Kahng created a musical stage adaptation of The Four Immigrants, which was produced by TheatreWorks Silicon Valley.
