= Risley (circus act) =

Type of circus act

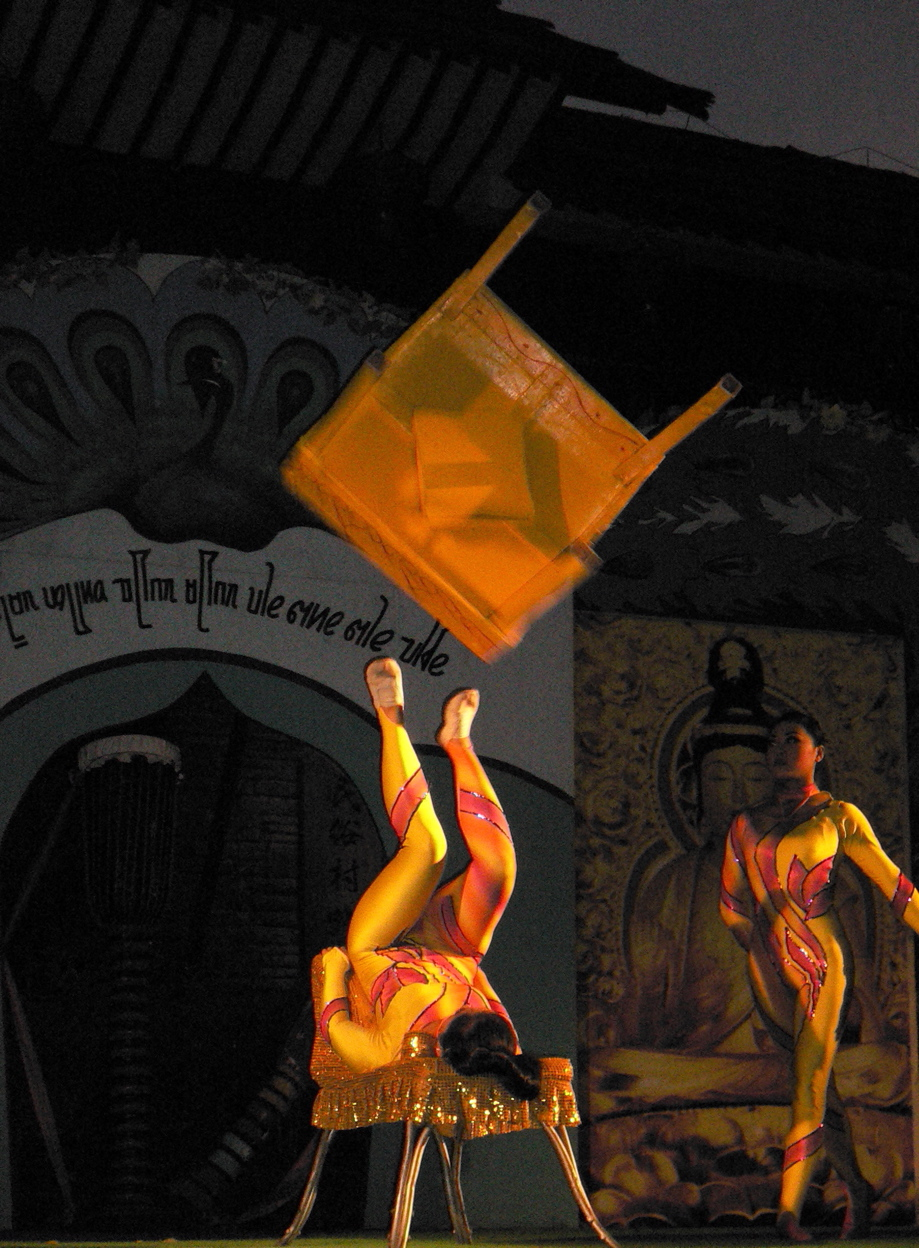

A Risley or Risley act (also antipode or antipodism) is any circus acrobalance posture where the base person is lying supine, supporting one or more flyers with hands, feet and/or other parts of the body; spinning a person or object using only one's feet.

The act is named after Richard Risley Carlisle (1814–1874) who developed this kind of act in the United States.

Risleys can be separated into three general categories of skills:

- Skills that are based with the hands
- Skills that are based with the feet
- Other

== See also ==
- Acroyoga
- Professor Risley and the Imperial Japanese Troupe
