= Japanese people in San Francisco =

There is a Japanese American and a Japanese national population in San Francisco and the San Francisco Bay Area. The center of the Japanese and Japanese American community is in San Francisco's Japantown.

== History ==
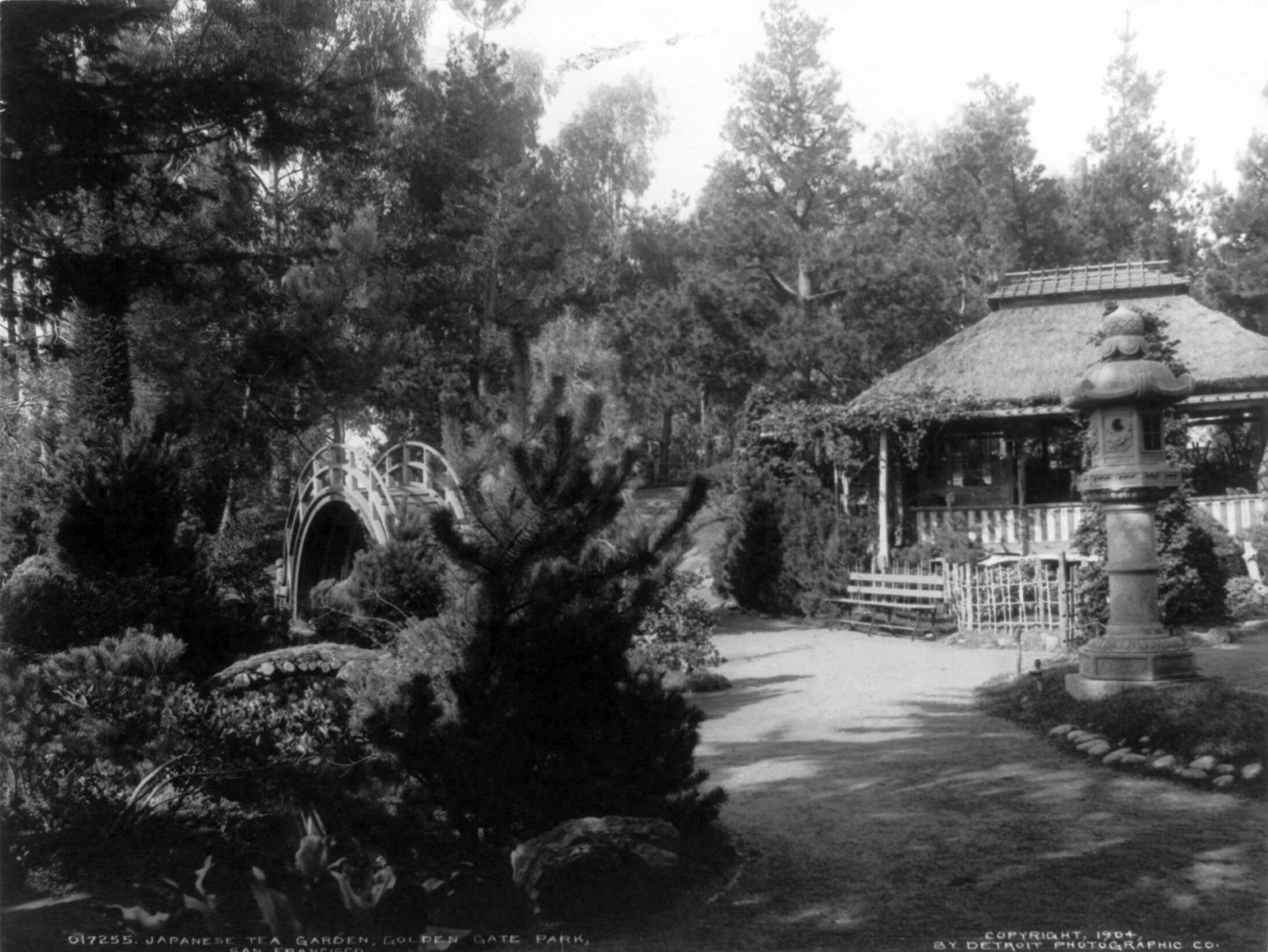
San Francisco's Japanese Tea Garden in 1904

Japan had maintained an official policy of isolation from Europe and most of its colonies since 1639, and emigration was strictly controlled. However, in the years that followed Commodore Matthew C Perry's 1854 arrival, Japan underwent a great social transformation, and for many Japanese, the U.S. became a model for military power and a desirable way of life.

After the Meiji Restoration in 1868, Japan's rapid urbanisation and industrialisation brought about great social disruption and agricultural decline. Farmers were evicted and workers were left employed by foreign competition, they looked more and more for a better life outside the islands of their homeland. As Japanese wages decreased, and word of a booming U.S. economy spread, the lure of the United States became difficult to resist.

The first Japanese immigrants arrived in San Francisco Bay in 1869. Initially, Japanese immigrants moved to the edge of San Francisco's Chinatown and the South of Market neighborhood.

Asian American Studies professor Yuji Ichioka estimated that there were around 300 Japanese "school boys"—immigrants who are working to earn their education in the United States—living in San Francisco in 1885.

Following the San Francisco Earthquake in 1906, the Japanese community relocated to the city's present day Japantown in the Western Addition, and also the South Park neighborhood. In 1900 there were 90 Japanese businesses. By 1909 this figure increased to 545.

After the earthquake, the San Francisco Board of Education passed a regulation requiring that Japanese American students attend separate, racially specific schools. This local action led to an international dispute, following the vigorous objections of the Japanese government. The result of the dispute was the Gentlemen's Agreement of 1907, which greatly restricted the flow of Japanese nationals to the United States.

San Jose's Japantown was founded due to the need of combining comradeship and resources to survive as immigrants in the United States. Initially, it was known as "Heinlenville between Jackson and Taylor east of Sixth Street". However, John Heinlen offered his own property for the new location after the city's second Chinatown burned to the ground under mysterious circumstances. Despite outrage from the general public, Mr Heinlen built a new Chinatown entirely of brick. He then rented these buildings to the Chinese at very low rates.

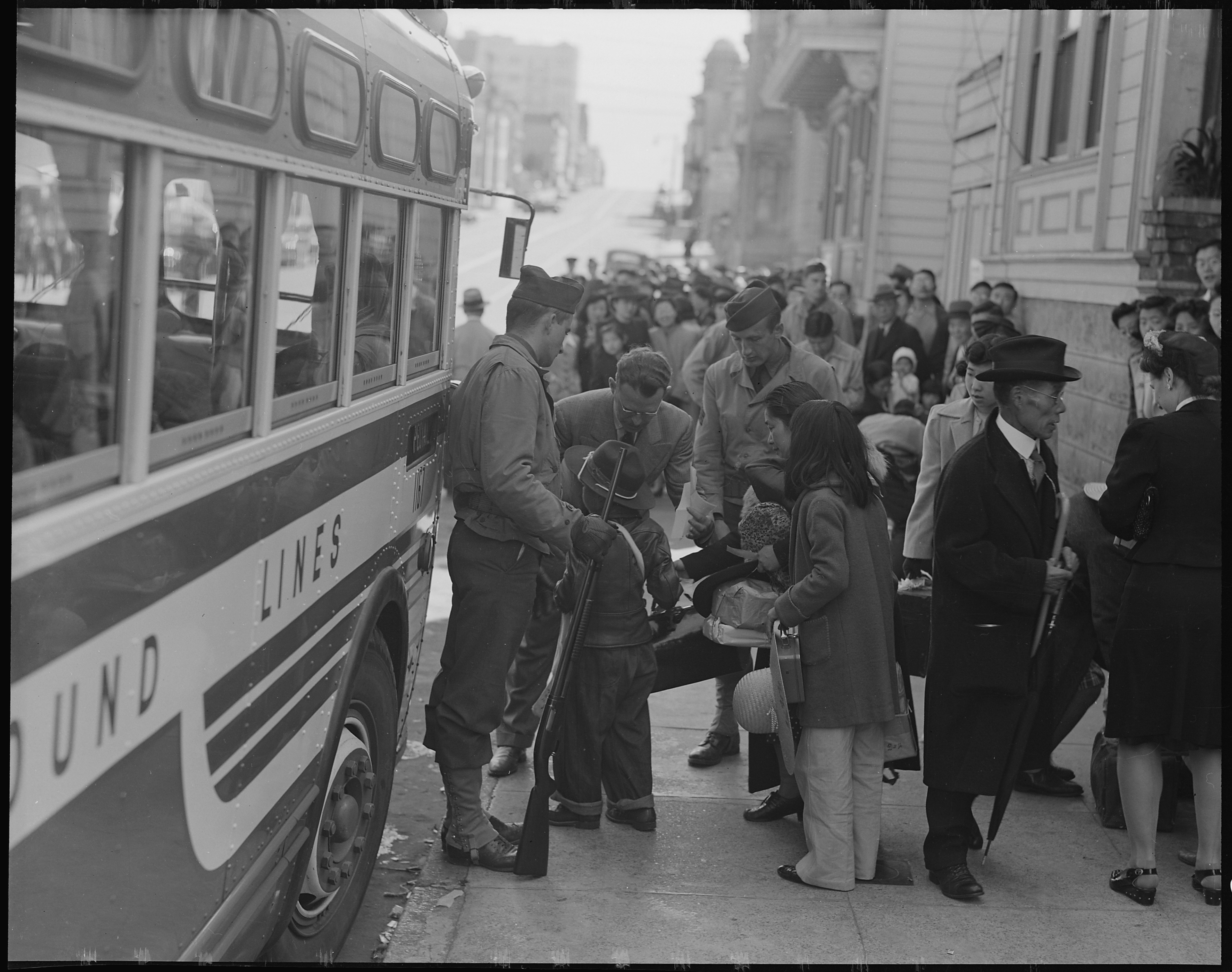
Japanese Americans in the process of being removed from San Francisco during World War II.

During World War II, San Francisco saw the largest and oldest enclave of Japanese outside of Japan, Japantown, completely empty out its ethnic Japanese residents as a result of Executive Order 9066 that forced all Japanese of birth or descent in the United States to be interned. By 1943 many large sections of the neighborhood remained vacant due to the forced internment.

Following the war, some Japanese Americans returned, followed by new Japanese immigrants as well as investment from the Japanese Government and Japanese companies. However, many did not return to the neighborhood and instead settled in other parts of the city, or out to the suburbs altogether. This was further exacerbated by the city's efforts to rejuvenate the neighborhood initiated by Justin Herman in the Western Addition in the 1960s through the 1980s.

Civil rights attorney Wayne M. Collins, who worked many prominent cases on behalf of members of the Japanese American community, both lived and worked in San Francisco until his death in 1974. Among his clients were Fred Korematsu, Iva Toguri D'Aquino, and Japanese American renunciants from the Tule Lake War Relocation Center.

== Diversity ==
The Japanese population of the South Bay is diverse, and many have mixed-race backgrounds due to the growing trend of inter-racial marriages. According to a study conducted by Japanese American Citizens League, between 2000 and 2009, the mixed race Japanese population in San Jose grew by 27.3%, while the monoracial Japanese population declined.

== Institutions ==
The Fukuin Kai opened in 1877. The book San Francisco's Japantown stated that this was believed to be the first Japanese organization in the United States.

== Education ==
The San Francisco Japanese School (SFJS) is a Japanese Ministry of Education (MEXT)-designated weekend Japanese school serving the area. The school system, headquartered in San Francisco, rents classrooms in four schools serving a total of over 1,600 students as of 2016; two of the schools are in San Francisco and two are in the South Bay. For elementary students it operates out of the A.P. Giannini Middle School in San Francisco and The Harker School Blackford Campus in San Jose. For junior high school and high school students it operates out of Lowell High School in San Francisco and the J.F. Kennedy Middle School in Cupertino.

MEXT also defines the Grossman Academy Japanese Language School as an official weekend school. The academy has its offices in Fremont and its classes are held in Palo Alto.

Saniku Gakuin in Japan has an affiliated weekend Japanese school, the Saniku Gakuin Japanese School in Santa Clara, California (三育学院サンタクララ校 San'iku Gakuin Santakurara Kō). It holds its classes at Latimer Elementary School in San Jose.

Kinmon Gakuen (金門学園) is a Japanese language school in San Francisco, established in 1911.

Two San Francisco Unified School District elementary schools offer Japanese language and culture bilingual education - Clarendon Alternative Elementary School and Rosa Parks Elementary School.

== Notable people ==
- Richard Aoki (1938–2009), a Black Panther Party member and FBI informant
- Ruth Asawa (1926–2013), a sculptor
- Yoshiaki Fukuda (1898–1957), a Konko bishop and missionary
- Makoto Hagiwara (1854–1925), landscape designer and caretaker of San Francisco's Japanese Tea Garden, often credited with inventing the fortune cookie
- Hisako Hibi (1907–1991), an Issei painter and printmaker
- Mike Honda (born 1941), a congressional politician
- Yuji Ichioka (1936–2002), a historian and civil rights activist
- Hiroshi Kashiwagi (1922–2019), a poet, playwright and actor
- Thomas Yamamoto (1917–2004), an artist
- Wally Yonamine (1925–2011), multi-sport athlete who played for the San Francisco 49ers in 1947

== See also ==
- Angel Island Immigration Station
- Oriental Warehouse
- Japantown, San Francisco
- Japanese American National Library
- National Japanese American Historical Society
- Kinmon Gakuen
- J-Pop Summit
