= Kinmon Gakuen =

Japanese language school in San Francisco, California

- 金門学園

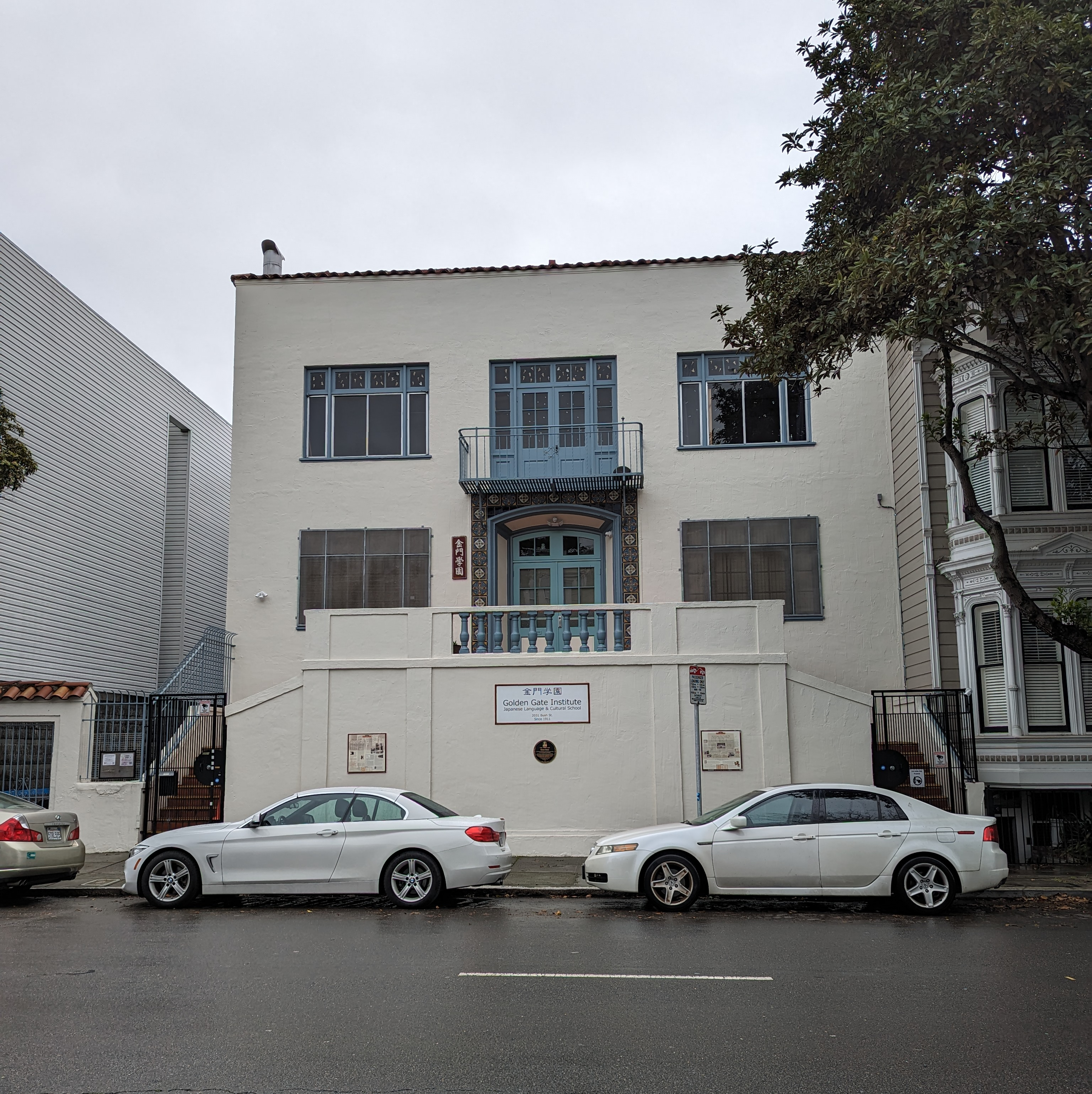
- The school in 2014

Location
- 2031 Bush Street; San Francisco, California 94115; United States; 37°47′14″N 122°25′50″W

Information
- Other name: Golden Gate Institute
- Established: 1911; 115 years ago
- Website: www.kinmongakuen.org

The Kinmon Gakuen (金門学園) or Golden Gate Institute is a Japanese language school in San Francisco, California, located at 2031 Bush Street. It was established in 1911 with 133 students. They currently offer programs to children from kindergarten to high school.

In 1927, the original art of Henry Yoshitaka Kiyama's Four Immigrants Manga was exhibited there.

The school was forced to close during World War II and was not able to reopen until 1949. It was visited by Japanese Emperor Hirohito in 1933 and 1935, and then-Crown Prince Akihito and Crown Princess Michiko in 1960. The institute celebrated the 100th anniversary of its establishment and received Japan's Foreign Minister's Commendation in 2011.

The building has been listed by the city as a San Francisco Designated Landmark (no. 288) since November 1, 2019, and it was listed on the National Register of Historic Places in 2026.

== See also ==
- Japanese language education in the United States
- History of the Japanese in San Francisco
- San Francisco Japanese School
