= Helen McCarthy =

British journalist and anime writer (born 1951)

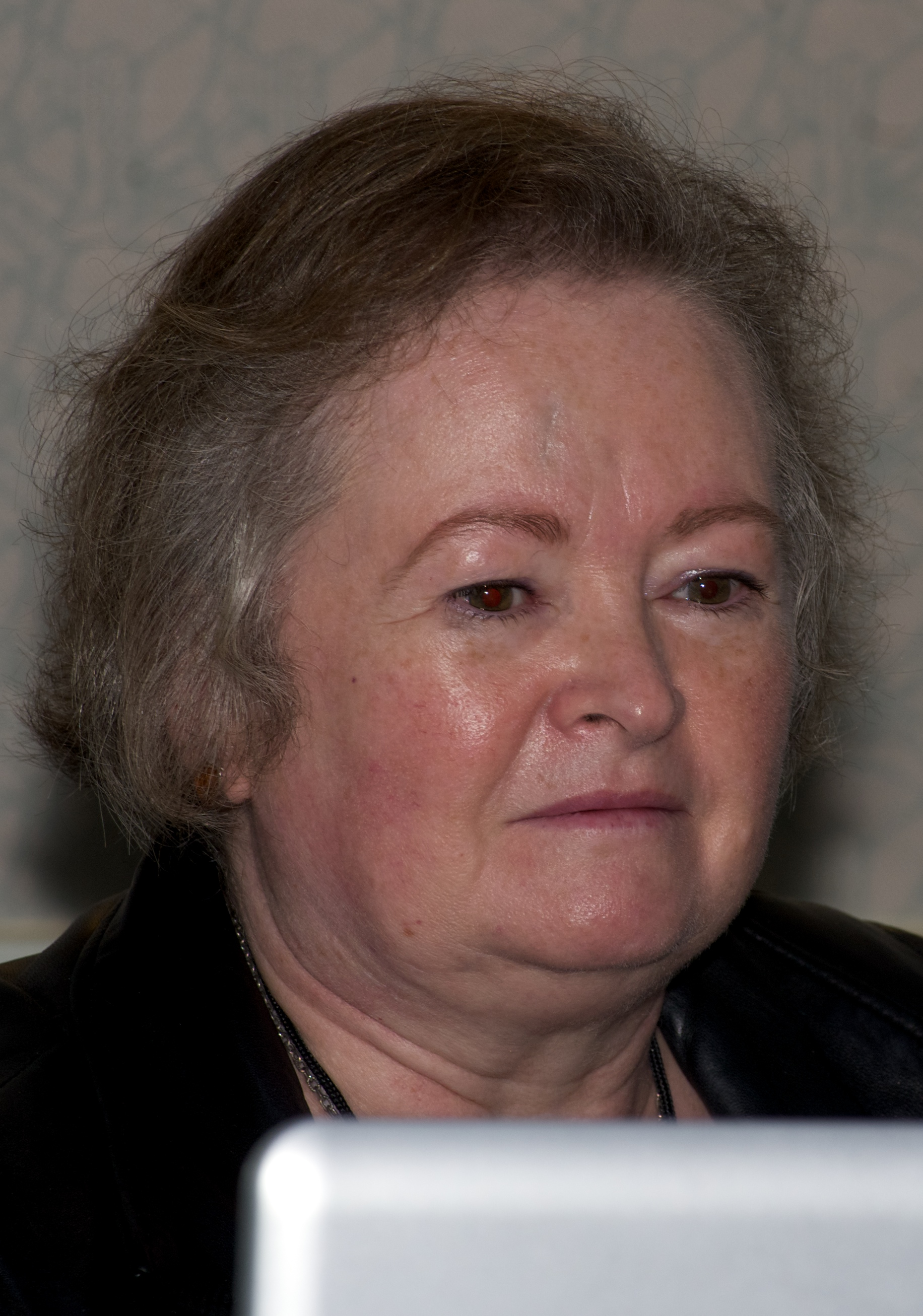
- McCarthy in 2011
- Born: 27 February 1951 (age 75)
- Writing career
- Subject: Anime
- Notable work: The Anime Encyclopedia

Helen McCarthy (born 27 February 1951) is a British author known for writing reference works on anime and manga, including 500 Manga Heroes and Villains, Anime!, The Anime Movie Guide, and Hayao Miyazaki: Master of Japanese Animation. She co-authored The Erotic Anime Movie Guide and The Anime Encyclopedia with Jonathan Clements. McCarthy also designs needlework and textile art.

== Background ==
McCarthy was among the earliest English-language authors to publish a book on anime. She has been credited with early involvement in promoting anime in the United Kingdom, including organising anime programming at conventions and contributing to early specialist publications.

In 1991, she founded Anime UK magazine. In 1992, she became a principal contributor to Super Play, a magazine focused on Super Nintendo Entertainment System titles with a strong emphasis on anime and manga. Anime UK later became Anime FX following a change in backing and ceased publication in 1996. During its publication, the magazine was involved in disputes with Manga Entertainment over editorial policy and its opposition to the trademarking of the term "manga". McCarthy also contributed to Manga Mania magazine and served as its editor from 1997 to 1998 after Anime UK closed.

McCarthy was able to apply her convention-running knowledge gained in SF and media fandom in 1994 when Anime UK ran the successful one-day convention AUKcon, attracting attendees from all over Europe. She has written numerous articles and essays and is a frequent convention guest, as well as speaking at film festivals and academic gatherings in Europe, America, and Japan. She has curated and delivered four successful seasons of lectures and screenings at the Barbican Cinema in London. In September 2008, she curated and presented a week-long film season and exhibition to mark the 80th anniversary of the birth of Osamu Tezuka, also at the Barbican. The season featured London's first professional Japanese kamishibai performance. Her relationship with the Barbican continues with a further anime film season, Anime's Human Machines, presented in September 2019 as part of the Life Rewired project.

She has also been a guest speaker at the University of Maryland and at Akita International University. She is a founding member of the Fandom and NeoMedia Studies Association (FANS), gave the keynote address at their inaugural conference, and spoke at their first Japanese symposium at Yamanashi Gakuin in 2017.

McCarthy is interested in the many crossing points and influences between anime, manga, and other arts. Manga Cross-Stitch, a guide to using the visual grammar of anime and manga to create original needlework designs, appeared in 2009. Artist Steve Kyte provided many of the designs in the book, with the rest being created by McCarthy. She has since expanded her needlework activities with workshops for the Japan Foundation and at conventions. Her interest in the history and artistic potential of textiles led to contributions to the Future Beauty: 30 Years of Japanese Fashion exhibition at the Barbican, including a catalogue essay, and to presentations on the history of cosplay. She worked with choreographer Sidi Larbi Cherkaoui and his team on TeZuKa at Sadler's Wells in 2011, and on Pluto at the Barbican in 2017 and in European City of Culture Leeuwarden in 2018. In 2018, she also presented on 2.5D Theatre at the Daiwa Japan Foundation alongside Alexandra Rutter of Whole Hog Theatre.

== Awards ==
- 2010: winner of a Harvey Award for The Art of Osamu Tezuka: God of Manga.
- 2010: nominated for an Eisner Award for The Art of Osamu Tezuka: God of Manga.
- 2008: Great Britain Sasakawa Foundation and Authors' Foundation award for research into Japanese animation and comics.
- 2006: IMAF Award for Outstanding Achievement in Anime and Manga, sponsored by the International Manga and Anime Foundation.
- 1997: Japan Festival Award for work in promoting understanding of Japanese culture in Britain, from the Japan Foundation.

== Publications ==
- Manga Manga Manga, A Celebration of Japanese Animation at the ICA pub Island World Communications (London) 1992. ISBN 0-9520434-0-8
- Anime! A Beginners Guide To Japanese Animation pub. Titan (London) 1993. ISBN 1-85286-492-3
- The Anime Movie Guide: Japanese Animation since 1983 pub. Titan (London) 1996 ISBN 1-85286-631-4
- The Erotic Anime Movie Guide (with Jonathan Clements) pub Titan (London) 1998 ISBN 1-85286-946-1
- Hayao Miyazaki: Master of Japanese Animation pub Stone Bridge Press (Berkeley, CA) 1999 ISBN 1-880656-41-8
- The Anime Encyclopedia: A Guide to Japanese Animation Since 1917 (with Jonathan Clements) pub Stone Bridge Press (Berkeley, CA) 2001 ISBN 1-880656-64-7; 2nd edition 2006, ISBN 1-933330-10-4
- 500 Manga Heroes and Villains pub Collins & Brown (London) 2006 ISBN 1-84340-234-3, Barron's Educational (USA) ISBN 978-0-7641-3201-8
- 500 Essential Anime You Must Own pub Ilex (Lewes) 2008, ISBN 978-1-905814-28-2, Collins Design (USA) 2009, ISBN 978-0-06-147450-7
- Manga Cross-Stitch: Make Your Own Graphic Art Needlework, pub Ilex (Lewes) 2009, ISBN 978-1-905814-51-0, Andrews McMeel (USA) 2009, ISBN 978-0-7407-7965-7
- The Art of Osamu Tezuka: God of Manga pub Ilex (Lewes) 2009, ISBN 978-1-905814-66-4 Abrams ComicArts (USA) 2009, ISBN 978-0-8109-8249-9
- Manga Impact: The World of Japanese Animation pub Phaidon Press (New York, NY) 2010, ISBN 978-0714857411
- A Brief History of Manga pub Ilex (Lewes) 2014, ISBN 978-1-781570982
- How to Draw Manga Made Easy pub Flame Tree (London) 2015, ISBN 978-1-783615926
- Drawing Basics Made Easy pub Flame Tree (London) 2015, ISBN 978-1-783616039
