= Yolanda Kusakabe =

Japanese-Italian pianist

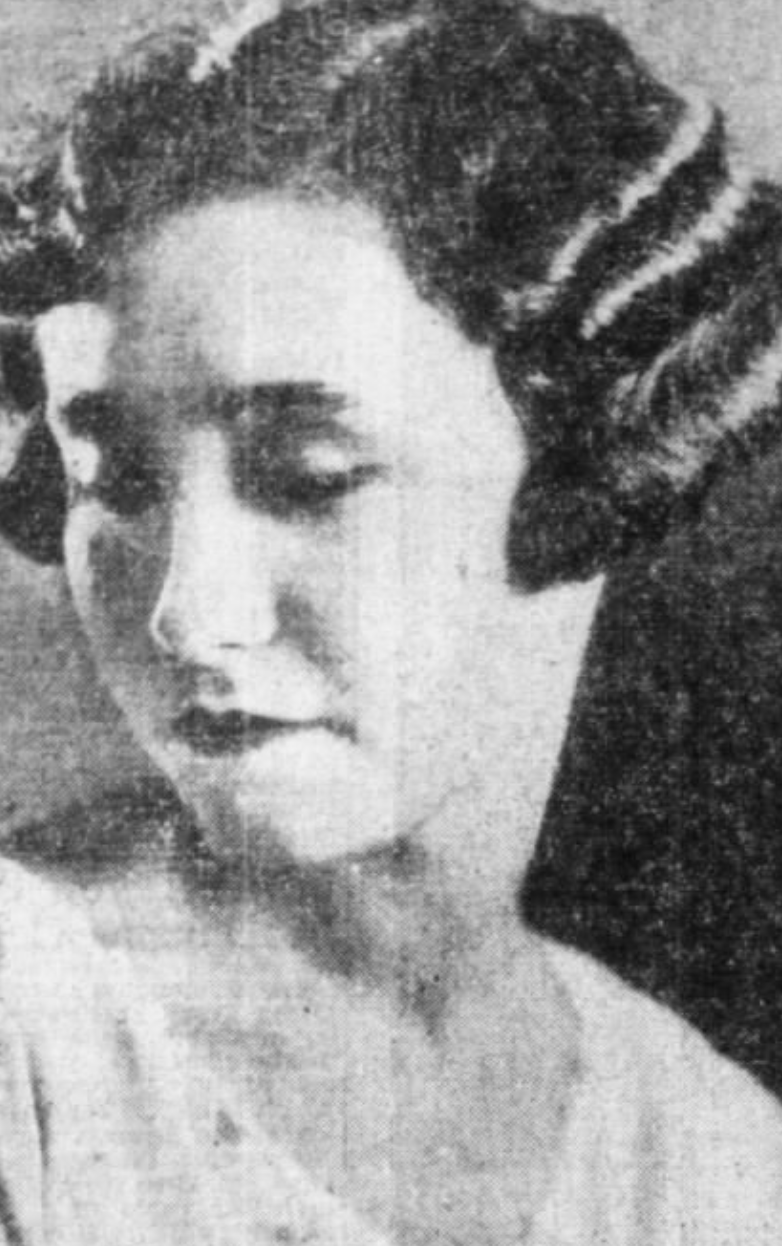
- Yolanda Kusakabe, from a 1928 newspaper
- Born: about 1907; Italy
- Other names: Yolande Kusakabe, Yolanda Hikabe
- Occupation: Pianist

Yolanda Kusakabe (born about 1907) was a Japanese-Italian pianist who toured internationally in the 1920s.

== Early life and education ==
Kusakabe was born in Italy, the daughter of Sankuro Kusakabe. Her father was a Japanese diplomat in Hawaii and Rome, and her mother, Beatrice, was an Italian woman who traveled with her on tours. Kusakabe attended the Accademia Nazionale di Santa Cecilia in Rome, and was described as "the first Japanese pianist to graduate from that institution."

== Career ==
Kusakabe was decorated for her wartime performances for the Italian Red Cross. She toured as "Yolanda Hikabe" with tenor Yoshie Fujiwara, and performed in Japan and Hawaii in 1928, playing both European and Japanese compositions. In San Francisco in January 1929, she gave a recital at the Kinmon Gakuen Hall, and another at the Fairmont Hotel. In February 1929, she made her New York debut, with a concert at Steinway Hall. She gave another concert at the same venue in March 1929, when The New York Times reported that "she showed digital dexterity and a fluent style". Her American manager was Alice Seckels. Italian composer Ottorino Respighi described her as "a fine talent, a real artist."

== Personal life ==
In 1936, Kusakabe and Taiso Watanabe, who worked at the Japanese embassy in Rome, were engaged to marry.
