= Inside the Robot Kingdom =

1988 book by Frederik L. Schodt

Inside the Robot Kingdom: Japan, Mechatronics, and the Coming Robotopia
- Cover from paperback edition
- Author: Frederik L. Schodt
- Language: English
- Genre: Non-fiction
- Publisher: Kodansha International; Harper & Row
- Publication date: 1988
- Publication place: United States
- Media type: Print (hardback & paperback)
- Pages: 256
- ISBN: 0-87011-854-4 (USA), ISBN 4-7700-1354-X (Japan)
- OCLC: 16925480
- Dewey Decimal: 338/.06 19
- LC Class: TJ211 .S39 1988

Inside the Robot Kingdom: Japan, Mechatronics, and the Coming Robotopia is a 1988 book about robotics in Japan by Frederik L. Schodt. In 2011, it was also issued as an e-book for the Kindle, Nook, and iBookstore platforms, with a new cover designed by Raymond Larrett, added color photographs, and free-flowing, searchable text.

This book describes the fascination that Japan has had from the very beginning of acquiring technology, from the first visit by Commodore Matthew C. Perry in 1853 to Tokyo and the integration of technology into Japanese society, which they, according to the book, feel will strengthen and improve their society, economy and life in Japan and the world. They regard technology, according to the book, as a savior from dangerous and monotonous jobs that robots can be designed to do instead, freeing up the human labor force to do more worthwhile pursuits.

The book mentions Isaac Asimov's proposed Three Laws of Robotics, and also talks about the Japanese comic book character Astro Boy as examples of robotic integration into Japanese society.
