= K.O. Beast =

Anime series

- K.O. BEAST

KO世紀ビースト三獣士 (Kei Ō Seiki Bīsuto Sanjūshi)
- Original video animation
- Directed by: Hiroshi Negishi
- Produced by: Yasuhisa Kazama; Nagateru Kato; Toru Harada
- Written by: Satoru Akahori
- Music by: Yasuhiko Fukuda
- Studio: Zero-G Room; Animate Film
- Released: 2 May 1992 – 21 November 1993
- Episodes: 7

K.O. Beast, known in Japan as K.O. Century Beast Warriors (KO世紀ビースト三獣士, KO Seiki Beast Sanjūshi), is an OVA series.

== History ==
In 1993–1994, Anime UK, a British-based magazine, brought the first three episodes to the UK market on its own label and this was Anime UK's only release.

It was released in America by Right Stuf. The American version made references to Pokémon due to the voice cast having also worked for the dub of Pokémon.

== Story ==
The series is set in the distant future in which the Earth is split in two. The Southern Hemisphere is placed in another dimension, while the inhabitants of the Northern Hemisphere are able to morph into beast-like humanoids. Eventually the humans of the Southern Hemisphere, led by Uranus, attack the Beasts.

The Three Beasts, Wan Derbard (Wan Dabadadatta) of the Tiger Tribe, Bud Mint (Baado Mint) of the Bird Tribe, and Mei Mer (Mei Mah) of the Mermaid Tribe, are taken prisoner along with Mei Mer's companion Tuttle Millen (Mekka Mannen, also of the Mermaid tribe), but manage to escape thanks to a little girl named Yuuni Charm Password. Together they seek Gaia, which they believe to be a fabulous treasure, but they are pursued by Uranus's minions: V-Darn the vicious mage-knight, V-Sion the warrior woman and Akumako, V-Darn's sadistic imp-like partner.

== Characters ==
The series has three main characters:

- Wan – the male leader who dresses in red
- Bud Mint – the male loner
- Mei Mer – the female

To these are added the child Yuni, who is female, and a bulky male Tuttle (so-written in the English subtitles) to complete a typical five-character adventure team. All but Yuni are "beasts" who usually appear in anthropomorphic form but who can easily shapeshift. For instance, when Wan becomes angry or sneezes, he turns into a tiger, though he still wears his trousers, as does Bud, who becomes a rooster when he is frightened or disgusted. Mei Mer's legs are replaced by a porpoise's tail; Tuttle becomes a sea turtle, his cumbersome body becoming an armored sphere. The first three are heroes of their tribes of beasts, each committed to protecting a magical statue of their tribe, which are called "Jinn". Each has a stereotypical childish desire: Wan is hungry, Bud Mint wants girls, and Mei Mer wants wealth. In addition, Bud often begins his responses with English expletives or sayings. The joke is that the symbol of the US is the eagle, but he is a chicken.

Their enemies are the human beings V-Darn and V-Sion, whose names involve a pun on the Japanese word for "beautiful", namely bi for v, and the story begins with all heroes captured and taken to the enemy stronghold, and the three statues taken.

=== Voice cast ===
Character	Japanese voice	English voice
Wan Derbard	Kappei Yamaguchi	Sam Riegel
Bud Mint	Takehito Koyasu	Liam O'Brien
Mei Mer	Mika Kanai	Debora Rabbai
V-Sion	Yūko Mizutani	Rachael Lillis
Akumako	Naoko Matsui	Lisa Ortiz
