= Route Awakening =

Route Awakening (Mandarin Chinese: 寰行中国, romanized: Huanxing Zhongguo) is a National Geographic television documentary series presented by Harry Yuan and Jonathan Clements. It comprises 30 half-hour films across five seasons, with each season concentrating on a different approach to Chinese history and culture. Each episode exists in two versions, a Mandarin-language broadcast shown in the Chinese-speaking world, and an English-language version shown in other countries.

The programs were filmed entirely on location, with no studio work, using a roving film crew with a camera and drone. The presenters had radically different styles, with Yuan favoring an action-oriented approach as opposed to Clements's emphasis on anthropology. Both presenters, however, were "hands-on" participants in the rituals and events they witnessed, volunteering for wrestling matches, mountaineering, and odd foods. Since the entire series was sponsored by the Buick automobile company, Buick vehicles feature prominently in every episode, and several sequences appear to test the limits of the cars' off-road capabilities.

== Series 1 ==
The first season in 2015 sent explorer and photographer Harry Yuan on a journey that encompassed China's two greatest water-courses, the Yangtze and the Yellow River. His trip started in Shanghai but took him far into the Chinese hinterland, with sequences shot out in the Gobi Desert.

== Series 2 ==
For the second season of Route Awakening, broadcast in 2016, historian Jonathan Clements pursued a set of enduring cultural icons: tea, alcohol, cloth, grains, theater and pottery. Filming took place all over China, including the ethnic minority regions of Yunnan and the coasts of Fujian.

== Series 3 ==
In the third season, broadcast in 2017, Clements concentrated on five tribes from Chinese ethnic minorities: the Kam, Lisu, Gorlos Mongols, Naxi and Miao, with the Kam spanning two episodes. The emphasis was on the circle of life in village culture, the rituals associated with harvest, courting, and funerals.

== Series 4 ==
In the fourth season, broadcast in 2018, Yuan investigated the role of bridges in China's history, covering everything from the "wind-and-rain" sheltered bridges of Guizhou, to the most modern, high-tech spans under construction.

== Series 5 ==
In the fifth season, broadcast in 2019, Clements explored some of China's newest museums, showcasing the histories of the Dian Kingdom of Yunnan, the Shang dynasty in Anyang, Luoyang's history as a Chinese capital, the lost state of Yelang, and the golden treasures of the Marquis of Haihun.

== Reception ==
The first season of Route Awakening won several awards: a Silver World Medal for Best Editing at the New York Film Festival, a Gold Remi in the Culture/History category at the Houston Worldfest, and an Asian Television Award for Best Infotainment. The second season was nominated for an Asia Rainbow TV Award for Best TV Documentary, winning a Gold Remi for Best Information Series at the Houston International Film Festival and a Bronze World Medal at the New York Film Festival for Documentary: Cultural Issues.
