= San Francisco Japanese School =

Japanese school in California, US

- サンフランシスコ日本語補習校

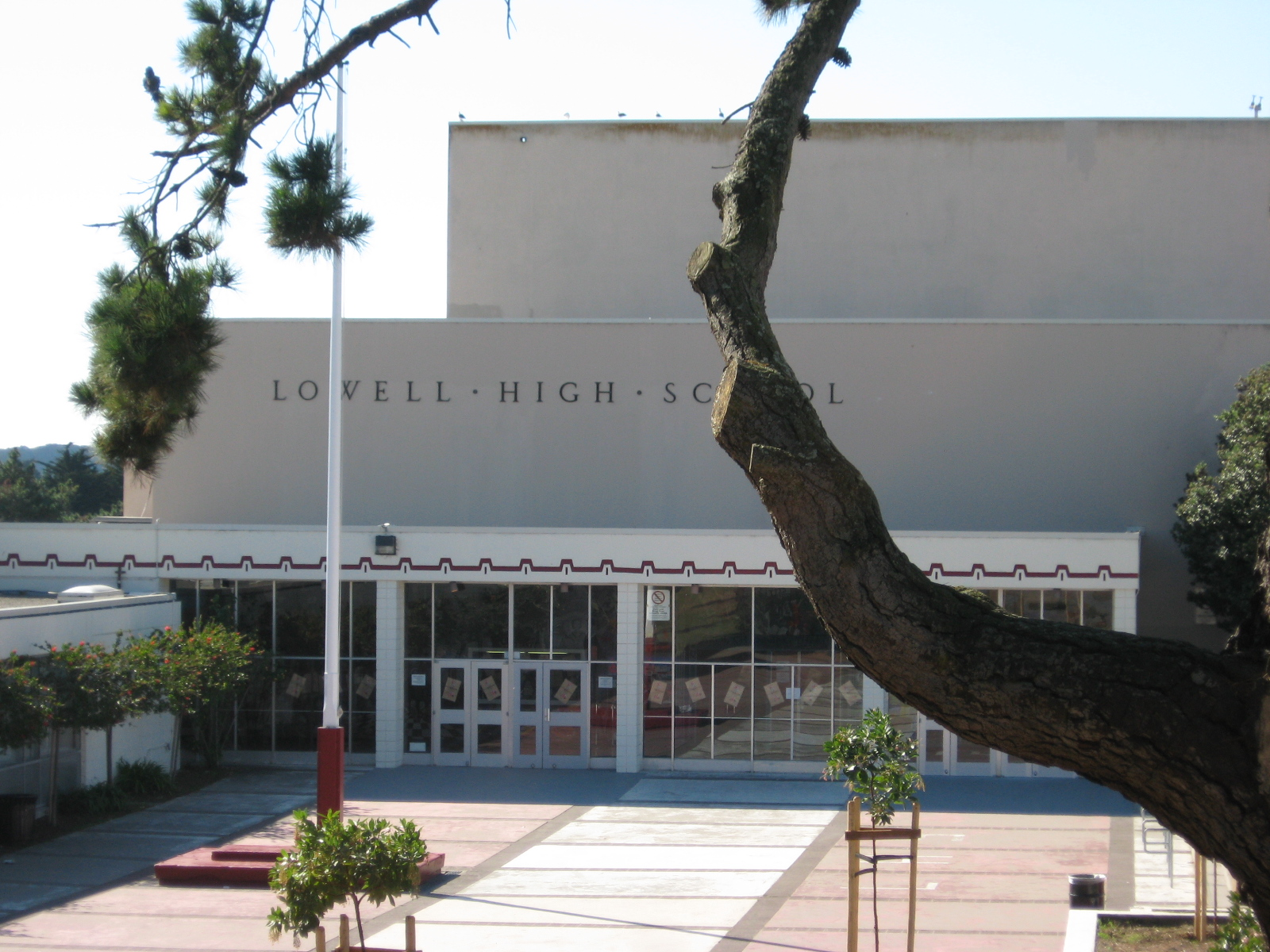
- The San Francisco Japanese School holds classes at Lowell High School San Francisco.
- San Francisco, CA 94111

Information
- Type: Private
- Established: 1968
- Grades: K-11
- Enrollment: 1,116 (2006)
- Website: San Francisco Japanese School

The San Francisco Japanese School (SFJS, San Furanshisuko Nihongo Hoshū Kō (サンフランシスコ日本語補習校) is a weekend Japanese school as well as a two-week summer school serving the San Francisco Bay Area. The system, with its administrative offices in San Francisco, is a 501(c)(3) non-profit organization, and was the world's second largest overseas Japanese weekend school in 2006. The school is supported by the Japanese government.

The SFJS rents classrooms in four schools serving a total of over 1,600 students as of 2016. The student body was 1,116 in 2006.

Two of the schools are in San Francisco and two are in the South Bay. For elementary students it operates out of the A. P. Giannini Middle School in San Francisco and Miller Middle School in San Jose. For junior high school and high school students it operates out of Lowell High School in San Francisco and the John F. Kennedy Middle School in Cupertino.

== History ==
The school was first established in 1968. The school previously had the English name San Francisco Japanese Language Class, Inc (SFJLC), and it previously held junior high and high school-level classes at Hyde Junior High School in Cupertino while its elementary level classes were out of Kennedy Middle. At a later point it previously held high school classes at Herbert Hoover Middle School in San Francisco.

As of 2006, there were increasing numbers of Japanese permanent residents and fewer numbers of Japanese temporary residents. The economic decline of Japan and the reduction in overseas corporate postings was the cause of the latter condition.

== See also ==
- History of the Japanese in San Francisco
- Japanese language education in the United States
