= Manga! Manga! The World of Japanese Comics =

1983 book by Frederik L. Schodt

- Author: Frederik L. Schodt
- Language: English
- Genre: Non-fiction
- Publisher: Kodansha
- Publication date: August 1, 1983

Manga! Manga! The World of Japanese Comics is a 1983 book by Frederik L. Schodt. Published by the Japanese publisher Kodansha, it was the first substantial English-language work on Japanese comics, or manga, as an artistic, literary, commercial, and sociological phenomenon. Part of Schodt's motivation for writing it was to introduce manga to English speakers. The book is copiously illustrated and features a foreword by Osamu Tezuka. It also includes translated excerpts from Tezuka's Phoenix, Keiji Nakazawa's Barefoot Gen, Riyoko Ikeda's The Rose of Versailles, and the Leiji Matsumoto short story "Ghost Warrior".

Manga! Manga! was enthusiastically reviewed in the mainstream and comics press and received a prominent endorsement from Stan Lee.

In 1996, Stone Bridge Press published Schodt's "sequel" to Manga! Manga!, Dreamland Japan. In the introduction to this book, Schodt states that a Japanese bistro in Berkeley, California, took its name from Manga! Manga!

== Contents ==
1. Foreword by Osamu Tezuka
2. A Thousand Million Manga
  1. Themes and Readers
  2. Reading, and the Structure of Narrative Comics
  3. Why Japan?
3. A Thousand Years of Manga
  1. The Comic Art Tradition
  2. Western Styles
  3. Safe and Unsafe Art
  4. Comics and the War Machine
  5. The Phoenix Becomes a Godzilla
4. The Spirit of Japan
  1. Paladins of the Past
  2. Modern-Day Warriors
  3. Samurai Sports
5. Flowers and Dreams
  1. Picture Poems
  2. Women Artists Take Over
  3. Sophisticated Ladies
6. The Economic Animal at Work and at Play
  1. Pride and Craftsmanship
  2. Mr. Lifetime Salary-Man
  3. Mah Jongg Wizards
7. Regulation versus Fantasy
  1. Is There Nothing Sacred?
  2. Social and Legal Restraints
  3. Erotic Comics
8. The Comics Industry
  1. Artists
  2. Publishers
  3. Profits
9. The Future
  1. The New Visual Generation
  2. Challenges for the Industry
  3. First Japan, Then the World?
