= Dreamland Japan =

Book by Frederik L. Schodt

- Author: Frederik L. Schodt
- Language: English
- Publisher: Stone Bridge Press
- Publication date: 1996

Dreamland Japan is a 1996 book by Frederik L. Schodt published by Stone Bridge Press that was intended as a "sequel" to Schodt's 1983 book Manga! Manga! The World of Japanese Comics. It includes information on several major manga magazines (including eight full-color pages of magazine covers) and manga writers and artists, including many who are little-known outside Japan. The book also includes an extensive chapter on manga "god" Osamu Tezuka and information on developments in manga that took place since the publication of Manga! Manga!, such as the use of manga as propaganda by the Aum Shinrikyo cult, the evolution of otaku culture, and the role of computers in manga creation.
