= Asahigraph =

Japanese pictorial magazine (1923–2000)

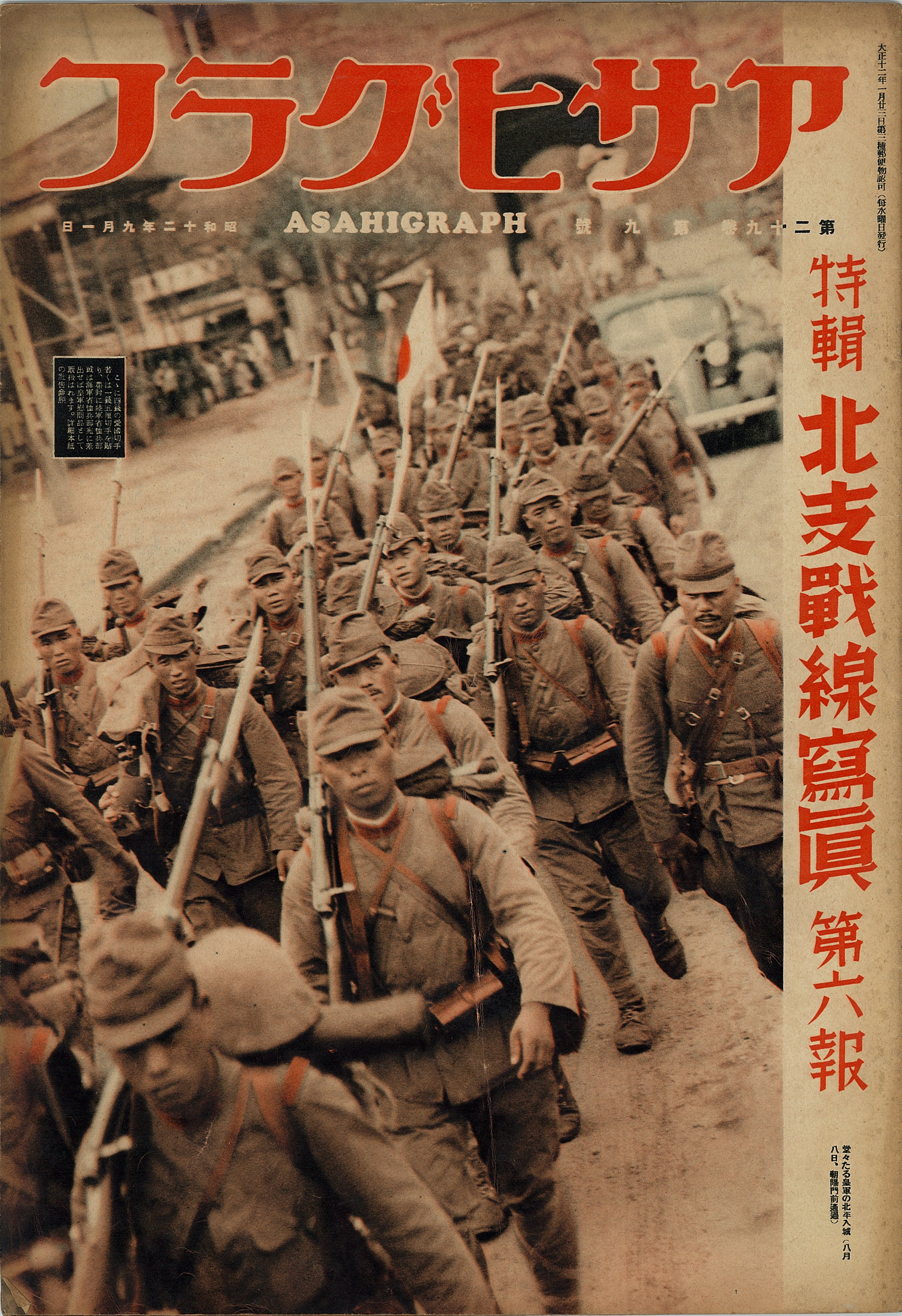
Asahigraph September 1937: Japanese troops in North China

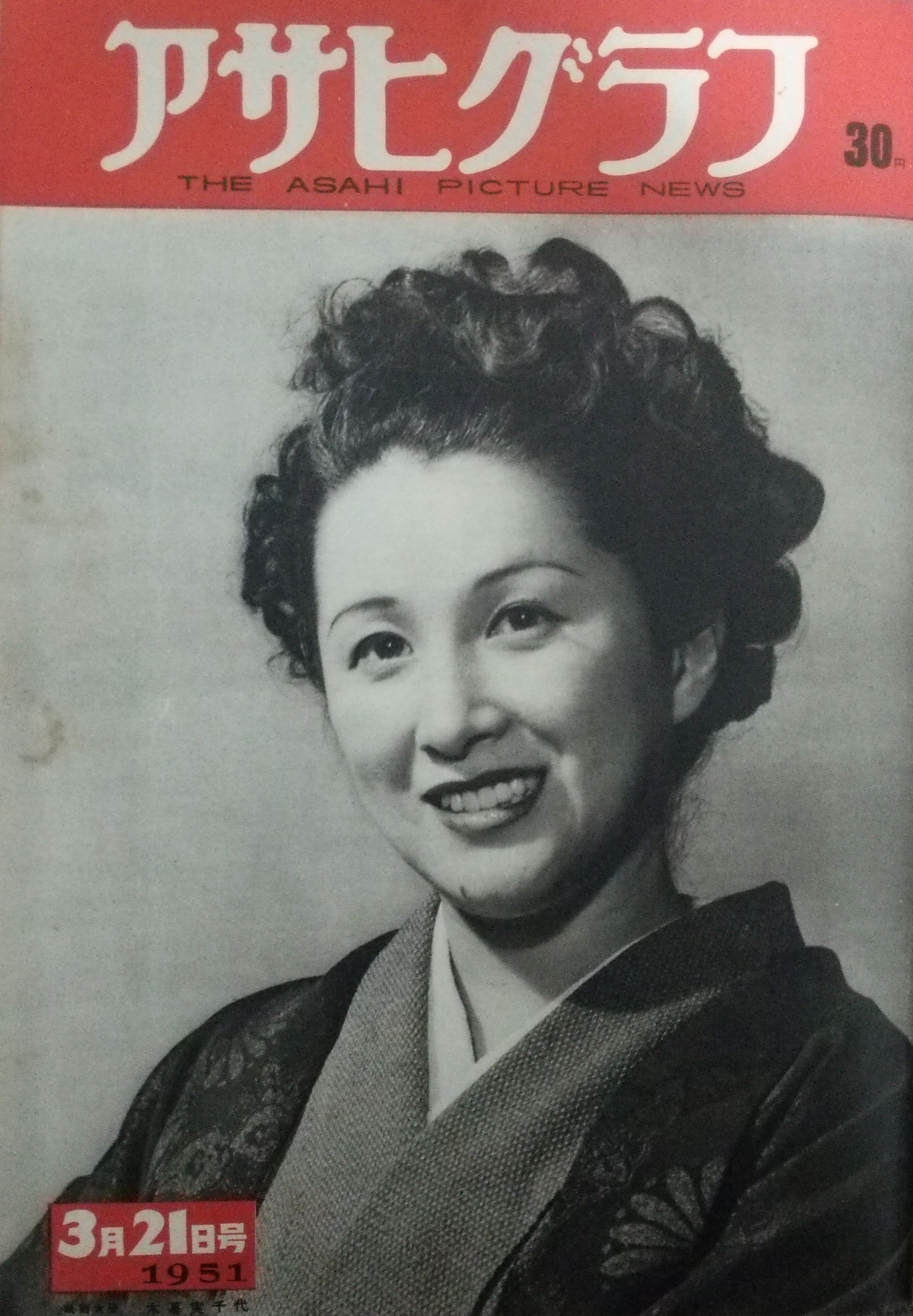
March 1951: Michiyo Kogure

Asahigraph (アサヒグラフ, Asahigurafu), also known as the Asahi Picture News, was a Japanese weekly pictorial magazine that ran from 1923 until 2000.

Asahigraph started on 25 January 1923 as a daily feature from Asahi Shinbunsha (publisher of Asahi Shimbun and soon also of Asahi Camera); this ran until 1 September 1923 when it was stopped by the major earthquake in Tokyo. It was back as a weekly from 14 November. In 1926 it was joined by Asahi Graphic (朝日グラフィック) which the Osaka branch of Asahi Shinbunsha had been publishing since 2 January 1921.

Asahigraph survived World War II and reemerged as something of a Japanese equivalent of the U.S. magazine Life. (Mainichi Graph, from Asahi's rival Mainichi Shinbunsha, was similar.) The last regular issue of the magazine is dated 13 October 2000.
