= Jonathan Clements =

British author and scriptwriter (born 1971)

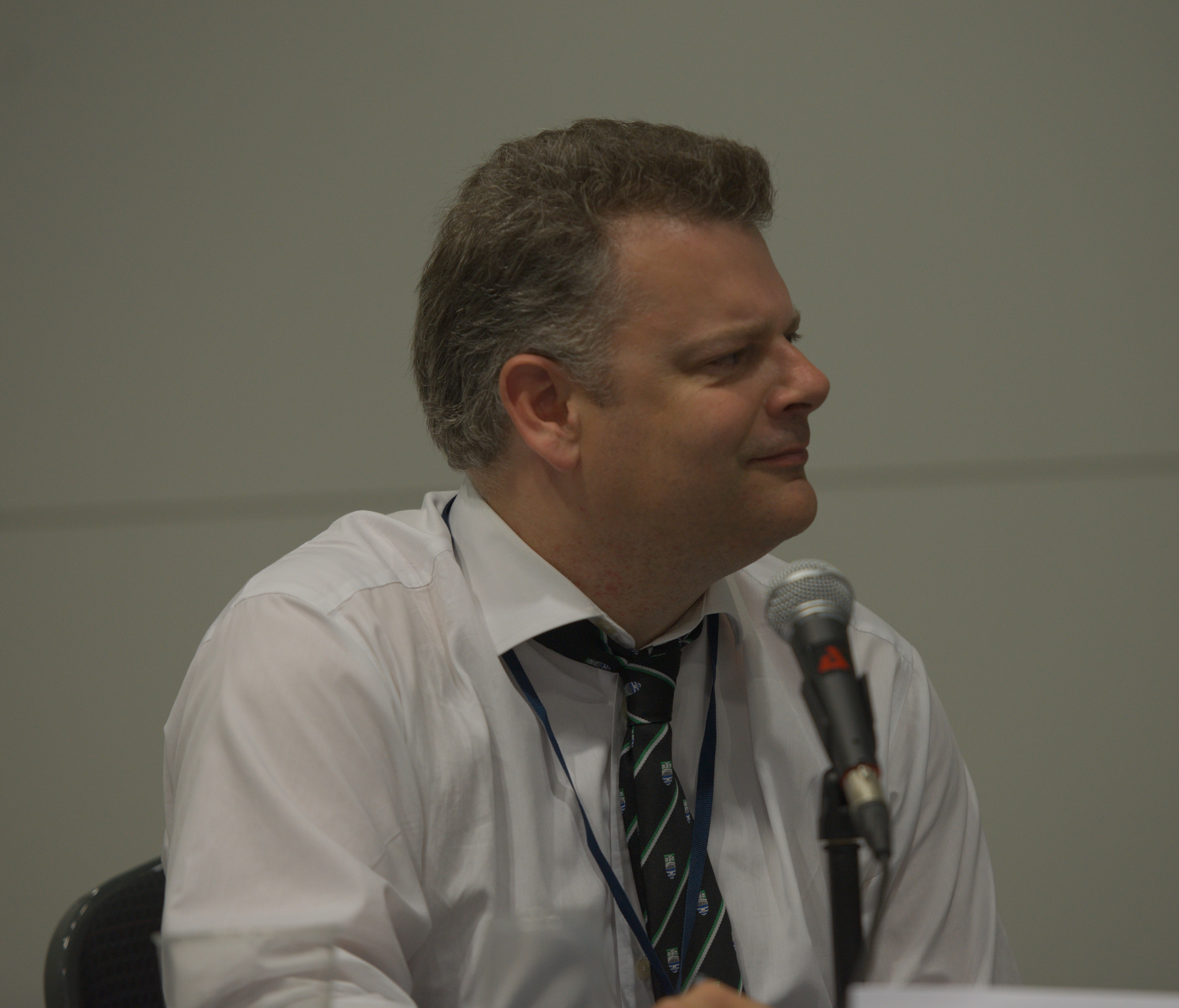
Jonathan Clements at Loncon.

Jonathan Michael Clements (born 9 July 1971) is a British author and scriptwriter. His non-fiction works include biographies of Confucius, Koxinga and Qin Shi Huang, as well as monthly opinion columns for Neo magazine. He is also the co-author of encyclopedias of anime and Japanese television dramas.

== Background ==
Clements speaks both Chinese and Japanese, and many of his works relate to East Asia. He wrote his master's degree at the University of Stirling on manga and anime exports, predicting the rise of several trends in the international industry including back-to-front printing, direct American investment in anime, and the proliferation of attempts to substitute non-Japanese products. Subsequently, he translated over 70 anime and manga works for British distributors, and worked as a voice director and actor. He wrote his PhD at the University of Wales on the industrial history of Japanese animation, later published by the British Film Institute as Anime: A History.

He served two years at Titan Books in London as the editor of Manga Max magazine, an experience he would later fictionalise as the Judge Dredd adventure Trapped on Titan. In 2000, he received the Japan Festival Award for Outstanding Contribution to the Understanding of Japanese Culture, specifically for his work on Manga Max.

== Broadcast work ==
Shortly after leaving the editorship of Manga Max magazine, he became a presenter on the Sci-Fi Channel's Japan-themed magazine show Saiko Exciting. He has been a consultant and talking head on numerous TV shows, including New Secrets of the Terracotta Warriors (Channel 4), Koxinga: Sailing into History (National Geographic), China's Jade Empire (Channel 4), and Chinese Chariot Revealed (PBS). In 2016, he became the presenter of three seasons of Route Awakening (National Geographic Asia), a series investigating the origins of several key Chinese cultural icons.

In 2019, he appeared on Christmas University Challenge as a member of the winning Leeds University team, alongside Henry Gee and Timothy Allen, captained by Richard Coles.

== Script work ==
Although Clements has written a couple of novels, much of his fiction work is CD audio drama or radio under the auspices of Big Finish Productions, including the Strontium Dog series, starring Simon Pegg, and the Doctor Who spin-off Sympathy for the Devil, starring David Warner and David Tennant.

- Down to Earth (London: Big Finish, 2002; web, BBCi, 2005) (Strontium Dog)
- Trapped on Titan (London: Big Finish, 2002) (Judge Dredd)
- Doctor Who Unbound: Sympathy for the Devil (London: Big Finish, 2003)
- Fire From Heaven (London: Big Finish, 2003 web, BBCi, 2005) (Strontium Dog)
- 99 Code Red (London: Big Finish, 2003) (Judge Dredd)
- Pre-Emptive Revenge (London: Big Finish, 2004) (Judge Dredd)
- Solo (London: Big Finish, 2005) (Judge Dredd)
- Snake Head (London: Big Finish, 2005) (Doctor Who: UNIT)
- Red Devils (London: Noise Monster, 2005) (Space 1889)
- Immortal Beloved (London: Big Finish, 2007; radio, BBC7, 2008) (Doctor Who)
- Brave New Town (London: Big Finish, 2008; radio, BBC7, 2009) (Doctor Who)
- The Destroyer of Delights (London: Big Finish, 2009) (Doctor Who)
- The Tiger's Tail (London: Big Finish, 2009) (Robin Hood)
- The Deer Hunters (London: Big Finish, 2009) (Robin Hood)
- Secret of the Sword (London: Big Finish, 2009) (Highlander)
- Survival of the Fittest (London: Big Finish, 2010; radio, BBC Radio 4 Extra, 2012) (Doctor Who)
- The Devil's Playground (London: Big Finish, 2010) (Judge Dredd)
- Year Zero (London: Big Finish, 2010) (Bernice Summerfield)
- Death Note: die hörspielreihe (Cologne: Lübbe Audio, 2018-19) (Death Note, 12-part series released in German and French)

Other work includes the script for the comic "'Tastes Like Chicken} in the Judge Dredd Megazine, as well as assorted short stories both there and in Doctor Who anthologies. His most famous work, Schoolgirl Milky Crisis, was the name for a fictional TV series that Clements often used in his Newtype USA columns in order to avoid breaking various non-disclosure agreements regarding real titles that he had worked on as a writer, director or translator. The name was later used as the title to a collection of Clements's articles and speeches.

== Books ==
Clements's many non-fiction publications, on subjects ranging from the history of the Vikings to the life of Chairman Mao Tse-tung, serve as research for his fiction. His books have been translated into a dozen languages, including Spanish, Portuguese, Dutch, and Korean. His major works include:

- The Moon in the Pines (2000, reprinted in paperback as Zen Haiku, 2007)
- The Anime Encyclopedia: A Guide to Japanese Animation Since 1917 (1st ed. 2001, 2nd ed. 2006, 3rd ed. 2015; with Helen McCarthy)
- The Dorama Encyclopedia: A Guide to Japanese TV Drama Since 1953 (2003, with Motoko Tamamuro)
- The Pirate King: Coxinga and the Fall of the Ming Dynasty (2004, publ. in paperback as Coxinga, 2005)
- Confucius: A Biography (2004, expanded 2nd ed. 2017)
- A Brief History of the Vikings (2005)
- The First Emperor of China (2006, 2nd ed. 2015)
- Wu (2007, 2nd ed. 2014)
- Beijing: The Biography of a City (2008, 2nd ed. as An Armchair Traveller's History of Beijing, 2016; 3rd ed. as A Short History of Beijing, 2022)
- Mannerheim: President, Soldier, Spy (2009)
- A Brief History of the Samurai (2010)
- Admiral Togo: Nelson of the East (2010)
- A Brief History of Khubilai Khan (2010)
- Sun Tzu's Art of War: A New Translation (2012)
- An Armchair Traveller's History of the Silk Road (2013)
- Anime: A History (2013, 2nd ed. 2023)
- An Armchair Traveller's History of Finland (2014, 2nd ed. as A Short History of Finland, 2022)
- Christ's Samurai: The True Story of the Shimabara Rebellion (2016)
- A Brief History of the Martial Arts (2016)
- A Brief History of Japan: Samurai, Shōgun and Zen: The Extraordinary Story of the Land of the Rising Sun (2017)
- A Brief History of China: Dynasty, Revolution and Transformation: From the Middle Kingdom to the People's Republic (2019)
- The Emperor's Feast: A History of China in Twelve Meals (2021)
- Japan at War in the Pacific: The Rise and Fall of the Japanese Empire in Asia (1868–1945) (2022)
- Rebel Island: The Incredible History of Taiwan (2024)

In 2011, he became a contributing editor to The Encyclopedia of Science Fiction 3rd edition, with special responsibility for Chinese and Japanese entries.
