= American Journal of Chinese Studies =

- Discipline: Political science, international relations, economics
- Language: English
- Edited by: Edward A. McCord

Publication details
- Former names: Digest of Social Science Research on China; Digest of Chinese Studies; Journal of Chinese Studies
- History: 1984–present
- Publisher: American Association for Chinese Studies (United States)
- Frequency: Biannually

Standard abbreviations
- ISO 4: Am. J. Chin. Stud.

Indexing
- ISSN: 0742-5929
- JSTOR: amerjchinstud
- ISSN: 2166-0042

Links
- Journal homepage

The American Journal of Chinese Studies is a peer-reviewed academic journal published by the American Association for Chinese Studies. It covers research in all social science disciplines "dealing with Taiwan, China and locales with significant Chinese population or influence."

== Abstracting and indexing ==
The journal is abstracted and indexed in

- America: History & Life
- Historical Abstracts
- International Political Science Abstracts
- Bibliography of Asian Studies
- MLA Bibliography

== See also ==
- Chiang Ching-kuo Foundation
