= Harvard Asia Pacific Review =

Coordinates: 42°22′40.2″N 71°6′47.5″W

- Discipline: International relations
- Language: English
- Edited by: Andrew Badger, Tian Wang

Publication details
- History: 1996-present
- Publisher: Harvard University (United States)
- Frequency: Biannually
- Open access: Yes

Standard abbreviations
- ISO 4: Harv. Asia Pac. Rev.

Indexing
- ISSN: 1522-1113
- LCCN: 97652813
- OCLC no.: 712564639

Links
- Journal homepage; Online access; Online archive

The Harvard Asia Pacific Review is a biannual academic journal covering the Asia-Pacific Region and edited by students at Harvard University. The journal solicits contributions from scholars, politicians, businessmen and cultural figures in and about the Asia-Pacific region. It was established in 1996 by Una Dean and Kathrine Meyers.
