= Frederik L. Schodt =

American translator, interpreter, and writer (born 1950)

- Born: January 22, 1950 (age 76)
- Occupations: Translator; writer; conference interpreter

Frederik L. Schodt (born January 22, 1950) is an American translator, interpreter, and writer.

== Biography ==
Schodt's father was in the US foreign service, and he grew up in Norway, Australia, and Japan. The family first went to Japan in 1965 when Schodt was fifteen. They left in 1967, but Schodt remained to graduate from American School in Japan in Tokyo in 1968. After entering the University of California, Santa Barbara (UCSB), in 1970, Schodt returned to Japan and studied Japanese intensively at International Christian University (ICU) for a year and half. He graduated from UCSB in 1972, and after a brief bohemian stint at a variety of jobs and traveling, he became a tour guide in Los Angeles for Japanese tourists, also escorting them to Canada and Mexico. After trying to interpret for a group once at Sunkist, he realized that he could become an interpreter, but needed further training. In 1975, he was awarded a scholarship from Japan's Ministry of Education, to return to ICU and study translation and interpreting. After finishing his studies at ICU in 1977, he began working in the translation department of Simul International, in Tokyo. In mid-1978, he returned to the United States, and since then has worked in San Francisco as a freelance writer, translator, and interpreter.

While working in Tokyo in 1977, he joined with several university friends in contacting Tezuka Productions. They sought permission to translate the Phoenix comic into English.

Schodt is notable in manga and anime fandom for his translations of works such as Osamu Tezuka's Phoenix, Tezuka's Astro Boy, Riyoko Ikeda's The Rose of Versailles, Keiji Nakazawa's Barefoot Gen, Henry Yoshitaka Kiyama's The Four Immigrants Manga, and others.

His best known book is Manga! Manga! The World of Japanese Comics, published in 1983 and reprinted several times, with an introduction by Tezuka.

Manga! Manga! won a prize at the Manga Oscar Awards in 1983. Furthermore, in 2000 Schodt was awarded the Asahi Shimbun's Tezuka Osamu Cultural Prize "Special Prize" for his outstanding contribution to the appreciation of manga worldwide.

== Honors ==
- 1983 – Japan Cartoonists Association's Manga Oscar, Special Award, for Manga! Manga! The World of Japanese Comics.
- 2000 – Asahi Shimbun's Tezuka Osamu Cultural Prize "Special Prize" for outstanding contribution to the appreciation of manga worldwide.
- 2009 – 旭日小綬章. Order of the Rising Sun, Gold Rays with Rosette.
- 2009 – Japan Ministry of Foreign Affairs International Manga Award, Special Category, for helping to promote manga overseas.
- 2013 – Circus Historical Society's Stuart Thayer Prize for superior work, for Professor Risley and the Imperial Japanese Troupe.
- 2016 – Ranald MacDonald Award for Lifetime Achievement, especially for work, Native American in the Land of the Shogun: Ranald MacDonald and the Opening of Japan.
- 2017 – Japan Foundation Award.
- 2022 - Tom Spurgeon Award at CXC (Cartoon Crossroads Columbus).
- 2024 - Inducted into the American Manga Awards Publishing Hall of Fame - Anime NYC.
- 2025 -Awarded trophy as translator-member of Studio Proteus, which was inducted into the American Manga Awards Publishing Hall of Fame, at Anime NYC.

== Selected works ==
Schodt has written eight books, translated several novels and manga, and published articles and columns in such newspapers and periodicals as Mainichi Daily News, The Japan Times, Anzen, Mangajin, Japan Related, Animag, Animerica and others.

- Manga! Manga! The World of Japanese Comics. Kodansha International, 1983.
- Inside the Robot Kingdom: Japan, Mechatronics, and the Coming Robotopia. Kodansha International, 1988. (ISBN 0-87011-854-4)
- America and the Four Japans: Friend, Foe, Model, Mirror. Stone Bridge Press, 1994.
- Dreamland Japan: Writings on Modern Manga. Stone Bridge Press, 1996.
- Native American in the Land of the Shogun: Ranald MacDonald and the Opening of Japan. Stone Bridge Press, 2003.
- The Astro Boy Essays: Osamu Tezuka, Mighty Atom, and the Manga/Anime Revolution. Stone Bridge Press, 2007 (ISBN 978-1933330549)
- Professor Risley and the Imperial Japanese Troupe. Stone Bridge Press, 2012 (ISBN 978-1-61172-009-9)
- Astro Boy (translator)
- Phoenix (translator)
- Pluto (translator)
- The Ghost in the Shell/Ghost in the Shell 2: Man-Machine Interface/Ghost in the Shell 1.5: Human-Error Processor (translator)
- The Osamu Tezuka Story (translator)
- The Rose of Versailles (translator)
- Gaku Stories (translator)
- My Heart Sutra: A World in 260 Characters Stone Bridge Press, 2020.
