= Stone Bridge Press =

American publisher on Japanese topics

- Founded: 1989
- Founder: Peter Goodman
- Country of origin: United States
- Headquarters location: Berkeley, California
- Distribution: Consortium Book Sales and Distribution
- Key people: Peter Goodman, President
- Publication types: Books
- Nonfiction topics: Japan and Asia
- Official website: www.stonebridge.com

Stone Bridge Press, Inc. is a publishing company distributed by Consortium Book Sales & Distribution and founded in 1989. Authors published include Donald Richie and Frederik L. Schodt. Stone Bridge publishes books related to Japan, having published some 90 books on a wide variety of subjects: anime and manga, calligraphy, and origami; guides on Japanese customs, culture, and aesthetics; Japanese language books, Japan-related fiction, poetry, and nonfiction. Recently, Stone Bridge has broadened its subjects to more of Asia, and have published books on Korea and China, as well.

== History ==
Stone Bridge Press was founded in 1989 by Peter Goodman. Seventeen years later in 2005, Goodman sold the press to Japanese book distributor Yohan Inc. Shortly before Yohan Inc. announced their bankruptcy in July 2008, Stone Bridge was bought by IBC (Intercultural Book Company) Publishing of Tokyo, a former Yohan subsidiary. In Fall 2009, Goodman reacquired Stone Bridge from IBC. They are now an independent press.

== Published authors ==
- Jonathan Clements
- Liza Dalby
- Leza Lowitz
- Naoki Inose
- Helen McCarthy
- Donald Richie
- Hiroaki Sato
- Frederick L. Schodt

== Notable publications ==
- The Astro Boy Essays
- The Donald Richie Reader
- Dreamland Japan: Writings on Modern Manga
- The Four Immigrants Manga
- Persona: A Biography of Yukio Mishima
