= MHZ (disambiguation) =

MHz is the International Standard symbol for megahertz.

MHZ is the IATA airport code for RAF Mildenhall in Suffolk, England.

MHz may also refer to:

- "MHz" (episode), an episode of the Paranoia Agent anime series
- MHz Legacy, an American hip hop group formerly known as MHz
- MHz myth, referring to the clock speed of computers
- MHz Networks
- MHz WorldView

== See also ==
- Megahertz (disambiguation)
