= Seraphim: 266613336 Wings =

Japanese manga series

セラフィム 2億6661万3336の翼 (Seraphim: 2-oku 6661-man 3336 no Tsubasa)
- Manga
- Written by: Mamoru Oshii; Satoshi Kon
- Illustrated by: Satoshi Kon
- Published by: Tokuma Shoten
- English publisher: Dark Horse Comics
- Magazine: Animage
- Original run: March 1994 – November 1995
- Volumes: 1

Seraphim: 266613336 Wings (Japanese: セラフィム 2億6661万3336の翼, Hepburn: Seraphim: 2-oku 6661-man 3336 no Tsubasa) is an unfinished Japanese manga series by Mamoru Oshii and Satoshi Kon. The story is set in a post-apocalyptic world bent by a disease called "angel disease" that is decimating the population, and centers on the journey of two men and a dog, called "Magi", and a girl they escort, Sera, sent by the World Health Organization (WHO) to an area of Central Asia where the outbreak is believed to be located. Enemies and conspiracies await them along the way.

Commissioned in 1994 by Animage to replicate the success of the serialization of Hayao Miyazaki's Nausicaä of the Valley of the Wind, the work was serialized from March 1994 to November 1995, when it was discontinued due to both authors abandoning the project.

== Plot ==
Like all other omens, this one manifested itself without anyone noticing. By the time people noticed it, it was too late. The disease first showed itself in the early 21st century in a desolate place on the Eurasian continent. Suddenly it spread everywhere coming to affect the human race in its entirety. It was an incurable disease. It drove people to death, afflicting them with fierce delusions and deforming their diseased bodies. Entire countries disappeared without anyone being able to do anything about it. The more developed ones blocked access to refugees coming from the contaminated places. [...] The so-called "bird disease" took humankind where no one could have imagined.

— From the introductory poster of the Italian edition

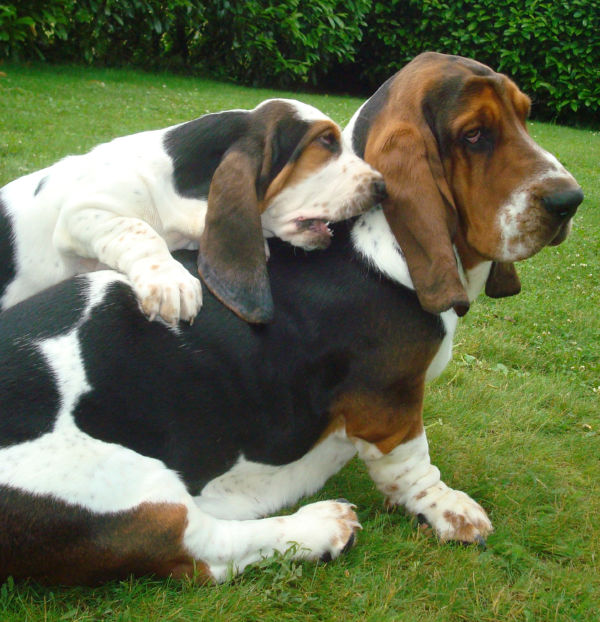
An adult Basset Hound very similar to Gaspar

In a world in which the "angel disease" (天使病, Tenshi-byō), or "Seraphim" (セラフィム, Serafimu), has brought entire nations to ruin and is exterminating most of the population, the World Health Organization decides to send Sera (セラ), a mute little girl found in one of the Asian villages decimated by the epidemic, across the cordon sanitaire separating the more advanced states from the contaminated ones, to learn more about the disease. As companions are chosen Erasmus (エラズマス, Erazumasu), an elderly English biologist and former inquisitor who had quit his job in protest against the association's preventive measures, "Jacob who destroys countries" (「国殺しのヤコブ」, Kuni-goroshi no Yakobu), an Australian doctor, United Nations High Commissioner for Refugees and responsible for closing numerous territories and redistributing refugees, and a large Basset Hound. They are given the names of the Three Magi (マギ, Magi), also nicknamed "Three Wise Men" (「三賢者」, San kenja), respectively Balthazar (バルタザル, Barutazaru), Melchior (メルキオル, Merukioru), and Gaspar (ガスパル, Gasuparu). Thus, escorted past the cordon sanitaire by a group of army aviators to the city of Shenzhen, designated a "Special Economic Zone", they go to a massive tulou, refurbished in such a way that it can cope, via machine-gun turrets, with the flocks of infection-carrying birds. They are welcomed by Ye (イェ), governor and deputy of the Hakka triad that commands the fortress. The latter shows Melchior and Balthazar a rare example of a patient in the last stage of illness, found in the Taklamakan desert, where he was worshipped as a deity. To go there, the Magi and Sera (mistaken by the people for the goddess Mazu) must travel on the Trans-Siberian Railway, avoiding the eastern nations in constant civil strife; they are then escorted to board a military ship provided by the federal democratic republic of Huanan, bound for Shanghai. However, they are suddenly approached by a boat of refugees, who kidnap the young girl and drug Balthazar. After the incident, the Magi decide, led by a young man named Zhou Zuoyoung (邹邹永, Zōu Zōu Yǒng), to go and rescue her.

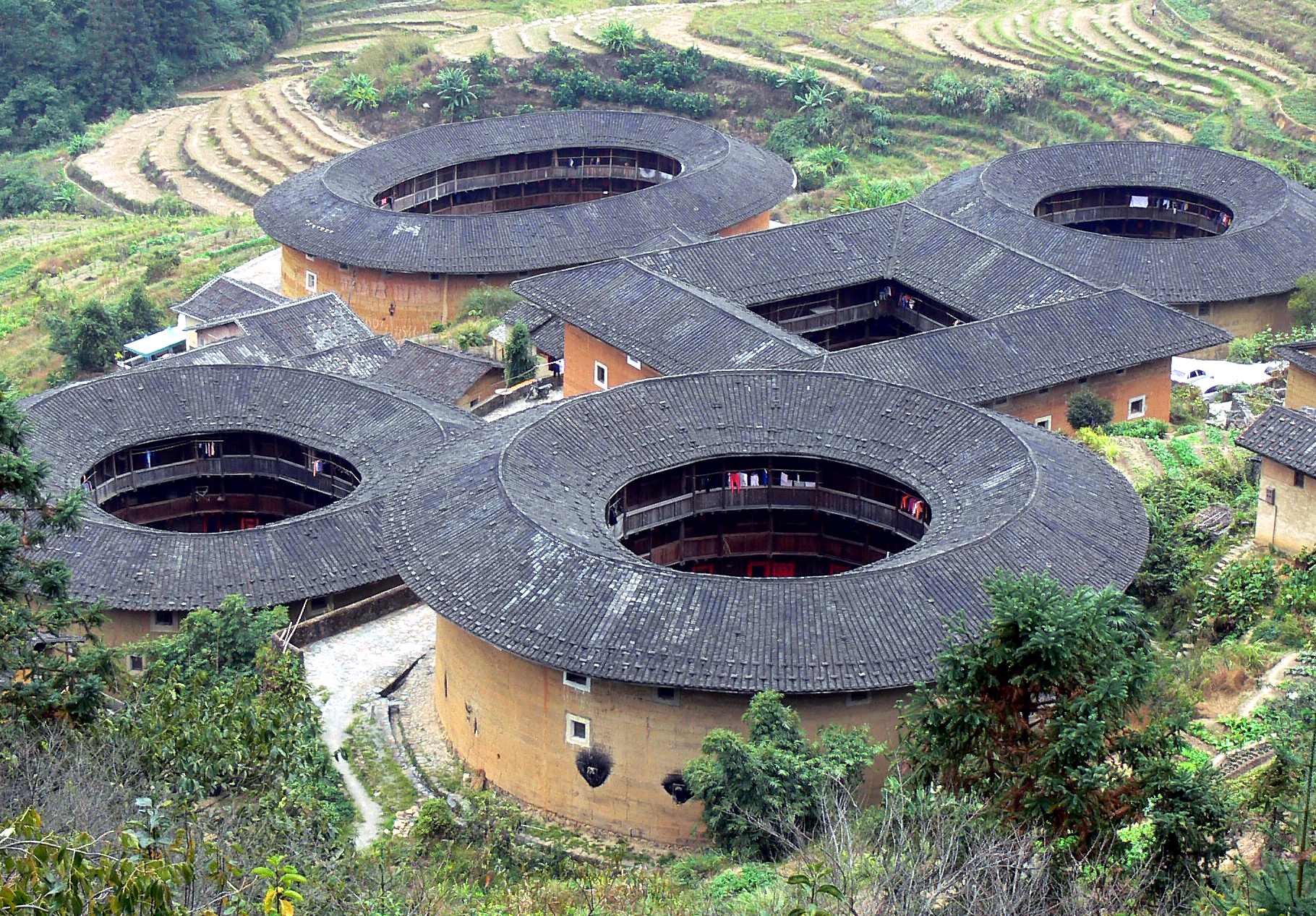
Some tulou, of the same type as those depicted in the manga

Having landed in Shanghai, which has been reduced to rubble and subjugated to a handful of fanatical inquisitors operating outside the WHO guidelines, they are betrayed by Zhou and Balthazar is captured. Melchior, on the other hand, manages to escape the inquisitors' thugs and, aided by a woman who heads a rebel group, hatches a plan to rescue his comrades. During the ceremony in which Sera is tied to a crucifix to be burned at the stake, he contacts Captain Huang, who fires surface-to-air missiles at the inquisitors' building, killing them. In the ensuing turmoil, the Magi and the child are reunited and, escorted by the woman, go to Nanjing. There Melchior suffers the first symptoms of "angel sickness", and although he realizes that the little girl can mysteriously cure him, he still wants to hurry to reach the Taklamakan desert via an airship, abandoned but functioning. With the departure of the group, the manga comes to a halt.

== Production ==
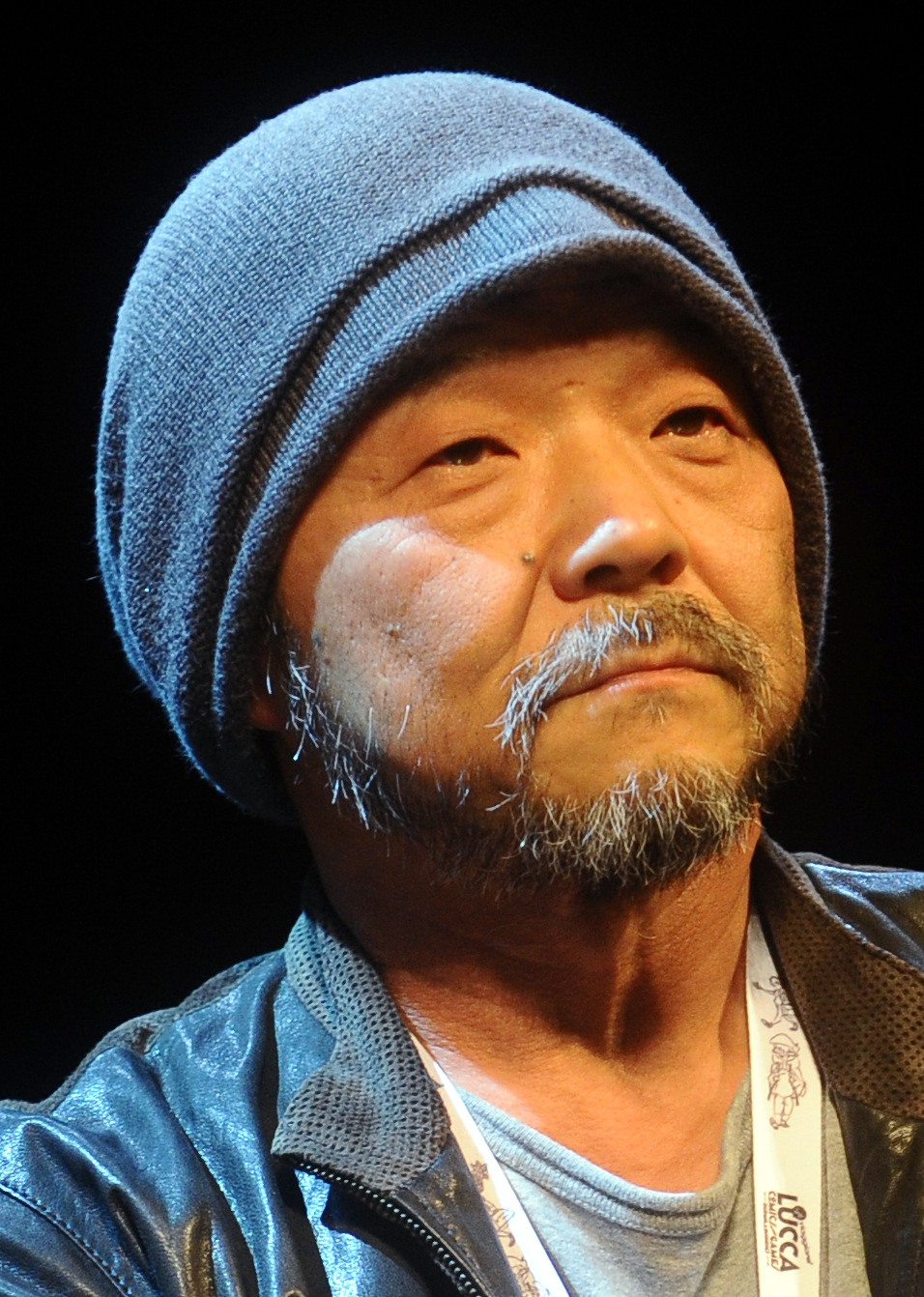
"Of all the work I have done in my life, this is my most ambitious one." – Mamoru Oshii

By March 1994, the serialization of Nausicaä of the Valley of the Wind, the manga written and illustrated by Hayao Miyazaki, which had begun in February 1982, had ended, and the editorial department of the magazine that had published it, Animage, set out to find another work that could match its success. Mamoru Oshii was approached to do this work, and he came to the editorial department with a prologue ready and already having outlined in his mind the geopolitics of the world in which the story would take place. As editor Paolo Pederzini wrote in the afterword of the edition published in Italy by Planet Manga: "He said that with Seraphim he would surpass himself. They said that the presentation of the project was exceptional, that it conveyed all of Oshii's enthusiasm. It was presented as a long work that also included the eventual making of a film." As designer, he thought of hiring Satoshi Kon, with whom he had collaborated the year before on Patlabor 2: The Movie, giving him the role of layout artist (i.e., a more precise and detailed version of the storyboard). The latter instead remained much more cautious:

Regarding this new serialization with Oshii, I want to take our time, and work slowly and carefully.

— Satoshi Kon

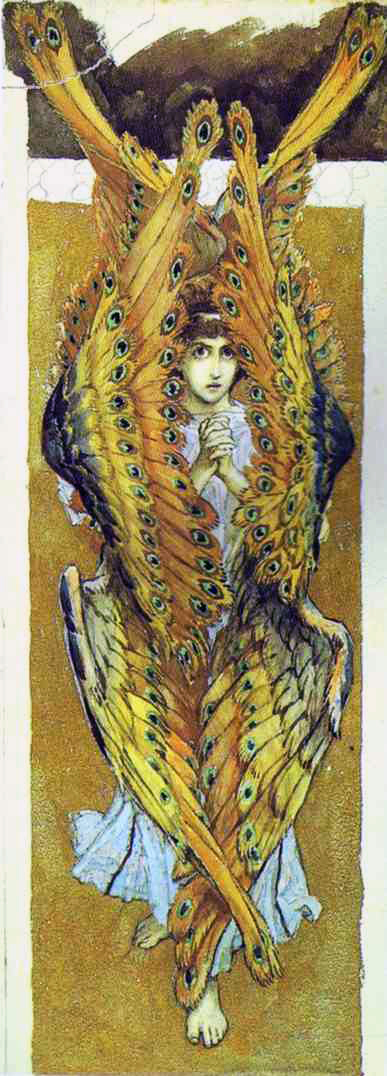
Depiction of a seraph by Viktor Mikhaylovich Vasnetsov

They met almost daily to discuss the illustrations, choosing and planning every detail and frame. Over time, this process involved the actual story and Kon also began to express himself on narrative junctures. His suggestions were integrated by Oshii into the script, resulting in a "unique, fascinating and detailed world with no obvious distinction between the work of the two men". However, this modus operandi probably led to arguments that later drove the writers apart, leading to a hiatus of the series after sixteen chapters, in November 1995. In this regard, neither of the two explained what really triggered the breakup. Oshii stated, "I don't want to talk about it too much [...] I stopped fighting with the illustrator, and that's it". Kon, on the other hand, said via his website that "with a story that did not progress and a scenario that had only explanations, I tried to incite the original author on the path of [more] entertainment, but Mr. [Oshii] ran away". Furthermore, within his Opus, published between 1995 and 1996, he referred to the manga by saying:

Seraphim has also been suspended. But that manga is like a child who does not look like his parents.

— Satoshi Kon, Opus, Final chapter

Although the artists had reconnected in the following years, going so far as to work in 2007 with other directors (including Makoto Shinkai, Mahiro Maeda, and Shōji Kawamori) on an anthology series of small shorts for NHK entitled Ani*Kuri 15 (アニ＊クリ15), they never picked up the series again; and with Kon's death on August 24, 2010, from pancreatic cancer, the possibility of seeing it completed was gone. In 2011, Oshii, who had meanwhile reused some elements of the work for the 1996 project G.R.M. – The Record of Garm War (G.R.M. ガルムウォーズ, G. R. M. Garumuu~ōzu) (which was in turn discontinued and revived only in 2012 to become the live-action feature film Garm Wars: The Last Druid, released in 2014), published an appendix to the March issue of Monthly Comic Ryū, San kenja reihai-hen (三賢者礼拝篇), (Note: Literally, "The worship of the three sages".) illustrated by Katsuya Terada (who had worked for him as character designer for the 2000 anime Blood: The Last Vampire) and for the bunkobon of the same name. It was to serve as a prologue to the novel Seraphim: 266613336 Wings, which was to be released in spring 2012 and of which, however, nothing more was announced.

== Distribution ==
Animage released chapters of Seraphim: 266613336 Wings from May 1994 (publishing the Prologue) to November 1995. During this time frame, the credits changed as Kon's involvement in the project increased: up to the twelfth episode it read "drawings by Satoshi Kon, story by Mamoru Oshii", while from the thirteenth to the sixteenth it read "by Satoshi Kon – Original Story: Mamoru Oshii". The chapters were unnamed, except for the first, which bore the subtitle "Inquisitors – Magi", and the last three, in which the caption "Second Series" was inserted.

In mid-October 2010, Tokuma Shoten included with issue 50 of Monthly Comic Ryū a special album with the first three chapters of the manga to anticipate its December 4 single tankōbon release in a limited print run, followed by another with a wider circulation on December 13. In Italy it was published on November 13, 2013, by Panini Comics through the Planet Manga label, edited by Paolo Pederzini, in a box set with Opus, another manga (reprinted for the first time in volume also by Tokuma on December 13) written and drawn by Kon alone and published from October 1995 to June 1996 in Comic Guide by Gakken. For the English-language market, it was released by Dark Horse Comics on March 10, 2015, in a 268-page version in which there are appendix writings by Takashi Watanabe (editor of the work) and Carl Gustav Horn (essayist and editor).

== Reception ==
Seraphim: 266613336 Wings was received overall positively by the critics who reviewed it. Hans Rollmann of the webzine PopMatters gave it eight out of ten stars, writing that "The manga is everything one would imagine a creative collaboration between these two masters of the genre to be. It's a sweeping and imaginative dystopian adventure. [...] What's the point of reading an unfinished comic? What does exist is a wonderful work, and the reader is quickly enraptured by the beautifully illustrated dystopia, the complexity and believability of its post-apocalyptic order, the mystery of what has happened, the rich historical and religious symbolism, the detailed plot that slowly unfolds and the characters whose compelling personalities gradually emerge". Similarly, Andrew Tran of Overmental awarded it an 8.0/10.0, considering it "as a very impersonal, cold book, with its eye unwaveringly trained towards a dark vision that will never see completion, but it's definitely a vision worth exploring". Nick Smith of the critics' site ICv2, although giving it a score of four out of five stars, stated, "While technically outstanding, and an oddly important part of the history of both manga and anime, this is still a never-to-be-completed fragment of a much longer story, and will frustrate readers who might want to find out what should have come next. Thus, it may have limited appeal".

== Critical analysis ==
=== Symbolism ===
"The WHO, in the future of this manga, seems to have adopted the style and mannerisms of a religious order of centuries past, capable of conducting inquisitions and commanding military resources. This bizarre re-imagining of WHO [...] can in part be seen as an entrapment of a postapocalyptic story." – Carl Gustav Horn

According to Carl Gustav Horn (in the afterword "Animage, Mamoru Oshii, and Satoshi Kon"), the manga has some references to an earlier work by Oshii, Angel's Egg (天使のたまご, Tenshi no Tamago), a 1985 original video animation made in collaboration with the illustrator Yoshitaka Amano: for example, the image of the phylogenetic tree (also exploited for 1995's Ghost in the Shell), depicted behind a statue of Charles Darwin in the museum (recalling the Natural History Museum in London) where Dr. Erasmus works and which in the anime was carved inside the Ark where the little girl protagonist lives; Sera herself seems to be based on the latter, "with her heavy upward gaze," as are the bird hunters in the tulou, compared with the fishermen in the feature film.

Additionally, the two works also resemble each other in terms of the religious references they contain: the name of the disease, Seraphim, is the plural of the word seraph, the heavenly spirit at the head of the hierarchy of angels; moreover, the male protagonists are named after the Magi, and the WHO envoys "Inquisitors". (Note: Marco Broggini, a journalist for the webzine Stay Nerd, wrote in his article "'The Siren's Lineage' and Kon Satoshi's major works": In Seraphim the topos of the unscrupulous adult is covered by the Inquisitors [...]. They are supposed to guarantee peace, but end up exterminating entire populations on the basis of unfounded suspicions in order to maintain power. Kon certainly took inspiration from the dark ages of witch hunts and heresies.) Dr. Erasmus then quotes the gospels several times (such as those of Luke and Matthew), and Sera is compared to Mazu, representing a Messiah for the Hakka people, whose history "is a continuous search for a place in the world, much like that of the people of Israel". Andrew Tran asserted:

Does it look like anything Satoshi Kon or Mamoru Oshii have done before? Surprisingly, I'd say no, not at all – the apocalyptic, semi-mystical feel has much more in common with Neon Genesis Evangelion and Akira, the former for its use of mythologized Christian terms and themes, and the latter for its depressingly believable vision of the future.

— Andrew Tran

The number 266,613,336 that appears in the title is an esoteric number: by dividing it by 2, which is the pair of wings referred to in the term wings, the result is 133,306,668, which according to medieval tradition, attributed to the 13th-century Portuguese scholar Peter of Spain and also found in the treatises of the Spanish Franciscan Catholic bishop Alonso de Espina (died 1491), would indicate the total number of angels who sided with Lucifer and were cast out of Heaven.

=== Nausicaä of the Valley of the Wind and Neon Genesis Evangelion ===
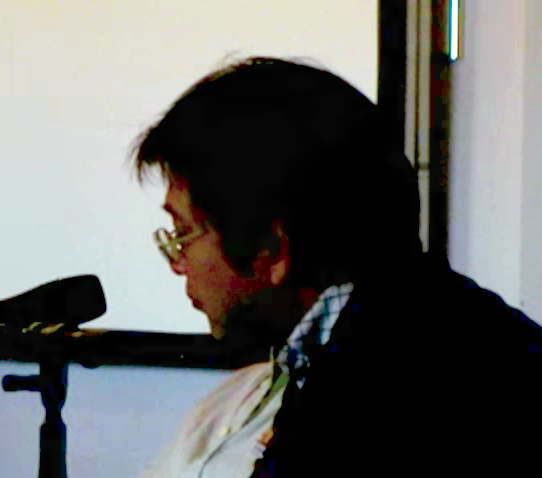
Yoshiyuki Sadamoto in 2007

Horn argues that the manga "might indeed be very reminiscent of Nausicaa, an extraordinary young woman, seen as a savior prophesied by some, of travels in a post-apocalyptic world still torn down by sectarian conflict, accompanied by older men as her protectors". Nonetheless, it differs from it in several respects: Miyazaki's work is set in the distant future and reflects on politics but without being realistic, while Oshii and Kon's, in addition to taking place in a near-contemporary historical moment, consists of meticulous references to existing social elements, such as the Triads of the Hakka people or the presence of the WHO.

The contrast lies as much in the art as in the story. Nausicaa's unruled panel borders, its sepia ink, the soft line of its character drawings, the rounded and organic look even of its machines, give a suggestion of handcraft and folklore befitting Miyazaki's aesthetics. Kon's art in Seraphim took inspiration from Katsuhiro Otomo's oddly radical character realism [...] Nausicaa [is] a work of fiction—but if Miyazaki shaped his narrative by molding a fantasy, Oshii defined his by choosing to cut a certain shape out of a larger reality.

— Carl Gustav Horn

Horn added that "some readers may also be familiar with the mention in Seraphim of the Schumann resonance", which would be a plot hinge in another later notable anime TV series of the 1990s, Serial Experiments Lain.

Another parallel is drawn with the anime Neon Genesis Evangelion, which is similar in themes (from man's evolution to his lust for power), references to Christianity and which aired almost concurrently with the cessation of the serialization of the manga. Horn relates how the staff of Animerica magazine was advancing the hypothesis that Seraphim: 266613336 Wings had inspired Hideaki Anno's series, as both feature angels as a "sinister, apocalyptic motif" and a worldwide humanitarian organization that has become a cult of sorts (the World Health Organization on one side, the Seele on the other). Gainax members read Animage and knew the two authors: Oshii either because of his reputation within the studio (which he had supported when it was still called Daicon Film by offering it film equipment) or because some of them had worked for him years earlier (e.g., Yoshiyuki Sadamoto had been a key animator on 1985's Angel's Egg), while Kon had been hired to make preparatory sketches in 1992 for the animated film Uru in Blue (蒼きウル, Aoki Uru), a sequel to Hiroyuki Yamaga's 1987 Royal Space Force: The Wings of Honnêamise, which was later discontinued.

== Bibliography ==
- Davidson, Gustav (1994). A Dictionary of Angels: Including the Fallen Angels. Free Press. p. 111.
- Horn, Carl Gustav (2015). "Afterword to the english-language edition". Seraphim 266613336Wings. Dark Horse Comics. pp. 236–266. ISBN 9781616556082.
- Kon, Satoshi (2013). Opus 2. Panini Comics. p. 168.
- Mettinger, T. N. D. (1999). "Seraphim". Dictionary of Deities and Demons in the Bible. Brill Publishers. p. 743.
- Miyazaki, Hayao (October 10, 1982). 読者みなさんへ [A tutti i lettori]. Animage (in Japanese) (53). Tokuma Shoten.
- Oshii, Mamoru; Kon, Satoshi (2013). Seraphim 266613336 Wings. Panini Comics.
- Pederzini, Paolo (2013). "Riguardo a Seraphim 266.613.336 Ali". Seraphim 266613336Wings. Panini Comics.
- Ruh, Brian (2004). Stray Dog of Anime: The Films of Mamoru Oshii. Palgrave Macmillan.
- Watanabe, Takashi (2015). "About Seraphim 266613336 Wings". Seraphim 266613336Wings. Dark Horse Comics. ISBN 9781616556082.
