= Masashi Ando =

Japanese animator and character designer

- 安藤 雅司
- Born: January 17, 1969 (age 57); Hiroshima Prefecture, Japan
- Education: Nihon University
- Occupations: Animator; Character designer; filmmaker; screenwriter
- Years active: 1990–present
- Employer: Studio Ghibli (1990–2001)

Masashi Ando (安藤 雅司, Andō Masashi; born January 17, 1969) is a Japanese animator, character designer and filmmaker.

He is known for working with Hayao Miyazaki, Satoshi Kon and Makoto Shinkai. He was the animation director and character designer for three of the four anime films in the top five box office revenues of Japanese films of all time: Princess Mononoke, Spirited Away, and Your Name.

== Career ==
Ando took the entrance exam for Studio Ghibli while he was a student at the Nihon University College of Art and was accepted. At the young age of 25, Ando was chosen to be the chief animation director of Princess Mononoke. Ando also served as Hayao Miyazaki's right-hand man on Spirited Away in 2001, but left Ghibli after a confrontation with Miyazaki over directing methods.

Ando has been involved in Satoshi Kon's films since 2003, and served as character designer and animation director for Kon's 2006 film Paprika. He worked as a character designer and animation director for Hiroyuki Okiura's A Letter to Momo in 2012. He joined Studio Ghibli films for the first time in a long time in 2013 as a member of the animation staff for The Tale of Princess Kaguya. In 2014, he worked on When Marnie Was There as an animation director for Studio Ghibli for the first time in 13 years since Spirited Away, and also co-wrote the script for the film. He led the animation team for the Makoto Shinkai-directed Your Name in 2016.

Ando made his directorial debut with Shika no Ō: Yuna to Yakusoku no Tabi, alongside co-director Masayuki Miyaji. He also served as character designer and animation director.

== Filmography ==
=== Films ===
- Only Yesterday (1991) – in-between animation
- Porco Rosso (1992) – key animation
- Ocean Waves (1993) – assistant animation director (uncredited), key animation
- Pom Poko (1994) – key animation
- Whisper of the Heart (1995) – key animation
- Princess Mononoke (1997) – character design with his mentor Yoshifumi Kondo, chief animation director
- My Neighbors the Yamadas (1999) – key animation
- Spirited Away (2001) – character design, chief animation director
- Tokyo Godfathers (2003) – animation director, key animation
- Ghost in the Shell 2: Innocence (2004) – key animation
- Tekkonkinkreet (2006) – key animation
- Paprika (2006) – character design, animation director and key animation
- Evangelion: 3.0 You Can (Not) Redo (2012) – key animation
- A Letter to Momo (2012) – character design, animation director, key animation
- The Tale of Princess Kaguya (2013) – animation
- When Marnie Was There (2014) – screenplay, character design, animation director
- The Last: Naruto the Movie (2014) – key animation
- Miss Hokusai (2015) – key animation
- Your Name (2016) – character design with Masayoshi Tanaka, animation director
- Napping Princess (2017) – key animation
- Mary and the Witch's Flower (2017) – key animation
- The Deer King (2022) – director with Masayuki Miyaji, storyboard, character design, chief animation director

=== TV series ===
- The Legend of Zorro (1996) – key animation
- Overman King Gainer (2002) – key animation
- Paranoia Agent (2004) – character design, animation director and key animation
- Ghost in the Shell: Stand Alone Complex 2nd GIG (2004) – key animation
- Denno Coil (2007) – key animation
- Bunny Drop (2011) – key animation

=== OVA ===
- The Animatrix (2003) (on the Kid's Story segment) – key animation

=== Music videos ===
- On Your Mark (1995) – character design, animation director

=== Web animation ===
- Japan Animator Expo (2014) – key animation

=== Video games ===
- Magic Pengel: The Quest for Color (2002) – key animation
