= The Holy Warrior =

The Holy Warrior may refer to:

- The Holy Warrior - an episode of Paranoia Agent
- Holy Warrior - a novel by Angus Donald
- Hizbul Mujahideen or "party of holy warriors" - a Kashmiri militant group
