= List of Samurai Champloo episodes =

Box cover art of the Japanese Samurai Champloo Blu-ray complete collection.

Samurai Champloo (Japanese: サムライチャンプルー, Hepburn: Samurai Chanpurū) is a Japanese animated television series which aired 26 episodes between May 2004 and March 2005. Set during Japan's Edo period, the story follows three characters – tea waitress Fuu, vagrant outlaw Mugen, and ronin Jin – as they travel the country in search of a samurai who smells of sunflowers. The series was created and directed by Shinichirō Watanabe and produced by Manglobe. The character designer and animation director was Kazuto Nakazawa, with the series story created by Shinji Obara and Yukihiko Tsutsumi of Office Crescendo. The scripts were written by Obara, Dai Satō, Touko Machida, Keiko Nobumoto, Seiko Takagi, Ryota Sugi, Nakazawa and Watanabe.

The first seventeen episodes of Samurai Champloo premiered on Fuji TV on May 20, 2004, with its broadcast being cancelled on September 9. The series, complete with the remaining episodes referred to as a "second season", was broadcast on BS Fuji from January 22 to March 19, 2005. It saw subsequent international broadcast on Adult Swim (United States), Razer (Canada), SBS TV (Australia), Animax (mainland Asia), and Viceland (United Kingdom).

The series was first released on DVD by Victor Entertainment through its JVC label across thirteen volumes between August 21, 2004, and August 25, 2005. A complete collection was released for DVD and Blu-ray in July 2011. In North America, Geneon Entertainment published the series on seven volumes between January 11 and January 17, 2006. A complete collection was released on July 4. It was later published in the region by Funimation on DVD in 2009 and on Blu-ray in 2019. The series was published by MVM Entertainment the United Kingdom, originally in seven volumes September 5, 2005, and October 16, 2006, then as a complete collection on September 3, 2007. In Australia, a complete for Blu-ray was published by Madman Entertainment on June 15, 2011.

== Episodes ==
No.	Title	Directed by	Written by	Original release date	English air date
1	"Tempestuous Temperaments"; Transliteration: "Storm and Stress / Shippū Dotō" (Japanese: 疾風怒涛)	Shinichirō Watanabe	Shinji Obara	May 20, 2004	May 14, 2005
Fuu, a waitress in a tea house, enrages the son of the town's magistrate when she spills tea on him. The outlaw Mugen enters the tea house and offers to dispatch the magistrate's son and his entourage for Fuu in exchange for food. Meanwhile, the ronin Jin fights and kills the magistrate's bodyguards to stop their execution of an innocent peasant on behalf of the cruel magistrate. Jin then stumbles upon Mugen battling the magistrate's son's entourage, and Mugen challenges him to a fight. Their fight ends up destroying the teahouse, and Fuu decides to quit working as a waitress and search for a samurai who smells of sunflowers, whom she has long sought. Mugen and Jin are captured and sentenced to death, but Fuu saves them by bombing the castle with fireworks. Mugen and Jin attempt to restart their battle, but Fuu persuades them to agree to a coin toss: if it lands on heads then the pair can continue their battle, but if it lands on tails they postpone their battle to help her find the samurai who smells of sunflowers. She wins the toss, and Jin and Mugen agree to postpone their duel before the group are chased from town by the town guards.
2	"Redeye Reprisal"; Transliteration: "Veritable Pandemonium / Hyakkiyakō" (Japanese: 百鬼夜行)	Takeshi Yoshimoto	Shinji Obara	June 3, 2004	May 21, 2005
Desperate for money for food and shelter, the three overhear rumors of an ogre on the loose, whom Mugen offers to kill for a local innkeeper. It is revealed to be a trap set up by Ryujiro, a member of the magistrate's sons entourage who lost an arm battling Mugen in the previous episode. His partner is the "ogre", a man called Oniwakamaru who has seen lifetime abuse for his size and appearance. Ryujiro has Oniwakamaru kill the innkeeper, kidnaps Fuu as a lure, and sets an assassin against Jin. Mugen is seduced and then poisoned by a beautiful woman revealed to be working for Ryujiro. The captive Fuu befriends Oniwakamaru, but he is baited into fighting Mugen. When Ryujiro tries to kill Fuu, Oniwakamaru kills Ryujiro out of gratitude for seeing his humanity and refusing to be afraid of him. Mugen takes the opportunity to strike and kill Oniwakamaru in spite of Fuu's protestation. The assassin, having fought Jin to a standstill, abandons the fight because his client Ryujiro has died.
3	"Hellhounds for Hire (Part 1)"; Transliteration: "Tacit Understanding 1 / Ishindenshin sono ichi" (Japanese: 以心伝心 其之壱)	Shintaro Inokawa	Shinji Obara	June 10, 2004	May 28, 2005
At a fork road, Mugen and Jin abandon Fuu, though the three end up in the same town where two rival yakuza gangs are in conflict. Mugen is hired as a bodyguard by one leader Nagatomi to the annoyance of his current bodyguard Ishimatsu; Jin ends up working as a sword-for-hire by rival gang heir Sousuke; and Fuu falls into a trap and ends up captured and taken to the local brothel where Sousuke's friend Osuzu was forced into to pay her father's debt. Mugen encounters Jin again when he guards Sousuke to break into Nagatomi territory in an attempt to save Osuzu but Fuu interrupts their fight. Jin and Sousuke escape using flash bombs and Nagatomi refuses to pursue them.
4	"Hellhounds for Hire (Part 2)"; Transliteration: "Tacit Understanding 2 / Ishindenshin sono ni" (Japanese: 以心伝心 其之弐)	Hirotaka Endo	Shinji Obara	June 17, 2004	June 4, 2005
The yakuza gangs are brought to the brink of conflict; Mugen urges Nagatomi to fight, then abandons him when Nagatomi reveals his plans for ruling the lands. After leaving Jin, Sousuke accidentally kills a Nagatomi gang member and is captured. Nagatomi confronts Sousuke's father, Heitaro, and the two agree to gamble: Sousuke's life or the town territory. The night of the gamble, Fuu escapes from the brothel but is mistaken as a dice-roller. When Heitaro loses, he commits seppuku. Mugen abruptly interrupts and creates chaos while Nagatomi is killed by the embittered Ishimatsu. Sousuke offers Ishimatsu a place but he declines, later dying in battle against Mugen. The reunited trio leave the town in Sousuke and Osuzu's care.
5	"Artistic Anarchy"; Transliteration: "Utter Indifference / Bajitōfū" (Japanese: 馬耳東風)	Sayo Yamamoto	Dai Satō	June 24, 2004	June 11, 2005
While the trio are at a restaurant, Fuu meets ukiyo-e artist Hishikawa Moronobu. Meanwhile detective Sekami Manzou (Manzou the Saw) is investigating a slave trafficking ring. Fuu poses for Hishikawa for pay, Jin plays games with an old man, and Mugen beats up street thugs. When Hishikawa is finished, Fuu is kidnapped by the local Yakuza; Hishikawa was working for them due to his paintings not selling, but the Yakuza turn on him. Mugen saves Fuu, while Manzou arrests the man Jin was playing with as part of the trafficking ring. Hishiwaka, vowing never to forget Fuu, plans to go to Holland to pursue his artistic dreams; a narration reveals he failed but that his art became influential and famous worldwide.
6	"Stranger Searching"; Transliteration: "Redheaded Foreigner / Akage Ijin" (Japanese: 赤毛異人)	Akira Yoshimura	Shinji Obara	July 1, 2004	June 19, 2005
Short of funds, the three enter an eating contest, with Jin and Mugen giving up their swords as payment, but all lose to Joji, a gay Japanese-speaking European. In exchange for a tour of the city, Joji agrees to return the swords. While on the tour, the group defend Joji from samurai enforcers seeking him as a foreigner. During one point when cornered, Joji reveals himself as Isaac Titsingh of the Dutch East India Company, and the samurai leave them alone. Fuu later asks Joji in private about the samurai who smells of sunflowers, showing him an emblem. A fearful Joji warns her about showing it to anyone, directing her to Nagasaki.
7	"A Risky Racket"; Transliteration: "Surrounded on All Sides / Shimensoka" (Japanese: 四面楚歌)	Takeshi Yoshimoto	Seiko Takagi	July 8, 2004	June 25, 2005
While Fuu, Jin and Mugen are going to get some soup, Fuu's purse is stolen by the thief Shinsuke, who also steals an important item from a local gang. Fuu discovers Shinsuke trying to make a deal using Fuu's money in exchange for medicine for his mother. Fuu later meets Shinsuke's mother, who explains the situation; Shinsuke's father abandoned the family many years ago, leaving her son to care for her alone, eventually turning to crime. The next morning, Fuu confronts Shinsuke but are attacked by the gang and forced to hide. While hiding, Fuu and Shinsuke bond, Fuu revealing her past with a missing father and sick mother. Mugen takes on the gang to rescue Fuu, and Shinsuke escapes but is killed by police.
8	"The Art of Altercation"; Transliteration: "Self-Conceit / Yuigadokuson" (Japanese: 唯我独尊)	Keiichi Sasajima	Dai Satō	July 15, 2004	July 2, 2005
The singing swordsman Nagamitsu and two accompanying thugs hunt for Jin, challenging any glasses-wearing samurai they find. While at a restaurant, Mugen and Jin are infatuated with the curvaceous Budokiba. Budokiba spikes Mugen and Jin's drinks, knocking them out. Meanwhile, Fuu goes out to meet Nagamitsu, and learns he is hunting Jin. She tries to warn them but finds both Mugen and Jin unconscious. The trio manage to earn money by doing tricks, and Jin meets Nagamitsu. One of Nagamitsu's followers, Ogura, challenges him to a duel. Jin is more skilled, but allows Oruga to win, sparing his life. Budokiba's dog interrupts the conflict, revealing Nagamitsu to be her partner. The episode ends with Nagamitsu and Budokiba, their kids and their dog on a boat sailing away while Fuu, Mugen and Jin continue on their journey.
9	"Beatbox Bandits"; Transliteration: "Evil Spirits of Mountain and Stream / Chimimōryō" (Japanese: 魑魅魍魎)	Hirotaka Endo	Dai Satō	July 22, 2004	July 9, 2005
The three purchase travel passes to cross a border, being sentenced to death when the passes are shown to be fake. The border captain offers Mugen a chance to save his friends; get a criminal's head through a bandit-filled forest and return by nightfall. Mugen evades the "bandits", warrior monks wearing Tengu masks, but falls into a trap. One border patrol sends out a man named Yamane to tag Mugen, and frees him. During the chaos, Yamane sets fire to the monk's herb store as a distraction, the fire spreading into their field and releasing hallucinogenic gasses. The fumes reach the border post, saving Fuu and Jin as the guards become docile, and the three reunite when Fuu and Jin come across Mugen partying with the warrior priests.
10	"Lethal Lunacy"; Transliteration: "Fighting Fire with Fire / Idoku Seidoku" (Japanese: 以毒制毒)	Akira Yoshimura	Touko Machida	July 29, 2004	July 16, 2005
The three are offered food by a priest if they clean his dojo. When Fuu is doing errands she hears about the murders of several samurai, with a large bounty offered for the killer's capture. Mugen is the only one interested, and while going to a bar to drink, a man named Shoryu talks to him about the mystery killer. Mugen realizes Shoryu is the killer, and attacks. During the battle, Mugen is briefly overwhelmed by Shoryu's non-contact attacks before the police arrive, with Shoryu promising to fight Mugen on the next full moon. The priest reveals that he was Shoryu's teacher; Shoryu learned the secret techniques surrounding qi after being shipwrecked in China, and his violent ways caused the two to split. Training until the next full moon, Mugen succeeds in killing Shoryu.
11	"Gamblers and Gallantry"; Transliteration: "Fallen Angel / Daraku Tenshi" (Japanese: 堕落天使)	Sayo Yamamoto	Seiko Takagi	August 5, 2004	July 23, 2005
The three are stuck in a town on a rainy night, trying to find work. Mugen trains a rhinoceros beetle for a bug tournament, eventually winning. Jin ends up meeting and bonding with a woman called Shino, who was contemplating drowning herself rather than sell herself into prostitution to pay her husband's debts. While she does become a prostitute the following day, Jin pays to be with her, then helps her escape when he finds out her husband is beating her. Shino buys her freedom from her husband, then Jin fights off the brothel guards while she escapes by boat.
12	"The Disorder Diaries"; Transliteration: "Learning from the Past / Onkochishin" (Japanese: 温故知新)	Hirotaka Endo	Shinichirō Watanabe	August 12, 2004	July 30, 2005
Mugen steals Fuu's diary that she has been keeping since they first started on their journey. The episode is a humorous recap on what has happened so far as seen from Fuu's perspective, which is in turn criticised by Jin and Mugen, in addition to revealing that their initial journey to Edo was in pursuit of a rumor that the sunflower samurai was seen there. In the end, they find a note written by Fuu saying that she knew they would try and snoop into her diary, which enrages Mugen.
13	"Misguided Miscreants (Part 1)"; Transliteration: "Dark Night's Road 1 / An'ya Kōro sono ichi" (Japanese: 暗夜行路 其之壱)	Takeshi Yoshimoto	Shinji Obara	August 26, 2004	November 19, 2005
Fuu, Mugen, and Jin go to the beach for the first time, and the trio meet Mugen's childhood acquaintances Koza and Mukuro. While Mugen is trying to find a boat to Nagasaki, Koza tells them that the three of them grew up on a small section of the Ryukyu Islands together. Unfortunately, it was an island where criminals would be exiled to, forcing the three of them to grow up only knowing a world of crime. It is revealed that Mugen was sentenced to death for a crime he committed, and he jumped in the ocean while Mukuro and Koza watched. Mukuro forces Mugen to join him on a job after winning a bet against Mugen. The job is to steal gold from a government ship, and Mukuro secretly reveals to Koza that he plans to kill Mugen to tie off loose ends. While Mugen is fighting the government officials, Mukuro blows up the ship.
14	"Misguided Miscreants (Part 2)"; Transliteration: "Dark Night's Road 2 / An'ya Kōro sono ni" (Japanese: 暗夜行路 其之弐)	Shūkō Murase	Shinji Obara	September 2, 2004	November 26, 2005
Koza asks Jin to kill Mukuro to avenge Mugen, and Fuu finds Mugen's body near the shore. Meanwhile, Mukuro and his associate Shiren are discussing matters in a hidden area that they plan to use until it is safe to escape, and Mukuro comments on his efforts to hook up Shiren with Koza. While Mukuro introduces Koza to Shiren, Jin appears and kills Mukuro in revenge for Mugen, since he believes himself the only one worthy to kill Mugen. However, Jin realizes that Koza tricked him, and while trying to find her he sees a weakened Mugen. Mugen confronts Shiren and Koza, and effortlessly kills Shiren. Mugen realizes that Koza is deeply lonely, and instead of killing her just ignores her, walking past and leaving her to her life without anyone who cares about her or even the gold that the gang stole.
15	"Bogus Booty"; Transliteration: "Through and Through / Tettō Tetsubi" (Japanese: 徹頭徹尾)	Kazuto Nakazawa	Uwadan Shimofuwato (Note: Pen name for Kazuto Nakazawa.)	September 9, 2004	December 3, 2005
While fishing, the three discover a large bag of money, which they used to get a good meal in the next town and that Mugen and Jin intend to use in the town's red light district. Jin spends his money there and winds up with a sore back. Unfortunately, the money is forged and not intended for the public, with a local gang led by a man called Ginsa believing a shogunate spy Yatsuha Imano is responsible, having caught and tortured her partner. Imano uses Mugen for her own ends, promising to sleep with him if he helps destroy Ginsa's gang. He succeeds, but when he finally accepts to have sex, she knocks him out and leaves him under a tree outside town. As she departs with her partner, she promises to marry Mugen when their journeys are complete.
16	"Lullabies of the Lost (Verse 1)"; Transliteration: "Idling One's Life Away, first verse / Suiseimushi hito yume" (Japanese: 酔生夢死 ひと夢)	Masato Miyoshi	Keiko Nobumoto	September 16, 2004	December 10, 2005
As Fuu, Mugen, and Jin continue to wander the woods, they get into a massive fight regarding their mission of finding the sunflower samurai. Impatient and irritated, Mugen angrily presses Fuu for information about their journey, but Fuu remains stubborn about revealing all the details. After things get too heated, the three split up and go their separate ways. Fuu is briefly abandoned by her pet Momo, and falls into a river. Mugen is misidentified as a Matsumae Clan soldier and attacked by a man, Okuru, barely escaping. Jin is attacked by his former classmate Yukimaru and jumps off a cliff, and Okuru rescues Fuu from the river. While hiding, Mugen is ambushed by the Matsumae Clan, who mistakes him for Okuru.
17	"Lullabies of the Lost (Verse 2)"; Transliteration: "Idling One's Life Away, second verse / Suiseimushi futa yume" (Japanese: 酔生夢死 ふた夢)	Hirotaka Endo	Ryota Sugi	September 23, 2004	December 17, 2005
Mugen manages to hold off the Matsumae Clan and then captures a clan member who reveals that Okuru murdered an entire village, members of the Matsumae clan, and even his own wife and daughter. Fuu asks Okuru to travel with her to find the sunflower samurai, but Okuru declines. Jin is recovering from his fight with Yukimaru, and overhears the Matsumae Clan talking about Mugen and Okuru. Mugen meets Okuru again, and Okuru explains that the Matsumae Clan spread the disease into his village before setting it on fire to prevent it from spreading. Jin overhears Fuu's screams and finds out Yukimaru used her as bait to draw Jin out. Jin and Yukimaru fight, with Jin killing Yukimaru. They overhear explosions as the Matsumae Clan interrupt Mugen and Okuru's fight. The Matsumae shoot Okuru with flaming arrows, and Mugen attacks them for interrupting their fight. The next day, the trio continue their journey, Fuu revealing that she is seeking revenge against the sunflower samurai for the sake of her mother.
18	"War of the Words"; Transliteration: "Pen in One Hand, Sword in the Other / Bunburyōdō" (Japanese: 文武両道)	Sayo Yamamoto	Dai Satō	January 22, 2005	January 12, 2006
While ordering food, Fuu realizes that Mugen is illiterate. A man named Bundai decides to teach Mugen how to read, using excessive force during their training. While walking in the village, Fuu and Jin see the houses are covered in graffiti by two descendants of Jin's old master: Tatsunoshin and Kazunosuke. Jin reveals that when he was a student under Niwa, he made a promise upon request from his master. Jin agreed that if some terrible fate were to ever befall his master, he would take care of his two sons. Mugen finally learns how to read, and the trio learn that the brothers will hold a graffiti contest on Hiroshima Castle, the winner getting Fuu and becoming the dojo leader. However, Mugen wins the contest instead, and another artist, Ando Uohori, is impressed with the brothers and offers them the chance to be fashion icons. However, Bundai takes the brothers away.
19	"Unholy Union"; Transliteration: "Karma and Retribution / Ingaōhō" (Japanese: 因果応報)	Hirotaka Endo	Seiko Takagi	January 29, 2005	January 19, 2006
Fuu is waiting for Jin and Mugen in a shed when a young woman name Yuri barges in, trying to hide from a charlatan named Xavier III who pretends to be Christian so he can get weapons. Yuri notices the necklace Fuu wears, and confirms it to be a Christian symbol. Xavier's thugs break in the shed, knocking out Fuu and kidnapping Yuri. While the trio try to find Yuri, Fuu is caught, and Yuri reveals that the sunflower samurai's name is Seizo Kasumi. Mugen and Jin expose Xavier III as a fraud, and while trying to escape Xavier III accidentally kills himself. The next morning, the trio say farewell to Yuri; Fuu then reveals that the sunflower samurai is her father. They begin travelling to Ikitsuki to find him.
20	"Elegy of Entrapment (Verse 1)"; Transliteration: "Generous Elegy 1 / Hikakōgai sono ichi" (Japanese: 悲歌慷慨 其之壱)	Takeshi Yoshimoto	Shinji Obara	February 5, 2005	January 26, 2006
Fuu, Mugen and Jin meet a blind woman, a travelling musician named Sara. Because of her blindness, she is able to sense the emotions of the group. During their travels, the trio grow close to Sara, especially Mugen. One night, Sara asks Fuu if it is okay for either Jin or Mugen to accompany her during her destination, and Fuu chooses Jin, thinking Jin would refuse. However, much to her horror, Jin accepts and leaves with Sara. That night however, Jin is attacked by Sara on top of an old bridge.
21	"Elegy of Entrapment (Verse 2)"; Transliteration: "Generous Elegy 2 / Hikakōgai sono ni" (Japanese: 悲歌慷慨 其之弐)	Akitoshi Yokoyama	Shinji Obara	February 12, 2005	February 2, 2006
Sara overpowers Jin, but Jin cuts the bridge ropes, sending them into the river. The next day Fuu and Mugen find Sara, and Sara lies that she could not find Jin. While investigating, Mugen finds Sara's damaged instrument and cane, and realizes Sara is lying. He confronts her, but Sara attacks and is stopped when Fuu shields him and she leaves, conflicted in her feelings. Jin recovers, having been saved by a fisherman, and Sara is told by her employer to stop the three or her son will die. The three reunite, then Mugen has a final fight with Sara which she deliberately loses. Mugen asks her why she held back before she dies, and Sara reveals that she has nothing to live for now that her son was already dead.
22	"Cosmic Collisions"; Transliteration: "Anger Shot Toward Heaven / Dohatsu Shōten" (Japanese: 怒髪衝天)	Sayo Yamamoto	Dai Satō	February 19, 2005	February 9, 2006
Travelling in the mountains, Jin and Mugen gorge on wild mushrooms despite Fuu's protests, and they end up going through a series of strange events; they are conscripted into digging a meteorite crater with a group of revived corpses by a man called Shige, who believes the treasure at its base will secure his rule over the Genji clan, though Fuu realises Shige is also undead and does not know five hundred years have passed since he found the crater. Jin studies Shige's genealogy and disproves his claim to the Genji line, causing the undead to turn on him. Another meteorite falls sending up a mushroom-shaped cloud of debris, ending the episode.
23	"Baseball Blues"; Transliteration: "Heart and Soul Into the Ball / Ikkyū Nyūkon" (Japanese: 一球入魂)	Mitsutaka Noshitani	Shinichirō Watanabe	February 26, 2005	February 16, 2006
Fuu, Mugen and Jin try to go to Ikitsuki where the sunflower samurai resides. An American ship crewed by baseball players arrives. The Americans want to do business with the Japanese by force, using intimidation tactics on the locals. A man named Kagemaru makes Fuu, Mugen, and Jin play baseball with an old man, Sakami Manzou, and a dog. During the game, Kagemaru is killed, but Mugen successfully defeats the baseball team, winning the match.
24	"Evanescent Encounter (Part 1)"; Transliteration: "Circle of Transmigration 1 / Shōji Ruten sono ichi" (Japanese: 生死流転 其之壱)	Takeshi Yoshimoto	Shinichirō Watanabe, Shinji Obara	March 5, 2005	February 23, 2006
Kariya Kagetoki, a powerful samurai, is recruited by the shogunate to kill Mugen, Jin and Fuu before they reach Fuu's father Seizo Kasumi, the sunflower samurai. Meanwhile three assassins named Denkibou, Umanosuke, and Toube are also tracking the three, killing anyone who gets in their way. Mugen, Jin and Fuu finally arrive in Nagasaki, their final stop before Ikitsuki, but Fuu is feeling sad about their journey ending. She tries to find souvenirs for them, leaving a thank you note and leaving alone to confront her father. Kagetoki meets Mugen and Jin, and states that Fuu's father was one of the leaders of the Shimabara Rebellion, and that the shogunate was tracking the heroes to find Fuu's father. Kagetoki challenges them to fight, and Fuu is attacked by the assassins.
25	"Evanescent Encounter (Part 2)"; Transliteration: "Circle of Transmigration 2 / Shōji Ruten sono ni" (Japanese: 生死流転 其之弐)	Kazuto Nakazawa	Shinichirō Watanabe, Shinji Obara	March 12, 2005	March 2, 2006
Mugen and Kagetoki fight, with Mugen being easily defeated, and Denkibou arriving to tell Mugen and Jin to go to the church on Ikitsui to save Fuu. Jin tells Mugen to go, and Kariya Kagetoki expresses interest in killing the samurai who killed Enshiro Mariya, Jin's teacher. It is revealed that Jin killed his master after Kagetoki persuaded Mariya to turn his students into assassins and later ordered Mariya to kill Jin. Kagetoki and Jin fight again, with Kagetoki seemingly killing Jin. Meanwhile, Denkibou attacks Mugen on the boat to Ikitsui, and Mugen kills him while being gravely injured. Mugen finds Umanosuke holding Fuu captive, and Umanosuke reveals he, Denkibou, and Toube were government officials that were on the ship Mugen and Mukuro blew up in "Misguided Miscreants". Umanosuke agrees to free Fuu if Mugen gives up his sword, and Mugen agrees. Umanosuke lets Fuu go, and attacks Mugen viciously while Fuu reaches her father.
26	"Evanescent Encounter (Part 3)"; Transliteration: "Circle of Transmigration 3 / Shōji Ruten sono san" (Japanese: 生死流転 其之参)	Sayo Yamamoto, Shinichirō Watanabe	Shinichirō Watanabe	March 19, 2005	March 9, 2006
Fuu confronts her father Kasumi, who is dying of illness; she is angry that he abandoned her mother to a life of hardship and loneliness, but does not fulfil her revenge as he is already dying. Kagetoki arrives and kills Kasumi, then a wounded Jin arrives and kills Kagetoki with a secret move. Mugen escapes Umanosuke's torture and kills him, then narrowly escapes when Toube attempts to kill him in a suicide bomb attack. Since Mugen and Jin successfully led Fuu to her father, the two agree to fight each other despite Fuu's protest. Their blades shatter on impact, and the two agree to postpone their duel as they consider each other friends. While Mugen and Jin recover, Fuu learns that her father abandoned Fuu and her mother to prevent the Shogunate from targeting them. The three decide to split but not before Fuu reveals that she lied about the outcome of the coin flip in the beginning of the journey. Mugen and Jin get annoyed, but the three part on good terms, grateful for their shared memories.
