= Metacomic =

Genre of comics about comics

Metacomic is a metafictional comics style in which the characters realize that they are living in a comic. In a metacomic, the characters are able to take advantage of the comic's structure to progress in the storyline. In brief, a metacomic is a comic about a comic.

== Elements ==
- Using the comic structure as an advantage (making the characters travel across comic panels, interact with speech balloons and other panels, or using the characters' speech as a "real", solid object).
- Drawing the author themselves into the comic to act as a character and interact with other characters.
- Using direct help from the author (the author's "hand" might appear to the comic and draw a helpful object, delete enemies with an eraser, or touch/move the characters).

== Examples ==
- Krazy Kat by George Herriman
- L'Origine by Marc-Antoine Mathieu
- Understanding Comics by Scott McCloud
- Fight Club 2 by Chuck Palahniuk
- Opus by Satoshi Kon
- Deadpool in Marvel Comics
- The author of and characters from the webcomic Sinfest
- The creators of the graphic novel Logicomix
- Imbattable by Pascal Jousselin
- Gwenpool in Marvel Comics
