= Ikari =

Ikari may refer to:

== People with the surname ==
- Yuki Ikari (井狩 裕貴; born 2000), Japanese swimmer

== Entertainment ==
=== Anime ===
- Neon Genesis Evangelion characters:
  - Gendo Ikari
  - Shinji Ikari
  - Yui Ikari
- Paranoia Agent characters:
  - Keiichi Ikari
  - Misae Ikari

=== Other media ===
- Rage (2016 film), also known as Ikari
- Ikari Warriors, a video game also known as Ikari
