= Satoshi Kon =

Japanese anime director and manga artist (1963–2010)

- 今 敏
- Born: October 12, 1963; Sapporo, Hokkaido, Japan
- Died: August 24, 2010 (aged 46); Tokyo, Japan
- Other name: Yoshihiro Wanibuchi (鰐淵 良宏)
- Education: Musashino Art University
- Occupations: Animator; film director; screenwriter; manga artist
- Years active: 1984–2010
- Spouse: Kyoko Kon (m. 1995)
- Relatives: Tsuyoshi Kon (brother)
- Website: konstone.s-kon.net

Satoshi Kon (今 敏, Kon Satoshi; October 12, 1963 – August 24, 2010) was a Japanese film director, animator, screenwriter and manga artist from Sapporo, Hokkaido, and a member of the Japanese Animation Creators Association (JAniCA). He was a graduate of the Graphic Design department of the Musashino Art University. He is best known for his acclaimed anime films Perfect Blue (1997), Millennium Actress (2001), Tokyo Godfathers (2003), and Paprika (2006), and the TV series Paranoia Agent (2004). In 2010, Kon died of pancreatic cancer at age 46.

== Biography ==
=== Early life ===
Satoshi Kon was born on October 12, 1963. Due to his father's job transfer, Kon's education from the fourth elementary grade up to the second middle-school grade was based in Sapporo. Kon was a classmate and close friend of manga artist Seihō Takizawa. While attending Hokkaido Kushiro Koryo High School, Kon aspired to become an animator. Kon entered the Graphic Design course of the Musashino Art University in 1982.

=== Early career ===
While in college, Kon made his debut as a manga artist with the short manga Toriko (1984) and earned a runner-up spot in the 10th Annual Tetsuya Chiba Awards held by Young Magazine (Kodansha). Afterward, he found work as Katsuhiro Otomo's assistant. After graduating from college in 1987, Kon authored the single-volume manga Kaikisen (1990) and wrote the script for Otomo's live-action film World Apartment Horror.

In 1991, Kon worked in anime for the first time as an animator and on background design for the film Roujin Z, which was written by Otomo.

He began working around 1992 as a scriptwriter, layout artist, and background designer for Magnetic Rose (directed by Koji Morimoto), one of three short films in Katsuhiro Otomo's omnibus Memories (released in 1995). This was the first time he adopted "the fusion of fantasy and reality" as the theme of his work.

Kon worked as one of five layout artists on Mamoru Oshii's Patlabor 2: The Movie in 1993, along with other animated films. He worked as a key animator on episode 2 of the 1993–1994 OVA JoJo's Bizarre Adventure, and he worked as the writer and storyboard artist for episode 5.

Kon then worked with Mamoru Oshii on the manga Seraphim: Wings of 266,613,336, which was written by Oshii and drawn by Kon. The manga was serialized in the monthly anime magazine Animage starting in 1994. However, as the series progressed, the opinions of Kon and Oshii became divided, and the series went on hiatus and ended unfinished. After this work, Kon ended his career as a manga artist and devoted himself to making anime.

=== Directing ===
In 1997, Kon began work on his directorial debut Perfect Blue (based on Yoshikazu Takeuchi's novel of the same name). It was the first film by Kon to be produced by Madhouse, and producer Masao Maruyama invited him because he was impressed by Kon's work on JoJo's Bizarre Adventure. A suspense story centered on a pop idol, Kon was initially unsatisfied with the first script based on the original and requested to make changes to it. With the permission of the original author, Yoshikazu Takeuchi, Kon was allowed to make any changes he wanted, except for keeping the three elements of the novel ("idol," "horror" and "stalker"). The screenplay was written by Sadayuki Murai, who worked in the idea of a blurred border between the real world and imagination.

Following Perfect Blue, Kon considered adapting the 1993 Yasutaka Tsutsui novel Paprika into his next film. However, these plans were stalled when the distribution company for Perfect Blue (Rex Entertainment) went bankrupt. Coincidentally, Kon's next work would also feature a film studio going bankrupt.

In 2002, Kon's second film, Millennium Actress, was released to the public. The distribution company for the North American release was DreamWorks-affiliated Go Fish Pictures. The film centers on a retired actress who mysteriously withdraws from the public eye at the peak of her career. Having the same estimated budget as Perfect Blue (approximately 120 million yen), Millennium Actress garnered higher critical and financial success than its predecessor and earned numerous awards. The screenplay was written by Sadayuki Murai, who utilized a seamless connection between illusion and reality to create a "Trompe-l'œil kind of film". Millennium Actress was the first Satoshi Kon film to feature Susumu Hirasawa, of whom Kon was a long-time fan, as composer.

In 2003, Kon's third work, Tokyo Godfathers, was announced. The distribution company for the North American release was Sony Pictures-affiliated Destination Films. The film centers on a trio of homeless people in Tokyo who discover a baby on Christmas Eve and set out to search for her parents. Tokyo Godfathers cost more to make than Kon's previous two films (with a budget of approximately 300 million yen), and centered on the themes of homelessness and abandonment, with a comedic touch worked in. The screenplay was written by Keiko Nobumoto. This work also marked the transition from celluloid animation to digital animation.

In 2004, Kon released the 13-episode television series Paranoia Agent, in which Kon revisits the theme of the blending of imagination and reality, as well as working in additional social themes. The series was created from an abundance of unused ideas for stories and arrangements that Kon felt were good but did not fit into any of his projects.

In 2006, Paprika was announced, after having been planned out and materializing for several years. The story centers on a new form of psychotherapy that utilizes dream analysis to treat mental patients. The film was highly successful and earned a number of film awards. Kon summed up the film with "Kihonteki na story igai wa subete kaeta" (基本的なストーリー以外は全て変えた)—roughly, "Everything but the fundamental story was changed." Much like Kon's previous works, the film focuses on the synergy of dreams and reality.

He participated in the TV program Ani*Kuri15 broadcast by NHK in 2007. His one-minute short film Ohayō was aired along with works by Mamoru Oshii, Makoto Shinkai, and others. That same year, Kon helped establish and served as a member of the Japanese Animation Creators Association (JAniCA).

=== Health deterioration and death ===
Following Ohayō, Kon began work on his next film, Dreaming Machine. In May 2010, Kon was diagnosed with terminal pancreatic cancer. Given half a year to live, Kon chose to spend the remainder of his life in his home. Shortly before his death, Kon composed a final message, which was uploaded to his blog by his family upon his death. As Kon explained in the message, he chose not to make news of his rapidly advancing illness public, in part out of embarrassment at how drastically emaciated and ravaged his body had become. The result was that the announcement of his death was met with widespread shock and surprise, particularly given that Kon had shown no signs of illness at relatively recent public events, as the cancer progressed to a terminal state in a matter of months after being diagnosed. Kon died on August 24, 2010, at the age of 46. After his death, Kon was mentioned among the Fond Farewells in Time's people of the year 2010. Darren Aronofsky wrote a eulogy to him, which was printed in Satoshi Kon's Animation Works (今敏アニメ全仕事), a Japanese retrospective book of his animation career.

=== Dreaming Machine ===
In November 2010, Madhouse, the animation studio that had previously produced Kon's works, officially announced that they would continue to produce the unfinished "Yumemiru Kikai", and that the animation director Yoshimi Itazu would be acting as the director. According to Takeshi Honda, animator and frequent collaborator with Satoshi Kon, Kon disappeared in the middle of production on the movie. He had not informed most of the staff on the movie about his pancreatic cancer, including producer Masao Maruyama. Maruyama recorded the script to the movie on Kon's deathbed and promised to see the project to completion. However, the project was halted in 2011 due to financial reasons. By 2013, the completion of Dreaming Machine still remained uncertain due to funding difficulties, with only 600 of the 1,500 shots being animated.

At Otakon 2012, Madhouse founder Masao Maruyama, who was involved in all of Kon's films from Perfect Blue to Paprika and was also his friend and collaborator, stated: "Unfortunately, we still don't have enough money. My personal goal is to get it within five years after his passing. I'm still working hard towards that goal."

In July 2015, Maruyama reported that Dreaming Machine remains in production, but they are looking for a director to match Kon's abilities and similar vision.

In August 2016, Mappa Producer Masao Maruyama said in an interview: "For 4–5 years, I kept searching for a suitable director to complete Kon's work. Before his death, the storyboard and script, even part of the keyframe film was already completed. Then I thought, even if someone can mimic Kon's work, it would still be clear that it's only an imitation. For example, if Mamoru Hosoda took the director's position, the completed Dreaming Machine would still be a good piece of work. However, that would make it Hosoda's movie, not Kon's. Dreaming Machine should be Kon's movie, him and only him, not someone else's. That means we cannot and should not "compromise" only to finish it. I spent years to finally reach this hard conclusion. Instead, we should take only Kon's "original concept", and let somebody turn it into a feature film. By doing so, the completed piece could 100% be that person's work, and I'm OK with that. I also considered about doing a documentary of Kon."

However, Maruyama has not completely given up on the production. He says, "If a talented director from overseas is willing to take on the project, it is not entirely without possibility," suggesting that the project is not entirely without a chance of restarting.

== Themes ==
The theme of "mixture of fiction and reality" was a keyword that symbolized Satoshi Kon's works, and he repeatedly depicted the relationship between "fiction and reality" with various approaches in each of his works. In Perfect Blue, Millennium Actress, Paranoia Agent, and Paprika, the boundary between fiction and reality gradually became blurred, and the characters were portrayed as going back and forth between fiction and reality. At first glance, Tokyo Godfathers did not seem to deal with the motif of "fiction and reality," but it had a device in which the "fiction" of "miracles and coincidences" is successively introduced into the realistic life of homeless people in Tokyo. Because of the character designs and the way they are expressed, Kon's works seemed to be aiming for realism. However, Kon's goal was not to "depict landscapes and people that look as if they are real" but to "depict the moment when landscapes and people that look as if they are real suddenly reveal themselves to be 'fiction' or 'pictures'". His ability to depict a realistic world, which he demonstrated in order in the films he has participated in as a staff member, such as Otomo's and Oshii's works, was utilized in his own works to most effectively show the drop of "transition from reality to fiction". The world that appeared to be real in Kon's works did not remain real, but is suddenly transformed into an unfamiliar world in order to disorient the audience. This is the reason why he insisted on animated films instead of live action.

When asked about his interest in female characters, Kon stated that female characters were easier to write because he was not able to know the character in the same way as a male character, and he "can project my obsession onto the characters and expand the aspects I want to describe." With a frame of reference up to Tokyo Godfathers, Susan J. Napier noted that while the theme of performance is the one obvious commonality in his works, she found that the concept of the male gaze was the more important topic for discussion. Napier showed the evolution of Kon's use of the gaze from its restrictive and negative aspects in Magnetic Rose and Perfect Blue, to a collaborative gaze in Millennium Actress before arriving at a new type of gaze in Tokyo Godfathers which reveled in uncertainty and illusion.

Dean DeBlois said, "Satoshi Kon used the hand-drawn medium to explore social stigmas and the human psyche, casting a light on our complexities in ways that might have failed in live action. Much of it was gritty, intense and, at times, even nightmarish. Kon didn't shy away from mature subject matter or live-action sensibilities in his work, and his films will always occupy a fascinating middle ground between 'cartoons' and the world as we know it."

== Influences ==
Kon stated in 2007 that the music of Susumu Hirasawa had been the greatest influence on his expressive style. Kon said that he has learned a lot from Hirasawa's attitude towards music and production, and that he owes a lot of the stories and concepts he creates to his influence. Kon's idea of fractal control of film comes from Susumu Hirasawa, who has applied fractal-generating programs to music production. Hirasawa's lyrics sparked Kon's interest in Jungian psychology and the writings of Hayao Kawai, Japan's foremost expert on Jungian psychology, who has psychologically deciphered ancient myths and folktales, which greatly influenced his storytelling and direction. All of Kon's works, from Perfect Blue to the suspended Dreaming Machine, have been inspired by Hirasawa's lyrics and songs. (Note: Attributed to multiple sources:) Susumu Hirasawa's "Rotation (LOTUS-2)", which is the theme song of Millennium Actress, was played at Kon's funeral.

Kon says that he is influenced by everything he has been exposed to in his life, including writing, painting, music, film, manga, anime, television and theater. He has learned a lot from Osamu Tezuka and Katsuhiro Otomo in manga, Hayao Miyazaki in animation, Akira Kurosawa and many other great Japanese and international directors in film.

He was familiarized with Tezuka's manga and animation works such as Astro Boy, The Jungle Emperor and Princess Knight in his childhood.

He was an avid watcher of anime titles, such as Space Battleship Yamato (1974), Heidi, Girl of the Alps (1974), Future Boy Conan (1978), Galaxy Express 999 (1978) and Mobile Suit Gundam (1979) during his junior and senior high school years, which Japanese anime fans of the time were crazy about.

Otomo had a strong influence on him, and his favorite works were Domu: A Child's Dream and AKIRA, especially Domu, which he liked so much that he said if he could make a movie out of only one manga he had ever read, it would be that one. He was also influenced by the New Wave movement in manga started by Otomo and others, and decided to not only read but also draw manga himself in his high school days. He was enlightened by the New Wave's way of overwhelmingly depicting a story in which nothing in particular happens, focusing on a character who could never be the protagonist of the story. Kon has also said that his drawing style has been influenced by Otomo, as he used to work as Otomo's assistant when he was a manga artist. After entering the animation industry, he was greatly influenced by animators Hiroyuki Okiura, Toshiyuki Inoue, Takeshi Honda, Masashi Ando and art setter Takashi Watabe.

He had been watching only live-action films since he started college. He watched most of the movies on video and made it a routine to draw manga based on the setting, format and direction of the scenes. Ninety percent of the films he watched were made in the U.S., and he said that he learned a lot about his own style of visual expression from Hollywood films. However, he was not influenced by any particular film or director, but by everything he had ever seen. For example, Millennium Actress has scenes that borrow images from Kurosawa's Throne of Blood, Yasujiro Ozu's films, the hero of the chambara film Kurama Tengu, or the great Japanese star Godzilla. The film that directly influenced Millennium Actress is George Roy Hill's Slaughterhouse-Five (1972). When he was in college, it was not one film that influenced him the most, but the entire body of work of Terry Gilliam, including Time Bandits (1981), Brazil (1985) and The Adventures of Baron Munchausen (1989). However, the filmmaker whose works and books he had read the most is Akira Kurosawa.

As for novels, the works of Ryotaro Shiba, the Japanese historical novelist, had a great impact on Kon in terms of his own relationship with Japan. He was also very much inspired by Haruki Murakami, whose works have been translated into many foreign languages. He had seen the film Blade Runner (1982) before reading the novel and had not read all of his works, but Philip K. Dick was one of the authors he wanted to read and he became very interested in images of nightmares under his influence. He has been a long-time fan of Yasutaka Tsutsui since before he directed Paprika, and was especially influenced by reading Tsutsui's works intensively when he was around 20 years old. It was such a fundamental influence that even he did not know how or where Tsutsui's work influenced him. According to Kon, the appeal of Yasutaka Tsutsui's work is "deviation from common sense." What he learned from Tsutsui was "doubt the framework of common sense."

== Legacy ==
Kon has had a great influence on directors around the world even after his death, and artists and works have been influenced by his realistic visual expression and vivid editing. Kon's influence on foreign filmmakers was more pronounced than in Japan, with directors such as Darren Aronofsky and Guillermo del Toro expressing their support.

American filmmaker Aronofsky is one of the directors greatly influenced by Kon, especially Perfect Blue. In an interview with Kon in 2001, he said that any scene in Requiem for a Dream that seems to be influenced by Perfect Blue is a homage to it, and that he still wants to make a live-action version of Perfect Blue. His 2010 film Black Swan was also pointed out by several critics for its similarity to Perfect Blue, but Aronofsky denied any direct influence.

Christopher Nolan's 2010 film Inception was also noted by several critics and scholars to have many similarities with Kon's Paprika (2006), including plot similarities, and similar scenes and characters. (Note: Attributed to multiple references:)

== Filmography ==
=== Film ===
Year	Title	Director	Writer	Animator	Notes
1991	World Apartment Horror	No	Story	No	Adapted to his own manga of the same name.
1991	Roujin Z	No	No	Yes	Background designer and key animator
1992	Hashire Melos!	No	No	Yes	Layouts and key animator
1993	Patlabor 2	No	No	No	Layouts
1995	Memories	No	Yes	No	Segment: Magnetic Rose; Also background designer and layouts
1997	Perfect Blue	Yes	No	No	Also character designer
2001	Millennium Actress	Yes	Yes	No	Also character designer
2003	Tokyo Godfathers	Yes	Yes	No	Also character designer
2006	Paprika	Yes	Yes	No	

=== Television ===
Year	Title	Director	Writer	Animator	Notes
1993	JoJo's Bizarre Adventure	Yes	Yes	Yes	3 episodes; also storyboard artist Key animator of episode: "Iggy the Fool and N'Doul 'The GEB' (Part II)"
2004	Paranoia Agent	Yes	Yes	No	13 episodes; also creator and storyboard artist for 4 episodes
2008	Good Morning	Yes	Yes	No	1-minute short film aired on television.

== Bibliography ==
=== Manga ===
Year	Title	Notes
1984	Toriko (虜)	Manga debut and a doujinshi work. It won the 2nd place Tetsuya Chiba Award for "Superior Newcomer". Published in English in the collection Dream Fossil. It is not related to the Mitsutoshi Shimabukuro manga Toriko.
1990	Tropic of the Sea (海帰線)	Published in Young Magazine by Kodansha. Published in English in 2013 by Vertical Comics.
1990	Akira	Uncredited assistant artist
1991	World Apartment Horror (ワールド・アパートメントホラー)	Adapted from the film of the same name directed by Katsuhiro Otomo from a Keiko Nobumoto screenplay. After the main feature the volume collects three much shorter manga original to Kon: Visitors, Waira and Joyful Bell, which last prefigures Tokyo Godfathers.
1994	Seraphim 266613336Wings (セラフィム 2億6661万3336の翼)	An unfinished collaboration with Mamoru Oshii that first ran in the May 1994 issue to the November 1995 issue of Animage. Partially reprinted posthumously in a memorial supplement of Monthly Comic Ryū in 2010 and published in comic book form by Tokuma Shoten in December that same year. Published in English in 2015 by Dark Horse Comics.
1995–1996	Opus	An incomplete manga that was released bi-monthly in Comic Guys from 1995 to 1996. It was collected and re-released in December 2010. Published in English in 2014 by Dark Horse Comics.

=== Other literary works ===
Year	Title	Publisher	ISBN	Notes
2002	Kon's Tone: The Road to "Millennium Actress" (コンズ・トーン: 「千年女優」への道)	Shobunsha Publications	978-4794965462	Biography-type work documenting his journey to his second film. Reissued in 2013.
2002	Chiyoko: Millennial Actress (千年女優画報―『千年女優』ビジュアルブック)	Kawade Shobo Shinsha	978-4309905112	Artbook containing interviews with the cast and director as well as character design art by Madhouse animation.
2003	Tokyo Godfathers: Angel Book (東京ゴッドファーザーズ・エンジェルブック)	Takarajimasha	978-4796636803	Artbook containing interviews with the cast and director as well as character and background art.
2011	The Anime Works of Satoshi Kon (今 敏アニメ全仕事)	G.B. Co. Ltd.	978-4901841948	Retrospective book containing interviews, character design sheets and more.
2012	Kon's Tone II			Sold exclusively through Kon's Tone online store. Collection of essays and sketches, including his farewell message.
2015	Perfect Blue Storyboard Collection (今敏 絵コンテ集 PERFECT BLUE)	Fukkan	978-4835451411	Complete storyboards for Perfect Blue, smaller print originally bundled with Limited Edition of the 2008 release of Perfect Blue on home video.
2015	Dream Fossil: The Complete Stories of Satoshi Kon	Vertical Comics	978-1941220245	Originally published in Japan in 2011. A collection of his short manga stories published between 1984 and 1989. Includes Toriko, Waira and Joyful Bell.
2015	The Art of Satoshi Kon	Dark Horse Comics	978-1616557416	Released in Japan as Kon's Work 1982–2010 in 2014. Artbook spanning entire career, contains character design for unreleased film Dreaming Machine.

== Accolades ==
Year	Award	Category	Nominated work	Result
1984	Tetsuya Chiba Awards	Superior Newcomer	Toriko (虜)	2nd place
1997	Fantasia Film Festival	Best Asian Film	Perfect Blue	Won
1998	Fantasporto	Best Film – Animation	Perfect Blue	Won
1998	Fantasporto	International Fantasy Film Award	Perfect Blue	Nominated
2000	Fangoria Chainsaw Awards	Chainsaw Award	Perfect Blue	Nominated
2000	B-Movie Film Festival	B-Movie Award	Perfect Blue	Won
2001	Japan Agency of Cultural Affairs Media Arts Festival	Grand Prize	Millennium Actress	Won
2001	Fantasia Film Festival	Best Animation Film	Millennium Actress	Won
2001	Fantasia Film Festival	Fantasia Ground-Breaker	Millennium Actress	Won
2001	Festival de Cine de Sitges	Orient Express Award	Millennium Actress	Won
2002	Mainichi Film Awards	Ofuji Noburo Award	Millennium Actress	Won
2003	Animation Kobe	Theatrical Film Award	Millennium Actress	Won
2003	Japan Media Arts Festival	Excellence Award	Tokyo Godfathers	Won
2003	Mainichi Film Awards	Best Animation Film	Tokyo Godfathers	Won
2004	Annie Awards	Best Animated Feature	Millennium Actress	Nominated
2004	Annie Awards	Outstanding Directing in an Animated Feature Production	Millennium Actress	Nominated
2004	Annie Awards	Writing in an Animated Feature Production	Millennium Actress	Nominated
2004	Tokyo Anime Award	Domestic Feature Film	Tokyo Godfathers	Won
2006	Montréal Festival of New Cinema	Public's Choice Award	Paprika	Won
2006	63rd Venice International Film Festival	Golden Lion (Best Film)	Paprika	Nominated
2007	Fantasporto	Critics Choice Award (Prémio da Crítica)	Paprika	Won
2007	Newport Beach Film Festival	Feature Film Award for Best Animation	Paprika	Won
2007	Online Film Critics Society Awards	Best Animated Film	Paprika	Nominated
2007	Animation Kobe	Best Feature Length Theatrical Anime	Paprika	Won
2019	Annie Awards	Winsor McCay Award	N/A	Won
