= Megahertz (disambiguation) =

Megahertz may refer to:

- 1,000,000 Hertz (the SI unit of frequency)
- Megahertz (horse), a Thoroughbred racehorse
- Megahertz (record producer), American record producer, composer and songwriter
- Megahertz Stakes, American Thoroughbred horse race, named after the horse
- Megaherz, a German band
