= List of Paranoia Agent episodes =

Paranoia Agent is a 2004 Japanese anime television series created by director Satoshi Kon and produced by Madhouse about a social phenomenon in Musashino, Tokyo caused by a juvenile serial assailant named Shonen Bat (Lil' Slugger in the English dub). The series aired on Japan's Wowow from February to May 2004. The English dub aired on Cartoon Network's Adult Swim in the United States from May to August 2005.

== Episode list ==
All episodes were written by Seishi Minakami, except episodes 5 and 10, which were handled by Tomomi Yoshino.

No.	Title (Note: All English titles are taken from Geneon.)	Storyboard	Directed by	Animation supervisor	Background art director	Original release date	English air date
1	"Enter Lil' Slugger"; Transliteration: "Shōnen Batto sanjō" (Japanese: 少年バット参上)	Satoshi Kon	Takayuki Hirao	Michiyo Suzuki	Nobutaka Ike	February 3, 2004	May 29, 2005
Tsukiko Sagi, a shy character designer who is having trouble creating her next character, feels pressured and overwhelmed at work. She has already created a very successful character, a pink dog called Maromi, and her boss expects the next character to be even better. On her way home she is startled by a homeless woman rummaging through rubbish. At the height of her despair, she is suddenly attacked by someone carrying a golden baseball bat. When a pair of detectives interrogate her, she describes the suspect as an elementary school-aged boy wearing golden inline skates and a red hat. The younger of the detectives, Maniwa, sympathizes with Tsukiko, but the older, Ikari, suspects her of lying. The media preys on the story, and a sleazy reporter named Akio Kawazu tails Tsukiko in an attempt to get further details. He is then attacked himself.
2	"The Golden Shoes"; Transliteration: "Kin no kutsu" (Japanese: 金の靴)	Satoshi Kon (Note: On this episode only, Kon's storyboarding work is credited under the pseudonym "Yoshihiro Wanibuchi" (鰐淵良宏).)	Takuji Endō	Michiyo Suzuki	Nobutaka Ike	February 10, 2004	June 5, 2005
Yuuichi "Icchi" Taira, a formerly popular sixth-grade schoolboy, starts being bullied at school for his red hat and golden skates which strongly resemble those of Lil' Slugger. The only person he can confide in is his personal tutor, Harumi Chouno. Icchi comes to believe that Shougo Ushiyama, a fatter, less sporty pupil who is running against him for student council president, is the one masterminding the bullying. He accuses Shougo aggressively, but someone takes a picture of their confrontation and texts it to the whole class. Shougo defends him, much to Icchi's embarrassment. Meanwhile, the detectives continue to question Tsukiko, who is now witness to two attacks. They also question Yuuichi. Icchi's birthday comes, but nobody comes to his party except his mother and tutor. Shougo attempts to comfort Yuuichi who just gets angrier, hoping Shougo will be the next victim; almost immediately, Shougo is attacked for real. Eventually Yuuichi goes insane with egopathic delusions of reclaiming his fame before being attacked by Lil' Slugger himself.
3	"Double Lips"; Transliteration: "Daburu Rippu" (Japanese: ダブルリップ)	Atsushi Takahashi	Takuji Endō	Shigeo Akahori	Ryō Kōno	February 17, 2004	June 12, 2005
Harumi Chouno, a woman with dissociative identity disorder, attempts to defy her prostitute alter ego, Maria. Her two personalities leave answering machine messages for each other. Harumi becomes increasingly desperate when a colleague at Jiai University, where she works as a research assistant, proposes marriage. She accepts but is terrified of Maria's existence being found out. She attempts to throw Maria's "work" clothes away, but her personality shifts to that of Maria just as she arrives at the dump and takes them all back. Her psychiatrist insists she must tell her fiancé. Harumi is also Yuuichi's tutor, and while visiting him in the hospital, he remarks that she needs a doctor more than him. Eventually, her personalities seemingly start to fight with each other when Lil' Slugger strikes her.
4	"A Man's Path"; Transliteration: "Otokomichi" (Japanese: 男道)	Atsushi Takahashi	Atsushi Takahashi	Michio Mihara	Nobutaka Ike	February 24, 2004	June 19, 2005
Masami Hirukawa is a portly low-level police officer who, despite calling himself a family man, accepts bribes in the form of cash and women from a local yakuza group. His favorite prostitute is Maria. Masami even purchases a house for his family using this money. However, Masami squeezes the group a bit too much, and they send their boss--oyabun--Makabe to deal with him. Makabe informs Masami that since the leader of the local group is his friend then he will have no objection paying an extraordinary amount as all of his friends are. He reminds Masami that "his friend" gave him money to build his house and, if Masami is not his "friend" then his house just may have to burn down. Makabe punctuates this point by extinguishing his cigarette on Masami's forehead. In desperation, Masami dons dark clothes and a ski mask and begins robbing helpless local families. Makabe gives him stimulants for his courage. Masami attacks a family whose daughter walks in. As he walks alone on a deserted road afterwards, he cries out for help, begging someone to "stop him". Suddenly, he is attacked by Lil' Slugger; however, unlike the other victims, he is not incapacitated and instead chases after his attacker. Masami then arrests Lil' Slugger, who awaits questioning by Ikari and Maniwa.
5	"The Holy Warrior"; Transliteration: "Seisenshi" (Japanese: 聖戦士)	Mamoru Sasaki, Nanako Shimazaki	Nanako Shimazaki	Mamoru Sasaki	Kaoru Inoda	March 9, 2004	June 26, 2005
Ikari and Maniwa interrogate the boy known as Lil' Slugger, who turns out to be an eighth-grade student named Makoto Kozuka. Kozuka admits to the attacks, but he believes that the world around him is a medieval fantasy-style role playing game. Kozuka also believes that in attacking people, he is liberating them from a villain named Gohma who has possessed them. Kozuka retells the chronology of attacks from his game-based perspective, and Ikari and Maniwa follow along. Maniwa, taking an emic point of view, especially gets caught up in Kozuka's role playing. Various characters appear in different guises: Kawazu as a stepped-on frog, Kozuka as a warrior, and Maria as an evil butterfly woman. Maniwa cleverly pretends to be a minstrel who must record all the heroic details. The detectives see that the details of his story correspond to all of the attacks — with the notable exception of the case of Tsukiko Sagi. However, Kozuka points the detectives to someone who he believes can help him take the game to the next level, and who the detectives believe may be an important witness to the initial attack.
6	"Fear of a Direct Hit"; Transliteration: "Chokugeki no fuan" (Japanese: 直撃の不安)	Kōjirō Tsuruoka	Kōjirō Tsuruoka	Hisashi Eguchi	Kaoru Inoda	March 16, 2004	July 3, 2005
Ikari and Maniwa question the old lady who saw the incident with Tsukiko and find out what happened that night. After Ikari, frustrated at the woman's vagueness, yells at her, she admits there was no one there but Tsukiko at the time of her supposed attack. The detectives question Tsukiko and confront her with evidence of the truth: a bent pipe found near the scene which she used on herself. At these words, Tsukiko faints. Meanwhile, Taeko, a runaway teenager, wanders through the stormy city wanting to forget about her past, as her father repeatedly calls her cell phone, but she always answers coldly, saying she will "destroy everything", implying family turmoil. Her father, who she adored, is Masami. Her family had just moved into the new house he built for them when she discovered a file in his computer's recycle bin, which turned out to be a folder of photos of her undressing. Horrified, she smashed her furniture and found a hidden camera behind her bookshelf. As she reaches the brink of despair in the storm, wishing to "become empty", Lil' Slugger knocks her out. She wakes up in the hospital with her father at her side, who explains that their house was destroyed by the storm, telling her that her desire to destroy everything had come true. She giggles and asks him, "Who are you?"
7	"MHz"	Hiroshi Hamasaki	Hiroshi Hamasaki	Akiko Asaki	Ryō Kōno	March 23, 2004	July 10, 2005
After Taeko is attacked while both Tsukiko and Kozuka have alibis, Maniwa considers the possibility of another Lil' Slugger existing and looks for connections between the victims in an attempt to pinpoint who will be next. Kozuka continues to protest that he is a holy warrior, Ikari angrily telling him the first attack was a sham and that he "jumped on a bandwagon". Kozuka admits he only attacked Ushiyama and Hirukawa. Maniwa gets more deeply involved as he finds nearly all the victims felt cornered and pressured by their lives, and each one seemed relieved after being attacked. Maniwa thinks it odd that Ushiyama was the only victim without any worries. Ikari advises Maniwa to take some time off. Kozuka is then found dead in his cell at the feet of another Lil' Slugger, who mysteriously escapes through the police station's walls.
8	"Happy Family Planning"; Transliteration: "Akarui kazokukeikaku" (Japanese: 明るい家族計画)	Satoru Utsunomiya	Satoru Utsunomiya	Satoru Utsunomiya	Nobutaka Ike	April 6, 2004	July 17, 2005 (Note: The UK release of this episode originally had a 1 minute 20 second mandatory cut made by the BBFC. The removed scene shows the three protagonists (including a young girl) attempting to hang themselves. This cut was made in accordance with the Video Recordings Act 1984. The series was released on Blu-ray fully uncut in 2021.)
The three members of a group who formed an internet suicide pact meet each other for the first time in attempt to come up with ways to commit suicide, also hoping to see Lil' Slugger. The two older members of the trio, an old man known as "Fuyubachi" and a young man known as "Zebra", are shocked to discover that the third member, "Kamome", is actually a little girl, and try multiple times in vain to abandon her. She finds them in a vacant house trying to gas themselves with carbon monoxide, but the house is suddenly demolished. They then try to jump in front of a subway train, but another man throws himself in front of the train first, after which Zebra sees the spirit of the man walk away. Finally, the trio try hanging themselves from a tree on a mountainside, but the branch snaps. The men fall down a slope and get separated from Kamome, revealing Zebra's locket contains pictures of him with another man. They decide to go back for Kamome because they fear she will die if left alone in the forest. The trio visit a bathhouse, where it is revealed that Kozuka was part of their suicide pact. They attempt to fall asleep, but see the silhouette of Lil' Slugger. Delighted, Kamome and Zebra run at him with open arms, with Fuyubachi trailing behind, but a terrified Lil' Slugger flees the building. Later, Fuyubachi notices that the three of them do not cast shadows. While singing and skipping hand in hand, the three stop to pose behind a group of girls getting their picture taken by another girl with a digital camera. When the girls check to see how their picture turned out, they are shocked and frightened by what they see in the photo. The camera then zooms in on a condom machine behind the three, which reads "Happy Family Planning".
9	"ETC"	Satoshi Kon; Atsushi Takahashi; Michio Mihara; Rintaro	Atsushi Takahashi; Takuji Endō; Michiyo Suzuki	Toshiyuki Inoue; Hiroshi Hamasaki; Yoshimi Itazu; Kumiko Kawana; Michiyo Suzuki; Michio Mihara; Hideki Hamazu and Junichi Hayama; Masashi Ando	Naruyo Kiriyama; Masako Okada; Ryō Kōno; Nobutaka Ike; Shinichi Uehara	April 13, 2004	July 24, 2005
Four housewives share stories that they have heard about Lil' Slugger. The first tells the story of a teenage boy desperately trying to study for his math exam. During the exam, he sneezes out a math equation; he runs to the toilet, where streams of equations begin coming out of him with each sneeze. A persistent knocking on the stall door starts, which he ignores until he looks up to see Lil' Slugger peering down at him. A teacher enters to find a sea of equations on the floor. In the next story, a young wife is stuck at home with her mother-in-law, who constantly insults and makes demands of her while her husband is away. The wife is about to attack her when there is a knock on the door. Both rush to it, thinking it to be the husband, but on the other side of the door is Lil' Slugger, who knocks out the mother-in-law. Kamohara tells the story of a doctor whose nurses mess up an in-vitro fertilization so that the baby is unrelated to either parent. When the mother-to-be complains about abdominal pains, an ultrasound reveals the developing fetus as a miniature Lil' Slugger. However, the other housewives mock her due to how implausible her story is. The stories grow increasingly farfetched. Shunned by the other housewives, Kamohara returns home and finds her husband, a script editor, on the floor bleeding from a head wound. When he claims Lil' Slugger attacked him, Kamohara reacts with delight and demands to know more details about the attack.
10	"Mellow Maromi"; Transliteration: "Maromi Madoromi" (Japanese: マロミまどろみ)	Tatsuo Satō	Takuji Endō	Junko Abe, Masashi Ando, Katsuya Yamada	Ryō Kōno	April 20, 2004	July 31, 2005
The production staff of Mellow Maromi, an anime based on the famous character designed by Tsukiko, all have difficulties meeting the deadline. Production coordinator Naoyuki Saruta, frequently the cause of everyone's difficulties, is fighting traffic to deliver the first episode of the series to the broadcasting network. Throughout the episode, he nods off, and when he awakens, he frequently sees Lil' Slugger pursuing him, only to disappear. His dreams recount the production of the series, and the gradual murder of the entire production crew. Eventually, Lil' Slugger appears in the car, and Saruta's beaten corpse is later found in front of the TV network's building. As the network staff grab the tape from his hand and rush it inside to air, Maromi is heard saying "take a rest" over and over again.
11	"No Entry"; Transliteration: "Shinnyū kinshi" (Japanese: 進入禁止)	Mamoru Sasaki, Nanako Shimazaki	Nanako Shimazaki	Mamoru Sasaki	Nobutaka Ike	April 27, 2004	August 7, 2005
Lil' Slugger comes for Misae Ikari, the wife of Detective Ikari, but she confronts him about what humans really are and the problems he has caused. She tells him she turned down a life-saving medical treatment that her husband, now a security guard, cannot afford. She tells Lil' Slugger how her life changed when she met Ikari, and how supportive he was even when they discovered she could not have children. Over time, she grew fearful that his devotion to his work was an excuse to avoid her. Lil' Slugger grows to a huge form when she talks about her despair but shrinks back down again every time she dismisses these thoughts as unreasonable. He grows larger again as he prepares to strike her, but she simply laughs. She informs him that humans are not as weak as he thinks they are, and that his existence is pointless as all his attacks do is provide people with a false sense of salvation. Upon hearing this, Lil' Slugger screams and promptly vanishes along with everything around him, after which Misae states that she plans to undergo the operation. Meanwhile, Ikari is just finishing one shift as a construction worker and goes immediately to his security job at another site without returning home. While at his post, he strikes up a conversation with one of his coworkers, and is shocked to learn that the man is actually the first person he arrested as a cop. The man is now old but still serving as an honest member of society. As they talk, Ikari reveals that he always wanted to be an old-fashioned cop catching simple burglars, not psychologically disturbed criminals. Ikari is then transported to a simple retro Japanese fantasy world like the one he wished for. Maniwa turns up looking for Ikari, and Misae is distraught that he has not returned home yet.
12	"Radar Man"; Transliteration: "Rēdā Man" (Japanese: レーダーマン)	Atsushi Takahashi	Atsushi Takahashi	Michio Mihara	Nobutaka Ike	May 11, 2004	August 14, 2005
Maniwa engages in battle with Lil' Slugger and investigates his past. First, he visits the mysterious old man at the hospital just before he dies; his last words to Maniwa are "dance with the rabbit". Misae tells Maniwa that Maromi and Lil' Slugger are the same being. Tsukiko is being interviewed about Maromi's conception, and it is revealed that among her early sketches is one of Lil' Slugger. Maniwa, remembering the old man's words, visits a dollmaker's shop to find the dollmaker there making dolls of all Lil' Slugger's victims. All the dolls speak to Maniwa, telling him they want to defeat Lil' Slugger too. They plug him into an AR link to the Internet, where he accesses Tsukiko's past. He comes across a case from ten years earlier in which Tsukiko was attacked at twelve years old by a figure on rollerblades carrying a golden bat. Maniwa visits Tsukiko's father and finds a golden bat in the family's shed. After discovering the truth, he phones Tsukiko, telling her that her father said not to be afraid. Maromi cuts the phone cable. Maniwa appears and fights a giant, monstrous Lil' Slugger with the original bat. After the fight ends in a draw, Tsukiko and Maromi disappear into the cartoon world, and all traces of Maromi vanish from the human world. At the same time, Misae is rushed to the hospital and falls into a coma.
13	"The Final Episode"; Transliteration: "Saishūkai." (Japanese: 最終回。)	Satoshi Kon	Takuji Endō	Michiyo Suzuki	Nobutaka Ike	May 18, 2004	August 21, 2005
Tokyo is in ruins because of a black mass, formed by the rampaging Lil' Slugger, that envelops the city. Maniwa contacts the police chief on a screen in the cartoon world telling him what he knows, but Ikari smashes the screen with a rock. Maromi becomes a real dog, and Tsukiko becomes her twelve-year-old self and calls Ikari "dad". Ikari muses how he always wanted a daughter, but when Misae appears, he remembers how he once told her that people should not create fantasy worlds to escape from reality. He smashes the cartoon world apart with the golden bat to reveal a ruined Tokyo and a sea of Maromi toys. Maniwa tells Ikari the truth about Lil' Slugger - Maromi was based on a real puppy Tsukiko had in her childhood, who ran into traffic and was killed one day when a painful menstrual cramp caused her to let go of Maromi's leash. Fearing punishment from her strict father, Tsukiko invented a story about Lil' Slugger and blamed him for the attack. The black blob pursues Maromi, Tsukiko and Ikari into the subway, but they are eventually submerged. As she sinks, Tsukiko has a flashback to the original event, where she comforts her younger self and accepts responsibility for the death of the real Maromi, stopping the black blob - and the Lil' Slugger attacks - once and for all. Two years later, Tokyo has finally recovered. Tsukiko, now an office worker, impassively views a commercial for a popular new mascot character. Ikari is still a security guard, while Kawazu is still a reporter. Maniwa, whose hair has turned completely white, is now doing the same complex equation in chalk on the street that the old man once did. In the final scene, he pauses writing and gasps. The last two characters he writes are "a" and "ni," and the position of his hand suggests that the character he is about to write is "me," exactly mirroring the first episode.
