= The Deer King =

Japanese novel series

- First novel reprinted volume cover

鹿の王 (Shika no Ō)
- Genre: Fantasy
- Novel series
- Written by: Nahoko Uehashi
- Illustrated by: HACCAN
- Published by: Kadokawa
- English publisher: NA: Yen Press
- Original run: September 25, 2014 – March 27, 2019
- Volumes: 2 (first edition); 4 + 1 extra (second edition)
- Manga
- Written by: Nahoko Uehashi
- Illustrated by: Taro Sekiguchi
- Published by: Kadokawa Shoten
- English publisher: NA: Yen Press
- Magazine: Young Ace Up
- Original run: July 26, 2021 – March 2, 2022
- Volumes: 2
- Anime film
- Directed by: Masashi Ando; Masayuki Miyaji
- Written by: Taku Kishimoto
- Music by: Harumi Fuuki
- Studio: Production I.G
- Licensed by: NA: GKIDS; UK: Anime Limited
- Released: June 14, 2021 (Annecy); February 4, 2022 (Japan)
- Runtime: 114 minutes
- icon

The Deer King (Japanese: 鹿の王, Hepburn: Shika no Ō; lit. "King of Deer") is a Japanese fantasy novel series written by Nahoko Uehashi. Kadokawa published the original novel in two volumes in September 2014, and then republished it in four reprinted volumes between June and July 2017. A manga adaptation with art by Taro Sekiguchi was serialized online via Kadokawa Shoten's Young Ace Up website between July 2021 and March 2022. It was collected in two tankōbon volumes. An anime film adaptation produced by Production I.G premiered on February 4, 2022.

== Plot ==
In the years following a vicious war, the Empire of Zol now controls the land and citizens of rival Aquafa-except for Aquafa's Fire Horse Territory, where wild dogs that once carried the deadly Black Wolf Fever continue to roam free. When a pack of dogs race through a Zol-controlled mine, Van, an enslaved former soldier, and a young girl named Yuna are both bitten, but manage to escape as the sole survivors of the attack. Finally free, Van and Yuna seek out a simple, peaceful existence in the countryside. But as the deadly disease once again runs rampant, they find themselves at the crossroads of a struggle much larger than any one nation.

== Characters ==
Van (ヴァン, Van)
Voiced by: Shinichi Tsutsumi (Japanese); Ray Chase (English)
Hohsalle (ホッサル, Hossaru)
Voiced by: Ryoma Takeuchi (Japanese); Griffin Puatu (English)
Sae (サエ, Sae)
Voiced by: Anne Watanabe (Japanese); Erica Schroeder (English)
Yuna (ユナ, Yuna)
Voiced by: Hisui Kimura (Japanese); Luciana VanDette (English)

== Media ==
=== Novels ===
During their Sakura-Con 2023 panel, Yen Press announced that they licensed the novels.

No.	Original release date	Original ISBN	English release date	English ISBN
1	June 17, 2017	978-4-04-105489-5	September 19, 2023	978-1-9753-5233-2
2	June 17, 2017	978-4-04-105508-3	January 23, 2024	978-1-9753-5236-3
3	July 25, 2017	978-4-04-105509-0	April 13, 2027	979-8-8554-1296-3
4	July 25, 2017	978-4-04-105510-6	—	—
Ex	June 12, 2020	978-4-04-109292-7	—	—

=== Manga ===
During their Sakura-Con 2023 panel, Yen Press announced that they also licensed the manga.

No.	Original release date	Original ISBN	English release date	English ISBN
1	September 10, 2021	978-4-04-111811-5	September 19, 2023	978-1-9753-6040-5
2	March 10, 2022	978-4-04-111812-2	January 23, 2024	978-1-9753-6300-0

=== Anime film ===
An anime adaptation was announced on June 21, 2018. It was later announced to be an anime film adaptation produced by Production I.G. The film is directed by Masashi Ando and Masayuki Miyaji, with Ando designing the characters, Taku Kishimoto handling the scripts, and Harumi Fuuki composing the film's music. Closing credits feature the song One Reason by Milet. The movie was originally scheduled to premiere on September 18, 2020, but was delayed to September 10, 2021, due to undisclosed reasons. The film was delayed again in August 2021 due to the COVID-19 pandemic. It premiered on February 4, 2022.

The film had its world premiere in the official feature film competition at Annecy International Animation Film Festival on June 14, 2021. It has been licensed for release in the United Kingdom, Ireland, and French-speaking Europe by Anime Limited. Selecta Visión acquired the distribution rights for Spain, with a theatrical release date set for June 9, 2022. GKIDS acquired the film for release in North America and screened it in both Japanese with English subtitles and an English dub on July 13, 2022.

== Reception ==
Rebecca Silverman of Anime News Network gave the first volume 4.5/5 stars. She wrote, "in the Makokan segments, it reads like a fantasy version of the nonfiction book The Ghost Map, about efforts to discover the root cause of cholera", and concluded, "How all of this will come together isn't clear, but it's going to be a fascinating journey to follow. This is one of those books that you could give to your friend who doesn't care for light novels but reads fantasy, and it's worth picking up."
