= Masayuki Miyaji =

Japanese anime director

- Born: Miyaji Masayuki 宮地 昌幸; February 1, 1976 (age 50)
- Occupations: Anime director and supervisor
- Years active: 1998–present

Masayuki Miyaji (宮地 昌幸, Miyaji Masayuki), (born February 1, 1976), is a Japanese anime director and supervisor.

== Biography ==
Upon graduating from Nihon University's art department's school of film, Miyaji took part in Studio Ghibli's Higashi-Koganei Sonjoku training program in 1998. He studied under the program along with fellow future animator Tadashi Okumura. The promise he showed in the program led him to be selected as assistant director to Hayao Miyazaki in Spirited Away.

In 2008, he made his full directorial debut with Xam'd: Lost Memories. In an interview to The Japan Times, Miyaji stated that he believed anime was a part of the film industry and said, in respect to Xam'd's "theatrical dimension", he had wished to use an "almost documentary style" for certain parts and listed directors Ken Loach and Jean-Luc Godard as his inspirations. He also stated with the series' unique PlayStation Network release, he felt he could reach out to a "different kind" of audience.

== Works ==
- My Neighbors the Yamadas (production assistant)
- Spirited Away (assistant director)
- Mei and the Kittenbus (assistant director)
- InuYasha (storyboards)
- Bakumatsu Kikansetsu Irohanihoheto (storyboards)
- Detective Conan (storyboards)
- Zoids: Genesis (storyboards)
- Overman King Gainer (storyboards, episode direction)
- Gekitō! Crush Gear TURBO (episode direction)
- Scrapped Princess (episode direction)
- Blood+ (storyboards)
- Eureka Seven (storyboards)
- Tenpō Ibun Ayakashi Ayashi (storyboards, episode direction, OP2 direction and storyboards)
- Kenran Butōsai: The Mars Daybreak (storyboards)
- Jyu Oh Sei (storyboards)
- Xam'd: Lost Memories (director)
- Fuse Teppō Musume no Torimonochō (director)
- Blade Runner: Black Lotus (storyboards)
- The Deer King (director, with Masashi Ando)
