= World Apartment Horror =

- Theatrical release poster
- Directed by: Katsuhiro Otomo
- Screenplay by: Katsuhiro Otomo; Keiko Nobumoto
- Story by: Satoshi Kon
- Produced by: Yoshihiro Kato; Yasuhisa Kazama
- Starring: Hiroki Tanaka
- Cinematography: Noboru Shinoda
- Production companies: General Entertainment Co. Ltd.; Sony Music Entertainment
- Release date: 5 April 1991 (Japan)
- Running time: 97 minutes
- Country: Japan
- Language: Japanese

World Apartment Horror (Japanese: ワールド・アパートメント・ホラー, Hepburn: Wārudo Apātomento Horā) is a 1991 Japanese comedy horror film directed by Katsuhiro Otomo, with a screenplay by Otomo and Keiko Nobumoto from a story by Satoshi Kon. The film stars Sabu (credited as Hiroki Tanaka) as a yakuza henchman who encounters the language barrier and evil spirits in his attempts to evict a Tokyo apartment full of foreigners.

Sabu received the Best New Actor Award at the Yokohama Film Festival in 1992. A manga adaptation by Kon was published by Kodansha, under the same title, on August 1, 1991.
