= Paranoia Agent =

Japanese anime television series

- Key visual for the series

妄想代理人 (Mōsō Dairinin)
- Genre: Mystery; Psychological thriller; Supernatural
- Created by: Satoshi Kon
- Anime television series
- Directed by: Satoshi Kon
- Produced by: Rika Tsuruzaki; Mitsuru Uda; Hideki Gotō; Yasuteru Iwase; Tokuji Hasegawa
- Written by: Seishi Minakami
- Music by: Susumu Hirasawa
- Studio: Madhouse
- Licensed by: Crunchyroll (Note: In North America through Crunchyroll, LLC (formerly known as Funimation))
- Original network: Wowow
- English network: CA: G4TechTV (Anime Current); US: Adult Swim (Toonami); ZA: Animax
- Original run: February 3, 2004 – May 18, 2004
- Episodes: 13
- Novel
- Written by: Satoshi Kon; Yuichi Umezu
- Published by: Kadokawa Shoten
- Imprint: Horror Bunko
- Published: May 2004
- icon

Paranoia Agent (Japanese: 妄想代理人, Hepburn: Mōsō Dairinin) is a Japanese anime television series created by director Satoshi Kon and produced by Madhouse. The series focuses on a social phenomenon in Musashino, Tokyo caused by a juvenile serial assailant named Lil' Slugger (the English equivalent to Shōnen Bat, which translates to "Bat Boy"). The plot relays between a large cast of people affected in some way by the phenomenon; usually Lil' Slugger's victims or the detectives assigned to apprehend him. As each character becomes the focus of the story, details are revealed about their secret lives and the truth about Lil' Slugger.

== Plot ==
Tsukiko Sagi, a shy character designer who created the immensely popular pink dog Maromi, finds herself under pressure to repeat her success. As she walks home one night, she is attacked by an elementary school boy on inline skates. Two police detectives, Keiichi Ikari and Mitsuhiro Maniwa, are assigned to the case. They suspect that Tsukiko is lying about the attack, until they receive word of a second victim.

Soon the attacker, dubbed Lil' Slugger (Shōnen Batto in Japanese, meaning "Bat Boy"), is blamed for a series of street assaults in Tokyo. None of the victims can recall the boy's face and only three distinct details are left in their memories: golden inline skates, a baseball cap, and the weapon: a bent golden baseball bat. Ikari and Maniwa set out to track down the perpetrator and put an end to his crimes.

=== Names ===
Many of the characters in Paranoia Agent are often referred to with animal names, especially in each "Prophetic Vision" (a segment at the end of each episode that previews the next) and the episode "The Holy Warrior", in which some characters are depicted as animal-like creatures. In many cases, their Japanese names translate directly to the type of animal which they are referred to as: "sagi" means heron, "kawazu" is an archaic term for frog, "ushi" means cow, "tai" means sea bream or red snapper, "chō" means butterfly (chō-cho can also mean butterfly, possibly alluding to her split personality), and "hiru" means leech. "Kamome" means seagull.

== Characters ==
=== Main characters ===
Tsukiko Sagi (鷺 月子, Sagi Tsukiko)
Voiced by: Mamiko Noto (Japanese); Michelle Ruff (English)
Tsukiko is a character designer who created the popular character Maromi. She is allegedly the first victim of Lil' Slugger's attacks. At the end of the series, it is revealed that she had also unconsciously created Lil' Slugger. When she was younger, the dog Maromi was based on her real dog who was killed after wandering away from Tsukiko and getting hit by a car. Not wanting to upset her father, Tsukiko claimed the dog was killed by a boy on roller blades carrying a bat, which would later manifest itself as Lil' Slugger.
Lil' Slugger (少年バット, Shōnen Batto; lit. 'Boy with Bat')
Voiced by: Daisuke Sakaguchi (Japanese); Sam Riegel (English)
An enigmatic serial assailant who appears to be a sixth-grade elementary student and is identifiable by his golden roller blades, baseball cap and bent golden baseball bat. He appears before people who are mentally pushed into a corner and attacks them with his bat. He is later shown not to be human, but is instead a mysterious, elusive entity who grows stronger with the power of rumour and speculation. It is revealed at the end to be the creation of Tsukiko, who imagined him to avoid blame for the death of her dog.
Maromi (マロミ, Maromi)
Voiced by: Haruko Momoi (Japanese); Carrie Savage (English)
Maromi is a character appearing as a pink puppy created by Tsukiko Sagi who has accumulated a large degree of popularity among the masses. Maromi was modeled after a dog that Tsukiko owned in her youth. She also serves as Tsukiko's conscience as well as her imaginary friend.
Keiichi Ikari (猪狩 慶一, Ikari Keiichi)
Voiced by: Shōzō Iizuka (Japanese); Michael McConnohie (English)
The chief detective in charge of investigating the Lil' Slugger case. He is a tough middle-aged man with a critically ill wife and does not believe in the supernatural.
Mitsuhiro Maniwa (馬庭 光弘, Maniwa Mitsuhiro)
Voiced by: Toshihiko Seki (Japanese); Liam O'Brien (English)
A detective assisting Keiichi Ikari in the Lil' Slugger case and doubling as his foil in personality. Unlike Keiichi, he is a lot more intrigued by some of the stranger aspects of the case, often bringing himself closer to insanity in order to solve the case.

=== Supporting characters ===
Mysterious Old Woman (謎の老婆, Nazo no Rōba)
Voiced by: Hisako Kyōda (Japanese); Melora Harte (English)
A homeless woman who dwells near the scene of Lil' Slugger's attack on Tsukiko, of which she is a witness.
Misae Ikari (猪狩 みさえ, Ikari Misae)
Voiced by: Kazue Komiya (Japanese); Melodee Spevack (English)
Keiichi Ikari's wife. She is seriously ill but, despite her illness, she wants to live and remains faithful to her husband. When Lil' Slugger appears before her, she manages to fight him off with her own willpower. She later passes away from a heart attack, but not before managing to free Keiichi from a delusional world.
Mysterious Old Man (謎の老人, Nazo no Rōjin)
Voiced by: Ryūji Saikachi (Japanese); William Frederick Knight (English)
A senile hospital patient who possesses the ability to predict and identify all of Lil' Slugger's victims.
Akio Kawazu (川津 明雄, Kawazu Akio)
Voiced by: Kenji Utsumi (Japanese); Doug Stone (English)
A gossip journalist attempting to cover the Lil' Slugger case. He is indebted to the Old Man's son after causing a traffic accident involving the Mysterious Old Man and is forced to pay his hospital bills as consolation. He becomes Lil' Slugger's second victim while attempting to interrogate Tsukiko Sagi and gather information for his next article. He is skilled in impressions and demonstrates this talent to Tsukiko by flawlessly mimicking her co-workers.
Yūichi Taira (鯛良 優一, Taira Yūichi)
Voiced by: Mayumi Yamaguchi (Japanese); Johnny Yong Bosch (English)
A cool-natured and narcissistic elementary school student who lives near the scene of the original Lil' Slugger attacks. His personal tutor is Harumi Chōno, whom he is emotionally close to. He is initially popular due to his intelligence and athleticism, but because of his golden roller blades and baseball cap, he becomes associated with the recent Lil' Slugger attacks and becomes the subject of ostracism. Following Lil' Slugger's attack on Shōgo Ushiyama (whom he disliked for stealing his popularity), he secludes himself into his room and is reduced to a delusively paranoid state before becoming Lil' Slugger's third victim.
Shōgo Ushiyama (牛山 尚吾, Ushiyama Shōgo)
Voiced by: Makoto Tsumura (Japanese); Steven Bendik (English)
An elementary school student who transferred to Yūichi's school on the advice of his school counselor to positively assert himself. He does so by running for the office of school president. Yūichi believes Shōgo to be a two-faced schemer who is behind the current attacks on Yūichi's reputation to boost his own popularity, when in reality he is a kindhearted youth who seeks to better himself by being positive and helpful whenever he can. He becomes the victim of a Lil' Slugger imposter while on his way home from school.
Harumi Chōno (蝶野 晴美, Chōno Harumi)
Voiced by: Kotono Mitsuishi (Japanese); Erica Shaffer (English)
An office lady who works as a personal tutor for Yūichi Taira. Harumi possesses an alternate personality named Maria (まりあ, Maria), who works as a prostitute. The two personalities communicate via an answering machine. After being engaged and married to her superior Akihiko Kase (voiced by Toshio Kobayashi and Lance J. Holt), Harumi repeatedly attempts to repress the manifestation of Maria, which proves futile. In the apex of her conflict with Maria, Harumi becomes Lil' Slugger's fourth victim.
Masami Hirukawa (蛭川 雅美, Hirukawa Masami)
Voiced by: Toshihiko Nakajima (Japanese); Deem Bristow (English)
A corrupt police chief who often watches his daughter Taeko undress through the use of a hidden surveillance camera. He attempts to have a new house built for his family using illegally obtained money to fund the project. He manages to arrest a Lil' Slugger imposter when an attack attempt is made on him. The house he attempts to build is eventually destroyed in a landslide brought on by a typhoon. He is fond of women and is a regular customer of the prostitute Maria. He later becomes Lil' Slugger's fifth victim.
Makoto Kozuka (狐塚 誠, Kozuka Makoto)
Voiced by: Daisuke Sakaguchi (Japanese); Sam Riegel (English)
A middle schooler under the impression that he is a holy warrior when he is in fact a lunatic unable to distinguish reality from his fantasies. He is arrested under suspicion of being behind the Lil' Slugger attacks, although he soon confesses that the only ones he attacked were Shōgo and Masami. He is soon killed by the real Lil' Slugger, becoming his seventh victim.
Taeko Hirukawa (蛭川 妙子, Hirukawa Taeko)
Voiced by: Nana Mizuki (Japanese); Kari Wahlgren (English)
The only daughter of Masami Hirukawa. She is seen to be very close to her father, admiring him deeply. After discovering her father's disgusting actions, she becomes Lil' Slugger's sixth victim and contracts amnesia as a result of the attack.
Kamome (かもめ), Fuyubachi (冬蜂), and Zebra (ゼブラ, Zebura)
Voiced by: Miina Tominaga, Kiyoshi Kawakubo and Yasunori Matsumoto (Japanese); Stephanie Sheh, Doug Stone and Patrick Seitz (English)
A trio of people, a young girl, an old man and a tall gay man, who meet up from the internet to perform a suicide pact together.

=== Mellow Maromi Staff ===
The production staff of Mellow Maromi, an anime that features Maromi as the main character.

Nobunaga Oda and Naoyuki Saruta
Voiced by: Daiki Nakamura and Hiroyuki Yoshino (Japanese); Richard Cansino and John E. Breen (English)
The two most prominent members of the staff who are the production managers. Saruta is an incompetent and clumsy slacker who constantly causes problems for the production, resulting in a highly stressful work environment, while Oda is a short-tempered man who frequently assaults and humiliates Saruta whenever he makes a mistake. The two gradually become unhinged as production goes on, and after Oda angrily fires Saruta, Saruta beats him to death and takes the finished copy of the first episode, planning to drive it to the studio, only to be pursued by Lil Slugger, who suddenly appears in the back of his car and beats him to death. Saruta's corpse is later found outside the network station.

=== Other characters ===
Masashi Kamei (亀井 正志, Kamei Masashi)
Voiced by: Akio Suyama (Japanese); Jonathan C. Osborne (English)
An otaku and a regular customer of Maria. He makes short appearances in the first and third episodes, as well as the twelfth.
Junji Handa (半田 順次, Handa Junji)
Voiced by: Daisuke Gōri (Japanese); Howard Clarendon (English)
A yakuza affiliated with Masami Hirukawa.
Shunsuke Makabe (真壁 俊介, Makabe Shunsuke)
Voiced by: Keiji Fujiwara (Japanese); Kirk Thornton (English)
A sadistic lackey of Junji Handa who attempts to collect 2,000,000 yen from Masami to give to Handa as a token of congratulations for his engagement. When Masami is unable to provide this amount within the given deadline, Makabe increases the debt to 5,000,000 yen.

== Production ==
During the makings of his previous three films (Perfect Blue, Millennium Actress, and Tokyo Godfathers), Paranoia Agent creator Satoshi Kon was left with an abundance of unused ideas for stories and arrangements that he felt were good but did not fit into any of his projects. Not wanting to waste the material, he decided to recycle it into a dynamic TV series in which his experimental ideas could be used.

In the case of a film to be shown at theatres, I'm working for two years and a half, always in the same mood and with the same method. I wanted to do something that allows me to be more flexible, to realize instantly what flashes across my mind. I was also aiming at a sort of entertaining variation, so I decided to go for a TV series.

== Media ==
=== Anime ===
The series aired on Japan's Wowow from February 3 to May 18, 2004. Geneon Entertainment licensed the anime in North America and released the series on four DVDs from October 26, 2004, and May 10, 2005. A UMD version of Volume 1 was made available on October 10, 2005. Madman Entertainment released the series in Australia. An English dub began airing in the U.S. on Cartoon Network's Adult Swim on May 29, 2005, followed by an encore airing that began on June 6, 2006. In Canada, it began a run on digital channel G4TechTV's Anime Current programming block on July 27, 2007. The anime is distributed by MVM Films in the UK. The series was shown theatrically in 2008 at Film Society of Lincoln Center as part of retrospective of Kon's films. On February 3, 2020, Funimation announced that it had licensed the series for its streaming platform. On April 15, 2020, Adult Swim announced that the English dub would be rebroadcast for the first time in over a decade on its Toonami programming block due to COVID-19 pandemic that affected half of the programs new episodes putting it on halt. The Blu-ray collection of the series was released in the U.S. on October 13, 2020, in SteelBook packaging as a Best Buy exclusive, and received a general Blu-ray release on December 15, 2020.

=== Music ===
The music in Paranoia Agent was composed by Japanese electronica pioneer Susumu Hirasawa. The opening theme "Dream Island Obsessional Park" (夢の島思念公園, Yume no Shima Shinen Kōen) and the ending theme "White Hill – Maromi's Theme" (白ヶ丘~マロミのテーマ, Shirogaoka ~ Maromi no tēma) are performed by Hirasawa.

=== Proposed film ===
In December 2009, Japanese cult-film director Takashi Shimizu announced plans for a film adaptation of the anime. However, plans eventually fell through and ultimately no film was ever made.

== Reception ==
Review aggregator website Rotten Tomatoes gives the series the rare approval rating of 100% based on 13 critic reviews, with an average rating of 7.7/10. The site's critical consensus reads, "Anime auteur Satoshi Kon brings his feverish vision to the serialized form in Paranoia Agent, a disturbing meditation on individual and societal anxiety." Paranoia Agent was one of the Jury Recommended Works in the Animation Division at the 8th Japan Media Arts Festival in 2004.

Charles Solomon from NPR says, "Paranoia Agent may frustrate viewers who expect a straightforward narrative, but it's a disturbing, highly original work from a talented filmmaker." John Powers, also from NPR, remarks, "It's one of the best and strangest programs I have ever seen... Kon does something daring. He reveals the fierce sadness and pain hidden by the modern embrace of things that are cute." A review in Empire awarded Paranoia Agent 3 out of 5 stars, saying, "for those who like their animation 'out there', Satoshi Kon's Paranoia Agent delivers by the oddball bucketload". Jean-Luc Bouchard from BuzzFeed praised Paranoia Agent as a depiction of depression, writing, "The entire series totals a mere 13 episodes, but it drew me in immediately, and introduced me to a dark cast of characters whose troubled minds changed not just their own perceptions, but each other's realities as well."

James Beckett of Anime News Network gave the anime an A, and describes the series as "What is the most important thing to remember about Paranoia Agent is that it is a mystery story where the answers to the mysteries are not as important as the questions they raise. A haunting and deeply felt fable of human experiences told with Satoshi Kon's signature flair, eerie and funny in equal measure, visuals that will stick with you for years to come". A review for IGN gave the first three episodes of Paranoia Agent a score of 7/10, comparing it to the works of David Lynch, but criticizing the animation as "downright primitive in places". John Maher from Paste listed Paranoia Agent as the 14th best anime series of all time, comparing it to Kon's other works Paprika and Perfect Blue, adding, "it's every bit the sublime exercise in psychological thriller as either".
