= Animage =

Japanese anime and entertainment magazine

- September 1997 cover, featuring the artwork of the Studio Ghibli film, Princess Mononoke
- Editor: Hisae Kawai (2014–present)
- Former editors: Hideo Ogata (1978–1986); Toshio Suzuki (1986–1989); Takao Sasaki (1989); Mikio Takeda (1990–1992); Susumu Arakawa (1992–1995); Takashi Watanabe (1995–1998); Toshiya Matsushita (1998–2002, 2005–2014); Shūichi Ōno (2002–2005)
- Categories: Anime, manga, voice acting
- Frequency: Monthly
- Circulation: 65,660 (2009)
- First issue: 26 May 1978 (July issue)
- Company: Tokuma Shoten
- Country: Japan
- Based in: Tokyo
- Language: Japanese
- Website: Official site

Animage (Japanese: アニメージュ, Hepburn: Animēju) is a Japanese anime and entertainment magazine published by Tokuma Shoten since July 1978. Notable works serialized in the magazine include Hayao Miyazaki's manga Nausicaä of the Valley of the Wind (1982–1994) and Saeko Himuro's novel Ocean Waves (1990–1992).

== History ==
Animage was established in 1978 as the first magazine devoted to animation and comics aimed at a general public and not professionals. In 2007 the magazine started its online edition.

== Anime Grand Prix ==
The Anime Grand Prix is the annual prize decided by the readers' votes to the anime of the year. The Anime Grand Prix began in 1979, with the first award announced in the January 1980 edition, usually in the June edition of each year. It is also the readers' choice of Anime Grand Prix magazine.

== Voice Animage ==
Voice Animage ボイスアニメージュ
- Cover of an issue of Voice Animage
- Former editors: Hideaki Kobayashi; Takashi Watanabe
- First issue: 1994; 32 years ago
- Company: Tokuma Shoten
- Country: Japan
- Language: Japanese
- Website: animage.jp/now-voiceanimage/

Voice Animage (ボイスアニメージュ, Boisu Animēju) is a sister magazine launched in 1994 that covers the voice acting industry in Japan. It was published irregularly at first, then settled into a regular release every other month. The magazine was edited by Hideaki Kobayashi together with Takashi Watanabe before Kobayashi moved to work on various Kadokawa Shoten magazines, and the magazine suspended publication in February 2002 with its 42nd issue. At Kadokawa, Kobayashi and Watanabe helped launch Voice Newtype.

Beginning in February 2009, Voice Animage resumed publication as a quarterly magazine. The magazine has focused mainly on male voice actors since relaunching.

AniRadi also began publishing VoiceRadimage (ボイスラジメージュ, Boisu Radimēju) as a play on the name of Voice Animage.

== See also ==
- Seraphim: 266613336 Wings

== General sources ==
- Patten, Fred (2004). Watching Anime, Reading Manga: 25 Years of Essays and Reviews. Stone Bridge Press. ISBN 1880656922.
