= Megahertz Stakes =

Annual horse race in California

- Class: Grade III
- Location: Santa Anita Park; Arcadia, California, United States
- Inaugurated: 2011
- Race type: Thoroughbred - Flat racing - Turf
- Website: www.santaanita.com

Race information
- Distance: 1 mile
- Surface: Turf
- Track: Left-handed
- Qualification: Fillies and Mares, four years old and older
- Weight: 124 lbs with allowances
- Purse: $100,000 (since 2016)

The Megahertz Stakes is a Grade III American Thoroughbred horse race for fillies and mares that are four years old or older, over a distance of 1 mile on the turf held annually in January at Santa Anita Park, Arcadia, California. The event currently carries a purse of $100,000.

== History ==
The race was inaugurated in 2011 and the event was run over the 1 mile distance.

The event is named in honor of the British mare Megahertz (GB) who was trained by the National Museum of Racing and Hall of Fame trainer Robert J. Frankel. Megahertz won two Grade I events including the 2005 Yellow Ribbon Stakes which was run at Santa Anita Park and the GII Santa Barbara Handicap twice (2003–2004).

In 2016 the event was upgraded to a Grade III event.

== Records ==
Speed record:

- 1 mile: 1:33.09 - A Jealous Woman (2013)

Margins:

- 3 1/4 lengths – Vamo a Galupiar (CHI) (2012)

Most wins by a jockey:

- 2 – Flavien Prat (2019, 2024)

Most wins by a trainer

- 2 – John Shirreffs (2016, 2020)
- 2 – Neil D. Drysdale (2012, 2018)
- 2 – Philip D'Amato (2015, 2024)
- 2 – Doug F. O'Neill (2014, 2026)

== Winners ==
Year	Winner	Age	Jockey	Trainer	Owner	Distance	Time	Purse	Grade	Ref
2026	Princesa Moche (PER)	6	Mirco Demuro	Doug F. O'Neill	Rancho San Roberto	1 mile	1:36.09	$102,000	III	
2025	Rashmi	5	Frankie Dettori	Jonathan Thomas	Augustin Stables	1 mile	1:34.19	$101,000	III	
2024	Bellabel (IRE)	5	Flavien Prat	Philip D'Amato	Agave Racing Stable, Benowitz Family Trust, CYBT, Michael Nentwig & Ray Pagano	1 mile	1:36.16	$101,000	III	
2023	Quattroelle (IRE)	5	Hector Berrios	Jeff Mullins	Red Baron's Farm and Rancho Temescal	1 mile	1:35.04	$101,000	III	
2022	Canoodling	4	Roimes Chirinos	Mike Puype	B4 Farms	1 mile	1:37.30	$101,000	III	
2021	Mucho Unusual	4	Joel Rosario	Tim Yakteen	George Krikorian	1 mile	1:35.89	$98,000	III	
2020	Carressa	4	Victor Espinoza	John Shirreffs	Mercedes Stables, West Point Thor., S. Dilworth, D.&D. Ingordo & S.F. Mooney	1 mile	1:34.64	$101,000	III	
2019	Vasilika	5	Flavien Prat	Jerry Hollendorfer	All Schlaich Stables, Hollendorfer, Gatto Racing, & G. Todaro	1 mile	1:34.82	$100,351	III	
2018	Madame Stripes (ARG)	6	Kent J. Desormeaux	Neil D. Drysdale	Gainesway Stable	1 mile	1:34.24	$100,690	III	
2017	Prize Exhibit (GB)	5	Mike E. Smith	James M. Cassidy	D P Racing	1 mile	1:35.56	$100,690	III	
2016	Keri Belle	5	Alex O. Solis	John Shirreffs	Mr. & Mrs. Jerome S. Moss	1 mile	1:36.30	$101,750	III	
2015	Fanticola	5	Martin Garcia	Philip D'Amato	Anthony Fanticola & Josep Scardino	1 mile	1:35.11	$81,250	Listed	
2014	Dancingtothestars	6	Mario Gutierrez	Doug F. O'Neill	Ren-Mar Thoroughbred	1 mile	1:33.77	$91,000	Listed	
2013	A Jealous Woman	7	Brice Blanc	Francis Meza	Three Cent Stable	1 mile	1:33.09	$92,500	Listed	
2012	Vamo a Galupiar (CHI)	5	Joseph Talamo	Neil D. Drysdale	Robert S. Evans	1 mile	1:34.95	$78,500	Listed	
2011	It Tiz	4	David R. Flores	Mark Glatt	Allen & Susan Branch	1 mile	1:34.83	$79,150	Listed	
