= Opus (manga) =

Manga series

- The cover of the first volume of Opus, showing a page from the manga
- Genre: Action, metacomic
- Manga
- Written by: Satoshi Kon
- Published by: Gakken; Tokuma Shoten
- English publisher: Dark Horse Comics
- Magazine: Comic Guys
- Original run: October 1995 – June 1996
- Volumes: 2

Opus is a Japanese seinen manga series written and illustrated by Satoshi Kon. The story is about a manga artist who is pulled into the world of the manga he is concluding and forced to confront his characters. The manga was serialized in the manga magazine Comic Guys from October 1995 until the magazine's cancellation in June 1996. It was collected into two volumes by Tokuma Shoten on December 13, 2010, and included a missing ending found after Kon's death. Dark Horse Comics licensed the manga in North America and released it in an omnibus edition on December 9, 2014. The French edition of the manga won the 2013 Asia Critics Prize from the Association des Critiques et des journalistes de Bande Dessinée and was nominated for the Sélection Officiele at the 2014 Angoulême International Comics Festival. Opus was Kon's final manga before he debuted in the anime industry with Perfect Blue.

== Plot ==
Manga artist Chikara Nagai is in the process of ending his current serial, Resonance, by having the heroine, investigator and telepath Satoko Miura, fight the brainwashing cult leader of the "Nameless Faith", the Masque, and having the esper Lin sacrifice himself to defeat the Masque. While working late to meet his deadline, he encounters the angry Lin stealing the two-page spread of his death and Nagai is sucked into his manga in the middle of a fight between Satoko and the Masque. She helps him escape, but meanwhile, the Masque brainwashes Chief Hanamura of the Special Forces to find them. When Lin finds the Masque, they fight outside of the boundaries of the manga that were drawn, revealing cracks that lead to other pages. When the chief finds Satoko, Lin attempts to escape through a crack with her, but Satoko is shot in the process. Nagai falls through the bottom of the world and ends up back in the real world, but finds that he cannot draw Lin and finish the final spread. Frustrated, he breaks into the sketch of an alternate ending, rescuing Satoko from being shot by the chief and bringing her into the real world. Satoko explores the area and while reading the manga about her, finds Lin appearing in an earlier volume. From her experience, she determines that Nagai's world is just as cruel as hers and they resolve to save her world.

When they go back, they find that the manga's world is disintegrating and the Masque and Hanamura try to kill them again. The world disappears, save for Nagai. He finds Lin's sister Mei, who gives him his lost pen, and he redraws Satoko. They travel back to the first volume of Resonance, where Satoko was the target of a serial killer, but was saved by the police detective and telepath Sawamura, who died in the process and was reincarnated as Lin. Nagai suggests that they avoid interfering with the story, but when they interact with characters from the world, cracks start forming. Lin finds the killer, the precursor to the Masque, and tries to kill him, but is stopped by Nagai and Satoko. After the younger Satoko is kidnapped, the group and a wounded Sawamura try to save her. The killer finds a copy of Resonance and foresees an ambush by Sawamura, killing him. Lin is shot while trying to stop him but kills the serial killer, releasing the older Masque who had hidden inside his body. The freed Masque takes control of the world and the party falls into the world of the second volume.

Unable to do anything, the group continues falling as Nagai declares that it is "the end." Satoshi Kon, the artist of Opus, is informed of the cancellation of "Comic Guard" magazine and laments the fact that he could have finished the story in three chapters. Later, he calls his editor and tells him about a final chapter he is working on for an abrupt ending, but cannot draw it because he is busy with Perfect Blue. Nagai appears out of the chapter and admonishes him for not completing his story, offering ideas for getting it published. Kon's wife arrives home and screams at the sight of Nagai.

== Release ==
The manga was serialized in Gakken's bi-monthly manga magazine Comic Guys starting in October 1995 until the cancellation of the magazine in June 1996. As Kon started working on Perfect Blue and focusing on his anime career, Opus was put on permanent hiatus and Kon later came to refer to it as a failure. Tokuma Shoten collected the 19 chapters into two volumes published on December 13, 2010, under its Ryu Comics imprint, adding a missing ending found after Kon's death. The final chapter, found in Kon's files, was never finished or published and was included by the publisher to help readers "understand the intent of the story". During Sakura-Con 2014, Dark Horse Comics announced that it had licensed the manga and would compile it in omnibus format, subsequently publishing it on December 9, 2014. In April 2012, Kon's widow Kyōko announced that Opus would be sold in French, Italian, and Korean. The manga has been released in France by Éditions IMHO, in Italy by Panini Comics, in Korea by Daewon C.I., in Germany by Carlsen Comics, and in Spain by Planeta de Libros.

== Adaptation interest ==
At Japan Expo 2017, producer Masao Maruyama of Studio M2 expressed an unofficial wish to produce an anime adaptation of the manga with his studio. Susumu Hirasawa, a composer who frequently worked on Kon's films, stated on Twitter in October 2017 that he was asked to work on a theme song for the series. However, it was not clear whether he was referring to Maruyama's desired project, as no announcements have been made for an anime adaptation of Opus.

== Reception ==
MangaBlog's Brigid Alverson found the action hard to follow which pulled her out of the story, while Katherine Dacey said that she "normally find[s] these kind of meta-exercises tedious, but Kon infuses the story with a sense of playful urgency that thwarts the urge to deconstruct every page." The Fandom Post complimented Kon's use of metafiction as part of a story "rife with questions of existentialism and predestination". Paul Gravett listed it number one on his top ten manga of 2014 and called Opus a "mind-blowing meta-manga" that is "overflowing with ideas and imagination", adding that it shares much in common with Kon's films and would have made a good anime adaption. The Comics Journal said that the plot is "as 'Satoshi Kon' a scenario as can possibly be imagined" and noted the goal of the title in "reaching for the stars".

The French edition of the manga won the 2013 Asia Critics Prize from the Association des Critiques et des journalistes de Bande Dessinée and was part of the Sélection Officiele at the 2014 Angoulême International Comics Festival. It was also on the 2016 Young Adult Library Services Association's Great Graphic Novels for Teens List.

== See also ==
- Comix Zone – a 1995 video game in which an artist is trapped in his own comic
