= Keiko Nobumoto =

Japanese screenwriter (1964–2021)

- Keiko Nobumoto at 2018 New York Comic Con
- Born: 13 March 1964; Hokkaidō, Japan
- Died: 1 December 2021 (aged 57)
- Occupation: Screenwriter
- Known for: Cowboy Bebop; Wolf's Rain

Keiko Nobumoto (信本敬子, Nobumoto Keiko; 13 March 1964 – 1 December 2021) was a Japanese screenwriter. She wrote the screenplay for Cowboy Bebop and created Wolf's Rain.

Nobumoto died due to esophageal cancer on 1 December 2021, at the age of 57. She was posthumously credited for concept contributions during the early production phase of Lazarus, in addition to having the work dedicated to her.

== Filmography ==
Note: Series head writer is denoted in bold

=== Anime television series ===
- Hiroshima ni Ichiban Densha ga Hashita (1993)
- **Cowboy Bebop** (1998–99)
- **Wolf's Rain** (2003)
- Samurai Champloo (2004)
- Space Dandy (2014)
- Carole & Tuesday (2019)
- Lazarus (2024) (story and character advisor; posthumous release)

=== Live television series ===
- Yonimo kimyô na monogatari (1990)

=== Anime films ===
- Tobé! Kujira no Peek (1991)
- Cowboy Bebop: The Movie (2001)
- Tokyo Godfathers (2003)

=== Live action films ===
- World Apartment Horror (1991)

=== OVAs ===
- Macross Plus (1994–95)
- Wolf's Rain (2004)

== Television films ==
- Bakkenrekodo wo Koete (Fuji TV / 2013)

== Video games ==
- Kingdom Hearts (scenario supervisor)
- Kingdom Hearts II (special thanks)
