= Tokyo Godfathers =

2003 anime film by Satoshi Kon

- Theatrical release poster
- Directed by: Satoshi Kon
- Screenplay by: Keiko Nobumoto; Satoshi Kon
- Story by: Satoshi Kon
- Produced by: Shinichi Kobayashi; Masao Takiyama; Taro Maki
- Starring: Tōru Emori; Yoshiaki Umegaki; Aya Okamoto
- Cinematography: Katsutoshi Sugai
- Edited by: Takeshi Seyama; Kashiko Kimura
- Music by: Keiichi Suzuki; Moonriders
- Production company: Madhouse
- Distributed by: Sony Pictures Entertainment Japan
- Release dates: August 30, 2003 (Big Apple Anime Fest); November 8, 2003 (Japan)
- Running time: 92 minutes
- Country: Japan
- Language: Japanese
- Budget: $2.4 million
- Box office: $847,106

Tokyo Godfathers (Japanese: 東京ゴッドファーザーズ, Hepburn: Tōkyō Goddofāzāzu) is a 2003 Japanese animated Christmas tragicomedy adventure film written and directed by Satoshi Kon. The film stars live-action actors such as Toru Emori, Yoshiaki Umegaki, and Aya Okamoto as the lead voice actors.

Kon was inspired by the 1948 American film 3 Godfathers to make the film. Unlike Kon's other films, Tokyo Godfathers is grounded more in realism. However, as is typical of Kon's work, the film includes devices that are not straightforward, and Kon himself called it a twisted sentimental story.

Tokyo Godfathers was released in Japan on November 8, 2003, by Sony Pictures Entertainment Japan and in the United States on January 16, 2004, by Samuel Goldwyn Films and Destination Films. It won the Excellence Award at the 2003 Japan Media Arts Festival and Best Animation Film at the 58th Mainichi Film Awards.

== Plot ==
One Christmas Eve, three homeless people—middle-aged alcoholic Gin, transgender woman Hana, and teenage runaway Miyuki—discover an abandoned newborn while searching through the garbage, along with a note asking whoever finds the baby to take good care of her and a key leading to a locker containing a bag holding clues to the parents' identity. The trio sets out to find the baby's parents, and Hana names her Kiyoko, after the Japanese title of "Silent Night," meaning "pure child".

Outside a cemetery, the group encounters a yakuza boss trapped under his car. After they rescue him, he gives them his business card and tells them to call if they need anything. He then invites them to the wedding of his daughter, who is marrying the owner of the club where Kiyoko's mother used to work. At the reception, the groom tells them that Kiyoko's mother is a former bar girl named Sachiko. He gives them Sachiko's address, but the reception is interrupted when a Latino hitman arrives and attempts to shoot the bride's father before kidnapping Miyuki and Kiyoko.

At the hitman's home, Miyuki befriends his wife despite their language barrier. As they talk, Miyuki confesses to fleeing her home after stabbing her controlling father when her beloved cat, Angel, went missing, believing that he had gotten rid of it.

While Hana searches for Miyuki and Kiyoko, Gin takes care of an elderly homeless man who is dying in the street. After Gin helps the man into his shelter and he gives Gin a little red bag, the man dies peacefully. A group of teenagers arrive and beat up Gin and the man's corpse.

Meanwhile, Hana locates the girls. Looking for a place to stay, they go to Angel Tower, a club Hana had worked at before assaulting a rude and intoxicated customer years earlier. There they find Gin, who was rescued by another employee of the club. Hana confides that she became homeless following her lover's accidental death. The trio later discover that Sachiko's house has been torn down and that her marriage to her alcoholic gambler husband was on the rocks. Miyuki sees a message from her father in the newspaper proclaiming that Angel has returned home. Realizing her mistake, Miyuki attempts to call her father, only to panic and hang up before she can say a word. The group rests at a convenience store until they are told to leave by the clerk.

Hana collapses, and Gin and Miyuki take her to the hospital, where they spend the last of their money to treat her. There, Gin finds his estranged daughter, who is also named Kiyoko and who he had earlier claimed had died of illness, working as a nurse. Hana berates Gin in front of his daughter for abandoning his family and storms out of the hospital, with Miyuki and baby Kiyoko following. Hana and Miyuki come across a woman about to attempt suicide by jumping from a bridge and stop her, and then realize that she is Sachiko. Sachiko insists that her husband got rid of the baby without her knowledge, and Hana and Miyuki return the baby to her.

Gin finds Sachiko's husband, who confirms that Kiyoko is not their child and was stolen by Sachiko from the hospital. Miyuki chases Sachiko to the top of a building. Sachiko reveals she became pregnant in the hopes it would bring her closer to her husband; when her baby was stillborn, she kidnapped Kiyoko from the hospital, thinking in her grief that Kiyoko was hers. Sachiko jumps off the building; Miyuki catches her before she falls, but Kiyoko is dropped. Hana jumps after her, catching her and clinging to a banner on the side of the building. As the banner begins to give way, a gust of wind miraculously slows its descent, allowing Hana and Kiyoko to land safely on the ground. During their reunion, Miyuki drops the old man's red bag on the floor, revealing a winning lottery jackpot ticket. Back at the hospital, Kiyoko's real parents thank the trio for returning their daughter and ask them to become her godparents. When a police inspector introduces them, he is revealed to be Miyuki's father.

== Voice cast ==
Tokyo Godfathers cast
Character	Japanese	English	
Character	Japanese	Animax / Red Angel Media	GKIDS / NYAV Post (2019)
Gin	Tooru Emori	Darren Pleavin	Jon Avner
Hana	Yoshiaki Umegaki	Russell Wait	Shakina Nayfack
Miyuki	Aya Okamoto	Candice Moore	Victoria Grace
Oota	Shouzou Iizuka		Jamieson Price
Mother	Seizou Katou		Kate Bornstein
Yasuo	Hiroya Ishimaru		Kirk Thornton
Homeless man	Ryuuji Saikachi		David Manis
Ishida	Yuusaku Yara		Crispin Freeman
Sachiko	Kyouko Terase		Larissa Gallagher
Gin's daughter Kiyoko	Mamiko Noto		Erica Schroeder
Doctor	Akio Ootsuka		Jamieson Price
Arao	Rikiya Koyama		Michael Sinterniklaas
Kiyoko	Satomi Koorogi		Kari Wahlgren
Kurumizawa	Inuko Inuyama		Philece Sampler
Cat lady	Rie Shibata		Erica Schroeder
Taxi driver	Kouichi Yamadera		Marc Thompson
Yamanouchi	Kanako Yahara		Philece Sampler

=== Additional voices ===
Japanese: Akiko Kawase, Akiko Takeguchi, Atsuko Yuya, Bin Horikawa, Chiyako Shibahara, Eriko Kawasaki, Hidenari Umezu, Kazuaki Itou, Masao Harada, Mitsuru Ogata, Nobuyuki Furuta, Toshitaka Shimizu, Tsuguo Mogami, Yoshinori Sonobe, Yuuto Kazama, Luis Sartor, Myrta Delgado

English (GKIDS): Crispin Freeman, David Manis, Erica Schroeder, Jaden Waldman, Jamieson Price, Jordan Cole, Kirk Thornton, Lexie Foley, Gloria Garayua, Marc Thompson, Michael Sinterniklaas, Orlando Rios, Philece Sampler

== Production ==
During the production of Millennium Actress, a producer from Madhouse asked Kon if he had any plans for his next film. After completing the film, Kon took two months to write and submit a brief proposal, which was immediately accepted by Madhouse.

The original story and screenplay were written by director Satoshi Kon, and co-written by Keiko Nobumoto, known as the screenwriter of the TV drama series Hakusen Nagashi and the TV anime Cowboy Bebop, and the creator of the TV anime Wolf's Rain. Kon had previously asked Nobumoto to write the script for Perfect Blue, but she turned him down, citing her busy schedule. The animation director was Ken'ichi Konishi, who had worked on My Neighbors the Yamadas while at Studio Ghibli, and the Studio director was Shōgo Furuya.

While the previous two works focused on the progression of the story, this work prioritized the theatricality of the characters and their presence above all else in both the scenario and storyboarding. Although the story and theatrics are quite comical in appearance, the film was created not to return to the old-fashioned manga interpretation, but to aim for a manga interpretation that lies ahead after going through real-oriented animation.

The film was produced in digital technology, and all of Kon's subsequent works are digital animation.

== Themes ==
The motif of Tokyo Godfathers is "coincidence" and "family", and the rough plot is about "three main characters who are not related by blood but live together as if they were a real family, and through a miraculous coincidence triggered by a baby, each of them recovers the connection with their original family that they have lost".

Tokyo Godfathers does not adopt an overt "mixing of fiction and reality" motif, but a careful look reveals a concern with the relationship between "fiction and reality". What Kon was conscious of in his direction was "meaningful coincidence", in other words, to create a chain of miraculous events to move the story forward. Kon writes in the press sheet, "This film is an attempt to restore in a healthy way the 'miracles and coincidences' that have been pushed into the other world by the weapons of scientific logic," and just as that sentence says, "meaningful coincidences" and "impossible events" happen one after another in Tokyo Godfathers . In other words, the idea of this film is that the "fiction" of "miracles and coincidences" can be found in the seemingly real life of the homeless in Tokyo. The director's aim is to portray a series of events that could never happen in reality with a sense of reality and persuasiveness that makes it seem possible.

Kon said: "Homeless people, as the term implies, 'have no home,' but in this film, it is not just 'people who have lost their homes,' but also 'people who have lost their families,' and in that sense, this film is a story about recovering lost relationships with families." Kon chose homeless people as his protagonists because he had long been interested in the lives of homeless people. One of the triggers for Kon to come up with Tokyo Godfathers was the idea that they are born even in times of affluence, and at the same time, they are supported because the world is affluent, so they may be said to be kept alive by the city. The other idea was the idea of animism in the city, that even the buildings and alleys of the city may have a soul, and that the main characters step into the other world that overlaps the city. Based on a story in which three homeless people living as a family pick up a baby and try to return it to her parents, Kon imagined a story in which the trio enter a "different world" where strange coincidences occur in succession, and they recover their relationship with their families and society through their adventures, while another protagonist named "Tokyo" is watching over them. In fact, "landscapes that look like faces", in which the outdoor units of air conditioners and windows are used as eyes and mouths, are embedded in various cuts, which could be said to be the figures of the gods of the city staring at the main characters. These "faces" are not visible from the perspective of the characters, and only the audience can notice them. Kon has also created a fiction here. The film's background is a trick of overlapping two layers of information: "the city scenery = reality for the characters" and "the scenery with faces that only the audience can see = a kind of fiction", even though it is the same single picture.

The three main characters, who are not related by blood, look like a family. The film does not offer them as a "new image of the family in the future", but simply suggests that a family with this kind of relationship might be acceptable. Kon's idea was to suggest that it is necessary to find a way for each person to have their own family, rather than a standardized model of what a new family should look like. Kon said that he did not intend to portray homeless people as representatives of weakness and unhappiness, or as a hindrance to society, and that the three are symbols of everyone's weaknesses and regrets rather than real homeless people. He also said they are unhappy not because they are homeless, but because their lives have lost their former glow, and that happiness lies in the process of recovery, which is the story of this work itself.

== Release ==
This movie was released in North America by Sony Pictures on December 29, 2003, in an unsuccessful attempt to get an Academy Award nomination for Best Animated Feature. The movie was released on sub-only DVD on April 13, 2004, and they planned to use DTS for the DVD, but the plan was ultimately scrapped. Announced on December 19, 2019, international animation licensor, GKIDS, in partnership with the original US distributor Destination Films, released the movie on March 9, 2020, with a brand new 4K restoration and a new English dub.

== Reception ==
On the review aggregator website Rotten Tomatoes, the film holds an approval rating of 92% based on 76 reviews, with an average rating of 7.3/10. The website's critics' consensus reads, "Beautiful and substantive, 'Tokyo Godfathers' adds a moving – and somewhat unconventional – entry to the animated Christmas canon." Metacritic, which uses a weighted average, assigned the film a score of 75 out of 100, based on 25 critics, indicating "generally favorable" reviews. Roger Ebert gave the film three stars out of four, calling it "harrowing and heartwarming".

Susan Napier points out that Tokyo Godfathers is part of a trend in anime and manga that depicts families in an increasingly dark fashion, showcasing problems with traditional families, and attempts by people to construct a "pseudo-family" in response to an increasingly fragmented and isolating modern Japanese society. Despite its seemingly traditional ending, the film offers a more radical version of family. Throughout the story these three homeless vagabonds unknowingly form a "pseudo-family" to protect themselves from the outside world and to overcome their personal demons.

== See also ==
- Homelessness in Japan
- Japanese films of 2003
- List of Christmas films
