= List of animated television series of 2004 =

A list of animated television series first aired in 2004.

Animated television series first aired in 2004
Title	Seasons	Episodes	Country	Year	Original Channel	Technique
1 minute au musée	2	100	France	2004	Eurêka!	Flash
6teen	4	93	Canada	2004–10	Teletoon	Flash
Adventurers: Masters of Time	1	26	Germany; United Kingdom	2004	Disney Channel	Traditional
The Adventures in Nutrition with Captain Carlos	1	20	United States	2004–06	Playhouse Disney	Flash
The Adventures of Massey Ferguson	1	26	New Zealand	2004	TVNZ	CGI
Anna's Tales	2	52	Italy	2004	RaiSat Ragazzi; Rai Tre; Rai Gulp; Rai Yoyo	Flash
Aqua Kids	1	26	Japan; South Korea	2004	TV Tokyo; SBS	CGI
Atomic Betty	3	79	Canada; France	2004–08	Teletoon; M6 (seasons 1–2); Télétoon (season 3)	Flash
The Backyardigans	4	80	United States; Canada	2004–13	Nickelodeon; Treehouse TV	CGI
The Batman	5	65	United States	2004–08	Kids' WB; Cartoon Network (2004–06)	Traditional
Bibi and Tina	6	62	Germany	2004–23	ZDF	Traditional
Big Ear Tutu	5	130	China	2004	CCTV-14	Traditional
Björn Bear	1	39	Germany; Hungary; Sweden	2004		Traditional
The Blue Dragon	1	13	United Kingdom	2004	Channel 4	Flash
Bongo		26	India	2004–06	DD National	CGI/Live action
The Book of Colors	1	24	Israel	2004	Hop! Channel	Flash
The Boy	2	26	Canada	2004–05	YTV	Traditional
Brandy & Mr. Whiskers	2	39	United States	2004–06	Disney Channel	Traditional
Bro'Town	5	32	New Zealand	2004–09	TV3	Traditional
Bumper King Zapper	1	26	South Korea	2004	SBS	CGI
Cartoon Alley	3	67	United States	2004–07	Turner Classic Movies	Traditional
Clarita	2	34	Chile	2004–05	TVN	Flash
CO2	3	101	France	2004–09	MCM	
Creepschool	1	26	France; Canada; Sweden; Germany; China; Luxembourg	2004	France 3/Canal J ZDF/EM.TV; Teletoon/Télétoon	Traditional
Da Boom Crew	1	13	Canada; Germany; United States	2004	The WB (episodes 1–4); Cartoon Network	Traditional
Danny Phantom	3	53	United States	2004–07	Nickelodeon	Traditional
Danpite Khadu Aar Tar Chemical Dadu	1	11	India	2004	DD Bangla	Flash
Dark Oracle	2	26	Canada	2004–06	YTV	Traditional/Live-action
Dave the Barbarian	1	21	United States	2004–05	Disney Channel	Traditional
Decisive Battles	1	13	United States	2004	History Channel	CGI
Delta State	1	26	Canada; France; Luxembourg; India	2004–05	The Detour On Teletoon; France 2 Canal+	Traditional
Dragon	3	78	Canada; Germany; South Korea	2004–07	Treehouse TV; ZDF; EBS	Stop motion
Dragon Booster	3	39	Germany; Canada	2004–06	CBC Television; ABC Family	CGI
Dragon's Rock	1	26	Germany; Ireland	2004–06	Super RTL	CGI
Drawn Together	3	36	United States	2004–07	Comedy Central	Traditional
The Eggs	4	52	Australia; Canada	2004–05	Nine Network	Flash
Emily's World	1	13	Singapore	2004	Kids Central	Flash
Empire Square	1	12	United Kingdom	2004–06	Channel 4	Flash
Et Dieu créa... Laflaque	1	439	Canada	2004–19	Ici Radio-Canada Télé	CGI
Farzzle's World	1	26	Canada	2004	Treehouse TV	Flash
Father of the Pride	1	14	United States	2004–05	NBC	CGI
Fatherhood	2	26	United States	2004–05	Nick at Nite	Flash
Flatmania	4	52	France; Canada	2004	France 3 YTV	Flash/CGI
Foster's Home for Imaginary Friends	6	79	United States	2004–09	Cartoon Network	Flash
Funky Valley	2	52	United Kingdom	2004–07	Five	Flash
Game Over	1	6	United States	2004	UPN	CGI
Go, Baby!	1	8	United States	2004–06	Playhouse Disney	Flash
The Gnoufs	4	52	France	2004–07	France 3	CGI
Happy Family	2	140	China	2004		Flash
Hi Hi Puffy AmiYumi	3	39	United States; Japan	2004–06	Cartoon Network	Flash/Live action
Higglytown Heroes	3	65	United States	2004–08	Playhouse Disney	CGI
I-Pop	1	12	Chile	2004	Canal 13	Flash
I Am Not an Animal	1	6	United Kingdom	2004	BBC Two	Flash
J Bole Toh Jadoo			India	2004–05	Nickelodeon	CGI/Live-action
Johan: The Young Scientist	1	26	Canada; Malaysia	2004	CBC Television	Flash
Jungle Tales			India	2004	Cartoon Network	CGI
Just Jamie	1	13	Canada; United Kingdom	2004	YTV	Flash
Justice League Unlimited	3	39	United States	2004–06	Cartoon Network	Traditional
Kacang	5	28	Malaysia	2004–19	TV1; TV2; TV Okey; Astro Ceria	CGI
KidsWorld Sports	1	26	Canada; France	2004–05	BBC Kids; Eurêka! Discovery Kids	Live action/Flash
Kikoriki		273	Russia	2004–present	Russia 1	Flash (seasons 1–4); CGI (season 3)
Lazy Lucy	1	52	France; Germany	2004–05	France 5 TiJi; KI.KA	Traditional
Leader Dog	1	13	United States	2004	Nicktoons Network	Flash
Lilly the Witch	3	52	Germany; United Kingdom; Canada	2004–14	TVOntario; KI.KA	Traditional (season 1–2); Flash (season 3)
Little Red Tractor	3	75	United Kingdom	2004–07	CBeebies	Stop motion
M.K. 22	1	10	Israel	2004	Bip	CGI/Flash
Marias kleiner Esel	1	4	Germany	2004	Das Erste	Traditional
Maya & Miguel	5	65	United States	2004–07	PBS Kids Go!	Traditional
Megas XLR	2	26	United States	2004–05	Cartoon Network	Traditional
Miss Spider's Sunny Patch Friends	3	44	Canada; United Kingdom	2004–09	Teletoon (series 1–2); Treehouse TV (series 3); Five	CGI
Nalong	1	52	South Korea	2004–06	MBC	Traditional
Nicktoons Film Festival	6	114	United States	2004–09	Nicktoons Network	Traditional/Stop motion/CGI/Flash/Live action
The Nimbols	1	26	Germany	2004–06	Super RTL	CGI
O'Grady	2	19	United States	2004–06	The N	Flash
PangPond the Insect World Adventure	1	8	Thailand	2004	Channel 3	CGI
Pat & Stan	3	39	France; Germany	2004–10	TF1	CGI
Peep and the Big Wide World	5	60	Canada; United States	2004–11	TVOntario; Discovery Kids/TLC (seasons 1–3); PBS Kids (seasons 4–5)	Flash
Pencilmation	34	721	United States	2004–23	Newgrounds; YouTube	Traditional/Flash
Peppa Pig	9	459	United Kingdom	2004–present	Five/Channel 5 Nick Jr.	Flash
Perfect Hair Forever	3	9	United States	2004–14	Adult Swim	Flash
El Perro y el Gato	1	5	United States	2004–11	HBO Family; HBO Latino	Flash
Pet Alien	2	52	United States; France; Ireland; India (season 1); Germany (season 2)	2004–07	TF1/Télétoon; Cartoon Network/Animania HD	CGI
Petit Vampire	1	52	France	2004	France 3	Flash
Peter Swift and the Little Circus	1	26	France	2004	TF1	Traditional
Pic Me		104	Ireland	2004	RTÉ2	Flash
Pigeon Boy	1	26	France	2004	France 3	Traditional
Piratengeschichten	2	26	Germany	2004–06	KI.KA	Stop motion
Pondorondo	4	52	Germany	2004–07	KI.KA	Stop motion
Postcards from Buster	4	55	United States	2004–12	PBS Kids Go!	Traditional/Live action
Potatoes and Dragons	1	26	Canada; France; Germany; India; Luxembourg	2004	Canal J France 3 Teletoon	Traditional
Princess Natasha	5	44	United States	2004–07	AOL Kids; Cartoon Network	Flash
Salad Fingers	1	12	United Kingdom	2004–present	YouTube; Newgrounds	Flash
Santo vs The Clones	1	5	Mexico	2004	Cartoon Network	Traditional
Seaside Hotel	1	26	France; Australia	2004	TF1	Traditional
Shadow of the Elves	1	26	Germany; United Kingdom	2004	Super RTL	Traditional
Shorties Watchin' Shorties	1	13	United States	2004	Comedy Central	Flash
The Spooky Sisters	1	12	United Kingdom	2004	Disney Channel	Flash/CGI
The Strangerhood	2	21	United States	2004–15	RoosterTeeth.com	CGI
Stroker & Hoop	1	13	United States	2004–05	Adult Swim	Flash
Super Billy	4	53	Bosnia and Herzegovina	2004–07	BHT1	
The Super Popular Show!			Canada	2004	CHEX-DT	Flash/Live action
Super Robot Monkey Team Hyperforce Go!	4	52	United States; Japan	2004–06	Toon Disney; ABC Family	Traditional
This Just In!	1	6	United States	2004	Spike	Flash
Time Cracks	1	26	Australia	2004	ABC	CGI
ToddWorld	2	39	United States; Ireland; India	2004–08	TLC; Discovery Kids	Flash
The Tofus	2	26	France; Canada	2004–05	Jetix; France 3 Teletoon	Traditional
Tom	2	39	Spain; France; United Kingdom; Germany	2004	TVE2; CBBC; France 3 ZDF	Traditional
Tom Goes to the Mayor	2	30	United States	2004–06	Adult Swim	Stop motion
Tortellini Western	1	13	United States	2004	Nicktoons Network	Flash
Tripping the Rift	3	39	United States; Canada	2004–07	Sci Fi Channel; Space; Teletoon (series 3)	CGI
Trotro	2	78	France	2004–05	France 5	Flash
Un Jour Un Drapeau	1	51	France	2004	Eurêka!	
The Venture Bros.	7	81	United States	2004–18	Adult Swim	Traditional
Video Mods	2	6	United States	2004–05	MTV2	CGI
Villa Dulce	2	26	Chile	2004–05	Canal 13; UCV Televisión	Flash
W.I.T.C.H.	2	52	France; United States	2004–06	France 3 ABC Family	Traditional
Winx Club	8	208	Italy; United States (seasons 5–7)	2004–19	RAI channels Nickelodeon	Traditional (original series); Flash/CGI (revival series)
Woofy	1	65	France; Canada	2004–05	France 5 Télévision de Radio-Canada	Traditional
Xmas Xpress	2	26	Germany	2004–05	KI.KA	Flash/Live action
Zeroman	1	13	Canada	2004	Teletoon	Traditional
Zixx	3	39	Canada	2004–09	YTV	CGI; Live action
Zlikavci	2	54	Croatia	2004–06	HRT1 (2004); HRT2 (2005)	Flash
Zoé Kézako	2	52	France	2004	TF1	CGI
Cartum Netiuorque	2	21	Brazil	2004-2006	Adult Swim	Traditional

Anime television series first aired in 2004
Title	Seasons	Episodes	Country	Year	Original Channel	Technique
Agatha Christie's Great Detectives Poirot and Marple	1	39	Japan	2004–05	NHK	Traditional
Aishiteruze Baby	1	26	Japan	2004		Traditional
AM Driver	1	51	Japan	2004–05		Traditional
Area 88	1	12	Japan	2004		Traditional
Battle B-Daman	1	52	Japan	2004		Traditional
Beck: Mongolian Chop Squad	1	26	Japan	2004–05		Traditional
Beet the Vandel Buster	1	52	Japan	2004–05		Traditional
Black Jack	1	61	Japan	2004–06		Traditional
Bleach	16	366	Japan	2004–12		Traditional
Burn-Up Scramble	1	12	Japan	2004		Traditional
Burst Angel	1	24	Japan	2004		Traditional
The Cosmopolitan Prayers	1	8	Japan	2004		Traditional
Dan Doh!!	1	26	Japan	2004		Traditional
Daphne in the Brilliant Blue	1	24	Japan	2004		Traditional
DearS	1	12	Japan	2004		Traditional
Desert Punk	1	24	Japan	2004–05		Traditional
Diamond Daydreams	1	12	Japan	2004		Traditional
Dogtato	1	26	Japan	2004		
Doki Doki School Hours	1	13	Japan	2004		Traditional
Duel Masters: Charge	1	52	Japan	2004–06		Traditional
Elfen Lied	1	13	Japan	2004		Traditional
Fafner in the Azure	1	26	Japan	2004		Traditional
Fantastic Children	1	26	Japan	2004–05		Traditional
Final Approach	1	13	Japan	2004		Traditional
Futakoi	1	13	Japan	2004		Traditional
Futari wa Pretty Cure	1	49	Japan	2004–05		Traditional
Gakuen Alice	1	26	Japan	2004–05		Traditional
Galaxy Angel X	1	13	Japan	2004		Traditional
Gankutsuou: The Count of Monte Cristo	1	24	Japan	2004–05		Traditional
Gantz	2	26	Japan	2004		Traditional
Genshiken	1	12	Japan	2004		Traditional
Ghost in the Shell: S.A.C. 2nd GIG	1	26	Japan	2004–05		Traditional
Girls Bravo	2	24	Japan	2004–05		Traditional
Gokusen	1	13	Japan	2004		Traditional
Grandpa Danger	1	51	Japan	2004–05		Traditional
Gravion Zwei	1	12	Japan	2004		Traditional
Grenadier	1	12	Japan	2004–05		Traditional
Hanaukyo Maid Team: La Verite	1	12	Japan	2004		Traditional
Haruka: Beyond the Stream of Time: A Tale of the Eight Guardians	1	26	Japan	2004–05		Traditional
Initial D: Fourth Stage	1	24	Japan	2004–06		Traditional
Jubei-chan 2: The Counter Attack of Siberia Yagyu	1	13	Japan	2004		Traditional
Kaiketsu Zorori	1	52	Japan	2004–05		Traditional
Kakyūsei 2	1	13	Japan	2004		Traditional
Kannazuki no Miko	1	12	Japan	2004		Traditional
Kappa no Kaikata	1	26	Japan	2004–05		Traditional
Kimagure Robot	1	10	Japan	2004		Traditional
Koi Kaze	1	13	Japan	2004		Traditional
Kurau Phantom Memory	1	24	Japan	2004		Traditional
Kyo Kara Maoh!	2	78	Japan	2004–06		Traditional
Legend of DUO	1	12	Japan	2004–05		Traditional
Legendz: Tale of the Dragon Kings	1	50	Japan	2004–05		Traditional
Love Love?	1	9	Japan	2004		Traditional
Madlax	1	26	Japan	2004		Traditional
Magical Girl Lyrical Nanoha	1	13	Japan	2004		Traditional
Major	6	154	Japan	2004–10		Traditional
Maria-sama ga Miteru	1	13	Japan	2004		Traditional
Maria-sama ga Miteru: Printemps	1	13	Japan	2004		Traditional
Mars Daybreak	1	26	Japan	2004		Traditional
The Marshmallow Times	1	52	Japan	2004–05		Traditional
MegaMan NT Warrior Stream	1	51	Japan	2004–05		Traditional
Meine Liebe	1	13	Japan	2004–05		Traditional
Melody of Oblivion	1	24	Japan	2004		Traditional
Mermaid Melody Pichi Pichi Pitch Pure	1	39	Japan	2004		Traditional
Mezzo DSA	1	13	Japan	2004		Traditional
Midori Days	1	13	Japan	2004		Traditional
Misaki Chronicles	1	13	Japan	2004		Traditional
Mobile Suit Gundam SEED Destiny	1	50	Japan	2004–05		Traditional
Monkey Turn	1	25	Japan	2004		Traditional
Monkey Turn V	1	25	Japan	2004		Traditional
Monster	1	74	Japan	2004–05		Traditional
Musumet	1	13	Japan	2004		Traditional
My-HiME	1	26	Japan	2004–05		Traditional
Nanami-chan	6	92	Japan	2004–09		Traditional
Ninja Nonsense	1	12	Japan	2004		Traditional
Onmyō Taisenki	1	52	Japan	2004–05		Traditional
Otogi Zoshi	1	26	Japan	2004–05		Traditional
Panda-Z	1	30	Japan	2004		
Paranoia Agent	1	13	Japan	2004		Traditional
Phoenix	1	13	Japan	2004		Traditional
Pugyuru	1	13	Japan	2004		Traditional
Ragnarok the Animation	1	26	Japan; South Korea	2004		Traditional
Ring ni Kakero 1	1	12	Japan	2004		Traditional
Rozen Maiden	1	12	Japan	2004		Traditional
Saiyuki Reload Gunlock	1	26	Japan	2004		Traditional
Samurai 7	1	26	Japan	2004		Traditional
Samurai Champloo	1	26	Japan	2004–05		Traditional
Samurai Gun	1	12	Japan	2004		Traditional
School Rumble	1	26	Japan	2004–05		Traditional
Sgt. Frog	7	358	Japan	2004–11		Traditional
Shura no Mon	1	26	Japan	2004		Traditional
Space Symphony Maetel	1	13	Japan	2004	Animax	Traditional
Sweet Valerian	1	26	Japan	2004		Traditional
Tactics	1	25	Japan	2004–05		Traditional
Tenjho Tenge	1	24	Japan	2004		Traditional
Tetsujin 28-go	1	26	Japan	2004		Traditional
This Ugly yet Beautiful World	1	12	Japan	2004		Traditional
To Heart: Remember My Memories	1	13	Japan	2004		Traditional
Transformers: Energon	1	52	Japan	2004		CGI/Traditional
Tsuki wa Higashi ni Hi wa Nishi ni: Operation Sanctuary	1	13	Japan	2004		Traditional
Tsukuyomi: Moon Phase	1	25	Japan	2004–05		Traditional
Tweeny Witches	1	40	Japan	2004–05		Traditional
Uta Kata	1	12	Japan	2004		Traditional
Viewtiful Joe	1	51	Japan	2004–05		Traditional
W Wish	1	13	Japan	2004		Traditional
Wind: A Breath of Heart	1	13	Japan	2004		Traditional
Windy Tales	1	13	Japan	2004–05		Traditional
Yakitate!! Japan	1	69	Japan	2004–06		Traditional
Yu-Gi-Oh! GX	4	180	Japan	2004–08	TV Tokyo	Traditional
Yugo the Negotiator	1	13	Japan	2004		Traditional
Yumeria	1	12	Japan	2004		Traditional
Zipang	1	26	Japan	2004–05		Traditional

== See also ==
- List of animated feature films of 2004
- List of Japanese animation television series of 2004
