= List of Space Symphony Maetel episodes =

This article is a list of episodes from Space Symphony Maetel: Galaxy Express 999 Side Story, an anime OVA series created by Leiji Matsumoto. The OVA series was first aired in Japan from 6 August to 29 October 2004 on the Animax PPV Premier channel on the SkyPerfecTV satellite system in Japan. The series was created in order to bridge the gap between Galaxy Express 999 (1977) and Maetel Legend (2000) and was subsequently released on DVD.

The opening theme song was "Everlasting Dream" by Taro Hakase, and the ending theme was "Galaxy Legend" by Takako Uehara.

== Episode list ==
No.	Title	Original release date
1	"Departure of Fate"; Transliteration: ""Unmei" no Tabidachi" (Japanese: "運命"の旅立ち)	6 August 2004
2	"Nazca's Passion"; Transliteration: "Nasuka no "Netsujō"" (Japanese: ナスカの"熱情")	13 August 2004
3	"The Night Before the Revolution"; Transliteration: ""Kakumei" Zen-ya" (Japanese: "革命"前夜)	20 August 2004
4	"Rhapsody in Gold"; Transliteration: "Kogane-Iro no "Rapusodī"" (Japanese: 黄金色の"ラプソディ")	27 August 2004
5	"Promethium's Magic Flute"; Transliteration: "Puromeshumu no "Mateki"" (Japanese: プロメシュームの"魔笛")	3 September 2004
6	"Larela's Requiem"; Transliteration: "Rārera no "Rekuiemu"" (Japanese: ラーレラの"レクイエム")	10 September 2004
7	"The Way to My Homeland"; Transliteration: ""Waga Sokoku" he no Michi" (Japanese: "わが祖国"への道)	17 September 2004
8	"A Funeral March for Mother"; Transliteration: "Haha e no "Sōsō Kōshinkyoku"" (Japanese: 母への"葬送行進曲")	24 September 2004
9	"La-Metal's Spring"; Transliteration: "Rāmetaru no "Haru"" (Japanese: ラーメタルの"春")	1 October 2004
10	"Lightning Strikes the Titan"; Transliteration: "Denkou no "Kyojin"" (Japanese: 電光の"巨人")	8 October 2004
11	"Hero Leopard"; Transliteration: ""Eiyū" Leopard" (Japanese: "英雄"レオパルド)	15 October 2004
12	"Song of the Wayfarer for the Heroes"; Transliteration: "Yūshi-Tachi no "Wakare no Uta"" (Japanese: 勇士たちの"別れの曲")	22 October 2004
13	"The Far Away New World"; Transliteration: "Haruka naru "Shin-Sekai"" (Japanese: 遥かなる"新世界")	29 October 2004
