= List of Burst Angel episodes =

This is a list of episodes from the anime Burst Angel.

No.	Title	Original release date	English air date
1	"Hell Comes Silently" (Japanese: 地獄が静かにやって来る)	6 April 2004	1 December 2008
Kyohei, a culinary student, takes a mysterious job working for four women: Sei, Meg, Amy, and Jo. They are a special taskforce, and when one of their jobs goes awry, Kyohei is kidnapped.
2	"The Heartless Gunfighter"; Transliteration: "The Coldhearted Gunfighter" (Japanese: 情無用のガン・ファイター)	13 April 2004	2 December 2008
Meg is kidnapped by a cybot, and Jo goes after her, taking Kyohei. They go into the most dangerous part of town and retrieve Meg, along with a piece of the cybot.
3	"City Where the Beast Howls"; Transliteration: "The City Where Beasts Howl" (Japanese: 野獣の吠える街)	20 April 2004	3 December 2008
Kyohei has second thoughts about his new job. The girls go after a lunatic named Anthony Wong, and get involved in a secret experiment along with Wong's brother.
4	"The Brothers Die at Dawn"; Transliteration: "Brothers Die at Dawn" (Japanese: 兄弟 暁に死す)	27 April 2004	4 December 2008
Meg is trapped on a train with Wong and his brother, Jack Liang. Hinode Pharmaceuticals has been performing experiments on Wong, and he turns into a monster. This monster drives the train into a Hinode building, and Jo saves Meg at the last second.
5	"Mansion Where Lurks the Demon"; Transliteration: "The Manor Where the Demon Lurks" (Japanese: 邪神蠢く館)	4 May 2004	5 December 2008
Meg goes undercover at an all-girls school named St. Luciana Academy. She investigates an elite clique called Ishtar, and is attacked by a monster.
6	"Wash this Garden with Blood!"; Transliteration: "Wash this Flower Garden with Blood!" (Japanese: この花園を血で洗え！)	11 May 2004	8 December 2008
The students at the all-girls school have been used as test subjects, turning one girl, called Nadeshiko Volban, into a monster. Jo joins the school and kills the monstrous girl.
7	"Black Sky"; Transliteration: "Black Skies" (Japanese: 黒い空)	18 May 2004	9 December 2008
A giant mechanized crow abducts Meg. It is searching for a deadly nanobot virus that has been injected in Kyohei. Jo takes Kyohei at gunpoint to look for the crow.
8	"The Wounded Outlaw"; Transliteration: "Scarred Fugitives" (Japanese: 傷だらけの逃亡者)	25 May 2004	10 December 2008
Jo and Kyohei are on the run from Sei's underlings, as they search for the crow. Jo and Sei resolve their differences, and Jo defeats the crow using Django in time to save Kyohei.
9	"Party of the Dragon"; Transliteration: "Party of the Dragon" (Japanese: パーティー・オブ・ザ・ドラゴン)	25 May 2004	11 December 2008
Sei agrees to a political marriage for the sake of Bailan, but the groom, Jei, doublecrosses them. Meg's flying white tiger chi is unleashed, and Jei and his men are defeated.
10	"Uncharted Cyberspace"; Transliteration: "Uncharted Cyberspace" (Japanese: 電脳番外地)	8 June 2004	12 December 2008
Someone has been posting pictures of Amy in cyberspace, so she and Kyohei go shopping for electronics. A group of "monitormen" wants her to join them in cyberspace permanently, but she defeats them.
11	"Eastern Angel, Western Hawk"; Transliteration: "Angel of the East, Hawk of the West" (Japanese: 東の天使 西の鷹)	15 June 2004	15 December 2008
Jo is ordered to protect Mega Rider, a Japanese wrestler. Ultra Beast, his opponent, turns into a monster and Jo goes off to kill it.
12	"Tower of Tears"; Transliteration: "Tsutenkaku Tower, Drenched with Tears" (Japanese: 通天閣は涙に濡れて)	22 June 2004	16 December 2008
A cybot attacks Osaka. RAPT is trying to take over the Osaka police, and they have planted a man in the Osaka police. The man captures Meg, as Jo fights the cybot.
13	"Showdown in Osaka"; Transliteration: "Bloody Battle! Naniwa Hoodlums" (Japanese: 血戦！浪速愚連隊)	29 June 2004	17 December 2008
Takane Katsu saves Meg from the dirty cop, Iriki. Then Takane and Jo take down the cybot, extracting its brain and killing Iriki in the process.
14	"Wild Kids"; Transliteration: "Wild Kids" (Japanese: ワイルド・キッズ)	6 July 2004	18 December 2008
A flashback reveals Meg and Jo's history. Meg is the leader of a group of orphans who find Jo in a river with amnesia.
15	"Slingin' Oil"; Transliteration: "An Ocean, Swimsuits, and a Sea Monster" (Japanese: 海と水着と大海獣)	13 July 2004	19 December 2008
The group goes to the beach. A giant squid causes a flaming oil spill, and Jo takes it down with Django.
16	"The Man with No Name"; Transliteration: "War Demon of the Haunted Realm" (Japanese: 魔境戦鬼)	20 July 2004	22 December 2008
Jo goes after a mysterious cybot, and meets a mute samurai. The cybot destroyed a village he was protecting, and he seeks revenge.
17	"Dueling Angels"; Transliteration: "A Clash! The Two Angels" (Japanese: 激突！二人の天使)	27 July 2004	23 December 2008
The cybot is piloted by Maria, a woman with special abilities like Jo. When she and Jo fight, it transports them to another reality. In this reality, the mute samurai defeats the cybot with a magic sword. Sei shows up with Django in the middle of the battle.
18	"The Immortal Classmate"; Transliteration: "Immortal Classmate" (Japanese: 不死身の同級生)	3 August 2004	24 December 2008
Kyohei runs into a friend from school, Akio. Akio has joined the yakuza and become a cyberoid. Akio's boss Eiji has turned on him, and they destroy each other.
19	"24-Hour Strategy"; Transliteration: "24-Hour Plot" (Japanese: 謀略 24時間)	10 August 2004	25 December 2008
Takane and Leo visit the filming of a television drama, when Takane goes berserk then becomes unconscious. A glowing brain is controlling Tokyo's children, including Takane, and sends them after the group. Jo destroys the brain, and everyone returns to normal.
20	"Blood Red Highway"; Transliteration: "Massacre Highway" (Japanese: 皆殺しのハイウェイ)	17 August 2004	26 December 2008
A RAPT police cybot attacks Takane on the freeway. Its glowing brain causes it to attack innocent people. It calls in reinforcements, but Jo and the team destroy them all.
21	"New Sheriff in Town"; Transliteration: "Bullets in the Iron Grave Post" (Japanese: 鉄の墓標に弾丸を)	24 August 2004	29 December 2008
Bailan have joined forces with RAPT. They force Sei to disband the group, then send them on one last mission to kill the mutated governor, Ishihara.
22	"Genocide Angels"; Transliteration: "Beloved Devil" (Japanese: 恋する悪魔)	31 August 2004	30 December 2008
Jo is captured, and her past is revealed. She is a bio-weapon, the same as Maria. They are the two survivors of a death match to choose the best. Maria comes on to Meg, then kidnaps her and Jo. Note: also called "The Devil You Love."
23	"Red Sea Gallows"; Transliteration: "Execution Ground on the Red Seas" (Japanese: 赤い海の処刑場)	7 September 2004	31 December 2008
Maria takes Jo and Meg to a ship in the ocean. Jo and Maria have a duel, and Maria's desire to kill Jo abates. Jo, Meg and Maria are then attacked by RAPT cybots and Maria is seemingly killed.
24	"Angels, Explode!"; Transliteration: "Burst, Angels!" (Japanese: 天使、爆裂！)	14 September 2004	1 January 2009
Jo knocks Meg unconscious for her own safety, and Sei and Jo take down RAPT, with the help of Leo, Takane and Amy. After a long gun battle with RAPT cybots across town, Jo and Sei enter the RAPT HQ and destroy its supercomputer, along with killing the head of RAPT, which leads to the base exploding with them inside. Later on, Meg awakens on the beach and discovers what happened. The story ends with Meg replacing Jo in a scene similar to the entry credits but with a red Django. The fates of Leo, Takane, Kyouhei and Amy are left ambiguous, but it is implied they survived the final battle and fled from Tokyo.
OVA	"Jo and Meg Blues"; Transliteration: "Jo and Meg Blues" (Japanese: ジョウとメグのブルーズ)	TBA	TBA
A side story set before the start of the series. Jo and Meg return to New York City for Shirley's birthday, to find that she has been hospitalised by a mysterious killer and the police won't do anything to find him, so they decide to track him down instead to get revenge for attacking Shirley.
