= Cartum Netiuorque =

- Also known as: Cartum Netiuorqui
- Created by: Daniel Messias
- Based on: Brazilian Comic Strips
- Written by: Carlos Tureta
- No. of episodes: 21

Production
- Animator: Laerte Glauco Caco Galhardo
- Production company: Estúdio Daniel Messias

Original release
- Network: Cartoon Network
- Release: 2004 – 2005
- Network: Adult Swim
- Release: 2006 – 2006

Cartum Netiuorque (or Cartum Netiuorqui) was an animation project produced by Estúdio Daniel Messias and broadcast by Cartoon Network during its nighttime block, Adult Swim. It ran in two separate editions: one between 2004 and 2005, and another in 2006. The project's goal was to invite Brazilian cartoonists to adapt characters from their comic strips and comic books into short animated segments, which were then aired during the channel's commercial breaks.

== Production ==
The event was organized by cartoonist Daniel Messias in 2004, after he brought together several other Brazilian cartoonists to take part in the program, which debuted in 2006.

Among the comic strip series chosen to be animated were Overman by Laerte, Geraldinho by Glauco, and Os Pescoçudos by Caco Galhardo.
