= List of Beck: Mongolian Chop Squad episodes =

Beck: Mongolian Chop Squad is an anime series adapted from the manga of the same title by Harold Sakuishi. The series consists of 26 episodes.

Beck was first aired on TV Tokyo in Japan on October 7, 2004, with the episode "The View at 14", and concluded with "America" on March 31, 2005. Beck first premiered in English on March 9, 2007, on Much Music in Canada. On September 1, 2008, Beck had premiered on the Funimation Channel in the United States. The first DVD was released in July 2007.

Though the titles are shown in Japanese in each episode's title cards, the English titles are also considered official along with the original ones (except for episode 7, originally called "Lucille" instead of "Prudence"). The opening theme for the series is "Hit in the USA" by Beat Crusaders, while two different songs were used for the ending: "My World Down", by Meister (which, in the show, is performed by the fictional band Dying Breed) from episodes 1 through 20, "Moon on the Water", also by Beat Crusaders (featuring Sowelu on vocals) from episode 21 to 25, and "Slip Out" by the eponymous band in the final episode.

== Episode list ==
No.	Title	Directed by	Original release date	English air date
1	"The View at 14"; Transliteration: "Jūyonsai no Fūkei" (Japanese: 十四歳の風景)	Osamu Kobayashi	October 7, 2004	March 9, 2007
Koyuki Tanaka is at a dead end. At the age of fourteen, he's already lost his passion for life. But Koyuki's chance encounter with a young musician named Ryusuke is about to open up a whole new road in front of him.
2	"Live House"; Transliteration: "Ikiteiru Ie" (Japanese: 生きている家)	Osamu Kobayashi	October 14, 2004	March 9, 2007
When Koyuki accepts Ryusuke's invitation to see his band perform live, he unwittingly sets down a path of self-discovery. But what Koyuki finds both disturbs and intrigues him, as the youngster uncovers the best and worst aspects of human nature. And though his world begins to expand, self-doubt and uncertainty threaten to send it collapsing in on itself.
3	"Moon on the Water"; Transliteration: "Mizu ni Tsuki" (Japanese: 水に月)	Kōtarō Miyake	October 21, 2004	March 10, 2007
Koyuki hangs out with Ryusuke and finds out more about music, and meets his sister, Maho, who later takes Koyuki to see Beck, her brother's dog.
4	"Strum the Guitar"; Transliteration: "Gitā o Tsumahikinasai" (Japanese: ギターをつま弾きなさい)	Jun Shishido	October 28, 2004	March 10, 2007
While Koyuki takes his first tentative steps toward learning guitar, Maho suggests that he'd be the perfect lead vocalist for Ryusuke's new band. But an accident threatens to shatter Ryusuke and Koyuki's friendship forever, as well as putting an end to Koyuki's musical aspirations-until help comes from a very unexpected source.
5	"Beck"; Transliteration: "Bekku" (Japanese: ベック)	Shinya Hanai	November 4, 2004	March 10, 2007
Koyuki's guitar training is coming along slowly but surely, until Saitou decides to speed things up by entering him to play in the annual summer festival! Meanwhile, Ryusuke and Chiba put their heads together to come up with a name for their new band. After the festival, Koyuki and Maho become closer while having a nude midnight swim together in the school pool.
6	"Hyodo and the Jaguar"; Transliteration: "Hyōdō to Jagā" (Japanese: 兵藤とジャガー)	Nobuharu Kamanaka	November 11, 2004	March 25, 2007
After enjoying their swim together, Maho gives Koyuki a special pick of hers. Taira, the newest member of Beck and the others have their first session together to start the band off on a good note. Koyuki's teacher is on maternity leave and a new cute teacher is introduced. As coordinator of the choir contest, she wants Koyuki to be the leader for the class to get them ready for the contest.
7	"Lucille"; Transliteration: "Rushīru" (Japanese: ルシール)	Kanji Wakabayashi	November 18, 2004	April 1, 2007
Koyuki tries to memorize the scales at Saitou's place. Later we can see Koyuki talking with the bullies and then scolded in the teacher's office. Maho meets with him, and at Saitou's place, Koyuki tells her why he started to work for the old man. This marks the first appearance of Ryusuke's guitar, "Lucille" ("Prudence" in the American original), notable for the several bullet holes it bears.
8	"Broadcast in the School"; Transliteration: "Kōnai Hōsō" (Japanese: 校内放送)	Osamu Kobayashi	November 25, 2004	April 1, 2007
Koyuki visits an instrument shop and practices some more. The school year ends. Next Momoko meets Koyuki accidentally going in Saitou's place and decides to go with him to check whether he works there. Koyuki tries to sell off Saitou's pornographic magazines.
9	"The Night Before LIVE"; Transliteration: "LIVE Zen'ya" (Japanese: LIVE前夜)	Kōtarō Miyake	December 2, 2004	April 8, 2007
Koyuki and Saku become friends. Koyuki gets nominated for the most difficult swimming races in the school's competition, and is cheered on by Maho. Koyuki takes Saku to see Beck's show.
10	"FACE"; Transliteration: "Hyōmen" (Japanese: 表面)	Kōtarō Miyake	December 9, 2004	April 8, 2007
After the show, Koyuki is sad about his guitar playing and Maho notices that he's wearing the pick she gave him as a necklace. At the rehearsal Koyuki wants to sing their new song. Everybody is stunned by his singing ability and even Taira is finally convinced that Koyuki should be the part of Beck.
11	"Summer Holidays"; Transliteration: "Kaki Kyūka" (Japanese: 夏季休暇)	Shinya Hanai	December 16, 2004	April 15, 2007
The band tries to raise some money and Chiba finds out that Dying Breed is coming to Japan. Later on Koyuki talks to a teacher about his decreasing grades. Momoko asks the band to enter the school festival. Maho and Koyuki have their first kiss. The band meets Dying Breed for the first time.
12	"Secret Live"; Transliteration: "Shīkuretto Raibu" (Japanese: シークレットライブ)	Hiroshi Hamasaki	December 23, 2004	April 15, 2007
Dying Breed performs in concert live in Japan, with Koyuki unexpectedly guest singing. Later on, Koyuki and Izumi meet again and she invites him for night-swimming, much to Maho's chagrin when she finds out. Meanwhile, Ryusuke finds out that somebody close to him has died.
13	"Ciel Bleu"; Transliteration: "Aoi Sora" (Japanese: 青い空)	Nobuharu Kamanaka	December 30, 2004	April 22, 2007
Ryusuke's been bothered by Erica Blige's death and often checks the news. At school, Saku and Koyuki form a band for the cultural festival with Tanabe and a bassist. Tanabe names the band Ciel Bleu. Hyodo tries to ruin Ciel Bleu's practice.
14	"Dream"; Transliteration: "Yume" (Japanese: 夢)	Yasuyuki Shinozaki	January 6, 2005	April 22, 2007
Mitty brings the cover design for the Beck band logo. Izumi meets up with Maho to clear the misunderstanding between them. During practice there's some tension between band members, who are pressured by the recording of the new album. But to make things worse, Koyuki is having a 39 degrees fever and thinks he's holding back the band. Koyuki loses consciousness sometime during the night and dreams a star-studded vision of his first concert.
15	"Back to School"; Transliteration: "Gakkō ni" (Japanese: 学校に)	Kazuya Komai	January 13, 2005	April 29, 2007
Koyuki tries to learn for his exams, but it doesn't go well. At school there's a rumor about Momoko working in a lingerie pub. Koyuki goes to a new school, it turns out Saku goes to the same school and so does Chiba. Koyuki goes to a guitar shop with Ryusuke to buy The Telecaster, but doesn't have enough cash for it. Eddy talks to Ryusuke about a package he had received with seven bullets, the same number as in Lucille.
16	"Indies"; Transliteration: "Indīzu" (Japanese: インディーズ)	Kōtarō Miyake	January 20, 2005	April 29, 2007
Gordie comes to see Eddie about the stolen stuff including Lucille. Then Eddie and Ryusuke talk about it on the phone. Koyuki still works hard to earn cash for the Telecaster and we can see a girl who works next door for the second time. At school, Tanaka finds out that one of Maho's friends is quite famous. Beck performs and is heard by Chicagoan records agent, named Frank Albin, allowing for a possible big break.
17	"Three Days"; Transliteration: "Surī Deizu" (Japanese: スリーデイズ)	Kōtarō Miyake	January 27, 2005	May 6, 2007
Ryusuke wants to release Beck's album in America. Koyuki finally buys the Telecaster. Koyuki sees at school the same girl, named Hiromi, who he saw in the doughnut store next to his workplace. Later at Saito's place Koyuki finds out that he's dating Momoko. Ryusuke learns that Beck's album is already selling in America, and we learn about Lucille and her history.
18	"Leon Sykes"; Transliteration: "Reon Saikusu" (Japanese: レオン·サイクス)	Shinya Hanai	February 3, 2005	May 6, 2007
Koyuki talks with his boss about his band. Saku then joins Koyuki at Saito's swimming practice. Beck is allowed to perform at the Marquee's evening show as Hitode's support, because the manager really liked Koyuki's singing. Maho meets with record company executives. Ryusuke gets the American version of the band's record, and is utterly dissatisfied with the cover art because it depicts him playing Lucille, knowing the consequences that single picture would bring. Leon Sykes comes to Tokyo, and his first act there is cornering Ryusuke at his own house by the fishing pond.
19	"Blues"; Transliteration: "Burūsu" (Japanese: ブルース)	Mitsuhiro Yoneda	February 10, 2005	May 13, 2007
Ryusuke (along with Beck and Lucille) get kidnapped by Sykes, who takes him to meet his uncle, the bluesman John Lee Davis, who wanted to know who had stolen Lucille. Upon meeting Davis, one of his musical inspirations, Ryusuke has a jam session which overwhelms his idol, so much so he convinces Sykes not to kill him. So, four days after his kidnapping, Ryusuke is returned, badly beaten, but alive (but Sykes keeps Beck and Prudence with him). As he asserts the situation to Taira and Chiba, Koyuki and Saku, who were looking after the fishing pond for Ryusuke, are visited by one of the managers of the Greatful Sound Festival, Kazuo Sato, who is ecstatic to meet Koyuki after seeing him sing in the Dying Breed's tour movie. Koyuki later gets the chance to see himself on the silver screen, along with Maho.
20	"Greatful Sound"; Transliteration: "Gureitofuru Saundo" (Japanese: グレイトフルサウンド)	Nobuharu Kamanaka	February 17, 2005	May 13, 2007
At the fishing pond the band talks with Kazuo about Greatful Sound. She wants Ryusuke to ask Eddie to come. Ryusuke agrees, but he also wants Beck to play although Ran is strongly against it. Ryusuke says that he'll get Sykes' support in order to get Beck to play. After the movie, Yoshito announces that he's going to play in Greatful Sound along with Belle Ame. Later, Ryusuke explains a dream he had, which is the same Koyuki had some days ago, in which dead rock stars appeared picking up trash (meaning they are cleaning up after Beck). Incidentally, Saku and Taira had had such a dream as well. Later, Maho sneaks into Koyuki's house and decides to sleep over, making him ponder about their relationship. The next day, Koyuki becomes the talk of the school due to his appearance at the Dying Breed movie, while Ryusuke gets in touch with Sykes.
21	"Write Music"; Transliteration: "Ongaku o Kakinasai" (Japanese: 音楽を書きなさい)	Mitsuyuki Masuhara	February 24, 2005	May 20, 2007
Ryusuke talks with Chiba and Taira about his talk with Sykes. Back at school, Hiromi talks with Koyuki and Saku about playing guitar. Ryusuke wants to make a new CD, and proposes they write new songs for it. Later on, Ryusuke, Taira and Saku go to a live show in which Chiba is performing with another band, knowing that he is doing so just out of worry that Beck may not take off as quickly as he would like. That night, when Maho comes over to Koyuki's house again, Page (which Koyuki is taking care of for Saito, who is on a business trip) flies off and they go looking for him, while they start commenting on how common Koyuki thinks himself to be, though Maho has quite an opposite opinion. Later at home, Koyuki starts strumming an improvised melody on his guitar, so beautiful that it brings Page back and makes him sing to it. The next night, while Sykes takes Ryusuke for their business meeting (where he will impose his conditions for Beck to perform at Greatful Sound), Koyuki goes further into his self-thought song (which will become "Slip Out"), eventually showing his progress to Ryusuke. Despite the amateurism of the production, this song gives Ryusuke the push he needs to take Beck into Greatful Sound.
22	"Performance Eve Festival" (Also known as "The Night Before the Festival")"; Transliteration: "Zen'yasai" (Japanese: 前夜祭)	Kazuyoshi Yaginuma	March 3, 2005	May 20, 2007
The band tries to improve the new song and Koyuki tries to write the lyrics, at Ryusuke's request. Saito tries to help Koyuki come up with some lyrics. Surprisingly for him, the lyrics written by Saito are much more well received than those he wrote himself, so much so Ryusuke rewords the song in English. The band later departs for the Greatful Sound grounds, where they will perform on the smallest of the three stages. Ryusuke reveals Sykes' conditions to Chiba and Taira: he will have the rights over the band's next releases, as well as the promotion over the band. Ryusuke also reveals that he, in turn, established one condition on his own: Sykes will have to leave the theft of Beck and Lucille, if the band gets the highest attendance of the festival. Koyuki and Yoshito make a bet: if Maho comes to see Yoshito, then Koyuki must give up on her. Koyuki later is approached by a foreign band to perform for them, but the performance goes away because of his inability with English and he is booed off the stage.
23	"Festival"; Transliteration: "Shukusai" (Japanese: 祝祭)	Toshiharu Sato	March 10, 2005	May 27, 2007
The Greatful Sound festival is on, with Belle Ame on the primary stage, Malcolm (a Sykes-managed rapper) on the second stage, and Beck on the smallest third stage. Veteran Beck members think that if they fail to get more people than the other stages they should retire. Ryusuke mentions that he agreed to the bet because of the dream and then says some harsh words to Chiba, who runs away. The band starts to drift apart, with Taira standing for Chiba, as he goes around the festival site looking for his friend with Koyuki and Saku's help. Eventually, the three remaining band members think of quitting, due to the rain and being unable to find Chiba. Against the odds, Koyuki decides to go up on stage with only an acoustic guitar and starts playing a cover of "I've Got a Feeling" by the Beatles*. Shortly into the song he is accompanied by Saku; they start to make the crowd sway and flow with the song.: _{The cover features new instrumentals with the same lyrics. The English dub uses the same instrumentals as the song in the Japanese version, but instead uses the lyrics to "50 Cent Wisdom" by Beat Crusaders.}
24	"Third Stage"; Transliteration: "Sādo Sutēji" (Japanese: サードステージ)	Motonobu Hori	March 17, 2005	May 27, 2007
After the band seems to break up before their time on the third stage, the band is slowly reforming just in time to play their hearts out for the growing crowd. Ryuusuke has returned after being given Lucille to play on and Chiba races back to the third stage after thwarting his kidnappers. Meanwhile, the worsening weather forces interruptions at the other two stages, frustrating Eiji and angering Sykes.
25	"Slip Out"; Transliteration: "Surippu" (Japanese: スリップ)	Osamu Kobayashi	March 24, 2005	June 3, 2007
As Beck's set finishes up, the reality that it's Beck's last performance finally sets in. Koyuki and Maho realize their love for each other and time goes on and the members of BECK move on with their lives. One month and a half later, Koyuki gets an unexpected phone call from Kazuo Sato, who takes her to a meeting with none other than Sykes, who had seen him perform at Greatful Sound and expresses his desire to produce a solo album for Koyuki, but he politely refuses. With Ryusuke missing, Chiba wanting to assemble his own ramen shop, Taira in another band and the news that Saku will transfer to another school, Koyuki's uneasiness returns day by day, even more so after he and Saku part ways.
26	"America"; Transliteration: "Amerika" (Japanese: アメリカ)	Osamu Kobayashi	March 31, 2005	June 3, 2007
Koyuki plans to revive Beck and sets out to get the band together. After talking to Chiba and Taira and getting them to join, Saku finally makes his way back to town to join up with the others and the band is finally back together (except for Ryusuke, who is making a living as a street musician in New York City when John Lee Davis approaches him offering help in anything he might need). Great news comes in the form of an invitation to tour with a band in the United States of America, and along the way they end up meeting Ryusuke again at Seattle. Leon Sykes also gets arrested. Beck plays a gig, all of them including Ryuusuke, their future is told in the manga (which also chronicles the lead-up to the US Tour in more detail).
