= List of Area 88 episodes =

Official DVD collection of Area 88 released by A.D. Vision.

Area 88 (エリア88, Eria Hachi-Jū-Hachi) is a Japanese manga series by Kaoru Shintani that has been animated as an OVA and a television series in Japan.

== Episodes ==
No.	Title	Original release date
1	"Sky Blue - Desert Wings"; Transliteration: "Sky Blue - Sabaku no Tsubasa" (Japanese: Sky Blue - 砂漠の翼)	January 8, 2004
Hearing rumors of a Japanese mercenary pilot fighting for the Asranian military, journalist Makoto Shinjou is dispatched to Area 88 to cover the story as an embedded reporter by the Asranian armed forces. He later meets and becomes fixated on Shin Kazama, a pilot haunted by his past and the only Japanese national to fight in Asran.
2	"Boris - Tombstone of the Setting Sun"; Transliteration: "Boris - Yūhi no Bohyō" (Japanese: Boris - 夕陽の墓標)	January 15, 2004
Boris, a former British Royal Air Force pilot, suffers from survivor guilt as he is the only pilot to survive every mission he is assigned to. His reputation as the 'God of Death' precedes him and makes other pilots unwilling to fly with him, but he is still a master when it comes to attacking ground targets. When an enemy outpost proves itself strangely unassailable, Boris flies again, accompanied by Shin and the young pilot named Kim Aoba, whose need for money is stronger than his fear of the God of Death.
3	"Shin & Makoto - Finder of a Blue Sky"; Transliteration: "Shin & Makoto - Aozora no Finder" (Japanese: Shin & Makoto - 蒼空のファインダー)	January 22, 2004
On a sortie, Shin and Kim take out a heavily defended transport plane, but are unable to determine its contents. Another Area 88 mercenary pilot hears the word 'gold' in enemy transmissions, and soon most of the mercenaries are out in the sky looking for the transport's remains. Meanwhile, Makoto rents a two-seater plane and convinces Shin to give him a ride. A previous conversation with McCoy, the base's supplier, make Shin suspicious of the journalist's true intentions.
4	"Desert - Skies of Betrayal"; Transliteration: "Desert - Uragiri no Sora" (Japanese: Desert - 裏切りの空)	January 29, 2004
Shin's old F-8 Crusader proves to be no match for the rebel MiG-21 fighters, and he is shot down over the desert. While his friends comb the desolate dunes, Shin remembers better days with Ryouko Tsugumo, his old girlfriend in Japan, and the event that sent him to the Area: the betrayal of his childhood friend, Satoru Kanzaki, who made him sign that fateful contract with the Asran mercenary forces.
5	"Lip Stick - Unyielding Rouge"; Transliteration: "Lip Stick - Kachiki na Rouge" (Japanese: Lip Stick - 勝気なルージュ)	February 5, 2004
During a mission, a Mirage F1 appears from nowhere and saves Kim from enemy bandits. The pilot is Area 88's new recruit: Kitori Palvanaff, Saki's own cousin. The presence of a female in the base drives most of the all-male personnel of the Area into a state of frenzy, but Kitori becomes solely interested in the aloof Shin. Both are left alone after the other pilots depart for an attack mission, but a surprise assault by the enemy forces them to fly together.
6	"Cross Over - Intersection of Solitude"; Transliteration: "Cross Over - Kodoku no Kousaten" (Japanese: Cross Over - 孤独の交差点)	February 12, 2004
Shin's new plane, an F-5 Tiger II, finally arrives. After rejecting a duel offer made by Kitori, Shin takes the Tiger for a maiden run. In Europe, Kanzaki is also facing a difficult test: his first transcontinental flight to Japan as a commercial pilot and their paths cross as due to inclement weather.
7	"Hungry Boy - Sweet Soldier"; Transliteration: "Hungry Boy - Sweet Soldier" (Japanese: Hungry Boy - スイートソルジャー)	February 19, 2004
In order to eliminate Area 88 once and for all, the rebels start aiming for the transport planes that make the dangerous supply runs for the base. The situation becomes critical as fuel and ammo start running low, and Saki tasks Shin with the desperate mission of breaking the blockade. Along him are Kitori and Kim, who is having severe doubts about his ability as a pilot.
8	"Sand Glass - Sand's Bullet"; Transliteration: "Sand Glass - Suna no Juudan" (Japanese: Sand Glass - 砂の銃弾)	February 26, 2004
When Area 88 comes under attack by a lone sniper, Saki becomes forced to cancel all missions as the runway is under the unknown assailant's line of fire. There is only one man in the base that truly understands how the sniper's mind works - Makoto Shinjou. Racing against time, he and the Area's personnel hatch an elaborate plan to neutralize the sniper.
9	"Canyon - Tightrope at the Speed of Sound"; Transliteration: "Canyon - Onsoku no Tightrope" (Japanese: Canyon - 音速のタイトロープ)	March 4, 2004
In order to secure fuel supplies for the Asranian forces, Saki orders an attack mission targeting a rebel refinery. The only way to bypass the rebel air defenses is by flying through a canyon at high speed. The Area's top pilots are selected for this mission, which is to be led by Major Roundell, Area 88's chief tactical advisor. Makoto asks Mickey Simon to let him fly in his F-14 Tomcat, wishing to take pictures of the hell only combat pilots can see.
10	"Fire Ball - Contrails of Destiny"; Transliteration: "Fire Ball - Unmei no Contrail" (Japanese: Fire Ball - 運命のコントレール)	March 11, 2004
Rumors that the rebels are hiring mercenaries of their own reach Area 88. One squadron is almost completely decimated by one of these newcomers, a vicious MiG-23 Flogger pilot who favors a strange combat tactic and sports a red lizard as an emblem. For Mickey, this pilot's arrival is a painful reminder of his days in the US Navy squadron VF-96 "Fighting Falcons" and the Vietnam War.
11	"Truth - Truth of the Sand"; Transliteration: "Truth - Suna no Shinjitsu" (Japanese: Truth - 砂の真実)	March 18, 2004
Shin is very close to obtaining the US$1.5 million required to terminate his contract and return to Japan, but during his final sortie, he becomes dangerously nervous during a routine and crashes on the runway while landing. Meanwhile, Kanzaki conspires with shadowy businessmen to take over Yamato Air Lines, which belong to Ryouko's father and forges Shin's death certificate to marry Shin's girlfriend in one fell swoop. Greg Gates, another of the Area's mercenaries, learns from McCoy the truth behind Makoto's mission and with the other pilots confronts Makoto.
12	"Lock On - Wings of the Wind"; Transliteration: "Lock On - Kaze no Tsubasa" (Japanese: Lock on -風の翼)	March 25, 2004
Shin's damaged Tiger II crashes in the Area's airstrip. While he himself is unharmed, Saki, who is unwilling to lose a pilot of Shin's caliber, forces him to pay for all damages, extending Shin's stay in Area 88. Makoto is forced to leave the base after Greg revealed his true objective to his fellow pilots, but before leaving he tells Shin that Kanzaki plans to marry Ryouko. Driven to the edge, Shin rents another Tiger from McCoy, loaded to the brim with fuel and ammo, and heads for the nearest border to defect- with Kitori, Mickey, Kim, and all of the other Area 88 mercenaries on his heels to shoot him down. They are able to convince him not to defect and he leads them into battle against an approaching enemy force. Makoto makes it to Japan in time and informs Ryoko that Shin is still alive, who then runs away from the wedding, in her dress. Shin is later shown to be at Area 88, continuing to fight, hoping to one day earn his freedom.
