= List of Yumeria episodes =

The 12-episode anime television series Yumeria (ゆめりあ) was developed by Studio Deen from the Namco game and was broadcast on TBS in Japan in 2004. The series was originally licensed and released in North America by ADV Films in three DVD volumes beginning in 2005 and in DVD collections in 2009. In 2013 Sentai Filmworks licensed the series, released a complete DVD collection of all twelve episodes of the ADV Films English version and posted the episodes for streaming from the Anime Network online streaming site.

== Plot summary ==
On his 16th birthday, Tomokazu Mikuri had a realistic dream where he sees a girl battling a giant floating monstrosity. When he wakes up, he is surprised that the girl is actually sleeping next to him! Whenever he sleeps from now on, he ends up back at the dream world, and more and more people that he knows keep showing up there too. He finds out from a mysterious masked woman in the dream world named Silk that they are fighting against one named Faydoom, and he is the one who provides the powers to those girls so that they can fight these monsters.

== Episode list ==
No.	Title	Original release date
1	"16th Birthday"; Transliteration: "Baasudi 16" (Japanese: バースデイ・16)	January 8, 2004
Tomokazu Mikuri is an ordinary sophomore in high school living with his older cousin, Nanase, who finds himself in the dream world on his 16th birthday. There he meets Mone, a mysterious young girl, battling a strange enemy called Faydoom. When he awakens from his dream, he finds Mone in his bed! After a crazy day of finding Mone in his room, to school, and then his birthday party, Tomokazu falls asleep and finds himself back in the dream world.
2	"Tomokazu Zero Points"; Transliteration: "Tomokazu Reiten" (Japanese: 智和0点)	January 15, 2004
Tomokazu receives a zero on his test and Mizuki helps him study for his makeup test. When the day of the makeup test arrives, he is accused of making the test and text books disappear. He learns that Mone has taken and burned the test and text book leading to some harsh words that send him into the dream world where he meets the mysterious Silk who informs him that the dream world is known as Moera and that he possesses a special talent that will help bring Faydoom down.
3	"Bloomer V"; Transliteration: "Burumaa V" (Japanese: ブルマ―V (ファイブ))	January 22, 2004
Nanase's younger sister, Kuyou, returns to Japan from America where she and their parents have been living. When Kuyou goes to school with Tomokazu and Mone, Tomokazu finds himself facing an irate Mister Ishikari and his fellow male students ready to pulverize him on the field playing dodge ball. A dodge ball game gone bad sends Tomokazu back to the dream world where he finds Kuyou has also entered where the enemy is waiting and where new transformations take place.
4	"School Swimsuit Big Strategy"; Transliteration: "Sukumizu Daisakusen" (Japanese: スク水大作戦)	January 29, 2004
Tomokazu finds himself undergoing special training in order to increase his power and abilities. When he breaks his promise to teach Kuyou to swim and goes to the pool to ogle at girls in swimsuits with Mone and Neneko, Tomokazu finds himself at the mercy of Kuyou's wrath in the dream world. Sleeping has never been such pain for Tomokazu.
5	"Girl Watching at the Dream Beach"; Transliteration: "Yumebiichi de Uocchi" (Japanese: 夢ビーチでウォッチ)	February 5, 2004
Tomokazu and the girls go swimming at the beach that had appeared in the Dream World in the previous episode. Tomokazu finds out that Mizuki is going to be transferring to a different school, and is sad at losing her. But in the end, the transfer is called off, and Mizuki moves in with Tomokazu.
6	"Master of Yukata"; Transliteration: "Yukata no Tatsujin" (Japanese: 浴衣の達人)	February 12, 2004
Tomokazu and the girls enjoy themselves at a summer festival. Nanase remembers when Tomokazu was a boy, and she swore to protect him.
7	"The Reverse Re-Incarnating Woman"; Transliteration: "Gyakurinne no Onna" (Japanese: 逆輪廻の女)	February 19, 2004
Tomokazu is curious about where Neneko comes from and follows her, to find out that there are two personalities within her: normal Neneko and Neito. Neito is a woman who has reverse reincarnated from the future, and tells him that the future has been destroyed by the Faydooms, and only few survive, but Tomokazu has the chance to transform destiny and change the future.
8	"Our Reason"; Transliteration: "Bokutachi no Kotowari" (Japanese: 僕たちの理)	February 26, 2004
An aurora appears in the sky over the city. Some of the girls think it's a message from aliens, but Neito says it's a sign that the Faydooms are beginning to attack the real world. Neneko disappears, and it turns out that she's been trying to fight the Faydooms all by herself, so no one else would have to get involved.
9	"Bunny Man"; Transliteration: "Usagiman" (Japanese: ウサギマン)	March 4, 2004
Tomokazu searches for Mone's family, which upsets her because she thinks he doesn't want her around anymore. In order to make it up to her, he lets her buy things through the mail, but she orders more than he can afford and he gets a job to cover the expenses as a bunny character in a kid's show.
10	"The Taste of Katsudon"; Transliteration: "Katsudon no Aji" (Japanese: カツ丼の味)	March 11, 2004
The Man in Black brings Tomokazu to the main house. Neito and the head of the family reveal that Nanase and Kuyou are Watchers for the family, and they have been watching Tomokazu since he was born. The head of the family says that Tomokazu will need his help to bring about a correct Destiny Transformation. He tells Tomokazu to accept his help.
11	"Destiny Transformation"; Transliteration: "Unmei Henkaku" (Japanese: 運命変革)	March 18, 2004
Silk's identity is finally revealed; Mone mysteriously disappears and the gang goes to search for her. Neito appears and says the final battle is that night. Tomokazu tells Kuyou not to use the Arrow of Destiny, because he can't trust it, and is afraid it might kill her. During the battle Mone appears and a shocking discovery about her is learned.
12	"Tomokazu, 100 Points"; Transliteration: "Tomokazu Hyakuten" (Japanese: 智和100点)	March 25, 2004
Tomokazu wakes up in school. Things are different in this new world. He doesn't even remember Mizuki, Kuyou, Nanase, Neneko, or Mone. But luckily Neito finds him, and tells him that this fake world is not where he belongs. Tomokazu starts to remember. He finds Mone, and together they go to the Dream World to fight.

The runtime for the TV episodes is approximately 24 minutes.

== See also ==
- List of Yumeria characters
