= List of Battle B-Daman episodes =

This is a list of episodes from Battle B-Daman.

== Season 1 ==
No.	Title	Original release date	English air date
1	"Cobalt Blade"; Transliteration: "Kobaruto Burēdo Tōjō!" (Japanese: コバルトブレード登場！)	January 5, 2004	April 2, 2005
Yamato, who was raised by cats until he was five, has dreamed of owning a B-Daman and playing the sport. When his dream comes true and is given the legendary B-Daman, Cobalt Blade, will Yamato have what it takes to control it from those who wish to steal it from him?
2	"B-DaBattle Mountain"; Transliteration: "Hayate no Tani no Taiketsu!" (Japanese: 疾風の谷の対決！)	January 12, 2004	April 2, 2005
In a rematch against Grey, Yamato learns how to better control Cobalt Blade. During the match, Bull's "dark side" makes his first appearance in order to steal both Cobalt Blade and Chrome Zephyr. It is up to Grey and Yamato to keep that from happening. Can Grey and Yamato put their differences aside to stop him?
3	"Something to Crow About"; Transliteration: "Sononaha Shadō!!" (Japanese: その名はシャドウ!!)	January 19, 2004	April 3, 2005
Eager to B-DaBattle other B-DaPlayers, Yamato learns of the B-Coliseum, a place where all B-DaPlayers can play all sorts of B-Daman games. When he gets there he soon realizes that he still has a lot to learn about the sport. But when a mysterious member of the Shadow Alliance shows up, it's up to Yamato to put his skills to the test and stop the evil Battle Crow from destroying the B-Coliseum.
4	"Ice to Meet You"; Transliteration: "Seinaru Yama no Wana!" (Japanese: 聖なる山のわな！)	January 26, 2004	April 9, 2005
Ababa sends Wen and Li to take control of Cobalt Blade after Battle Crow's failed attempt. Yamato, Grey, and Bull run into Wen and Li on Delta Rock where they must B-DaBattle them in order to save Chrome Zephyr from a pillar of ice. If Yamato and Bull can't defeat Wen and Li, Grey will lose Chrome Zephyr forever. But things get a lot more difficult when both Wen and Li combine their B-Damans to form Bakurekuso.
5	"Gray and the Blues"; Transliteration: "Hikisaka Reta Yūjō!" (Japanese: ひきさかれた友情！)	February 2, 2004	April 10, 2005
Wen and Li win the match thanks to Li's cheating, and Yamato discovers Grey is a member of the Shadow Alliance. Yamato was in shock when he heard this, and he was very angry.
6	"Yamato & Terry's Excellent Adventure"; Transliteration: "Densetsu o Motomete!!" (Japanese: 伝説をもとめて!!)	February 9, 2004	April 16, 2005
Yamato goes onward to find Armada, but, on the way, Yamato meets Terry, who follows Yamato to find Armada, but, the two keep getting in fights. When they made it to Armada, they were given a test. The test was to draw circles & triangles all over the place, even underwater! A swarm of paper bats put their abilities to the test as well as learning Rapid-Shooting, but, what will Armada's next challenge be?
7	"A Fistful of B-DaBalls"; Transliteration: "10 Man-Patsu no Shiren" (Japanese: 10万発の試練)	February 16, 2004	April 23, 2005
Armada's next test is to knock down the statue of Armada with 100,000 B-DaBalls! At first it seemed impossible, but, later, when the dam was breaking, Terry & Yamato use the Rapid-Shooting technique to knock down the statue & save the town!
8	"Yamato Versus The Masked Marble"; Transliteration: "Uināzu Kaimaku!" (Japanese: ウイナーズ・開幕！)	February 23, 2004	April 24, 2005
Yamato, Terry, and Armada arrive to the Winner's Tournament and are also surprised to see Mie there as well. In the Winner's Tournament, the B-DaPlayer's task is to play "Shoot the Gap", until Yamato knocks the pins down accidentally, but manages to tie with Castio, will Yamato be able to advance?
9	"The Bull Supremacy"; Transliteration: "Kaettekita Buru!" (Japanese: 帰ってきたブル！)	March 1, 2004	April 30, 2005
Yamato runs into Bull at the Winner's Tournament allowing the two friends to be reunited, but Terry doubts Bull's blading skills forcing a B-DaBattle. who will win this battle, and what is the Shadow Alliance doing with their eyes on Bull?
10	"The Bull Identity"; Transliteration: "Tamashī ko ga Shite!" (Japanese: 魂こがして！)	March 8, 2004	May 1, 2005
Bull has been taken over by Ababa. Can Yamato find some way to restore his friend to his original self while he must battle him in the first round of the Winner's Tournament?
11	"Monkey Business"; Transliteration: "Suna no Kuni Kara Kita Kyōdai" (Japanese: 砂の国から来た兄弟)	March 15, 2004	May 7, 2005
Yamato must help some new friends gain back their B-DaBucks after a monkey of the Shadow Alliance sells them faulty parts.
12	"Invasion of the B-Dasnatchers"; Transliteration: "Seigi Waga ni Ari" (Japanese: 正義は我にあり)	March 22, 2004	May 8, 2005
Enjyu finally takes to the stage in the Winner's Tournament first round. Just how powerful of a B-DaPlayer is he, and can anyone beat him when he has Cobalt Blade's brother?
13	"Hog Wild"; Transliteration: "Shin Kyattokafe e Yōkoso!" (Japanese: 新キャットカフェへようこそ！)	March 29, 2004	May 14, 2005
Li goes on an undercover mission to steal Cobalt Blade, but Mie's friendliness destroy's all his tricks. Can Li actually be trusted?
14	"That's What Friends Are For"; Transliteration: "Hashire Yamato! Otoko Dōshi no Yakusoku!" (Japanese: 走れヤマト！男同士の約束！)	April 5, 2004	May 15, 2005
In an intense battle – Terry takes on Li. Terry's B-Daman is broken and it's up to Yamato to fix it before the time runs out.
15	"The Good, the Bad and the B-DaPlayer"; Transliteration: "Shōkin o GET Shiro!" (Japanese: 賞金をGETしろ！)	April 12, 2004	May 21, 2005
The gang runs out of money and can't buy food or get to the second round of the Winner's Tournament. Luckily, a new 5 station tournament has begun. They enter, but can Yamato win the first match-up?
16	"Everybody's Got A Hungry Heart"; Transliteration: "Harapeko no Dai ni Sutēji" (Japanese: ハラペコの第二ステージ)	April 19, 2004	May 22, 2005
After taking a 1-0 lead in the 5 station challenge, Bull gets his turn in a power battle. It looks like he will fail due to hunger until a Ms. Karat brings him food for saving her, but what will be the results?
17	"There's B-DaBattle in My Soup"; Transliteration: "Kodoku no Senjō Shīrudo Sutēji" (Japanese: 孤独の戦場 シールドステージ)	April 26, 2004	June 4, 2005
Terry seems to be unappreciated when he tries to cook, but can he find a way to be a good soup maker while preparing for the next round of the Battle Tournament?
18	"The Karat Question"; Transliteration: "Karappo no Kokoro" (Japanese: 空っぽの心)	May 3, 2004	June 5, 2005
Down 2-1, Bull must battle between his 3 selves over what to do with Ms. Karat's affection, but will he be able to even it up, or will Bull and the gang be eliminated?
19	"Watt Are You Waiting For?"; Transliteration: "Go-banme no Kain" (Japanese: 五番目のカイン)	May 10, 2004	June 11, 2005
Ms. Karat's father, Watt, is looking for a worthy husband for Karat. He believes Bull's alternate personality could be the one, so he kidnaps him, but what will this mean for Yamato when he's left alone with a chance to win the tournament?
20	"With a Little Help From My Friends"; Transliteration: "Saishū Kessen! Sūpā Go Dai Fīrudo" (Japanese: 最終決戦！ スーパー五大フィールド)	May 17, 2004	June 12, 2005
Karat helps Bull escape, and then Terry saves the two of them, but will they be able to get back to the Battle 5 tournament and root Yamato to a victory when Yamato is even 1-1 and in a first hit wins competition for match 3?
21	"Great B-DaBalls of Fire"; Transliteration: "Yūjō o Kirisaku Kuroi Wana" (Japanese: 友情を切り裂く黒い罠)	May 24, 2004	June 18, 2005
Yamato learns the truth about Grey's sister, and is about to throw the B-DaBattle until Grey knocks some sense into him. The two resume the battle, but who will advance to the final 4?
22	"The Rapid and the Powerful"; Transliteration: "Shōbu wa Furu Supīdo!" (Japanese: 勝負はフルスピード！)	May 31, 2004	June 19, 2005
Only one of these warriors can advance. Will it be Yamato or Grey, especially with Grey's sister Liena being on the line should he lose. Enjyu is sure to make it more interesting.
23	"Who's Who?"; Transliteration: "Kōri no Yōna Aitsu" (Japanese: 氷のようなアイツ)	June 7, 2004	June 25, 2005
Terry gets his chance of advancing the final 4 semi-finals, but he must defeat Grey's sister, Liena, to do so. Who will advance, and can Grey find a way to save his sister?
24	"Twisted Sister Act"; Transliteration: "Kokoro ni Todoke! Būsuto Magunamu!!" (Japanese: 心に届け！ ブーストマグナム!!)	June 14, 2004	June 26, 2005
Yamato and company break into the Shadow Alliance's base hoping to save Liena, but instead it leads to a Liena/Grey showdown. Who will prevail?
25	"That's No B-Daman, That's My Sister"; Transliteration: "Kobaruto Burēdo Chiru!" (Japanese: コバルトブレード散る！)	June 21, 2004	July 2, 2005
With Yamato and Liena advancing, Cain and some of the others from the Battle 5 tournament return to offer their congratulations, but do they really want to congratulate them, or do they have something else sinister planned? Can Yamato battle some sense into them?
26	"Cobalt Saber"; Transliteration: "Kobaruto Seibā Tanjō!" (Japanese: コバルトセイバー誕生！)	June 28, 2004	July 3, 2005
The gang decides to help Yamato build a new blade with a new upgraded system, but the Battle 5 members may have something to say about it. What exactly is Cobalt Saber, and what type of power does it have?
27	"For a Few B-DaBalls More"; Transliteration: "Kachinuke! Kyōi no Kōsō Batoru!!" (Japanese: 勝ちぬけ！驚異の高層バトル！！)	July 5, 2004	July 9, 2005
As the Winner's Tournament continues, Yamato is set to have his first battle with his newly-created B-Daman, Cobalt Saber. Has Yamato learned to master its true power yet, or does he still have a lot to learn?
28	"High Stakes"; Transliteration: "Hijōnaru Tatakai" (Japanese: 非情なる戦い)	July 12, 2004	July 10, 2005
It's now time for Enjyu and Wen to have their own Power Alley match, but after Wen refused to lose to Enjyu on purpose, what plans does Enjyu have for him in their match?
29	"Hurry Up and Wait"; Transliteration: "Shukuteki! Bureijingu Kaizā Tōjō!" (Japanese: 宿敵！ブレイジングカイザー登場！)	July 19, 2004	July 16, 2005
It's the festival night before the day of the final round of the Winners Tournament. With the Shadow Alliance still after Cobalt Saber, what tricks does Enjyu have up his sleeve to ensure his victory over Yamato?
30	"All About Enjyu"; Transliteration: "Norowareta-en" (Japanese: 呪われた炎)	July 26, 2004	July 17, 2005
It's almost time for round two of the final match of the Winner's Tournament. But Liena's intuition tells her that there is still some good left in Enjyu, despite how evil he acts on the outside. What is it about Enjyu's past that makes him who he is today?
31	"And the Winner is ..."; Transliteration: "Saigo no Shōri-sha-tachi!" (Japanese: 最後の勝利者たち！)	August 2, 2004	July 23, 2005
It's the final match of the Winner's Tournament. Who will win – Yamato or Enjyu?
32	"The Return of the B-DaPlayer"; Transliteration: "Kaettekita de! Kautoūn!" (Japanese: 帰ってきたで！カウトゥーン！)	August 9, 2004	July 24, 2005
After a successful victory at the Winner's Tournament, Yamato returns to his hometown along with his friends. What new surprises await for them there? And what will become of the Shadow Alliance now that only Ababa and Marda B. remain?
33	"Enraging Bull"; Transliteration: "Saraba Herio Bureikā" (Japanese: さらばヘリオブレイカー)	August 16, 2004	July 30, 2005
Over in the town of Carlitoville, a couple of new B-DaPlayers are causing trouble for the villagers there. Who are they, and what exactly are their intentions?
34	"Rebel Without a B-Daman"; Transliteration: "Kautoūn no Kettō" (Japanese: カウトゥーンの決闘)	August 23, 2004	July 31, 2005
Bull reveals that his B-Daman was destroyed because he used it too much, and that Grey's Chrome Zephyr will meet the same fate if Grey battles against the Longhorn Brothers. Grey refuses to sit back though, and he and Terry tag team against the Longhorn Brothers, but when Terry gets knocked out and Chrome Zephyr gets damaged, it's up to Bull to gain the victory. Can he complete a new B-Daman for Grey and complete repairs on Cobalt Saber in time?
35	"The Good, the Bad and the B-Daman"; Transliteration: "Gekitō! Kuromu Revuan!" (Japanese: 激闘！ クロムレヴァン！)	August 30, 2004	August 6, 2005
With Cobalt Saber having been repaired, Yamato joins Grey taking Terry's spot in the battle. The two blaster core systems appear to give them an advantage until the Longhorn brothers get powered up. Old friends return to bring this battle to an exciting conclusion, but the new Neo-Shadow Alliance appears to be causing trouble for all. Can they find a way to beat them?
36	"Yamato Versus the Masked Marble Part 2"; Transliteration: "Aratanaru Tabidachi" (Japanese: 新たなる旅立ち)	September 6, 2004	August 7, 2005
Wen and Li report that the Neo-Shadow Alliance is growing, so Yamato and company become determined to stop it. One big problem occurs though, they've been forbidden to interfere. Of course they disregard those orders, but how will they do in ultimate knockdown when the pins weigh 100 times the normal amount against an old rival from the Winner's Tournament?
37	"The Lion's Den"; Transliteration: "Eikō no Bīdā Gakuen" (Japanese: 栄光のビーダー学園)	September 13, 2004	August 13, 2005
Asato returns to join Yamato and the others after finishing his B-Daman training journey. He offers to take them to see the B-Daman Academy he's attending. But something strange is happening to all the students. Does Marda B. and the Neo-Shadow Alliance have anything to do with it?
38	"Food Fight"; Transliteration: "Kyūkyoku no o Ryōri Batoru!" (Japanese: 究極のお料理バトル！)	September 20, 2004	August 14, 2005
In search of the mysterious B-DaSage that Manuel told them about, Yamato and the others travel to the town of Liken, along with Wen and Li, which is their hometown. Will they be able to find out Marda B.'s big secret once and for all?
39	"The B-DaWinds of Change"; Transliteration: "Kyōfu no Bīdā Tokkun-sho!" (Japanese: 恐怖のビーダー特訓所！)	October 4, 2004	August 27, 2005
The guys stop while Bull repairs Wing Ninja, and the cafe stops to fill up on gas. They end up stopping in Sly's home town where Marda B. is at his work again, and once again Liena is targeted to become his slave. Will Wen and Li agree to Sly's training to keep them all safe? Can Sly help the resistance defeat Marda B? Find out as the B-DaWinds of Change airs today.
40	"Over Troubled Water"; Transliteration: "Taiketsu! Kaizoku Bīdā" (Japanese: 対決！海賊ビーダー)	September 27, 2004	August 21, 2005
Yamato, Terry, Grey, and Bull have reached as far as west as they can by land. So they decide to sneak aboard a ship to get across, but encounter one of Marda B.'s henchmen along the way.
41	"They Call Me Yamato"; Transliteration: "Kōnoshima no Shiren" (Japanese: 神の島の試練)	October 11, 2004	September 17, 2005
The gang makes it to a resort island where Yamato learns how to channel more power behind Cobalt Saber's power blast. When Armada learns of this, he figures out a way to test Yamato's new strength at the Meowtra temple, but can Yamato pass the test?
42	"Lake B-Daman"; Transliteration: "Enju Futatabi" (Japanese: 炎呪再び)	October 18, 2004	September 18, 2005
The gang arrives in Terry's home town where Terry tells them the legend of Lake B-DaMan, but when the gang is attacked by Enjyu only an old friend can help them out with a new blaster core B-Daman.
43	"With Friends Like These"; Transliteration: "Saraba Kyōdai" (Japanese: さらば兄弟)	October 25, 2004	October 1, 2005
Terry has helped Joe defeat the invaders in his hometown. Meanwhile, Enjyu persuades Li to turn against Wen and join the Neo-Shadow Alliance to help Enjyu with his agenda.
44	"Meet the Neo-Shadow Alliance"; Transliteration: "Neo Shadō sō Kōgeki!" (Japanese: ネオシャドウ総攻撃！)	November 1, 2004	October 2, 2005
Wen returns and joins the team with the news that Li has joined the Neo Shadow Alliance, but that's not the only bad news around. Biarce has begun attacking all the world's B-DaPlayer's. With Mega Diaboros' ability to use energy from the B-Da Players that have been turned to stone it looks like it is the end for Yamato and company, but can Yamato and Cobalt Saber find a way to reverse the effects, or will they end up becoming another victim in the seemingly endless number of victims?
45	"B-DaBreakdown Part 1"; Transliteration: "Batorā no Kokoro" (Japanese: バトラーの心)	November 8, 2004	October 8, 2005
Joshua seeks out Yamato and asks him to help unlook Cain's true heart, but is he leading the gang into a trap, or does he really want Cain to be free hearted again? Also Wen decides how to free Li, but can he get by the members of the Neo Shadow Alliance?
46	"B-DaBreakdown, Part 2"; Transliteration: "Takusa Reta Yūjō!" (Japanese: 託された友情！)	November 15, 2004	October 15, 2005
As the battle between Cain and Grey continues, it soon becomes apparent that Cain is too strong for Grey. Joshua tries to reason with Cain, but has no luck. What does Cain really have planned for Grey and the others by coming out to battle Grey himself? And what is Joshua's plan to turn Cain away from evil and the Neo-Shadow Alliance?
47	"Bright Lights, Neon City"; Transliteration: "Mādabyi no Himitsu!" (Japanese: マーダビィの秘密！)	November 22, 2004	October 22, 2005
When the Neo-Shadow Alliance has taken over most of the B-DaWorld, Ms. Karat appears to take Yamato, Terry, Bull, Grey, and Wen to Neon City, which is now surrounded by a wall. Armada reveals to Mie and Liena a stone tablet he found on Meowlantis when it floats and leads them to a ruin under Neon City reuniting them with Yamato. Meanwhile, Enjyu overhears Biarce talking to Marda B. about the B-Energy that would be used on him and Enjyu begins his agenda.
48	"Everybody Wants to Rule the B-DaWorld"; Transliteration: "Daisakusen!! Neon Shiti!!" (Japanese: 大決戦!! ネオンシティ!!)	November 29, 2004	October 29, 2005
With Enjyu now under his control, Marda B. decides to launch an attack on Neon City. Bull and some of the other B-DaPlayers decide to stay and defend the city, but can they be victorious? Meanwhile, Yamato, Terry, Grey, and Wen travel into the cave of darkness searching for the B-DaEnergy that they can use to defeat Marda B., but will they be strong enough to overcome a cat statue?
49	"Into the Neo-Shadow Den"; Transliteration: "Kizuna Yue no Tatakai" (Japanese: 絆ゆえの戦い)	December 6, 2004	October 30, 2005
Yamato and the gang infiltrate Marda B.'s base, but they quickly run into Li leading to a showdown between brothers. Will Wen be able to defeat Li and bring him back to the side of light, or will Wen be trapped in stone like most of his friends?
50	"The Longest B-DaBattle"; Transliteration: "Inochi Tsukiru Made..." (Japanese: 命尽きるまで...)	December 13, 2004	November 5, 2005
Cain reveals that the only reason he's been working for Marda B. is so he can take over the B-DaWorld, and he plans on building a new B-DaWorld after Marda B. finishes destroying the current one. Grey has heard enough though, and so Cain and Grey resume their battle in the Neo Shadow Ship.
51	"B-DaStorm"; Transliteration: "Yūki Aru Ketsudan" (Japanese: 勇気ある決断)	December 20, 2004	November 6, 2005
Biarce reveals that Enjyu has had all of his memories deleted and the only way to restore them is to defeat him in battle. As a result, Terry decides to show his colors by facing off one-on-one with Enjyu while Yamato pursues Biarce. Can Terry free Enjyu, or will he become another victim of Marda B?
52	"In Search of Greatness"; Transliteration: "Aratanaru B – Densetsu (Rejendo)" (Japanese: 新たなるB-伝説(レジェンド）)	December 27, 2004	November 12, 2005
Yamato continues taking on Biarce with the stake of the entire B-DaWorld on the line. Can Yamato find a way to get by the cunning Marda B. and his henchman Biarce, or will Marda B. become the new controller of the B-DaWorld permanently?

== Season 2 (Battle B-Daman: Fire Spirits!) ==
No.	Title	Original release date	English air date
1	"Wishes For The Stars" ("Request of the stars"); Transliteration: "Hoshi ni Negai wo" (Japanese: 星に願いを)	January 10, 2005	February 3, 2007
Yamato embarks on yet another fantastic journey in the B-DaWorld. He wins a Strike Shot in a B-Da Battle. Then a character named Haja tries to steal it from him for his own use, so he challenges him to a B-Da Battle.
2	"Two Boy Crash" ("Crash!"); Transliteration: "Gekitotsu!" (Japanese: 激突!)	January 17, 2005	March 20, 2007
Gannos searches for a Strike Shot and meets Yamato, the birth of a big rivalry begins...
3	"The Great Brave" ("Super Hero"); Transliteration: "Ōinaru Yūsha" (Japanese: 大いなる勇者)	January 24, 2005	March 27, 2007
Grey finds a Strike shot and is challenged by Haja to a B-DaBattle to determine its true owner.
4	"Gold Rush" ("Gold Rush"); Transliteration: "Gōrudo Rasshu" (Japanese: ゴールドラッシュ)	January 31, 2005	April 3, 2007
Terry and Joe team up and start their journey to the Winners Tournament.
5	"Encounters" ("Unknown Encounter"); Transliteration: "Michitonosōgū" (Japanese: 未知との遭遇)	February 7, 2005	April 10, 2007
Bull searches for a Strike Shot on his way to Winners.
6	"Battle Runner" ("Battle Runner"); Transliteration: "Batoru Rannā" (Japanese: バトルランナー)	February 14, 2005	April 17, 2007
Yamato and Gannos battle Terry and Joe on a competition for a strike shot, and the winner is...
7	"The Chuckerout in the Wilderness" ("Wilderness' Bodyguard"); Transliteration: "Kōya no Yōjinbō" (Japanese: 荒野の用心棒)	February 21, 2005	April 24, 2007
Gannos runs into trouble in the village.
8	"The Flame" ("Suddenly Like Fire"); Transliteration: "Totsuzen Honō no Gotoku" (Japanese: 突然炎のごとく)	February 28, 2005	May 1, 2007
Grey trains for the tournament and arrives at an underground B-da battle arena, where he meets Enjyu and both battle.
9	"No Mercy" ("Unforgiveable Things"); Transliteration: "Yurusarezaru Mono" (Japanese: 許されざる者)	March 7, 2005	May 8, 2007
Terry finds a Strike Shot, but Haijya interferes and steals it, he attacks Terry but Joe steps in to defend him at the cost of his life.
10	"Reunion" ("Town of Reopening"); Transliteration: "Saikai no Machi" (Japanese: 再開の街)	March 14, 2005	May 15, 2007
Bull reunites with his old friend Yamato.
11	"Goodbye Friend" ("Farewell, Friend"); Transliteration: "Saraba Tomoyo" (Japanese: さらば友よ)	March 21, 2005	May 22, 2007
A new B-Daman is found.
12	"Count to Three" ("Count of Three"); Transliteration: "Mittsukazoero" (Japanese: 三つ数えろ)	March 28, 2005	July 7, 2007
Yamato and the gang visit Armada.
13	"Whiteout" ("Whiteout"); Transliteration: "Howaito Auto" (Japanese: ホワイトアウト)	April 4, 2005	July 14, 2007
Enjyu faints in his journey and finally makes the discovery for the strike shot he has been searching all along.
14	"Elegy for the Guys" ("Elegy of the Men"); Transliteration: "Otokotachi no Banka" (Japanese: 男たちの挽歌)	April 11, 2005	July 21, 2007
Yamato must battle a confused Terry who wants to steal his strike shot.
15	"Countdown" ("Final Countdown"); Transliteration: "Fainaru Kaunto Daun" (Japanese: ファイナル·カウントダウン)	April 18, 2005	July 28, 2007
It's the final three days before the Winner's Tournament and everybody is preparing for the tournament. Akylus gets an improvement to his newly found Revolver Hades.
16	"The Way to the Dragon" ("Dragon Road"); Transliteration: "Doragon e no Michi" (Japanese: ドラゴンへの道)	April 25, 2005	August 4, 2007
17	"Youth Carnival" ("Carnival of Youth"); Transliteration: "Seishun Kānibaru" (Japanese: 青春カーニバル)	May 2, 2005	August 18, 2007
In this special episodes, profiles are given for the participants in the Winner's Tournament.
18	"The Qualifiers" ("The Winners"); Transliteration: "Shōri-sha-tachi" (Japanese: 勝利者たち)	May 9, 2005	August 25, 2007
A pre-match starts at Winners for the final chance to get a strike shot. Liena and Li along with other players participate, on the match, Liena earns the strike shot and the opportunity to participate at Winners.
19	"Hard to Hit" ("Hard Target"); Transliteration: "Hādotā Getto" (Japanese: ハードターゲット)	May 16, 2005	September 1, 2007
All the B-da players, including Yamato, Gunnos, Grey, Enjyu and Kiba start the battle for A Block.
20	"Hot Shot" ("Hotshot"); Transliteration: "Hotto Shotto" (Japanese: ホットショット)	May 23, 2005	September 4, 2007
B Block winners, including Akyulus, Jinbee, Haja, Wen, Liena and Castillo battle in the game B-da golf battle.
21	"Swallow Tail" ("Swallowtail"); Transliteration: "Suwarō Teiru" (Japanese: スワロウテイル)	May 30, 2005	September 11, 2007
A mysterious bird leads Terry to a strike shot, where he has to learn to fight the weakness of his heart.
22	"Inside the Labyrinth" ("Labyrinth"); Transliteration: "Rabirinsu" (Japanese: ラビリンス)	June 6, 2005	September 18, 2007
Akylus, Enjyu, Haja, Wen and Kiba battle in the Battle Pyramid where incredible warped battles take place. Who will be the two to qualify on to the semi-finals?
23	"Rules to be a Hero" ("The Terms of a Hero"); Transliteration: "Eiyū no Jōken" (Japanese: 英雄の条件)	June 13, 2005	September 25, 2007
Yamato, Gunnos, Grey, Jinbee and Liena play against each other in Battle Royal Hockey. In the battle royale, Jinbee gets quickly kicked out by Liena, and in a one on one match against his sister Grey proves to be the superior Soldier of the Gale. Now only Yamato, Gunnos and Grey remain and only two will qualify, however the match gets interrupted by Haja, will the match stop? Or will the Contestants continue on this epic showdown?
24	"Days of Anger" ("Wilderness of Anger"); Transliteration: "Ikari no Arano" (Japanese: 怒りの荒野)	June 20, 2005	October 2, 2007
Terry finally gets to Winners and challenges Haja with his new B-Daman in a spider match. Now with an improved B-daman and finally a strike shot he battles against the crafty B-da´player, however Haja proves not to be just a coward, but an amazing Bdaplayer, will Terry defeat the Opponent who defeated Joe?
25	"Semi-final" ("Showdown"); Transliteration: "Taiketsu" (Japanese: 対決)	June 27, 2005	October 9, 2007
Yamato and Gunnos battle to qualify for the finals. In an incredible clash of Drive shot vs Metal Shot, who will be able to win?
26	"Glory with Wounds" ("Wounded Glory"); Transliteration: "Kizudarake no Eikō" (Japanese: 傷だらけの栄光)	July 4, 2005	October 16, 2007
Akyulus and Enjyu battle to qualify for the finals. Enjyu fights ferociously to win, but Akyulus proves to be a strange adversary. Will Enjyu be able to pierce through Akyulus and battle Yamato in the final Round? (The dub version gets cancelled after this episode.)
27	"High Noon (Asia only)" ("High Noon"); Transliteration: "Mahiruno Kettō" (Japanese: 真昼の決闘)	July 11, 2005	October 23, 2007
Just before the finals, Bull comes in and taunts Yamato. Yamato vows to defeat Akyulus and the finals match finally begins. In a 3-point Direct-Hit-battle, the winner must win the best of three rounds. Yamato quickly uses his great power, but has trouble against Akyulus almost invisible stealth shot. As the battle progresses Akyulus gradually recovers his memories. Yamato stands in a pinch but manages to turn the tide leaving the game 2 to 2.
28	"Trading Places (Asia only)" ("Trading Places"); Transliteration: "Dai Gyakuten" (Japanese: 大逆転)	July 18, 2005	October 30, 2007
Yamato and Akyulus resume their battle by trading powerful blows. To Shin's amazement, Akyulus old self returns! Now both players decide to use the 100% of their strength. In the ultimate collision of strike shots, Drive shot vs Stealth Shot, by evoking his full B-da spirit... Akyulus emerges victorious. TP reveals his true self with the name of B-daeus, a man who wants to control the B-daworld and with his subordinates they interrupt the Awarding ceremony! Yamato and the entire gang decide to stop them. The battle enrages and Akyulus becomes berserk causing B-daeus to flee with the help of the twins, Fereus and Equus.
29	"The Fugitive (Asia only)" ("The Fugitive"); Transliteration: "Tōbō Sha" (Japanese: 逃亡者)	July 25, 2005	November 6, 2007
Akyulus is one of the legendary b-da players, and according to B-daeus he is the key to gain control of the B-da world. He sends forth his servants to attack Akyulus and seize him and offers Yamato and company to surrender. Both Yamato and Grey refuse to sell Akyulus. Then Bull comes in to show Yamato's and Grey's new ultimate B-damans. Cobalt Blaster and Chrome Harrier.
30	"Wings of Friendship (Asia only)" ("Wings of Friendship"); Transliteration: "Yūjō no Tsubasa" (Japanese: 友情の翼)	August 1, 2005	November 13, 2007
It is revealed that Akyulus true power as a legendary b-da player is to create strike shots with his own energy, and that Bdaeus was after that power. Later Yamato teams up with Akyulus and challenge Grey and Terry to a friendly match. They battle till exhaustion, each deepening their bond as B-daplayers. By having gained new true friends, Akyulus uses his power and a new strike shot is born... The Stealth-Drive Shot.
31	"Spider (Asia only)" ("Spider"); Transliteration: "Supaidā" (Japanese: スパイダー)	August 8, 2005	November 20, 2007
Yamato, Akyulus and the gang are devoted to intensive training. Akyulus however gets exhausted pretty quickly because creating a Strike shot drains his own vital energy. In order to heal his fatigue they decide go to a hot spring. However Bull gets kidnapped and Akyulus is the only one that notices. He goes to search for Bull, and battles against an old partner who is controlled by Bedeus. Akyulus makes short work of him, and when it seems that he has comes into his senses, he tricks Akyulus and traps him in a spider web. Tarantula seizes the chance and kidnaps Akyulus.
32	"End of the World (Asia only)" (End of the World""); Transliteration: "Endo obu za Wārudo" (Japanese: エンド・オブ・ザ・ワールド)	August 15, 2005	November 27, 2007
Shin predicts that Akyulus has been taken to his ancestors ruins. While Bears and Armada work on an improved Bdaman, the gang decides to go and save Akyulus but Grey makes Liena to stay. The gang arrives and have to confront an entire army of Bdaeus servants led by Indica. By spying with a Surveillance camera, Indica is able to track the trayectory of B-daballs and counter effectively against Yamato, Gunnos, Grey and Terry. Liena appears and destroys the surveillance cameras, but Indica defeats her quickly. The entire gang step in to protect Liena but they're powerless by the rest of the army. Suddenly Red haired Enjyu joins the fray with his improved Cartridge system B-daman, Variable Kaiser.
33	"Closed Forests (Asia only)" ("Closed Forests"); Transliteration: "Tozasareta Mori" (Japanese: 閉ざされた森)	August 22, 2005	December 4, 2007
Yamato and the gang continue to search and end up in the middle of a strange forest. The forest seems to be quite a maze and the gang becomes hungry but has to refrain from eating the poisonous mushrooms. Only Terry seems to be able to sense the dangers and troubles as he spots one of B-daeus assassins lurking in the forest.
34	"Caveman (Asia only)" ("Caveman"); Transliteration: "Okashina Okashina Sekki Hito" (Japanese: おかしなおかしな石器人)	August 29, 2005	December 11, 2007
The gang eventually run into Gunno's hometown. When they arrive Gunnos lies about winning the Winners Tournament. The elders of the village congratulate Gunnos and arrange his marriage with Hannah. Gunnos is reluctant, but suddenly it appears that the elder is actually part of Bedeus gang masters in disguise. An army of Bedeus lackeys attack Gunnos and he is quickly defeated in a B-dabattle much to the townspeople demise. It is only when Grey, Terry and Yamato step in to help and they defeat them. Finally Gunnos reveals the truth but promises to really win first place next time.
35	"Twins (Asia only)" ("Twins"); Transliteration: "Tsuinzu" (Japanese: ツインズ)	September 5, 2005	December 18, 2007
A B-da factory where Liena, Armada and Mie are located is destroyed by the twins Ferreus and Equus. They manage to escape barely but the twins insist on making trouble for Yamato and his friends. The twins arrive to where the gang is training and defeat Gunnos and Terry easily with their advanced Cartridge system Bdamans. Yamato, Grey and Shin arrive to the scene and Yamato demands a battle. Grey and Yamato tag team to take them on. However the twins excellent cooperative play turns the tides to their favor, pushing both Cobalt Blaster and Chrome Harrier to the brink of defeat. At the end, however, Grey remembers a promise he had made to Liena and regains his composure. With one of Bull's special reloader part and both strike shots (his sister's hop shot and his speed shot), Grey begins to counter attack. Aided by Yamato's power they defeat both Ferreus and Equus in their own game.
36	"Melody of Betrayal (Asia only)" ("Melody of Betrayal"); Transliteration: "Uragiri no Merodi" (Japanese: 裏切りのメロディ)	September 12, 2005	January 8, 2008
The gang end up in a wild desert full of sandstorms. Haja returns. This time since he was close to dying he says he wants to help Yamato and his gang. It appears then that the gang is surrounded by Jinbee, Phantom, and Veeder. They corner Yamato and pushes him against the wall. The entire gang tries to fight off, but it appears that Haja was actually saved by Bedeus and now serves under him! By showing his true colors, Haja betrays the gang, but the gang manages to barely escape, losing track of Akyulus.
37	"Breaking The Waves (Asia only)" ("Breaking The Waves"); Transliteration: "Kiseki no Umi" (Japanese: 奇跡の海)	September 19, 2005	January 15, 2008
Akyulus begins to suffer internal emotional damage after being forced to create an evil strike shot. Yamato ends up in a sea area with the rest of his friends. They gang is confronted Three Black Roses of Midnight (the trio that was defeated by Kiba during Winners) but now they have improved cartridge system B-damans, and The gang proves to be no match against them. To put things worse, Yamato tries to use the new StealthDrive shot but it breaks Cobalt Blaster. A tide arises and threatens to drown the gang, unless they win. The three roses are about to claim victory, but are intercepted by Wen and Li, also With new and improved cartridge system B-damans. The two brothers show an incomparable team play, proving that 3 isn't necessarily better than 2
38	"Dagon's Close Call (Asia only)" ("Dagon's Close Call"); Transliteration: "Doragon Kikiippatsu!" (Japanese: ドラゴン危機一髪！)	September 26, 2005	January 22, 2008
Yamato and Grey realize that they still lack training. They decide to take some tips from Wen and Li. Eventually Bedeus sends another of his thugs to attack Yamato and Grey while on a suspension bridge, but Wen and Li intervene in their stead. Both of the brothers however experience problems while fighting on a suspension bridge and Li gets injured. The battle seems against the brothers, but they fuse their B-damans and manage to win. B-deus recognizes the brothers as a threat to their plan and orders Haijya to cut loose the suspension bridge as they fall into an abyss. This action enrages Akyulus who suddenly seems to be possessed by feelings of hatred and anger.
39	"Day of Revival (Asia only)" ("Day of Revival"); Transliteration: "Dayo Revuivua" (Japanese: だよfれゔぃゔぁ)	October 3, 2005	January 29, 2008
40	"Bonnie and Clyde (Asia only)" ("Bonnie and Clyde"); Transliteration: "Oretachi ni asu Hanai" (Japanese: 俺たちに明日はない)	October 10, 2005	February 5, 2008
Yamato and the gang manage to infiltrate in Bedeus base in order to rescue Akyulus. Haijya appears with a gigantic cannonball B-daman but Gunnos stays in order to fight him while the rest of the gang go further to reach their friend. Later on Aztec mask appears to fight, but Bull and Kiba stay and battle him. Yamato, Grey and Terry who are accompanied by Shin and Tommy the cat, enter into the cave, and suddenly countless of Soldiers attack the gang, but Terry insists on dealing with them as Grey and Yamato advance. Terry is overpowered by sheer numbers, but in a last attempt manages to defeat everyone before fainting. In the battle against Aztec mask, he easily overpowers Kiba and Bull, but Enjyu joins the fray and battles the mighty B-da player. Meanwhile Yamato and Grey encounter the twins Ferreus and Equus who are trying to prevent them from reaching Akyulus. Grey decides to battle them as he gives an opportunity for Yamato to advance further. Yamato is finally able to reach the end of the lair where he meets Akyulus, but there is something wrong with him?
41	"Howling (Asia only)" ("Howling"); Transliteration: "Hauringu" (Japanese: ハウリング)	October 17, 2005	February 12, 2008
Akyulus seems rather different, he now has long hair and white eyes and begins to howl like a wild beast. Shin immediately recognizes that he is taken over by the evil powers after being forced to create a Dark strike shot. Akyulus goes berserk and begins to shoot at Yamato with his new cartridge B-daman, Gattling Hades. Yamato and his Drive shot prove to be no match against Wild Akyulus and his Dark stealth shot! Yamato refuses to listen to Shin's advice to give up despite being constantly beaten down by a superior Akyulus. Soon Yamato realized all the troubles and sacrifices he and his friends have gone through and decides to counter attack. With an amazing demonstration of constant cartridge shooting, Cobalt Blasters begins to literally heat and turns into Hot-ball mode! Yamato is now able to use the Stealth-Drive shot created once by Akyulus powers and his friendship and is able to overcome the Dark Stealth shot. Akyulus is defeated and he begins to return to his old self.
42	"When Time Ran Out (Asia only)" ("When Time Ran Out"); Transliteration: "Sekai Hōkai no Jokyoku" (Japanese: 世界崩壊の序曲)	October 24, 2005	February 19, 2008
Yamato has rescued Akyulus but Bedeus secret hideout begins to crumble. Yamato and Akyulus quickly run outside as they encounter Grey, Gunnos, Terry and the others. Aztec Mask and Enjyu are evenly match but the Mask Aztec ceases to fight and calls it a draw for the meantime. Everybody cheers as they are finally reunited with Akyulus, but the crumbling hideout results to be a secret flying spaceship! Bedeus reveals that the purpose of why kyulus was kidnap was to force him to create the Ultimate Gaedeaum shot, The ultimate Dark strike shot so powerful that would revive "Lord Galdezer" an Ancient B-da player who had been sealed by Akyulus clan. Galdezer possesses Bedeus body and promises to get revenge on Akyulus as the only survivor of the clan and the entire B-da world. Will Yamato and the gang be able to defeat Bedeus gang and the new powerful Galdezer?
43	"Independence Day (Asia only)" ("Independence Day"); Transliteration: "Independensu Dei" (Japanese: インデペンデンス・デイ)	October 31, 2005	February 26, 2008
In a quick demonstration of his telekinetic powers, Galdezer by controlling his B-daman from afar easily defeats the entire gang! Bedeus and his gang challenges Yamato and his friends to a series of 5 battles in a tournament that will decide the fate of the entire B-da world. Galdezer leaves with Bedeus and the spaceship and Akyulus soon collapses as his body is weak from having created the Dark Stealth shot and the Ultimate Gaedaeum shot. Akyulus apologizes for being taken over by having put the B-da world once again into peril, but Grey, Bull and the rest of the gang promise to support him until the end so that he doesn't have to carry the burden all by himself Akyulus and Shin finally realized that having met Yamato and the others was the best thing that has happened to them, meanwhile they have to prepare for the upcoming battles if they want to keep the B-da world from danger.
44	"We are not Angels (Asia only)" ("We are not Angels"); Transliteration: "Oretachi ha Tenshi Janai" (Japanese: 俺たちは天使じゃない)	November 7, 2005	March 4, 2008
The Air tightens as the First of the Decisive battles is about to start. The team to get 3 victories wins the 5 VS 5 matches. The 1st Round, The Pillar Destruction battle, the first to go on Yamato's Team is Enjyu, while Boss master sends out Hajiya. Enjyu easily overpowers Haijya and destroys most of his pillars in the beginning of the match. Just before he's about to win, Haijya reveals to have Kia kidnapped as a hostage linked to his final pillar. If Enjyu were to destroy it Kia would fall and die. Variable Kaiser's attacks are sealed and Haijya begins to get the upper hand near to winning. Kia shouts in the middle of the crisis and knocks some sense back into Enjyu, just in time for him to use his Black Drive Shot. Enjyu defeats Haijya, and catches Kia as he falls.
45	"Please Give me Wings (Asia only)" ("Please give me Wings"); Transliteration: "Tsubasa wo Kudasai" (Japanese: 翼をください)	November 14, 2005	March 11, 2008
The second match is about to start. From team Fire Spirits, Terry steps in to fight, on the other hand despite Equus claims Bedeus (Master Hefai) chooses Ferreus to battle instead. The second match takes place on the Devil canyon, which is bottomless, where falling would meant an instant loss. The battle ensues and Terry seems to have serious disadvantage. At the end Terry decides not to give up and fights till the end, giving inspiration to his team mates and specially Akyulus. Unfortunately Terry loses the match.
46	"Reviving Ferocious Wolf (Asia only)" ("Reviving Ferocious Wolf"); Transliteration: "Yomigaeru Kinrō" (Japanese: 蘇る金狼)	November 21, 2005	March 18, 2008
The matches are in a tie 1 to 1. Although Ferreus won against Terry, B-daeus punishes her. Equus tries to stop him but is forced to test a new machine instead. Meanwhile, Yamato and his gang are busy training for the next match, but Akyulys emotional damage is still too deep to allow him to fight at full power. Gunnos and others argue that Akyulus is not ready and they should battle to decide who is entitled for the 3rd match. Jinbee shows up and guides the gang to the place for the battle but they are ambushed by B-Deus' members. Outnumberd by B-Deus, they are driven up to the wall but Gunnos and others protect Akyulus, throwing themselves into the battle. To respond them, Akyulys finally makes a stunning comeback!
47	"Brainstorm (Asia only)" ("Brainstorm"); Transliteration: "Bureinsutōmu" (Japanese: ブレインストーム)	November 28, 2005	March 25, 2008
Now back at full potential, Akyulus decides to battle on the next match. The 3rd battle is Akyulus vs Equus on the circular canon stage, but this time Equus seems to operate his B-daman with an advanced brainstorm system which controls the B-daman using his brainwaves. When the battle begins, Akyulus faces problems with the advanced use of the brainstorm and it seems like no b-daplayer can keep up with the speed of the brainstorm, besides it seems to have serious side-effects for the user. Equus begins to suffer the strains from Brainstorm and almost starts to get out of control. Akyulus manages to keep up with the brainstorm system and is able to barely fight at equal footing, but in the end he decides to achieve a long-term victory by using his Stealth shot to miss on purpose and instead of earning his last point to win the match, he attacks the core system of Brainstorm. Equus however is able to land his final point and Akyulus loses the match. Akyulus is upset on having lost such an important match, but knows that by disabling brainstorm it will give Grey and Yamato a better chance to win the following matches.
48	"Gone with The Wind (Asia only)" ("Gone with The Wind"); Transliteration: "Kaze to Tomoni Sarinu" (Japanese: 風と共に去りぬ)	December 5, 2005	April 1, 2008
On the competition Yamato's team has 1 Victory and 2 Losses, one more loss would result in handing the B-da world to Bedeus. Grey decides to fight on the 4th round against the Aztec Mask, in a 3 point Direct Battle on the Hurricane stage. At the beginning, Grey experiences difficulties as the stage wind pressure blows away his B-daballs, Aztec mask on the other hand who focuses on power has no problems on getting through. Grey struggles as he is barely able to dodge, until Bull arrives and with a power up for Chrome Harrier, is able to fight on equal footing. Bedeus realizes to have underestimated Grey, and increases the Wind pressure of the Hurricane stage to its maximum, rendering Chrome Harrier's improved cyclone attacks to be useless. Aztec Mask gets the upper hand once more and with absolute attack power blasts Grey to near defeat. In the last moment sensing his friends feelings, Grey uses all his B-da spirit and summons the wind to fight on his side! The soldier of the gale creates a giant Cyclone and with god-like speed, strikes down Aztec mask and seizes victory! The score is now tied 2 to 2, Grey passes the final task to Yamato who awaits for the final Battle that will decide the fate of the entire B-da World.
49	"Is There tomorrow (Asia only)" ("Is There Tomorrow"); Transliteration: "Ashita Gārusa" (Japanese: 明日があるさ)	December 12, 2005	April 8, 2008
Mie, Armada and Liena decide to take Yamato and the gang go for a picnic to relax before the final match. Yamato seems uneasy now that the entire B-da world is resting on his shoulders. Grey challenges Yamato to a friendly match, which Yamato easily wins, later on Terry challenges him, and then Wen, Li and Kiba. After defeating everybody, Akyulus challenges Yamato and the battle ends in a draw. Yamato realizes that he doesn't need to carry all he burden since his family and every friend are supporting him and have helped him to get this far and vows to win. That night however, Akyulus has a nightmare in which Galdezer defeats Yamato with the Gaedaeum shot. He wakes up and decides to use the last remain of his B-da spirit to create an ultimate strike shot that will fight par on par with the Ultimate Evil Strike shot, despite Shin's many warnings that doing so could mean his death.
50	"Heaven and Hell (Asia only)" ("Heaven and Hell"); Transliteration: "Tengoku to Jigoku" (Japanese: 天国と地獄)	December 19, 2005	April 15, 2008
The final battle finally starts, Yamato vs Galdezzer. The entire gang except for Akyulus go to cheer on Yamato. As the showdown beings, Galdezer shows his true appearance is that of a Dragon! He quickly overpowers Yamato and Cobalt Blaster begins to experience problems. Just as things seem to turn for the worse, Akyulus comes in and hands Yamato a new strike shot "Use it" are his last words, as he passes out... Yamato receives the Strike shot, but not without shedding tears.
51	"Shoot Facing Tomorrow (Asia only)" ("Shoot Facing Tomorrow"); Transliteration: "Asu ni Mukatte te!" (Japanese: 明日に向かって撃て!)	December 26, 2005	April 22, 2008
