= List of Madlax episodes =

DVD box set released by ADV

Madlax (マドラックス, madorakkusu) is a Japanese animated series consisting of 26 episodes. It was first aired on TV Tokyo on April 5, 2004, and concluded on September 27, 2004.

== Episodes ==
No.	Title (Note: Titles taken from the subtitled version by ADV Films)	Original release date
1	"Gun Dance ~dance~" Transliteration: "Jūbu ~dance~" (Japanese: 銃舞 ~dance~)	April 5, 2004
After losing all his comrades, a young Galza resistance fighter attempts to rescue his friends but is captured by Gazth-Sonika troops. However a strange young woman appears out of nowhere, and single-handedly deals with his pursuers, before he can learn her name, he dies from his injuries.
2	"Red Moon ~crimson~" Transliteration: "Kōgetsu ~crimson~" (Japanese: 紅月 ~crimson~)	April 12, 2004
In Nafrece, the absent minded Margaret Burton's life proceeds as usual, however one day when her former tutor Vanessa Rene appears and gives her a present of a pair of red shoes and it causes some lost memories return.
3	"Blue Moon ~moon~" Transliteration: "Sōgetsu ~moon~" (Japanese: 蒼月 ~moon~)	April 19, 2004
Madlax is assigned to assassinate the Gazth-Sonika Commander-in-Chief, Guen McNichol, but the customer is Commander McNichol himself. He is weary of 12 years of pointless civil war which appears to be the work of the Enfant international criminal organization and intelligence network. Madlax visits him the night before the ceremony where he is to give a speech commissioned by the leader, Korslan IV where he confirms his instructions. The next day, Madlax carries out her assignment, however she is seen by officer Limelda Jorg. Meanwhile, Margaret Burton hears the news of the assassination with complete disinterest.
4	"Enticement ~ask~" Transliteration: "Yūwaku ~ask~" (Japanese: 誘惑 ~ask~)	April 26, 2004
Margaret's classmate Anna Moré kills her own father, the politician Piederica Moré, and then jumps from a third floor window. Police investigator, Maclay Marini, is convinced that there is something suspicious about the murder. He finds that data on Anna's computer has been overwritten with the words "elda taluta" pointing to the Enfant organization. He is warned to stop his investigation, and then "awakened" by the words from Firstari "elda taluta" which makes him a servant of Enfant.
5	"Nonpresence ~none~" Transliteration: "Muzai ~none~" (Japanese: 無在 ~none~)	May 3, 2004
Madlax is hired to find some "goods" which someone in Nafrece has sent to the Galza resistance which is also being sought by Enfant. In Gazth-Sonika, Madlax meets a boy from Nafrece, Chris Krana, who has secretly traveled there in the hope of meeting his father, whom he has never seen. He was assisted by Piederica Moré who also asked the boy to investigate the cause of the civil war. Madlax discovers that Chris is the "goods" she has to protect and his father is Min Durk, the leader of the Galza resistance. Carossea Doon arrives in Gazth-Sonika with Lieutenant Limelda Jorg to kill Chris, but Madlax stops them and Chris continues on to meet his father. However when he arrives, Chris encounters Friday Monday who explains to him that his father doesn't exist and, that Min Durk was just a red herring created by Enfant, and that Chris is the result of a "distortion" twelve years ago.
6	"Dying Wish ~leave~" Transliteration: "Yuigon ~leave~" (Japanese: 遺言 ~leave~)	May 10, 2004
Elenore reports to Margaret's progress to her doctor on, and mentions that Margaret found a book which interests her. Margaret meets Chiara who invites her to a soirée, meanwhile Vanessa mentions to Elenore she recalls 12 years ago when the airplane that Margaret was on disappeared, and she returned home with total amnesia. At the soirée, Maurice Lopez introduces himself, and declares his interest in her, especially after he sees her picture book. However, Elenore arrives with Vanessa and she effectively beats him up.
7	"Picture Book ~nature~" Transliteration: "Ehon ~nature~" (Japanese: 繪本 ~nature~)	May 17, 2004
At Vanessa's suggestion, Margaret hires Eric Gillain, a bibliodetective, to find another copy of her "picture book". After questioning a linguist, she identifies the language as Elies, from Gazth-Sonika. He travels to Gazth-Sonika where he is met by Madlax who has been hired to protect him. Meanwhile, Friday Monday receives copies of the book pages and recognizes it as Secondari, a forbidden book lost 12 years ago.
8	"Soul Words ~soul~" Transliteration: "Kongen ~soul~" (Japanese: 魂言 ~soul~)	May 24, 2004
Madlax takes Gillian into the combat zone of Gazth-Sonika, where they seek someone who can allegedly read Elies Script. They meet Lady Quanzitta Marison who calls the language the "holy words of Sauron". She leads him to a cavern with walls covered in Ellies script and she reads the words "elda taluta". When he repeats those Words of Awakening he sees a vision of Laetitia and remembers an episode of his past where he shot three men who had raped and murdered his sister. Unable to live with this guilt, Gillain gives Madlax a letter to Margaret saying he can no longer search for the book and throws himself off a cliff.
9	"Scent Left Behind ~scent~" Transliteration: "Zankō ~scent~" (Japanese: 残香 ~scent~)	May 31, 2004
Vanessa takes Margaret and Elenore away for a weekend at the luxury Allium Hotel and they meet Luciano when their car breaks down. Luciano, an old friend and colleague of Madlax from Gazth-Sonika, has been hired to assassinate Carossea Doon who is also staying at the hotel organizing weapons shipments to Gazth-Sonika via Bookwald Industries. Luciano again encounters Margaret who strangely makes him feel at peace. When he is about to shoot Carossea, Margaret spoils his shot and he misses, and he is then shot dead by Limelda.
10	"Infiltration ~dive~" Transliteration: "Shinshoku ~dive~" (Japanese: 侵触 ~dive~)	June 7, 2004
Intrigued by the unintentionally overheard conversation at Allium Hotel, Vanessa search the Bookwald Industries' database for any company involvement in the Gazth-Sonikan war or with Enfant, but the official data appears suspiciously impeccable. She asks an old acquaintance and hacker Badgis for help. Meanwhile, Carossea investigates Vanessa as he searches for the Secondari, companion to Firstari book held by Friday Monday. Badgis uses his supercomputer to hack into Bookwald's system, however the infiltration is detected by Friday Monday and Badgis only manages to download a portion of the information to a terminal in Gazth-Sonika before terminating the connection. Vanessa travels to the war-torn country to retrieve the data.
11	"Foreign Nation ~object~" Transliteration: "Ikoku ~object~" (Japanese: 異国 ~object~)	June 14, 2004
In Gazth-Sonikan, Vanessa tracks down the computer on which Badgis saved the retrieved data and Madlax is engaged to protect her. Vanessa finds the computer belongs to a teenager, and she manages to download the data, however they are confronted by three Enfant agents. Madlax kills them and departs with Vanessa, however they are watched by Carossea, who kills his Enfant contact and reports that Madlax is the hacker.
12	"Vanished Will ~close~" Transliteration: "Shoui ~close~" (Japanese: 消意 ~close~)	June 21, 2004
Carossea tells Friday Monday that Madlax is the hacker and he sends Limelda after her, but he appears to have his own agenda. Vanessa intends to go public with the data she discovered, although Madlax finds such recklessness dangerous, suggesting that she will be killed before she can do it. During the night, Madlax seeks out Limelda and they confront each other at a cafe. Madlax tells Limelda that she was the one who stole the data, making her Enfant's target instead of Vanessa, however their encounter results in a shootout where Madlax is slightly wounded. Meanwhile, Carossea flies back to Nafrece and approaches Margaret, planning to retrieve the Secondari book himself.
13	"Cry of Awakening ~awake~" Transliteration: "Kakumei ~awake~" (Japanese: 覚鳴 ~awake~)	June 28, 2004
In Nafrece, Carrossea Doon approaches Margaret about Secondari book which he says is entitled "Sarks Sark" and is written in Elies script. He looks through the book and notices a page missing and sees his own blood splatters on some pages which trigger his memories. He tries to piece together the connection between Margaret, Vanessa and Madlax. Miss Nakhl visits Margaret during the night to steal the book, but Margaret stops her. In Gazth-Sonika, Vanessa notices that Madlax has a page of a book with illustrations and Elies script, but Madlax cannot read it. Later, Vanessa manages to unlock the stolen data, but it is a trap set by Enfant, and the screen just repeats the words "elda taluta".
14	"Forgotten Thoughts ~memory~" Transliteration: "Bōsō ~memory~" (Japanese: 忘想 ~memory~)	July 5, 2004
After reading the words "elda taluta", Madlax appears to lose her memory. Meanwhile, in Nafrece, Carrossea warns Margaret that her book is being sought by unknown forces. He encounters Nakhl for the first time and he realizes that they are both competing for Margaret's book. Nakhl senses that both Margaret and Carrossea have the "Gift". Meanwhile, Madlax absent mindedly wanders the streets at night and Vanessa goes after her. The encounter Limelda who realizes that Madlax is no longer the same person. As Vanessa and Limelda prepare to shoot each other, Madlax's fear triggers memories of her combat training and she disarms Limelda.
15	"False War ~camouflage~" Transliteration: "Gisou ~camouflage~" (Japanese: 偽争 ~camouflage~)	July 12, 2004
Limelda reports the events in Gazth-Sonika to Carrossea who realizes that Madlax overcame the "elda taluta" programming. When he reports to Friday Monday, his boss tells him that he knows Vanessa stole the data. Meanwhile, Madlax triggers the Enfant trap again in an effort to regain her memories and finds herself in the ruins of a war zone. She sees Laetitia running with her rag doll, then sees her father walking off in the distance. At the same time in Nafrece, Margaret collapses, and when she awakes, she has memories similar to those of Madlax. Later, the real data downloaded by Badgis displays on screen, revealing Enfant's control of the Gazth-Sonika civil war.
16	"The Timbre of Gunshots ~moment~" Transliteration: "Jūin ~moment~" (Japanese: 銃韻 ~moment~)	July 19, 2004
Madlax recalls situations which support Vanessa's theory that Enfant controls the Gazth-Sonika civil war. Madlax and SSS find a publisher prepared to release Vanessa's data but Madlax and Vanessa are captured by Enfant's agents and shot with tranquilizers. While unconscious, Madlax returns to the ruins of a war zone where she meets Friday Monday whom she recognizes as Enfant. In her vision, Madlax comes under attack from Enfant's forces, but she manages to defeat them with assistance from Vanessa.
17	"Killing Moment ~reunion~" Transliteration: "Setsuna ~reunion~" (Japanese: 刹那 ~reunion~)	July 26, 2004
Vanessa and Madlax manage to escape, but Enfant frames them for murdering a member of the royal family. When Margaret hears news that Vanessa is wanted for murder, she travels to Galza with Elenore and Carrossea Doon coincidentally is on the same flight. Vanessa and Madlax are eventually captured by Gazth-Sonika troops, however Limelda intervenes and saves them. Madlax gives Limelda the data to convince her that Enfant is behind the civil war.
18	"Two Separated ~duo~" Transliteration: "Sōri ~duo~" (Japanese: 双離 ~duo~)	August 2, 2004
Limelda tries to cope with the realization that what she has believed all her life is a lie. While Vanessa learns to shoot, Madlax searches for information about her past through the history of Gazth-Sonika, and encounters Nakhl in the library. Nakhl warns Madlax to stop her quest for information about Gazth-Sonika and the Elies script, but she refuses. They begin a deadly cat-and-mouse game and Madlax realizes that she has met her match. However, Margaret arrives with Elenore and they break the impasse. Margaret and Madlax meet for the first time watched by Nakhl who reports back to Quanzitta Marison.
19	"Targeted Book ~holy~" Transliteration: "Ehon ~holy~" (Japanese: 獲本 ~holy~)	August 9, 2004
Fighting their way through all cordons and front lines, Madlax takes Margaret, Elenore and Vanessa to the site where Eric Gillain found the cavern walls covered in Ellies script. They are assisted by Nakhl who takes them to Quanzitta Marison who has the third book, Thirstari, and reveals that whoever has all three books can open the door to the other place which holds the key to events of the past. Quanzitta offers to give Thristari to Margaret and show her the doorway if she can obtain the first book. Meanwhile in Nafrece, Carrossea Doon confronts Friday Monday, demanding the Firstari. He shoots his master then takes the book.
20	"True War ~wish~" Transliteration: "Shinsō ~wish~" (Japanese: 真争 ~wish~)	August 16, 2004
Quanzitta Marison reveals that twelve years ago, Friday Monday brought the three books together and opened the doorway which led to the Gazth-Sonika civil war. Madlax asks Quanzitta if she can look at Thristari and as she does, Margaret reads Secondari, and they both experience a time in the past where Madlax shot her father to save Margaret. Limelda finds Quanzitta's village and attempts to shoot Madlax who is saved by Nakhl. Madlax and Limelda hunt each other through the jungle, but when they confront each other, Vanessa interrupts them and Limelda badly wounds Madlax. Meanwhile, Carrossea appears and tells Margaret that his aims are not the same as Enfant's, and that he is also searching for his lost memories of 12 years ago.
21	"Cruel Confession ~guilty~" Transliteration: "Kokuhaku ~guilty~" (Japanese: 告薄 ~guilty~)	August 30, 2004
With the three Holy Books brought together, Margaret utters the mystic words of Awakening, Essence and Truth; "Elda Taluta", "Sarks Sark" and "Ark Arks", and prepares enters the Door of Truth with Carrossea. Laetitia says not to enter, however Carrossea does so, and finds himself on an airplane twelve years ago when Friday Monday opened the doorway and a created a disturbance which caused the plane to crash. He and a young girl were the only survivors, caught in a war zone. They see Richard Burton, code name Madlax, and Friday Monday confronting each other. Burton shoots Monday, but the boy is also shot, his blood falling on the pages of Monday's open book. Suddenly Carrossea begins to bleed from a wound in his chest, and realizes that he was killed trying to save Margaret all those years ago, and he dies next to Margaret. Friday Monday then takes possession of the three books.
22	"Violent Feelings ~rage~" Transliteration: "Gekijō ~rage~" (Japanese: 撃情 ~rage~)	August 30, 2004
Although Friday Monday has the three books, Margaret and Laetitia advise him that he cannot implement his plan because one book has a page missing. Meanwhile, Madlax surprisingly recovers quickly from her bullet wound and she feels a bond between her and Margaret. She leads Vanessa and Elenore towards Margaret while Madlax drops back to deal with Limelda who is following them. Madlax initially stops Limelda, but she follows on and kills Vanessa who tries to protect Madlax. Margaret happens on the scene while under Friday Monday's control, and shoots Madlax, believing that she killed Vanessa.
23	"Lost Hearts ~doubt~" Transliteration: "Meishin ~doubt~" (Japanese: 迷心 ~doubt~)	September 6, 2004
Madlax again recovers with the help of Nakhl and goes after Friday Monday to save Margaret who is under his control, calling him "father". She travels with Elenore through a battle zone with heavy fighting, where Madlax displays her consummate fighting skills.
24	"Devoted Heart ~hearts~" Transliteration: "Kenshin ~hearts~" (Japanese: 献心 ~hearts~)	September 13, 2004
Madlax, "the woman who cannot die", pushes on ahead to save Margaret Burton. She again encounters Limelda and they duel but do not kill each other and Madlax asks Limelda to follow her. Meanwhile, Elenore follows Madlax, and is critically wounded but she arrives there first. Although Margaret does not initially recognize Elenore, she eventually she does, but Elenore dies from her wounds.
25	"Sacred Blood ~saint~" Transliteration: "Seiketsu ~saint~" (Japanese: 聖血 ~saint~)	September 20, 2004
Madlax confronts Monday about his actions and prepares to shoot him, but Margaret, still under his control shoot Madlax dead and Monday seizes the missing page of the Secondari book. With the three complete books together, the Door of Truth reappears. Monday and Margaret pass through the doorway and re-live the events of twelve years earlier, including the confrontation between Monday and her father. At the time, Monday uttered the mystic words of Awakening, Essence and Truth causing Burton to first shoot Carrossea and attempt to shoot Margaret, but she splits into two bodies and one of them shoots and kills him, the last words they remember being his code name Madlax. However, because of the trauma of killing her father, Margaret sealed off those memories. Monday now again utters the uttered the mystic words and chaos and violence again erupt in Gazth-Sonika. Suddenly Madlax reappears and shoots Monday whose body disappears.
26	"Broken Shards ~pupil~" Transliteration: "Kakera ~pupil~" (Japanese: 欠片 ~pupil~)	September 27, 2004
Madlax explains that she is a shard of Margaret's heart, born of the desire to save herself but not kill her father. Margaret split into two and also created the Laetitia persona from her doll at the same time. The Absolute Truth lies before Margaret, and she eventually decides to accept the truth and she, Madlax and Leatitia become one person again. Monday reappears at the Door of Truth, and Margaret shoots him. Monday then reappears back in his headquarters where Madlax bursts in and reveals that she is Margaret. She kills him, and as flames engulf his headquarters Quanzitta consigns his existence to history. Margaret Burton, the girl who has the Gift. Opens the Door of the Era and decides to give Madlax her own existence, and takes Laetitia as her sister. Madlax goes back to her previous profession, but this time with Limelda as her companion.
