= List of Harukanaru Toki no Naka de Hachiyō Shō episodes =

Harukanaru Toki no Naka de - Hachiyō Shō (遙かなる時空の中で 〜八葉抄〜) is an anime series and PlayStation 2 romantic adventure video game developed by Ruby Party and published by Koei. Both media are based on the first game in the series, Harukanaru Toki no Naka de. The PlayStation 2 game is an enhanced remake of the original game.

This page deals with the episodes from the television series.

== Series overview ==
Twenty-six original episodes, plus eight omake endings and an animated movie have so far been produced for the Harukanaru Toki no Naka de original characters. Based loosely on the manga of the same name, the animated series follows the adventures of Motomiya Akane in Heian Kyou as she tries to help the ordinary people fight against the powerful Oni clan who seek dominance over the city once and for all.

The series is split into vague arcs which also appear in the manga, although often in a slightly different manner. The arcs are as follows:

>Akane arriving in Kyou and her hunt for the other Hachiyou. This arc concludes at Episode Thirteen with the location of the final Hachiyou, Tachibana no Tomomasa and the successful rescue of Morimura Tenma's younger sister, Ran, from the Oni clan's clutches.
>Akane and her Hachiyou hunting for the four seals in order to regain the power of the four Gods that the Oni Clan currently have spirited away. This arc ends at the close of Episode Twenty Six and marks the end of the series proper.

Though the ending is conclusive in terms of the plot, it is not conclusive in terms of who Akane chooses in relation to the Hachiyou. In keeping with the Neoromance theme, eight endings were produced: "Eisen", "Inori", "Shimon Morimura", "Fujiwara no Takamichi", "Tenma Morimura", "Tachibana no Tomomasa", "Abe no Seimei", and "Minamoto no Yorihisa" were produced, one for each Hachiyou, and added as extra features on the final Japanese DVD release. These endings allowed viewers to choose for themselves which of the Hachiyou, if any, Akane would select to be with at the close of the story.

Since the production of the series, a movie adaptation, Harukanaru Toki no Naka de - Maihitoyo (遙かなる時空の中で 〜舞一夜〜), has been released in Japan. This movie features the same characters and basic canon as the animated series, but cannot be seen as a sequel because during it Akane is still trying to work out to what good use she can put her Ryuujin-given powers, and the story appears to have been set during Akane's fight with the Oni clan. The film introduces the new character Oono Suefumi, who does not appear in any of the animated episodes.

== Episodes ==
The twenty-six episode anime series has been licensed by Bandai Visual and will be released in a series of nine volumes under the title HARUKA: Beyond the Stream of Time – A Tale of the Eight Guardians. A new volume will be released monthly with the first volume being released April 22, 2008, and the final volume due January 13, 2009.

No.	Title	Original release date
1	"It is Thee, Priestess of the Dragon God"; Transliteration: "Nanji, Ryūjin no Miko" (Japanese: 汝、龍神の神子)	October 5, 2004
Akane Motomiya, together with her friends Tenma Morimura and Shimon Nagareyama, are suddenly abducted by an unknown masked man and the three are carried to place known as Kyou, similar to Heian era Kyoto. Akane meets the masked man who tells her that she is the Priestess of the Dragon God. Princess Fuji, the last descendant of the Star Clan, requests Akane's aid in using the power of the Dragon God to save her people from the Oni clan. Scared and feeling alone, Akane runs off and releases the power of the Dragon God only to be saved my Yorihisa, a guard of Princess Fuji, and Shimon. The sign of the Hachiyo awakens in both of them marking them as guardians.
2	"The Capital, Invaded by Demons"; Transliteration: "Oni ni Miirareshi Mono" (Japanese: 鬼に魅入られし京)	October 12, 2004
Still wondering what has happened to Tenma, Akane goes off to find him but encounters the masked man instead who tells her his reason for wanting her power. On a side note, Tenma encounters a young man named Inori who tells him about vengeful spirits. Akane is then found by Yorihisa who tries to take her back to the palace. Refusing to go along with him until she finds Tenma, Akane begs him to release her just as Tenma passes by. Thinking she is being kidnapped, Tenma faces off against Yorihisa and awakens his power as a Hachiyo.
3	"The Sorcerer"; Transliteration: "Onmyōji" (Japanese: 陰陽師)	October 19, 2004
When Akane loses consciousness due to a fever, her soul goes to the place where she last met the masked man. She encounters an Onmyouji named Yatsauki and a corpse obsessed with her beauty. Yatsauki destroys the corpse and cures Akane's mysterious fever. Akane awakens to see everyone by her side and wonders whether everything was just a dream. Meanwhile, Yatsauki who apparently lost all of his compassion to become an onyoujii stares at the hand where Akane's teardrop hit him and it turns into a gem that marks him as a guardian.
4	"The Flower Purifying Ceremony"; Transliteration: "Hana-shizume" (Japanese: はなしずめ)	October 26, 2004
Akane is forced to wear an extravagant outfit just to meet the general of the emperor which turns out to just be Tomomasa. Struck by how beautiful Akane is, Tenma nearly confesses his love for Akane. The Hachiyou and Akane are assigned a job to purify the red tainted cherry blossoms, if the petals fall, disastrous event will occur. While purifying the tree the masked man shows up and speeds the process of the red petals falling. The petals which become demons attacked the humans. Akane's determination purifies the petals. And she catches a glimpse of the masked man's face before holding a shard of his broken mask and crying.
5	"The Dewdrop Lodge"; Transliteration: "Tsuyu no Yadori" (Japanese: 露の宿り)	November 2, 2004
After purifying the tree, Akane thinks deeply about the demon who injured Yorihisa and how he could do such a thing. Tenma tries to comfort her and almost confesses his love for her again but fails again. Akane falls into the river because of Yorihisa and Tenma's quarrels. Akane laughs at their troubled faces.
6	"The Vice Minister and Imperial Palace Demon"; Transliteration: "Jibu Shōjō to Dairi no Oni" (Japanese: 治部少丞と内裏の鬼)	November 9, 2004
Akane attends a party at the palace, where there will a dancing girl who is able to seduce people. When she loses her way to the party, she meets Takamichi and overhears a plot to kill the Emperor. Before she can warn anyone, Akane is caught and locked up, realizing that a demon was behind the plot, though she is rescued by Takamichi. Takamichi becomes a Hachiyou.
7	"The Night Cry of the Nue"; Transliteration: "Nue no Naku Yoru" (Japanese: 鵺の哭く夜)	November 16, 2004
Yorihisa is reunited with an old friend, a nue that Yorihisa had tried many times to defeat in his youth but failed each time. When the nue captures Akane, Yorihisa must choose between freeing his old friend that had helped him grow stronger from the demon's curse or forfeit Akane's life.
8	"The Flame of Demon Hatred"; Transliteration: "Oni Nikumishi Homura" (Japanese: 鬼憎みし焔)	November 23, 2004
Inori, a hot-headed young man, despises Oni because of a past incident involving his sister. He becomes a Hachiyo of fire when he saves Akane from an oni. He can't accept Shimon because of his demon-like appearances.
9	"The Eight-Stringed Harp (Part 1) - Tune of Enchantment"; Transliteration: "Ayashi no Shirabe: Hachigenkin Zenpen" (Japanese: 妖しの調べ 八絃琴 前編)	November 30, 2004
A monk dies because of playing an eight-stringed koto, but his soul still dwells within the instrument and plays it. Meanwhile, an Oni places a sleeping curse on Akane through the vengeful spirit, forcing the Hachiyo to go and look at the monk's cursed eight-stringed koto and remove the additional string that was added to it to break the demon's curse. The Oni who created the kin was captured.
10	"The Eight-Stringed Harp (Part 2) - Ripples of the Falling Flower"; Transliteration: "Sange no Hamon: Hachigenkin Kōhen" (Japanese: 散華の波紋 八絃琴 後編)	December 7, 2004
To break the sleeping curse on Akane, the Hachiyo must play the cursed eight-stringed koto to determine which string was added. However, playing the koto may result in their deaths and the solution is found when Eisen, the seventh Hachiyo to reveal himself appears.
11	"The Cursed Priestess"; Transliteration: "Norowareta Miko" (Japanese: 呪われた神子)	December 14, 2004
When a mysterious girl proclaims herself to be the Priestess of the Dragon God, Akane and Tenma investigate and learn that the girl is Tenma's younger sister, Ran. However, Ran does not recognize Tenma as her brother and has apparently joined the Oni Clan. When Akane awakens from a nightmare and finds dead butterflies under her quilt, Yasuaki reveals that she is cursed and will die the following night.
12	"Demon Lurking Darkness"; Transliteration: "Oni Hisomu Yami" (Japanese: 鬼ひそむ闇)	December 21, 2004
Yasuaki successfully removes the curse from Akane, but the curse returns to its sender, Ran. When Tenma finds his sister, she is taken by Akuram, who promises to return Ran in exchange for Akane. When Akane learns of offer, she gives herself up, despite Tenma's attempts to stop her. All Hachiyou go to save Akane.
13	"Release Your Heart"; Transliteration: "Kokoro, Tokihanate" (Japanese: 心、解き放て)	December 28, 2004
Akuram attempts to summon a dragon and take Akane's power as the Priestess of the Dragon God while the Hachiyo continue to search for Akane. Meanwhile, Akane manages to free Ran from the control of the Oni Clan. General Tomomasa becomes a Hachiyou and akrame controls the 4 gods and order them to destroy kyou. however, since all of the hachiyo have been found, ayane uses her powers combined with the hachiyo's powers and restores them to their statues in the wall.they return to kyou after tenma slashes akram with an anti-demon sword.
14	"The Rainbow Prophecy"; Transliteration: "Niji Tsugeshi Mirai" (Japanese: 虹告げし未来)	January 4, 2005
A white rainbow appears to cut through the sun and everyone is afraid thinking that is a bad omen. Akane, Yoshimura and Yasuaki stay at another estate. A messenger comes to Akane and tells her that a war will break out between demons and the people of kyou and that ayane and the hachiyo must stop the war.
15	"Heart beyond Hate"; Transliteration: "Nikushimi o Koeru Kokoro" (Japanese: 憎しみを越える心)	January 11, 2005
Shimon befriends a demon, Sefuru. Sefuru thinks that Shimon is a demon and befriends him. When Sefuru realizes that Shimon is living at Princess Fuji's palace, he becomes jealous of the special treatment that Shimon gets as a demon. He later spies on him to see that Shimon is in an alliance with Akane and he thinks up a plan to use him to lure Akane out. Sefuru's plan leads to the people of Kyou hunting down Shimon. After inori (who believes shimon is a demon) witnesses shimon hurting a child (sefuru actually hurts the child but because he is hiding the people of kyou think shimon did it). inori takes the child from shimon and runs to ayane to remove the impurity. ayane then goes to where shimon is and sefuru attacks her, shimon and yorihisa. shimon wishes to become friends with sefuru again but sefuru thinks shimon has deceived him. shimon wishes from the gaps between them to disappear and uses his earth powers to defeat the onryo.
16	"The Day of Atonement"; Transliteration: "Shokuzai no Hi" (Japanese: 贖罪の日)	January 18, 2005
Yorihisa and Tenma are tested by the Guardian of the Eastern Seal to see if they are worthy to call themselves Hachiyou and receive the seal. Yorihisa uses his memory of his brave, dead brother to accomplish this mission.
17	"The Oleander Lady"; Transliteration: "Kyōchikutō no Hito" (Japanese: 夾竹桃の女)	January 25, 2005
Takamichi tries to find a guardian seal and falls into the trap of a demon woman. Tomomasa comes and rescues him by using his charm to outwit the demon woman. Takamichi and Tomomasa deepen their friendship which started first by discontent.
18	"The Chamberlain and Maiden Akane"; Transliteration: "Shii no Jijū to Akane-hime" (Japanese: 四位の侍従と茜姫)	February 1, 2005
Akane meets a girl who looks exactly like her and has the same name as she does except the girl is a princess. She finds out that Princess Akane cannot marry her true love so Akane-miko and the Hachiyou decide to help Princess Akane and her love.
19	"Unstoppable Feelings"; Transliteration: "Tomerarenu Omoi" (Japanese: 止められぬ想い)	February 8, 2005
A curse is placed upon Kyou and Eisen removes the curse with his Hachiyou power aided with the love he has for Akane.
20	"The Light Endowed by a Lady"; Transliteration: "Anata ni Sazukarishi Hikari" (Japanese: 貴女に授かりし光)	February 15, 2005
Shirin stole the spirit of Takamichi's mother and sealed it in an Onryo. Takamichi must choose between freeing his mother and staying loyal to his duty as a Hachiyou.
21	"Demons and People"; Transliteration: "Oni to Hito" (Japanese: 鬼と人)	February 22, 2005
Inori refuses to accept the relationship between Seri and Akuram's right-hand man. Akane tries to help Inori understand his sister's feelings and at the end he must prove worthy of the seal.
22	"When Demons Appear"; Transliteration: "Oni Izuru Toki" (Japanese: 鬼出づる時)	March 1, 2005
Yasuaki regains Ran's memory. Ran feels guilty and makes Akane anxious. After Ran and Akane's last friendly laugh, Ran is taken by Akram.
23	"Dusk"; Transliteration: "Kawatare" (Japanese: かわたれ)	March 8, 2005
The master of Yasuaki once told him that he was born to find a person important to him. Yasuaki doesn't understand but when he thinks about the Akane, he understands about what his master told him. Akane learns that Yasuaki is a created person but she comforts him. They save Eisen and receive the seal.
24	"The Released Four Gods"; Transliteration: "Hanatareta Shishin" (Japanese: 放たれた四神)	March 15, 2005
The Hachiyou plan to restore the stolen seals. They plan to do this without Akane for her safety.
25	"The Parting of the Clouds"; Transliteration: "Amagumo no Wakare" (Japanese: 天雲の別れ)	March 22, 2005
The Hachiyo restored all seals except one. Akane collapsed while praying for the safety of the Hachiyo.
26	"Into the Distance, into Your Heart"; Transliteration: "Haruka, Kimi no Moto e..." (Japanese: 遙か、君のもとへ･･･)	March 29, 2005
It is now the final fight between the Ryuujin no miko and Akuram. The Hachiyou along with Akane find a way to defeat Akuram. Ultimately, she returns to her own world along with Shimon, Ran, and Tenma while the rest live happily in their own time.
