= List of Legendz episodes =

This is a list of episodes of the anime series Legendz.

== Episode listing ==
No.	Title	Original release date
1	Transliteration: "oira ga kaze o yondeita" (Japanese: オイラが風を呼んでいた)	April 4, 2004
2	Transliteration: "atama no naka wa karakkaze" (Japanese: 頭の中はカラッ風)	April 11, 2004
3	Transliteration: "kani ni osoware awa kutta" (Japanese: カニに襲われアワくった)	April 18, 2004
4	Transliteration: "wani ga wani shite wani to yara" (Japanese: ワニがワニしてワニとやら)	April 25, 2004
5	Transliteration: "tori ga koi shite zukkyun bakkyun" (Japanese: 鳥が恋してズッキュンバッキュン)	May 2, 2004
6	Transliteration: "shinobikondara dokomademo" (Japanese: 忍び込んだらどこまでも)	May 9, 2004
7	Transliteration: "maibebibebibarabara" (Japanese: まいべびべびばらばら)	May 16, 2004
8	Transliteration: "atsui no atsui no atsui no yo" (Japanese: 熱いの熱いの熱いのよ)	May 23, 2004
9	Transliteration: "neko-tarashii yatsu, mukatsuku nyan" (Japanese: ネコたらしいヤツ、ムカつくニャン)	May 30, 2004
10	Transliteration: "hanase ba nagāi monogatari" (Japanese: 話せば長～い物語)	June 6, 2004
11	Transliteration: "sushi kutte kyūkyoku-tte yeiyei!" (Japanese: スシくって究極ってイエイイエイ！)	June 13, 2004
12	Transliteration: "tako tako hamatte sā taihen" (Japanese: タコタコハマってさぁ大変)	June 20, 2004
13	Transliteration: "chikyū no himei ga kikoeteta" (Japanese: 地球の悲鳴が聞こえてた)	June 27, 2004
14	Transliteration: "nani ga dōshite dōnaruno!?" (Japanese: 何がどうして どうなるの!?)	July 4, 2004
15	Transliteration: "kotae wa kaze ga shitteita" (Japanese: 答えは風が知っていた)	July 11, 2004
16	Transliteration: "nantarukotoka chichi shuyaku...?!" (Japanese: なんたることか父主役…?!)	July 18, 2004
17	Transliteration: "chōshi no haguruma gattagata" (Japanese: 調子の歯車ガッタガタ)	August 1, 2004
18	Transliteration: "zonbi wansaka betatsuki moyō" (Japanese: ゾンビわんさかベタつき模様)	August 8, 2004
19	Transliteration: "yoru wo koetara asa datta" (Japanese: 夜をこえたら朝だった)	August 15, 2004
20	Transliteration: "saisho de, saigo no, dēto desu" (Japanese: 最初で、最後の、デートです)	August 22, 2004
21	Transliteration: "nezuccho, chubiruba hashi no hashi" (Japanese: ねずっちょ、ちゅびるば橋のはし)	August 29, 2004
22	Transliteration: "G to W de nikkoru-chubōn" (Japanese: GとWでニッコルチュボーン)	September 5, 2004
23	Transliteration: "kimi to miageta yoru no sora" (Japanese: 君と見上げた夜の空)	September 12, 2004
24	Transliteration: "uhyoho dekitayo tarisudamu" (Japanese: ウヒョホできたよタリスダム)	September 19, 2004
25	Transliteration: "mukashi no sāga ga dete kimasu" (Japanese: 昔のサーガが出て来ます)	September 26, 2004
26	Transliteration: "kimochi achikochi sukueā" (Japanese: 気持ちアチコチスクエア～)	October 3, 2004
27	Transliteration: "tsuini kokomade yattekita" (Japanese: ついにここまでやって来た)	October 10, 2004
28	Transliteration: "kaze ga hakonda meguriai" (Japanese: 風がはこんだめぐり逢い)	October 17, 2004
29	Transliteration: "zujere to utaō rejenzu-kurabu" (Japanese: ズジェレと歌おう レジェンズクラブ)	October 24, 2004
30	Transliteration: "rekishi wo kaeta ai no uta" (Japanese: 歴史をかえた愛の歌)	October 31, 2004
31	Transliteration: "oikākete, tobasarēte" (Japanese: 追いかーけて、飛ばされーて)	November 7, 2004
32	Transliteration: "seishun. nekketsu. serenāde" (Japanese: 青春・熱血・セレナーデ)	November 14, 2004
33	Transliteration: "garion garirure gārikku" (Japanese: ガリオン ガリルレ ガーリック)	November 21, 2004
34	Transliteration: "mō tto sanbiki ushi ga kita" (Japanese: モォ～っと三匹ウシが来た)	November 28, 2004
35	Transliteration: "rasuto ni bikkari CEO!" (Japanese: ラストにビッカリCEO！)	December 5, 2004
36	Transliteration: "chichi yo anata wa erakatta" (Japanese: 父よあなたはえらかった)	December 12, 2004
37	Transliteration: "kono sora someta no dare nanosa!" (Japanese: この空染めたのダレなのさ！)	December 19, 2004
38	Transliteration: "kaze ga dōnimo tomatteta" (Japanese: 風がどうにも止まってた)	December 26, 2004
39	Transliteration: "haruka ga kita michi mō ichido" (Japanese: ハルカが来た道もう一度)	January 9, 2005
40	Transliteration: "masshiron ni moe tsukita" (Japanese: 真っシロンに燃えつきた)	January 16, 2005
41	Transliteration: "kaze ga machi kara kieta tosa" (Japanese: 風が街から消えたとさ)	January 23, 2005
42	Transliteration: "kaze yo, oira ni fuite kina!" (Japanese: 風よ、オイラに吹いて来な！)	January 30, 2005
43	Transliteration: "mō, dōnimo tomaranai!" (Japanese: もう、どうにも止まらない！)	February 6, 2005
44	Transliteration: "ippō sono koro, ore-tachi no tabi" (Japanese: 一方その頃、俺たちの旅)	February 13, 2005
45	Transliteration: "oyoide tonde mawatte... ett?" (Japanese: 泳いで飛んで回って…えっ？)	February 20, 2005
46	Transliteration: "nokosareta hito, yottoide" (Japanese: 残された人、よっといで)	February 27, 2005
47	Transliteration: "rejenzu wō ga wow wow wow wow" (Japanese: レジェンズウォーがうぉううぉううぉううぉう)	March 6, 2005
48	Transliteration: "ima kita kono michi modoryanse" (Japanese: 今来たこの道戻りゃんせ)	March 13, 2005
49	Transliteration: "hikari no tsukkomi iretaro-ka!" (Japanese: 光のツッコミ入れたろか！)	March 20, 2005
50	Transliteration: "kaze to tomo ni satta tosa" (Japanese: 風と共に去ったとさ)	March 27, 2005
