= Natalie Venetia Belcon =

American actress

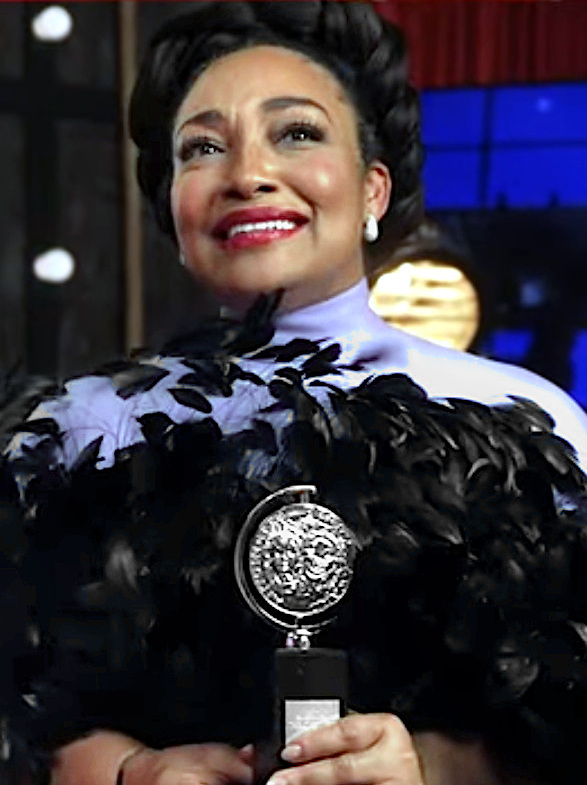
- Belcon at 78th Tony Awards 2025
- Born: Trinidad
- Education: Carnegie Mellon University (BFA)
- Occupations: Actress, singer
- Years active: 1991–present

Natalie Venetia Belcon is an American actress and singer. She is best known for originating the role of former child television star Gary Coleman in the Tony Award-winning Broadway musical Avenue Q and her performance as Omara in Buena Vista Social Club, for which she won the 2025 Tony Award for Best Featured Actress in a Musical. Her Broadway credits also include Joanne Jefferson in Rent, and Matilda the Musical.

== Early years ==
Belcon was born in Trinidad and grew up in the Bronx. Her father was a jazz trumpeter of Venezuelan and Spanish heritage, and her mother, who studied classical piano at the Juilliard School of Music, is Trinidadian.

She is a 1991 graduate of Carnegie Mellon University.

== Theater ==
Belcon has performed on the original cast recordings of Avenue Q, The Glorious Ones and The Bubbly Black Girl Sheds Her Chameleon Skin.

She appeared as Columbina in the world premiere of the musical The Glorious Ones (based on the novel of the same name by Francine Prose) at the Pittsburgh Public Theater in April 2007. She appeared Off-Broadway in the same role later in 2007, in which a reviewer commented that her "seductive presence is matched by her smoky voice."

Belcon has performed in various productions and workshops of The Last Smoker in America, an original 4 character musical by Bill Russell and Peter Melnick, which received its world premiere at CATCO in Columbus, Ohio. A workshop production was previously presented in the 2009 New York Musical Theatre Festival. The Last Smoker in America began performances Off-Broadway at the Westside Theatre on July 11, 2012 and closed in September 2012. She was in Matilda the Musical on Broadway at the Shubert Theatre as Mrs Phelps, replacing Karen Aldridge.

In March 2025, she opened the Broadway production of Buena Vista Social Club playing Cuban singer and dancer Omara Portuondo. For her performance, she won the Tony Award for Best Featured Actress in a Musical.

== Television ==
Belcon appeared as an HR Rep in Damages. Before this she was seen in Johnny and the Sprites until its end with her Avenue Q co-star, John Tartaglia. She plays Gwen, the neighbor of Tartaglia's character, Johnny T.

Belcon had recurring roles on the television shows The Education of Max Bickford, Beverly Hills, 90210 and Roc. Her most notable guest star appearance came in an episode of The Fresh Prince of Bel-Air, as JoAnn Morgan. She also guest starred in episodes of Martin, Living Single, and The Cosby Show.

== Stage ==
Year	Title	Role	Venue	Ref.
2000	The Bubbly Black Girl Sheds Her Chameleon Skin	Emily/Nilda/Sandra	Playwrights Horizons, Off-Broadway	
2001	Rent	Joanne Jefferson	Nederlander Theatre, Broadway	
2003	Avenue Q	Gary Coleman	John Golden Theatre, Broadway	
2007	The Glorious Ones	Columbina	Mitzi E. Newhouse Theater, Off-Broadway	
2009	Wicked	Madame Morrible	2nd U.S. National Tour	
2009	10 Things to Do Before I Die	Vida	McGinn-Cazale Theatre, Off-Broadway	
2012	The Last Smoker in America	Phyllis	Westside Theatre, Off-Broadway	
2013	Matilda the Musical	Mrs. Phelps	Shubert Theatre, Broadway	
2022	Knoxville	Jessie Follet	Asolo Repertory Theatre, Regional, World Premiere	
2023	Buena Vista Social Club	Omara	Atlantic Theatre Company, Off-Broadway	
2025	Buena Vista Social Club	Omara	Gerald Schoenfeld Theatre, Broadway	

== Awards and nominations ==
Year	Award	Category	Work	Result	Ref.
2024	Lucille Lortel Awards	Outstanding Lead Performer in a Musical	Buena Vista Social Club	Won	
2024	Drama Desk Awards	Outstanding Featured Performance in a Musical	Buena Vista Social Club	Nominated	
2025	Drama League Awards	Distinguished Performance	Buena Vista Social Club	Nominated	
2025	Tony Awards	Best Featured Actress in a Musical	Buena Vista Social Club	Won	
