= The Last Smoker in America =

American musical

The Last Smoker in America is a four-character, one-act musical comedy featuring book and lyrics by Bill Russell and music by Peter Melnick. The Last Smoker in America opened Off-Broadway at the Westside Theatre in 2012, after developmental readings in 2005 at the Rubicon Theatre Company, a workshop production at the New York Musical Theatre Festival in 2009, and having its world premiere at Contemporary American Theatre Company (CATCO), Columbus, Ohio in 2010.

== Production history ==
=== Development ===
The show began its development at the Rubicon Theatre Company in Ventura, California in December 2005. The Last Smoker in America was part of an evening of readings of three one-act musicals by Russell (who had written Side Show) and Melnick, directed by Sheryl Kaller. Following the initial workshops at The Rubicon, two additional readings, produced by Andy Sandberg were presented in New York in the fall of 2006 at the York Theatre and the spring of 2008 at New World Stages.

Following additional readings, The Last Smoker in America received a workshop production as a part of The New York Musical Theatre Festival (NYMF) in October 2009. The NYMF production sold out and received an extension of one month prior to its first performance.

The Last Smoker in America scheduled its pre-New York engagement at Contemporary American Theatre Company (CATCO) in Columbus, Ohio for the fall of 2010. This production was co-produced by CATCO and Sandberg. In anticipation of the Ohio run, an industry reading was held in May 2010. Following the reading, it was announced that producer Andy Sandberg, who had co-directed the reading, would assume sole directorial duties of the production as well.

The Last Smoker in America began preview performances on September 29, 2010 at the Vern Riffe Center in Columbus, Ohio. The official opening was on October 6, 2010. Due to strong sales and positive reviews, the show added additional performances to its run. The final performance of the CATCO run was held on October 24, 2010.

=== Cast history ===
CATCO (World Premiere Cast)

- Katy Blake – Pam
- John Bolton – Ernie
- Natalie Venetia Belcon – Phyllis
- Teddy Toye – Jimmy

NYMF (Workshop Cast)

- Felicia Finley – Pam
- Marcus Neville – Ernie
- Natalie Venetia Belcon – Phyllis
- Alex Wyse – Jimmy
- Alice Ripley – Voice of ASPHYXIA

=== Reading casts ===
- 2010 Industry Reading – Adinah Alexander (Pam), John Bolton (Ernie), Natalie Venetia Belcon (Phyllis), Paul Iacono (Jimmy), Christina Bianco (Voice of ASPHYXIA)
- 2008 Reading – Rachel de Benedet (Pam), Malcolm Gets (Ernie), Natalie Venetia Belcon (Phyllis), Paul Iacono (Jimmy)
- 2006 Reading – York Theatre Company Rachel de Benedet (Joyce), David McDonald (Ernie), Francesca Harper (Phyllis), Paul Iacono (Jimmy)
- 2005 Reading – Rubicon Theatre Company Alice Ripley, David McDonald, Julie Dixon Jackson and Nick Cearley.

=== Off-Broadway ===
On June 11, 2012 full cast and creative team for the production was announced. The show opened Off-Broadway at The Westside Theatre on July 11, 2012 (previews) and officially on August 2, 2012. The cast includes Farah Alvin, Natalie Venetia Belcon, John Bolton, and Jake Boyd. Again directed by Sandberg, the production features choreography by AC Ciulla. Other members of the creative team include Fred Lassen (music supervision), Charles Corcoran (sets), Michael McDonald (costumes), Jeff Croiter and Grant Yeager (lights) and Bart Fasbender (sound). The show closed on September 1, 2012.

== Synopsis ==
In a world where smoking has recently been outlawed and the penalties are growing stricter by the minute, Pam is having an impossible time trying to quit. Her husband Ernie dreams of being a rock star and relentlessly practices his guitar in the basement, while their videogame-addicted son Jimmy listens to so much rap music he thinks he's black. As if Pam isn't pushed to the edge of reason already, her nosy, anti-smoking zealot neighbor Phyllis is on a mission to catch transgressors mid-puff. Will Pam kick the habit or fight for her right to light up?

== See also ==
- The Last Smoker
