= Salmonella Men on Planet Porno =

- First edition
- Author: Yasutaka Tsutsui
- Translator: Andrew Driver
- Language: English translation of Japanese
- Genre: Short stories
- Publisher: Alma Books
- Publication date: September 2006
- Media type: Print (paperback)
- Pages: 252 pp
- ISBN: 1-84688-016-5
- OCLC: 68772629

Salmonella Men on Planet Porno (2006) is a collection of short stories by Japanese science fiction and metafiction writer Yasutaka Tsutsui, in English translation by Andrew Driver. Not to be confused with the original Japanese collection ポルノ惑星のサルモネラ人間 (Poruno Wakusei no Sarumonera Ningen), these stories have been selected from a number of works written by Yasutaka Tsutsui.

First published by Alma Books in the UK, a US edition was produced by Pantheon Books (Random House) in November 2008.

== Stories in the collection ==
- The Dabba Dabba Tree
- Rumours About Me
- Don't Laugh
- Farmer Airlines
- Bear's Wood Main Line
- The Very Edge of Happiness
- Commuter Army
- Hello, Hello, Hello!
- The World is Tilting
- Bravo Herr Mozart!
- The Last Smoker
- Bad for the Heart
- Salmonella Men on Planet Porno

Rumours About Me was reproduced in the US literary magazine Zoetrope in its Summer 2008 issue.

A radio dramatisation of The Last Smoker was broadcast on the UK's BBC Radio 4 on 20 February 2009.

A radio dramatisation of the title story, "Salmonella Men on Planet Porno", was broadcast on BBC Radio 3 on 28 February 2009.
