= CATCO =

CATCO may refer to:

- The Contemporary Theatre of Ohio, formerly known as the Contemporary American Theatre Company (CATCO), a regional professional theatre company in Columbus, Ohio, United States
- Calgary Alternative Transportation Co-operative, see List of cooperatives
- Crowley All Terrain Corp, a division of Crowley Maritime
