= Bill Russell (lyricist) =

American librettist and lyricist (born 1949)

Bill Russell (born 1949) is an American librettist and lyricist. Among his stage musicals are Elegies for Angels, Punks and Raging Queens and Side Show, which was nominated for the Tony Award as Best Musical.

== Career ==
Russell's first produced musical was Fortune, which ran Off-Broadway at the Actors' Playhouse from April 27, 1980 to November 23, 1980. Ronald Melrose wrote the music, with Russell writing the book and lyrics. The musical director and arranger was Janet Hood; the two went on to write several musicals together. The musical concerned four performers who were headed for stardom. According to The New York Times reviewer, John Corry, it "marked the maturity of the gay musical", and he commended the "literate" lyrics.

Russell wrote the book and lyrics for the song cycle Elegies for Angels, Punks and Raging Queens, with music by Janet Hood, which originally ran Off-Off-Broadway in 1990 and in the West End in 1993. It played a benefit concert in 2001.

He wrote the book and lyrics for the musical Pageant with Frank Kelly; the music was by Albert Evans, and the conception was by Robert Longbottom. The musical, which featured an all-male cast playing beauty queens premiered Off-Broadway at the Blue Angel in 1991, and subsequently ran Off-Broadway at New World Stages in 2013, as well as having engagements in London (2000) and Australia.

He wrote the concert adaptation of the musical Call Me Madam for the New York City Center Encores! staged concert series, which was presented in February 1995 and starred Tyne Daly.

Russell wrote the book and lyrics for the musical Side Show (music by Henry Krieger), which ran on Broadway in 1997.

He wrote the book and lyrics for the musical Up in The Air, with music by Henry Krieger, conceived and directed by Amon Miyamoto. It premiered at the Kennedy Center in February 2008. The musical was suggested by a Japanese story, about Boonah, the tree-climbing frog.

He wrote the lyrics and book with Jeffrey Hatcher for the musical Lucky Duck, with music by Henry Krieger. It premiered Off-Broadway at the New Victory Theater in March 2012. The musical started where the fairy tale "The Ugly Duckling" ended, "showing what happens once one becomes beautiful." It had premiered at TheatreWorks, Palo Alto, California, in 2000, then titled Everything's Ducky.

He wrote the book and lyrics for the musical The Last Smoker in America, with music by Peter Melnick. The musical opened Off-Broadway in August 2012.

Russell and Janet Hood teamed up again to write the musical Unexpected Joy, which received private readings in March 2012. The musical was the story of four women and was directed by Sheryl Kaller. It ran off-Broadway from April 2018 through May 2018.

He wrote the lyrics for the musical Has Anyone Seen My Mind?, which received industry readings on October 26 through October 27, 2023. The musical opened on November 3rd, 2025, and ran for 3 more performances on November 10, November 17, and November 24, 2025.

== Honors and awards ==
Russell received a 1998 Tony nomination for Side Show for Best Book and shared a nomination with composer Henry Krieger for Best Score. The show was nominated as Best Musical.

Everything's Ducky received the Will Glickman Award for Best New Play (in the San Francisco Bay Area) in 2001 and Garland Awards (presented by "Backstage West") for Best Score, Set and Costumes. He has also received two Commendation Awards from the Gilman & Gonzalez-Falla Theatre Foundation (one in 2000). He received an honorary degree of doctor of humane letters from Morningside College in 2003, and from the Boston Conservatory in May 2007.

== Personal ==
Russell was born in Deadwood, South Dakota and raised in Spearfish, South Dakota. His grandparents were cattle ranchers. He attended Morningside College, Sioux City, Iowa for two years with a major in theater before transferring to the University of Kansas. He came out in an interview with the Rapid City Journal. He married Bruce Bossard in 2009, and they had been a couple for 30 years before that.
