= Me and the Sky (Come from Away) =

Song by Jenn Colella
- Genre: Musical
- Length: 4:33
- Songwriters: Irene Sankoff and David Hein

"Me and the Sky" is a song from the musical Come from Away that focuses on the journey of Beverley Bass, a female pilot who was ordered to land in Gander, Newfoundland and Labrador, Canada, during the September 11 attacks.

== History ==
A decade after the September 11 attack, Bass attended the Gander commemoration ceremony. At the ceremony, she was approached by two songwriters, Irene Sankoff and David Hein, who wanted to interview her. In order to make the musical Come from Away, they asked Bass about her journey in becoming the first female captain for American Airlines. During this 4 hour interview, the writers gathered her stories that later helped to shape the musical; some of her statements later became the lyrics to "Me and the Sky".

The song was first heard at Sheridan College, in Ontario, where Come from Away had a studio production.

== Music and lyrics ==
The song's style is common to musical theatre with its soaring chorus and lyrics telling of wanted fulfillment and of overcoming obstacles. However, the song is not all happy as it also reminds audience members of the shock of the 9/11 attacks and how it changed peoples' lives and dreams in an instant. The lyrics in the song were developed from Bass' interview with the writers. The lyrics speak of her dream to fly as a child, the obstacles she faced as a woman wanting to become a pilot in the mid-20th century, and the pain she felt when planes became weapons on September 11. The highs of the choruses follow her achievements while a quiet tone follows her reaction and experience of the attack.

"Me and the Sky" is sung in the original Broadway production by Jenn Colella, who chose to sing the song a key above the original to raise the excitement of the piece. Colella wanted to portray Bass properly. She started by imagining the emotion Bass felt when one of her friends and co-workers perished in the September 11 attacks, yet she needed to maintain the calm demeanor Bass gave off when leading her own flight crew and passengers. The actor has even been credited with mimicking Bass' normal hand gestures to fully portray Bass. Bass felt that the way Colella portrayed her was very accurate. Bass said that "what I love about watching Jenn play my role is that she acts exactly the way I act. She's just so in charge. That's how it had to be for me, being a female pilot on one of the biggest airplanes in the sky. You had to show them who the boss is or you cannot maintain people's respect." For her performance, Colella landed a nomination for a Tony Award for Best Performance by an Actress in a Featured Role in a Musical. She was also awarded the Drama Desk Award for Outstanding Featured Actress in a Musical in 2017 for her performance.

The structure of Come from Away does not allow for an applause break at the end of the song. However, audiences would still applaud during the middle of the song when it speaks about Bass breaking the glass ceiling. Her story of breaking through the glass ceiling has radiated to various women in the audiences and the cast. Bass has said it is her favorite moment of the show.

== Choreography ==
The choreography of "Me and the Sky" is simple but effective, consisting only of the female ensemble and incorporating chairs and tables, much like the rest of the musical. It starts with the pilot character Beverly sitting in a chair by a table. The other female members of the ensemble also sit in chairs backstage in the shadows. On the line "1986 the first female American captain in history" the background ensemble begins clapping and rise from their seats, starting from the middle of the stage and going outward. Beverly remains seated while the ensemble moves to a table in the middle of the stage and puts on flight attendant caps. On the line "suddenly no one is saying 'Stay grounded'", Beverly rises from her chair and moves to center stage. The next verse consists of the ensemble walking into formations on Beverly's sides. In the final verse that describes the events of 9/11, the ensemble return to their seats, and remove their caps. Beverly walks to her chair and the cast sits in unison. The song is then finished in the chairs.
