= Lucky Guy (musical) =

- Music: Willard Beckham
- Lyrics: Willard Beckham
- Book: Willard Beckham
- Productions: 2011 Off-Broadway; 2020 Center for Theater Arts

Lucky Guy is a musical comedy written and directed by Willard Beckham. The piece tells the story of Billy Ray Jackson, a young musician from Oklahoma who wins a songwriting contest and is invited to Nashville to record his song. He becomes the target of the used-car dealer Big Al Wright and the fading star Miss Jeannie Jeannine (the "Queen of Country Music"), who want to steal Billy Ray's song and use it to revitalize Jeannie's career.

The show premiered on May 19, 2011, Off-Broadway at the Little Shubert Theatre, for a planned run through July 24 but closed after just ten days. The cast included Kyle Dean Massey (as Billy Ray Jackson), Leslie Jordan (Big Al Wright), Varla Jean Merman (Miss Jeannie Jeannine), Jenn Colella (Chicky Lay), Jim Newman (G. C. Wright), and Savannah Wise (Wanda Clark). A new production of the show was put on by the Center For Theater Arts, a performing arts school in the Pittsburgh, PA area in 2020. Willard Beckham worked with the executive director of the school, Billy Hartung, to make the show more suitable for a very large high-school age cast.
