= Yasutaka Tsutsui =

Japanese writer (born 1934)

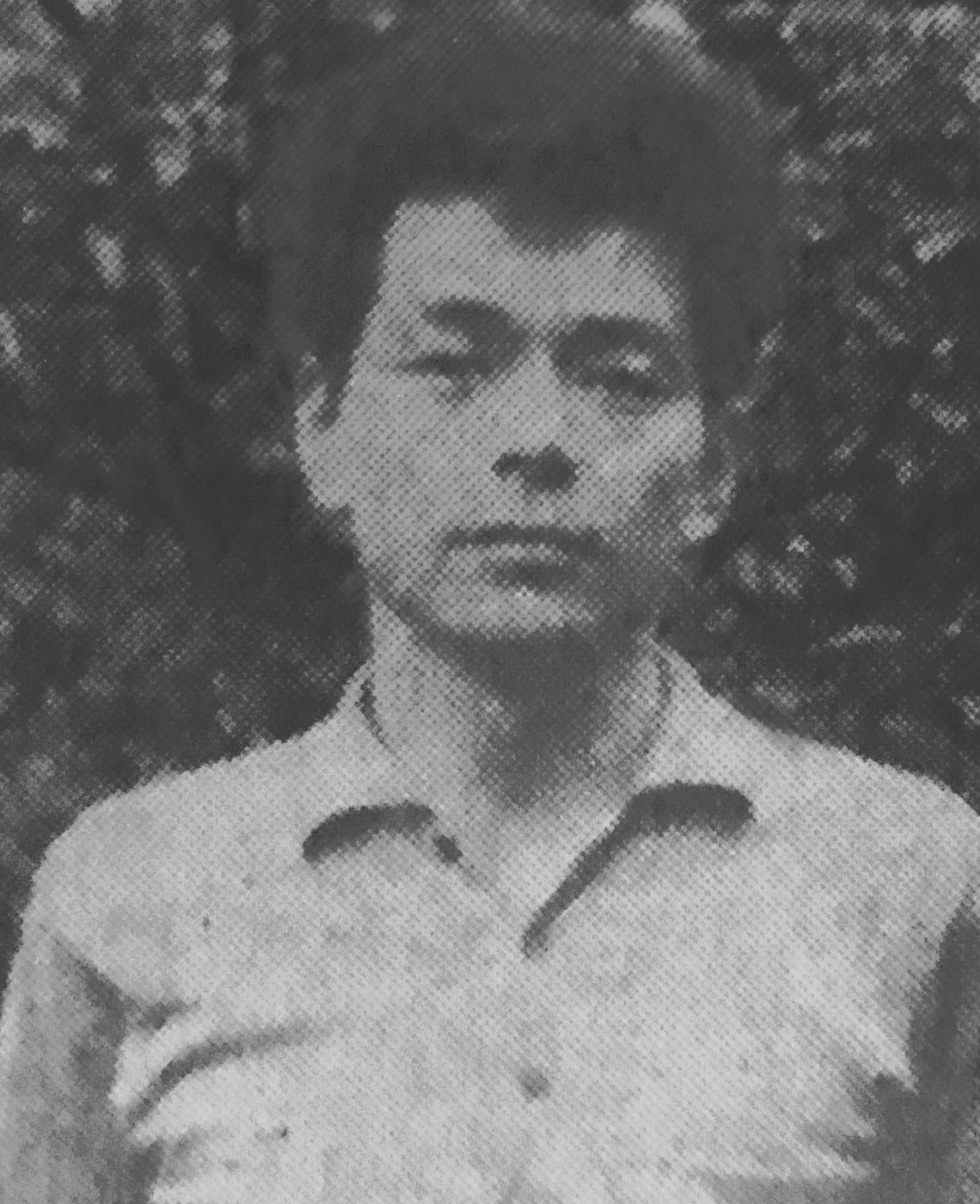
- Tsutsui in 1964
- Born: September 24, 1934 (age 92); Osaka, Japan
- Occupation: Author
- Writing career
- Genre: Science fiction
- Notable works: The Girl Who Leapt Through Time; Gaspard in the Morning; Paprika
- Notable awards: 1987 Tanizaki Prize for Yumenokizaka bunkiten 1992 Nihon SF Taisho Award

Yasutaka Tsutsui (筒井 康隆, Tsutsui Yasutaka; born September 24, 1934 in Osaka) is a Japanese novelist, science fiction author, and actor. His Yumenokizaka bunkiten won the Tanizaki Prize in 1987. He has also won the 1981 Izumi Kyoka award, the 1989 Kawabata Yasunari award, and the 1992 Nihon SF Taisho Award.

== Biography ==
Born at Senba (船場, traditional name of central Osaka area), Osaka in 1934, Tsutsui is a son of zoologist Yoshitaka Tsutsui. In his elementary school days, his IQ was 187, thereby he got education for genius child. Tsutsui graduated from the department of literature, Doshisha University, where he had great interesting in Freudian psychology and theater. He joined the theater troupe Aoneko-za and performed on stage. After working at an industrial design company, he founded and managed the Null-Studio, commercial design company. In 1960, Tsutsui published the sci-fi coterie magazine NULL with his brothers etc. Edogawa Ranpo evaluated his short story Otasuke, which appeared in the NULL, and Tsutsui debuted in magazine Hoseki by this story. Tsutsui wrote short short stories in the Hoseki, S-F Magazine, and Kagaku Asahi etc.

== Writing style ==
His work is known for its dark humor and satirical content. He has often satirized Japanese taboos such as disabilities and the Tenno system, and has been subject to much criticism as a result. His works are seen as the basis for Japan's postmodern science-fiction. Features of his work include psychoanalysis and surrealism, which were themes of his 1957 master's thesis. He has dealt with themes such as time-travel in The Girl Who Leapt Through Time (1965), a massively multiplayer online game's virtual world in Gaspard in the Morning (1992), and dream worlds in Paprika (1993).

== Awards ==
- 1962 Fine Entry in the second Hayakawa SF Contest for Muki Sekai e (無機世界へ)
- 1970-08 Seiun Award for Reichōrui Minami e (霊長類南へ)
- 1971-08 Seiun Award for Vitamin (ビタミン)
- 1974-08 Seiun Award for Nihon igai Zenbu Chinbotsu (日本以外全部沈没)
- 1975-08 Seiun Award for Ore no Chi wa Tanin no Chi (おれの血は他人の血)
- 1976-08 Seiun Award for Nanase Futatabi (七瀬ふたたび)
- 1977-08 Seiun Award for Metamorphoses Guntō (メタモルフォセス群島)
- 1981-10 Izumi Kyōka Prize for Literature for Kyojin-tachi (虚人たち)
- 1987 Tanizaki_Prize for Yumenoki-zaka Bunkiten (夢の木坂分岐点)
- 1989-04 Kawabata Kōsei Prize (ja) for Yoppa-dani eno Kōka (ヨッパ谷への降下)
- 1992-10 Nihon SF Taisho Award for Asa no Gaspard (朝のガスパール)
- 2000-02 Yomiuri Prize for Watashi no Grandpa (わたしのグランパ)
- 2010-10 Kikuchi Kan Prize for the 50th Anniversary of Literature activities
- 2017-01 Mainichi Arts Prize (ja) for Monade no Ryōiki (モナドの領域)
- 2019-07 Seiun Award for Tsutsui Yasutaka, Jisaku o Kataru (筒井康隆、自作を語る)
- 2022-03 Japan Art Academy Prize (ja)

=== Distinction ===
- 1997 Ordre des Arts et des Lettres (Chevalier)
- 2002 Medal of Honor, Purple ribbon (紺綬褒章)
- 2024 Member of Japan Art Academy

== English translations ==
- The novel What the Maid saw, translated by Adam Kabat, was published by Kodansha America Inc. (USA) in 1990, and again by Alma Books (UK) as The Maid in 2010.
- Salmonella Men on Planet Porno, a collection of short stories translated by Andrew Driver, was published by Alma Books (UK) in October 2006 and again by Pantheon Books (USA) in 2008.
- The novel Hell, translated by Evan Emswiler, was published by Alma Books in October 2007.
- The novel Paprika, translated by Andrew Driver, was published by Alma Books in April 2009 and again by Vintage Contemporaries (USA) in 2013. A new English translation by Helen O'Horan was published by Orion Books as part of the SF Masterworks series in October 2026.
- The novella The Girl Who Leapt Through Time, translated by David Karashima, was published by Alma Books in April 2011.
- The Bullseye! collection of short stories, translated by Andrew Driver, was published in July 2017 by Kurodahan Press.

== Works ==
Besides numerous film and TV acting credits, Yasutaka Tsutsui has published dozens of novels and short story collections, and records in Japan.

=== Series ===
Nanase Trilogy

- 家族八景 Kazoku Hakkei (Eight Family Scenes/What The Maid Saw) (1972)
- 七瀬ふたたび Nanase Futatabi (Nanase Once More) (1975)
- エディプスの恋人 Edipusu no Koibito (Oedipus’ Lover) (1977)

=== Novels ===
- 48億の妄想 48 Oku no Mōsō (4.8 Billion Delusions) (1965)
- 馬の首風雲録 Umanokubi Fuunroku (Chronicle of the Horse’s Head Crisis) (1967)
- 時をかける少女 Toki o Kakeru Shōjo (The Girl Who Leapt Through Time) (1967)
- 霊長類、南へ Reichōrui, Minami-e (1969)
- 緑魔の町 Ryokuma no Machi (Green Devil Town) (1970)
- 脱走と追跡のサンバ Dassō to Tsuiseki no Samba (Samba of Running and Chasing) (1971)
- 俗物図鑑 Zokubutsu Zukan (Picture Book of Vulgarity) (1972)
- 男たちのかいた絵 Otoko Tachi no Kaita E (Tale of Two Men) (1974)
- 俺の血は他人の血 Ore no Chi wa Tanin no Chi (My Blood is the Blood of Another) (1974)
- 富豪刑事 Fugō Keiji (Millionaire Detective) (1978)
- 大いなる助走 Oi Naru Josō (The Great Approachway) (1979)
- 美藝公 Bigeikō (1981)
- 虚人たち Kyojin Tachi (Virtual Men) (1981)
- 虚航船団 Kyokō Sendan (Fleet of Fantasy) (1984)
- イリヤ・ムウロメツ Ilya Muromets (1985)
- 旅のラゴス Tabi no Ragosu (Lagos on a Journey) (1986)
- 歌と饒舌の戦記 Uta to Jōzetsu no Senki (War Chronicles of Song and Loquacity) (1987)
- 夢の木坂分岐点 Yumenokizaka Bunkiten (Dreamtree Hill Junction) (1987)
- 驚愕の広野 Kyōgaku no Kōya (Prairie of Astonishment) (1988)
- 新日本探偵社報告書控 Shin-Nihon Tanteisha Hōkokusho Hikae (Copies of the Shin-Nihon Detective Company Reports) (1988)
- フェミニズム殺人事件 Feminizumu Satsujin Jiken (The Feminism Murders) (1989)
- 残像に口紅を Zanzō ni Kuchibeni o (Lipstick on an After-Image) (1989)
- 文学部唯野教授 Bungakubu Tadano Kyōju (Prof. Tadano of the Literature Department) (1990)
- ロートレック荘事件 Rōtorekku-Sō Jiken (The Lautrec Villa Murders) (1990)
- 朝のガスパール Asa no Gasupāru (Gaspard in the Morning) (1992)
- パプリカ Paprika (1993)
- 邪眼鳥 Jaganchō (1997)
- 敵 Teki (Enemy) (1998)
- わたしのグランパ Watashi no Guranpa (My Grandpa) (1999)
- 恐怖 Kyōfu (Fear) (2001)
- 愛のひだりがわ Ai no Hidarigawa (The Left Side of Love) (2002)
- ヘル Hell (2003)
- 銀齢の果て Ginrei no Hate (End of the Silver Age) (2006)
- 巨船べラスレトラス Kyosen Berasu Retorasu (The Big Ship Bellas Letras) (2007)
- ダンシング・ヴァニティ Dancing Vanity (2008)
- ビアンカ・オーバースタディ Bianca Overstudy (2012)
- 聖痕 Seikon (Stigmata) (2013)
- モナドの領域 Monado no Ryōiki (The Monad Realm) (2015)

=== Short stories (collections) ===
- 東海道戦争 Tōkaidō Sensō (The Tōkaidō War) (1965)
- ベトナム観光公社 Betonamu Kankō Kōsha (Vietnam Tourist Bureau) (1967)
- アルファルファ作戦 Arufarufa Sakusen (The Alfalfa Strategy) (1968)
- 幻想の未来・アフリカの血 Gensō no Mirai/Afurika no Chi (Fantasy Future/African Blood) (1968)
- にぎやかな未来 Nigiyaka na Mirai (A Bright Future) (1968)
- アフリカの爆弾 Afurika no Bakudan (African Bomb) (1968)
- 筒井順慶 Tsutsui Junkei (1969)
- わが良き狼 Waga Yoki Ōkami (My Good Old Wolf) (1969)
- 心狸学・社怪学 Shinrigaku, Shakaigaku (Psychology, Sociology) (1969)
- ホンキイ・トンク Honky Tonk (1969)
- 欠陥大百科 Kekkan Ōhyakka (Encyclopedia of Defects) (1970)
- 母子像 Boshizō (Mother and Child Portrait) (1970)
- 馬は土曜に蒼ざめる Uma wa Doyō ni Aozameru (Horses Turn Pale on Saturdays) (1970)
- 発作的作品群 Hossa-teki Sakuhingun (Spasmodic Group of Works) (1971)
- 日本列島七曲り Nihon Rettō Nanamagari (Eight Bends on the Japanese Archipelago) (1971)
- 将軍が目覚めた時 Shōgun ga Mezameta Toki (When the Shogun Awoke) (1972)
- 農協月へ行く Nōkyō Tsuki-e Iku (Co-op Goes To The Moon) (1973)
- 暗黒世界のオデッセイ Ankoku Sekai no Odessei (Dark World Odyssey) (1974)
- おれに関する噂 Ore-ni Kansuru Uwasa (Rumours About Me) (1974)
- ウィークエンドシャフル Weekend Shuffle (1974)
- 笑うな Warau-na (Don’t Laugh) (1975)
- メタモルフォセス群島 Metamorufosesu Guntō (Metamorphosis Archipelago) (1976)
- あるいは酒でいっぱいの海 Aruiwa Sake de Ippai no Umi (Or a Sea Full of Sake) (1977)
- バブリング創世記 Baburingu Sōseiki (Babbling Creation Chronicles) (1978)
- 宇宙衛生博覧会 Uchū Eisei Hakurankai (Universal Hygiene Expo) (1979)
- エロチック街道 Erochikku Kaidō (Erotic Avenue) (1981)
- 串刺し教授 Kushizashi Kyōju (Professor on a Skewer) (1985)
- くたばれPTA Kutabare PTA (Go To Hell, PTA) (1986)
- お助け Otasuke (The Helper) (1986)
- 原始人 Genshijin (Primitive Man) (1987)
- 薬菜飯店 Yakusai Hanten (Yakusai Chinese Restaurant) (1988)
- 夜のコント・冬のコント Yoru no Konto, Fuyu no Konto (Night Tales, Winter Tales) (1990)
- 最後の伝令 Saigo no Denrei (The Last Despatch) (1993)
- 鍵 Kagi (The Key) (1994)
- 座敷ぼっこ Zashiki Bokko (1994)
- 家族場面 Kazoku Bamen (Family Scenes) (1995)
- ジャズ小説 Jazu Shōsetsu (Jazz Novel) (1996)
- 満腹亭へようこそ Manpukutei-e Yōkoso (Welcome to Full Belly Inn) (1998)
- 魚藍観音記 Gyoran Kannon Ki (Records of the Gyoran Kannon) (2000)
- エンガッツィオ司令塔 Engattsio Shireitō (Engazzio Command Tower) (2000)
- 天狗の落し文 Tengu no Otoshibumi (Jottings of an Ogre) (2001)
- 懲戒の部屋 Chōkai no Heya (The Punishment Room) (2002)
- 驚愕の曠野 Kyōgaku no Kōya (2002)
- 最後の喫煙者 Saigo no Kitsuensha (The Last Smoker) (2002)
- 睡魔のいる夏 Suima no Iru Natsu (Summer When the Sleep Fairy Comes) (2002)
- 傾いた世界 Katamuita Sekai (The World is Tilting) (2002)
- 日本以外全部沈没 Nihon Igai Zembu Chinbotsu (Everything Other than Japan Sinks) (2002)
- 怪物たちの夜 Kaibutsu Tachi no Yoru (Night of the Phantoms) (2002)
- 近所迷惑 Kinjo Meiwaku (Disturbing the Neighbours) (2002)
- わが愛の税務署 Waga Ai no Zeimusho (My Beloved Tax Office) (2003)
- カメロイド文部省 Kameroido Monbushō (The Cameroid Ministry of Education) (2003)
- ポルノ惑星のサルモネラ人間 Poruno Wakusei no Sarumonera Ningen (Salmonella Men on Planet Porno) (2005)
- ヨッパ谷への降下 Yoppadani-e no Kōka (Descent to Yoppa Valley) (2005)
- 壊れかた指南 Kowarekata Shinan (Guide to Falling Apart) (2006)
- 陰悩録 Innōroku (Record of Dark Troubles) (2006)
- 如菩薩団 Nyobosatsudan (Team of Female Bodhisattvas) (2006)
- 夜を走る Yoru o Hashiru (Running at Night) (2006)
- 佇むひと Tatazumu Hito (Standing Woman) (2006)
- くさり Kusari (Chains) (2006)
- 出世の首 Shusse no Kubi (Getting Ahead) (2007)
- 繁栄の昭和 Hanei no Shōwa (Prosperous Showa) (2014)
- 世界はゴ冗談 Sekai ha Gojōdan (The World Is Your Joke) (2015)

=== Collected Works ===
- Collected Works by Tsutusi Yasutaka, 24 volumes, 1983 - 1985, Shinchosha

=== Discography ===
- with Kosuke Ichihara, Masahiko Sato, Dema (デマ, Rumour) (CBS/Sony, 1973)
- with Yōsuke Yamashita, Ie (家) (Frasco, 1976) – recorded in 1975-76
- with Yasutaka Tsutsui, Yasutaka Tsutsui - Bunmei (筒井康隆文明) (Victor/Super Fuji Discs, 1978)
- The Inner Space Of Yasutaka Tsutsui (Shinchosha, 1985)

== Adaptations ==
One of Tsutsui's first novels, Toki o Kakeru Shōjo (1967), has been adapted into numerous media including film, television, and manga. Another novel, Paprika (1993), was adapted into an animated film by the director Satoshi Kon in 2006. Many other works, including the four-part novel Fugō Keiji (Millionaire Detective), have been dramatized on Japanese television.

== Public image ==
Tsutsui has gained sensationalism for his humor and views against the social common senses and propaganda. (Note: The usage of "political correctness" by Peter Tasker has no relation to "comfort women", neither Tsutsui's tweet in 2017 (when Tsutsui was 82 years). Tasker explained about the controversy in the early 1990s. In those days, Tsutsui received a protest from the Japan Epilepsy Association regarding his depiction of epilepsy in his work. Asserting his freedom of expression, Tsutsui declared that he would stop writing in protest. It is this incident that Peter Tasker is referring to. Tasker continued in his text: the 82-year old Tsutsui’s trouble-making instincts are still intact. And Tasker mentioned Tsutsui's tweet on 2017.) On April 4, 2017, Tsutsui was criticized for posting a tweet referring to the Statue of Peace, (Note: The Japanese government hasn't ever acknowledged such views that comfort women were sex slaves, according to the historical facts.) (Note: The statement of the Ministry of the Foreign Affairs (MOFA) in Japan says: (5)＊「性奴隷」－「性奴隷」という表現は、事実に反するので使用すべきでない。この点は、2015年12月の日韓合意の際に韓国側とも確認しており、同合意においても一切使われていない。[(5) * "Sex-slave" - The term "sex slave" should not be used, as it is contrary to the facts. This point was confirmed with the South Korean Side during the Japan-South Korea Agreement of December 2015, and this term (sex-slave) was not used at all in that agreement.].) stating, "That girl is cute. Everyone, let's go and ejaculate in front of her and shower her with semen", on his Twitter. The tweet has long since been deleted.

== References and notes ==
=== References ===
- Masao Azuma and Ran Ishido The Dictionary of Japanese Fantasy Writers (2009), 東雅夫＆石堂藍編『日本幻想作家事典』国書刊行会（2009）ISBN 978-4-336-05142-4 pp.459 - 463
