= Beverley Bass =

American pilot

- Born: Beverley Bass; March 27, 1952 (age 74); Fort Myers, Florida, United States
- Education: Texas Christian University
- Occupation: Pilot for American Airlines
- Years active: 1976–2008
- Spouse: Tom Stawicki
- Children: 2

Beverley Bass (born March 27, 1952) is an American aircraft pilot and was the first female captain of an American Airlines commercial plane. (Note: Bonnie Tiburzi in 1973 was the first woman pilot on an American Airlines aircraft.) She was hired in 1976 by American Airlines as their third female pilot. In 1986, Bass became the first female captain of a commercial plane at American Airlines and later that year she captained the first all-female crew at American Airlines from Washington, D.C. to Dallas, Texas. She and pilot Stephanie Wallach founded the International Society of Women Airline Pilots, which began as a group of women aviators but later changed into a program providing career support and mentorship to aspiring pilots.

== Early life ==
Bass was born and raised in Fort Myers, Florida and graduated from high school in 1970. She studied Spanish and Interior Design at Texas Christian University (TCU), receiving bachelor's degrees in both subjects in May 1974. Bass cites her aunt, who would park her Volkswagen Beetle by the local airport's chain-link fence so Bass could watch planes takeoff and land, as her inspiration to start flying. Bass's father, fearing losing her interest in the family's quarter horses, refused flying lessons.

Bass started flying the summer after her first year at TCU, in 1971. She logged her hours at Fort Worth's Meacham Airport, spending six hours there each afternoon. Bass's first professional experience came when a local mortician needed to fly a young woman's body to Arkansas.

Bass's career in commercial aviation began with difficulty, Bass said: "I was told there couldn't be a female pilot flying executives around because what would the wives think".

== Diversion to Gander on September 11, 2001 ==
Bass was piloting a Boeing 777 en route from Charles de Gaulle Airport to Dallas/Fort Worth International Airport when the terror attacks of September 11, 2001 occurred. Due to the closure of American airspace, Bass's flight was ordered to land at Gander International Airport in Gander, Newfoundland, as part of the Canadian government's Operation Yellow Ribbon.

Her experience in Gander during the days following the attacks, including her learning of the fate of her friend and fellow pilot Charles Burlingame on American Airlines Flight 77, was one of several people's stories featured in the Tony Award–winning Canadian musical Come from Away. While the Beverley Bass character in the musical is partly a composite character combining experiences of other pilots in Gander at the time, the number "Me and the Sky" is entirely drawn from the real Bass's life story. Bass has developed a close friendship with Jenn Colella, the actress who portrays her in the Broadway company of Come from Away, and frequently traveled to see the show. At the show's closing night in Seattle, Bass presented Colella with the flight jacket, wings, and service pin she was wearing on September 11, to be worn on Broadway. For her performance as Bass, as well as other characters such as Gander resident Annette, Colella was nominated for the Tony Award for Best Performance by a Featured Actress in a Musical.

== Honors ==
In 2019 she was made Brian Kelly's TPG Awards honoree, and it was announced that his company had donated $50,000 to the International Society of Women Airline Pilots in Bass's honor. She was the recipient of the distinguished alumni award from Texas Christian University.

== Personal life ==
Bass is married to Tom Stawicki and has two children.

== Bibliography ==
- Bass, Beverley; Williams, Cynthia (2019). Me and The Sky: Captain Beverley Bass, Pioneering Pilot. Illustrated by Joanie Stone. Alfred A. Knopf. ISBN 978-0-525-64551-1. OCLC 1119390092.
