= Paprika (2006 film) =

2006 Japanese anime film

- Theatrical release poster
- Directed by: Satoshi Kon
- Screenplay by: Seishi Minakami; Satoshi Kon
- Based on: Paprika by Yasutaka Tsutsui
- Produced by: Jungo Maruta; Masao Takiyama
- Starring: Megumi Hayashibara; Tōru Emori; Katsunosuke Hori; Tōru Furuya; Akio Otsuka; Koichi Yamadera; Hideyuki Tanaka
- Cinematography: Michiya Katou
- Edited by: Takeshi Seyama
- Music by: Susumu Hirasawa
- Production company: Madhouse
- Distributed by: Sony Pictures Entertainment Japan
- Release dates: 2 September 2006 (Venice); 25 November 2006 (Japan)
- Running time: 90 minutes
- Country: Japan
- Language: Japanese
- Budget: ¥300 million (2.6 million USD)
- Box office: $2.5 million

Paprika (Japanese: パプリカ, Hepburn: Papurika) is a 2006 Japanese animated surrealist science fiction psychological thriller film directed by Satoshi Kon, who co-wrote the screenplay with Seishi Minakami.. It is based on the 1993 novel by Yasutaka Tsutsui. The Japanese voice cast stars Megumi Hayashibara, Tōru Emori, Katsunosuke Hori, Tōru Furuya, Akio Otsuka, Koichi Yamadera, and Hideyuki Tanaka. The film follows a battle between an unknown "dream terrorist" who causes nightmares by stealing a device that allows others to share their dreams, the research psychologist Dr. Atsuko Chiba, and a personality named Paprika—a dream detective who shares Atsuko's mind.

Paprika was Kon's fourth and final feature film before his death in 2010. His co-writer Seishi Minakami had previously written for Kon's TV series Paranoia Agent (2004), while the film's character design and animation director was Masashi Ando, and the music was composed by Kon's frequent collaborator Susumu Hirasawa. The art director was Nobutaka Ike, who worked on all of Kon's projects. Japanese animation studio Madhouse animated and produced the film.

The film had its worldwide premiere at the 63rd Venice International Film Festival, where it competed for the Golden Lion. It was released in Japan on November 25, 2006, and received critical acclaim.

== Plot ==
In the near future, a newly created device called the DC Mini allows users to view people's dreams. The head of the team working on this treatment, Dr. Atsuko Chiba, begins using the machine illegally to help psychiatric patients outside the research facility by assuming her dream world alter-ego, a detective named Paprika. Atsuko's closest allies are Dr. Toratarō Shima, the chief of the department, and Dr. Kōsaku Tokita, the inventor of the DC Mini.

Paprika counsels a detective named Toshimi Konakawa, who is plagued by a recurring dream regarding an unknown former colleague and a victim in a homicide case he is investigating. She gives Toshimi a card with the name of a website on it, which leads him into a bar where he is able to meet Paprika, who compares the Internet to dreams. In a meeting with the company chairman, Dr. Seijirō Inui, to discuss the theft of three DC Mini prototypes, Toratarō goes on a nonsensical tirade and jumps through a window, nearly killing himself. Upon examining Toratarō's dream, which is a parade of random objects, Kōsaku recognizes his assistant, Kei Himuro, which confirms their suspicion that the theft was an inside job.

While investigating Himuro's home, Atsuko ignores the warnings that Paprika gives her, and accidentally slips into a dream space, which, due to her frequent use of the DC Mini, can now affect her constantly. Atsuko almost dies, after ignoring another warning by Paprika, but is rescued by her co-investigators.

When two other scientists fall victim to the DC Mini, Seijirō bans the use of the device. This fails to hinder the crazed parade, now inside Himuro's dream, which claims Kōsaku. Paprika and Toratarō discover that Himuro is only an empty shell. The real culprit is Seijirō, who believes that he must protect dreams from humankind's influence through dream therapy, with the help of Dr. Morio Osanai. Investigating the demise of the two scientists, Toshimi meets with Atsuko, Toratarō, and Kōsaku. Leaving the meeting, he has an anxiety attack. In an emergency session with Paprika, she reveals the scenes in his dreams each correspond to genres of movies. The parade bursts into Toshimi's dream, prompting Paprika to leave the session to help Kōsaku in Himuro's dream.

Paprika is captured by Seijirō and Morio, who obsessively confesses his love for Atsuko and peels away Paprika's skin to reveal Atsuko underneath. However, he is interrupted by the outraged Seijirō, who demands that they finish off Atsuko. Meanwhile in his dream at the bar, Toshimi learns his recurring dream is based in anxiety over the illness and death of his colleague from his youth whose memory he'd repressed, with whom he aspired to be a film director. Resolving his anxieties, Toshimi finds and enters Himuro's dream and flees with Atsuko back into his own dream. Morio gives chase, which ends in Toshimi shooting Morio. The act kills Morio's physical body in the real world.

Dreams and reality begin to merge. The dream parade runs amok in the city, and reality starts to unravel. Toratarō is nearly killed by a giant doll, but is saved by Paprika, who now appears as a fully separate entity from Atsuko. Amidst the chaos, Kōsaku, in the form of a giant robot, eats Atsuko and prepares to do the same to Paprika. Seijirō, in a megalomaniacal delirium, returns in the form of a giant humanoid nightmare and threatens to darken the world with his delusions. Paprika throws herself into Kōsaku's body. A baby emerges from the robotic shell and consumes Seijirō, aging into a fully-grown combination of Atsuko and Paprika as she does so, then fades away, ending the nightmare.

In the real world, Atsuko sits at Kōsaku's bedside as he wakes up. Toshimi later visits the website from Paprika's card and receives a message from Paprika, suggesting the film Dreaming Kids to him. He enters a cinema and purchases a ticket for Dreaming Kids.

== Cast ==
- Megumi Hayashibara as Dr. Atsuko Chiba (千葉 敦子博士, Chiba Atsuko-hakase), an attractive and modest psychiatrist and researcher at the Institute for Psychiatric Research. She uses the DC Mini to treat her clients inside their dreams under the guise of her alter ego Paprika (パプリカ, Papurika). Chiba is voiced by Cindy Robinson in the English dub.
- Tōru Furuya as Dr. Kōsaku Tokita (時田 浩作博士, Tokita Kōsaku-hakase), the childish and obese inventor of the DC Mini. He is a former friend of the DC Mini thief Himuro and a close colleague of Chiba, whom he often affectionately calls "At-chan". Tokita is voiced by Yuri Lowenthal in the English dub.
- Tōru Emori as Dr. Seijirō Inui (乾 精次郎博士, Inui Seijirō-hakase), the paraplegic chairman of the Institute for Psychiatric Research. He is hostile toward the development of the DC Mini due to the danger he believes it poses. Inui is voiced by Michael Forest in the English dub.
- Katsunosuke Hori as Dr. Toratarō Shima (島 寅太郎博士, Shima Toratarō-hakase), the cheerful and friendly chief of staff at the Institute for Psychiatric Research and an ally of Chiba. Shima is voiced by David Lodge in the English dub.
- Akio Otsuka as Detective Toshimi Konakawa (粉川 利美刑事, Konakawa Toshimi-keiji), a friend of Shima and a client of Paprika. He is haunted by a recurring dream that stems from an anxiety neurosis. He is infatuated with Paprika. Konakawa is voiced by Paul St. Peter in the English dub.
- Koichi Yamadera as Dr. Morio Osanai (小山内 守雄博士, Osanai Morio-hakase), a staff member of the Institute for Psychiatric Research who harbors feelings for Chiba but is frustrated by her ignorance of him and jealous of Tokita's talent. Osanai is voiced by Doug Erholtz in the English dub.
- Hideyuki Tanaka as "That Guy", a slightly obscured man who appears in Konakawa's recurring nightmare.
- Satomi Kōrogi as a Japanese doll that frequently appears in the collective nightmare.
- Daisuke Sakaguchi as Kei Himuro, a friend and assistant of Tokita and a suspect in the theft of the DC Mini. Himuro is voiced by Brian Beacock in the English dub.
- Mitsuo Iwata as Dr. Yasushi Tsumura, a scientist who falls victim to the DC Mini thief.
- Rikako Aikawa as Dr. Nobue Kakimoto, a scientist who falls victim to the DC Mini thief.
- Yasutaka Tsutsui as Kuga, one of the two Radio Club bartenders.
- Satoshi Kon as Jinnai, one of the two Radio Club bartenders.

== Music ==
The soundtrack was released on 23 November 2006 under the TESLAKITE label. It was composed by Susumu Hirasawa. A bonus movie was included with the CD.

The soundtrack is notable for being one of the first film scores to use Vocaloid (Lola as the "voicebank") for vocals. It's also the last of Hirasawa's albums where an Amiga computer was used for composition. All MIDI was sequenced through an Amiga 4000 running the Bars n Pipes program.

== Production ==
Due to the small scale of release, both Millennium Actress and Tokyo Godfathers had a hard time recouping their investment funds. However, Kon's name had become known among the film industry by the time of the Paprika project, and his reputation had already been established, so the film was produced.

After finishing his first film, Perfect Blue, Kon was planning to make his next film, Paprika, with the producer of the company that financed it, but the project was ruined when the company, Rex Entertainment, went bankrupt. However, the idea of Paprika was in Kon's mind as early as 1998, and his attempts to depict the ambiguities and shaky boundaries between "illusion and reality" and "memory and reality" in his directorial debut Perfect Blue and his original film Millennium Actress were actually because he wanted to visually portray a dynamic like the novel Paprika.

Later, when he met with the author, Yasutaka Tsutsui, and received his permission to make the film, Kon stated that he felt as if he had realized what he had always imagined.

Unlike Perfect Blue, which was also based on a novel, Kon didn't change the fundamental parts of the original in Paprika, but he did change some parts of the novel to fit the movie. For two reasons, Kon thought that the original could not be adapted into a movie. One reason was that the novel Paprika was too voluminous to fit into a single film, and the other reason was that over ten years had already passed since the novel was published, and many creators had already embodied the ideas inspired by Paprika in various media, not just in films. Therefore, Kon decided to first make the original into a simple form, and then incorporate ideas from the original as well as from Tsutsui's other works into the frame. Kon believed that the charm of the original lay in the dream scenes, and that the film would only be complete if the dream world was portrayed in rich detail with expressions that he believed only visual images could provide. The descriptions of dreams in the novel were supplemented by explanations in the text. However, in the case of visual works, which show the images of dreams flowing one after another, explanation would hinder the flow.

In order to create a glamorous image for the entire film, and still devote enough time to portraying the dream scenes without introducing the characters, Kon, in contrast to the previous film, used voice actors who were well known for their voice acting and whom he deemed to fit the characters' image.

The budget was approximately 300 million yen, and the production took about two and a half years from planning to completion.

== Themes ==
Like Kon's other works, this film uses the motif of "fiction and reality" to depict a world in which seamlessly connected dreams and reality are violently switched, and the boundary between fiction and reality becomes indistinct, in a uniquely realistic manner.

For Kon, "fiction" and "reality" are not opposing concepts, but both are homogeneous in the sense that they are both "painted things," and the only thing that separates the two is "what is drawn there." Kon rarely traced real scenes when he drew, and he wanted his pictures to be more abstract than realistic, so that they would "look like that." In other words, the screen full of reality that the audience feels as if it is real is just a "picture" for Kon, and because it is animation, there is essentially no distinction between reality and fiction in its expression. This gap is what gives birth to the "tricks" that support Satoshi Kon's works. The relationship between "fiction and reality" in Kon's work is that real pictures that make you forget that they are pictures are "reality" first, and then arrange them in the same position as reality and fiction in the form of "actually this was a picture (fiction)", and it is an illusion unique to anime. However, what makes this work different from Kon's other works is that it has a deeper relationship between "dream" and "reality," where "dream" and "reality" are each transformed into the existence of the other. In the film, the "dream" is represented as a "distorted reality reflecting the unconscious desires of the dreamer," and the trick is to transform the "reality" into the "dream" by adding distortions at the level of the picture, and the "dream" into the "reality" by correcting the distortions.

Furthermore, Kon's work often examine viewers' relationships with media and film culture which is a theme that pops up in Paprika through its quest of dreams, cinema imagery and perception of reality. We see cinema imagery or representation of cinema during many of Toshimi Konakawa's dream segments due to other fact that he used to love films and even was in the process of making one with his past friend. Even more so many of Kon Satoshi's films are quietly on display in Paprika like Perfect Blue.

In this film, Kon's core theme is the duality, multifacetedness, contrast, and the balance between them, which he intentionally incorporated into the film from the beginning. The relationship between Atsuko and Paprika is one of contrast and duality within the same person, but the characterization and arrangement of the other characters follows the same idea.

The parade of inanimate "nightmares" depicted in the film is not found in the novel, and was entirely Kon's idea. With the time limitation of the film, it was difficult to portray various dreams in different ways as in the original, so Kon decided to focus on a dream image that would be symbolic throughout the film and that would be instantly recognizable as a nightmare when it appeared. According to Kon, the parade scene was something that he and Susumu Hirasawa, who produced the music, created together.

== Release ==
=== Festivals ===
Paprika premiered on 2 September 2006, at the 63rd Venice Film Festival. It screened at the 44th New York Film Festival, playing on 7 October 2006. It competed at the 19th Tokyo International Film Festival 21–29 October 2006, as the opening screening for the 2006 TIFF Animation CG Festival. It also competed in 27th Fantasporto from 23 February to 3 March 2007. Paprika was shown at the 2007 National Cherry Blossom Festival in Washington, D.C., as the closing film of the Anime Marathon at the Freer Gallery of the Smithsonian, and at the 2007 Greater Philadelphia Cherry Blossom Festival. It played at the Sarasota Film Festival on 21 April 2007, in Sarasota, Florida. Additionally, it was shown at the 39th International Film Festival in Auckland, New Zealand, on 22 July 2007, and was shown as the festival travelled around New Zealand.

=== Distribution ===
Paprika was distributed in Japan by Sony Pictures Entertainment Japan, the same company that distributed the previous film Tokyo Godfathers, and ran from November 25, 2006, until March 2007. The film was first released in November in three limited theaters in Kantō region, and it drew a total of 2,210 people and grossed 3,460,500 yen ($30,000 at the exchange rate at the time) on its first two days, and a total of 71,236 people and 100 million yen ($870,000) in January of the following year, the eighth week of its release.

In the United States, the film received a limited release on May 24, 2007, with Sony Pictures Classics distributing the film. It was initially released in only two theaters, in New York City and Los Angeles, but was gradually expanded to show on up to 37 screens simultaneously. However, the total number of theaters far exceeded that, eventually reaching over 80. It was rare for Japanese anime to be released theatrically in the U.S. and, up until the 2010s when wider anime releases slowly started to become more common, were largely confined to a very small handful of arthouse theaters, so for the standards at the time, the scale of over 80 theaters was quite large for an anime release in America. (Note: Kon's previous film Millennium Actress (2001) was released in 6 theaters, Tokyo Godfathers (2003) in 10, and the same Japanese anime films Ghost in the Shell 2: Innocence (2004) in 55 and Steamboy (2005) in 39.)

=== Box office ===
The film grossed $882,267 in the United States. (Note: At the time, this was the 12th Japanese theatrical anime to earn over 100 million yen at the box office in the U.S., the first time in two years since Howl's Moving Castle in 2005, and the only two R-rated theatrical anime for adults were this film and Cowboy Bebop: Heaven's Door, released in 2003.) In other territories, the film grossed $62,648 in Singapore, Italy and South Korea as of 2007, for an overseas total of $944,915 outside of Japan. Additionally, Paprika has earned $882,267 domestically and has gained a total of $2,506,128 at the box office.

== Reception ==
=== Critical reception ===
On the review aggregator website Rotten Tomatoes, 87% of 95 reviews are positive, with an average rating of 7.4/10 and the consensus reading: "Following its own brand of logic, Paprika is an eye-opening mind trip that is difficult to follow but never fails to dazzle." Metacritic assigned the film a weighted average score of 81 out of 100 based on 26 critic reviews, indicating "universal acclaim". Paprika won the Best Feature Length Theatrical Anime Award at the sixth-annual Tokyo Anime Awards during the 2007 Tokyo International Anime Fair.

Andrez Bergen of The Yomiuri Shimbun praised Paprika as the "most mesmerizing animation long-player since Miyazaki's Spirited Away five years ago" (in 2001). He also praised the film's animation and backgrounds. Mick LaSalle of the San Francisco Chronicle gave it a positive review, saying that the film is a "sophisticated work of the imagination" and "challenging and disturbing and uncanny in the ways it captures the nature of dreams". LaSalle later went on to say that the film is a "unique and superior achievement." Rob Nelson of The Village Voice praised the film for its visuals. However, he complained about the plot, saying that Paprika is not "a movie that's meant to be understood so much as simply experienced – or maybe dreamed." Nelson later went on to say that Kon "maintains a charming faith in cinema's ability to seduce fearless new (theater) audiences, even one viewer at a time." Manohla Dargis of The New York Times said that the film has a "sense of unease about the rapidly changing relationship between our physical selves and our machines." Dargis praised Kon for his direction, saying that he "shows us the dark side of the imaginative world in Paprika that he himself has perceptively brightened." Helen McCarthy in 500 Essential Anime Movies said that Paprika "proves once again that the great science fiction doesn't rely on giant robots and alien worlds".

Conversely, Roger Moore of the Orlando Sentinel gave a negative review, saying: "With a conventional invade-dreams/bend-reality plot, it's a bit of a bore. It's not as dreamlike and mesmerizing as Richard Linklater's rotoscope-animation Waking Life, less fanciful than the Oscar-winning anime Spirited Away." Bruce Westbrook of the Houston Chronicle said the film "is as trippy as a Jefferson Airplane light show" and criticized the characters and the dialogue.

The Lord of the Rings and Eternal Sunshine of the Spotless Mind actor Elijah Wood praised the film in an interview, Time included it in its top 25 animated films of all time, while Time Out also included the film in its list of top 50 animated films of all time. Rotten Tomatoes included it in its list of fifty best animated films of all time. Newsweek Japan included Paprika in its list of the 100 best films of all time, while the American edition of Newsweek included it among its top twenty films of 2007. Metacritic has listed the film among the top 25 highest-rated science fiction films of all time, and the top 30 highest-rated animations of all time.

=== Awards and nominations ===
Paprika received the following awards and nominations:

Year	Award	Category	Recipient	Result
2006	Montréal Festival of New Cinema	Public's Choice Award	Satoshi Kon	Won
2006	Venice Film Festival	Golden Lion (Best Film)	Satoshi Kon	Nominated
2007	Fantasporto	Critics Choice Award (Prêmio da Crítica)	Satoshi Kon	Won
2007	Newport Beach Film Festival	Feature Film Award for Best Animation	Satoshi Kon	Won
2007	Online Film Critics Society Awards	Best Animated Film	Satoshi Kon	Nominated

== Legacy ==
=== Live-action adaptation ===
A live-action adaptation of Paprika, to be directed by Wolfgang Petersen, was in development in 2009. However, since then, there has not been any significant update to whether it will be produced (Petersen died in 2022). In August 2022, it was reported that Cathy Yan would direct and executive produce a live-action television adaptation for Amazon Studios.

=== Inception ===
Several critics and scholars have noted many striking similarities that later appeared in the 2010 Christopher Nolan's film Inception, including plot similarities, similar scenes and similar characters, arguing that Inception was influenced by Paprika, or in extreme cases, some accuse Nolan of stealing the idea from Satoshi Kon. Ciara Wardlow of Film School Rejects argues that Inception was influenced by Paprika based on similarities too numerous to be coincidence, from "the focus on dream sharing technology to Ariadne's wardrobe to references to Greek mythology, physics-defying hallways, significant dream-elevators, and the choice of having a Japanese businessman (Saito) be the one to hire Cobb and the dream team, among other things". Patrick Drazen said at least "one scene is a clean and undeniable link: in the climactic dream sequence, when Paprika is trying to escape the chairman and his helper, she defies gravity by running across the wall instead of the floor." Julian Rizzo-Smith of IGN claims that "Nolan drew upon famous scenery of Paprika", noting striking similarities such as "the ever-stretching long hallway where Toshimi witnesses a murder, and the visual effect of the dream world shattering like glass." Joshua Horner of WhatCulture claims that "Nolan was inspired by Paprika", and adds that there are strikingly similar scenes where Paprika and Ariadne both "enter an elevator with each floor representing another layer of the host's subconscious."

Alistair Swale, while uncertain whether Nolan "appropriated elements of Paprika directly", notes striking similarities between them, such as both exploring similar themes of "computer technology enabling people to enter the realm of the subconscious and experience time on multiple levels", and notes their similarities are comparable to that which exists between Ghost in the Shell and The Matrix. Steven Boone of Politico said he suspects Paprika "was on Nolan's list of homages", and compares it favourably with Inception, arguing that "Kon confronts his tormented society with visual poetry, not just a remix of tropes and set pieces" and that Paprika "goes deep, where Inception just talks of depth and darkness but, as a screen experience, sticks with glib pyrotechnics". French film site Excessif claimed in 2010 that Nolan cited Paprika as an influence on Elliot Page's (Note: Credited as Ellen Page; Page came out as transgender and changed his name in 2020.) character Ariadne in Inception, a claim repeated by Phil de Semlyen of Empire, but Film School Rejects and Anime News Network note that no direct quote from Nolan was given to support this claim.

== See also ==
- False awakening
- Lucid dream
- The Lathe of Heaven

== Bibliography ==
- Perper, T.; Cornog, M. (2009). "Psychoanalytic Cyberpunk Midsummer-Night's Dreamtime: Kon Satoshi's Paprika". Mechademia. 4: 326–329. doi:10.1353/mec.0.0051.
