= The Only Thrill =

- Directed by: Peter Masterson
- Written by: Larry Ketron
- Based on: The Trading Post by Larry Ketron
- Starring: Diane Keaton; Sam Shepard; Diane Lane; Robert Patrick
- Music by: Peter Rodgers Melnick
- Release date: 1997
- Running time: 103 mins.
- Country: United States
- Language: English

The Only Thrill is a 1997 independent romantic drama film directed by Peter Masterson and written by Larry Ketron, who adapted the film's screenplay from his 1981 play The Trading Post. It stars Diane Keaton and Sam Shepard.

== Plot ==
In Lockhart, Texas, circa 1966, Reece McHenry, whose wife is in a coma, owns a clothing store. He hires widow Carol Fritzsimmons as a seamstress in the shop and they soon begin an affair.

Reece is unable to commit to the relationship due to the circumstances of his wife. His son, Tom, meantime, has taken up with Carol's daughter, Katherine, but Katherine has commitment issues similar to those of Tom's father.

Events transpire causing the two McHenry men to lose the women in their lives. Carol must move to Canada to be with an ill sister and cannot persuade Reece to come with her. Katherine's dream is to become an actress, and when she finally gets an opportunity, she leaves Tom to burn her oats. Ten years later, when the Fritzsimmons women return, both men and women must cope with their lifelong regrets.

== Cast ==
- Diane Keaton as Carol Fritzsimmons
- Sam Shepard as Reece McHenry
- Diane Lane as Katherine Fritzsimmons
- Robert Patrick as Colonel Tom Ryan McHenry
- Tate Donovan as Eddie
- Sharon Lawrence as Joleen Quillet
- Rick Harris as extra

== Production ==
Based on his 1981 play The Trading Post, playwright and screenwriter Larry Ketron originally wrote the film's screenplay with the title Tennessee Valley, as his original play was set in rural East Tennessee, where Ketron was raised. Director Peter Masterson suggested his home state of Texas to Ketron due to a lack of available local film crews in Tennessee.

Filming took place 25 days in and around the cities of Lockhart and Manor in Texas during the fall of 1996.
