= Katsunosuke Hori =

Japanese actor, voice actor and narrator

- 堀 勝之祐
- Born: August 1, 1941 (age 85); Tokyo, Japan
- Occupations: Actor; voice actor; narrator
- Years active: 1959–present
- Agent: 81 Produce
- Height: 165 cm (5 ft 5 in)

Katsunosuke Hori (堀 勝之祐, Hori Katsunosuke; born August 1, 1941) is a Japanese actor, voice actor and narrator from the Tokyo Metropolitan area. He is a member of 81 Produce. He is known for dubbing for Harvey Keitel, Robert De Niro, Jon Voight, Charles Dance and many more. He was also the first dubbing voice actor of Alain Delon and Harrison Ford in their early days.

== Filmography ==
=== Film ===
- Lucky Dragon No. 5 (1959)

=== Television drama ===
- Hissatsu series (1972–1977) - Sentaro, Inokichi, Kiyozo and Yahei
- Kamen Rider X (1974 (Ep.32)) - Alicapone
- Taiyō ni Hoero! (1975, 1977 (Eps.180, 235))
- Ōedo Sōsamō (1975, 1976 (Eps.197, 234))
- Tokugawa Ieyasu (1983) - Mashita Nagamori
- Mōri Motonari (1997) - Takahashi Hisamitsu

=== Television animation ===
1970s

- New Star of Giants (1977) (Romeo, Nanjo)
- Lupin the Third Part II (1978) (Lawrence III)
- The Rose of Versailles (1979) (Hans Axel von Fersen) (Temporary replacement for Nachi Nozawa)

1980s

- Space Warrior Baldios (1980) (Narrator, Chief Takeshi Getsuei, Admiral Herman)
- Ashita no Joe 2 (1980) (Shin Suga)
- Lucy-May of the Southern Rainbow (1982) (Arthur)*Lady Georgie(1983) ( Johnston Episode 11)
- Maison Ikkoku (1986) (Zenzaburō Mitsukoshi)

1990s

- Trapp Family Story (1991) (Georg von Trapp)
- Blue Seed (1994) (Narrator)
- The Big O (1999) (Michael Seebach/Schwarzwald)
- Blue Gender (1999) (Seno Miyagi)
- Sensual Phrase (1999) (Master of Brown Lodge)
- Zoids: Chaotic Century (1999) (Wagner)

2000s

- Monkey Typhoon (2002) (Tendō)
- RahXephon (2002) (Jōji Futagami)
- Astro Boy (2003) (Doctor Saruta)
- Stellvia (2003) (Richard James)
- Emma (2005) (Viscount Campbell)
- El Cazador de la Bruja (2007) (Webster)
- Darker than Black: Gemini of the Meteor (2009) (Dr. Pavlichenko)
- Fullmetal Alchemist: Brotherhood (2009) (Fu)

2010s

- Marvel Anime: X-Men (2011) (Charles Xavier/Professor X)
- Zetman (2012) (Jirou Nakata)
- Eureka Seven: AO (2012) (Toshio Fukai)
- Tokyo Ghoul √A (2015) (Tsuneyoshi Washū)
- Unlimited Fafnir (2015) (Yggdrasill)

=== OVA ===
- Legend of the Galactic Heroes (1989) (Cornelius Lutz)
- Hellsing Ultimate (2006) (Sir Islands)

=== Theatrical animation ===
- Ghost in the Shell 2: Innocence (2004)
- Paprika (2006) (Doctor Toratarō Shima)
- Appleseed Alpha (2014) (Mattews)

=== Video games ===
- SD Gundam G Generation (????) (General Revil)
- Super Robot Wars series (????–??) (Schwarzwald)

=== Dubbing roles ===
==== Live-action ====
- Alain Delon
  - Rocco and His Brothers (1971 TV Tokyo edition) (Rocco Parondi)
  - The Joy of Living (1971 NHK edition) (Ulisse Cecconato)
  - Any Number Can Win (1970 TV Tokyo edition) (Francis Verlot)
  - The Leopard (1971 NET edition) (Prince Tancredi Falconeri)
  - The Unvanquished (TV Asahi edition)(Thomas Vlassenroot)
  - The Yellow Rolls-Royce (1972 TV Asahi edition) (Stefano)
  - Once a Thief (TV Asahi edition) (Eddie Pedak)
  - Diabolically Yours (TV Asahi edition) (Pierre Lagrange / Georges Campo)
  - Le Samouraï (1971 TBS edition) (Jef Costello)
  - Spirits of the Dead (1972 TBS edition) (William Wilson)
  - Adieu l'ami (1986 TBS edition) (Dino Barran)
- Harvey Keitel
  - Mortal Thoughts (Detective John Woods)
  - Reservoir Dogs (Mr. White, a.k.a. Larry Dimmick)
  - Sister Act (Vince LaRocca)
  - Smoke (Augustus 'Auggie' Wren)
  - Head Above Water (George)
- Harrison Ford
  - Force 10 from Navarone (1986 TV Asahi edition) (Lt. Col. Barnsby)
  - Hanover Street (David Halloran)
  - Blade Runner (1986 TBS edition) (Rick Deckard)
  - Working Girl (Jack Trainer)
  - Regarding Henry (Henry Turner)
- Robert De Niro
  - We're No Angels (Ned)
  - Mad Dog and Glory (VHS edition) (Wayne 'Mad Dog' Dobie)
  - Hide and Seek (Dr. David Callaway / Charlie)
  - Righteous Kill (Detective Tom "Turk" Cowan)
  - American Hustle (Victor Tellegio)
- William Hurt
  - Body Heat (1987 TV Asahi edition) (Ned Racine)
  - Gorky Park (Arkady Renko)
  - The Doctor (Dr. Jack McKee)
  - Dark City (Inspector Frank Bumstead)
- 2001: A Space Odyssey (1981 TV Asahi edition) (Dr. David Bowman (Keir Dullea))
- Alien vs. Predator (Charles Bishop Weyland (Lance Henriksen))
- As Good as It Gets (Melvin Udall (Jack Nicholson))
- The Aviator (Ralph Owen Brewster (Alan Alda))
- Batman (TBS edition) (Bruce Wayne/Batman (Michael Keaton))
- A Better Tomorrow (Sung Tse-Ho (Ti Lung))
- Blue Velvet (Frank Booth (Dennis Hopper))
- The Bridge on the River Kwai (Colonel Nicholson (Alec Guinness))
- Chain Reaction (1999 TV Asahi edition) (Lyman Earl Collier (Brian Cox))
- Child's Play 2 (Phil Simpson (Gerrit Graham))
- Cliffhanger (Eric Qualen (John Lithgow))
- The Company (Alberto Antonelli (Malcolm McDowell))
- Cujo (1986 TBS edition) (Steve Kemp (Christopher Stone))
- Dead Poets Society (John Keating (Robin Williams))
- Death Wish 3 (Manny Fraker (Gavan O'Herlihy))
- Die Hard 2 (1994 TV Asahi edition) (Colonel William Stuart (William Sadler))
- Dracula Untold (Master Vampire / Caligula (Charles Dance))
- End of Days (2001 TV Asahi edition) (Father Kovak (Rod Steiger))
- Enter the Dragon (Roper (John Saxon))
- Eraser (Robert DeGuerin (James Caan))
- The Expendables 2 (Booker (Chuck Norris))
- Family Business (Vito McMullen (Dustin Hoffman))
- Fantastic Beasts and Where to Find Them (Henry Shaw Sr. (Jon Voight))
- Flesh for Frankenstein (Otto (Arno Juerging))
- Friends (Dr. Leonard Green (Ron Leibman))
- Ghostbusters (Harold Filmore (Charles Dance))
- Gladiator (Senator Gracchus (Derek Jacobi))
- The Glimmer Man (1999 TV Asahi edition) (Mr. Smith (Brian Cox))
- Gone in 60 Seconds (Otto Halliwell (Robert Duvall))
- Hairspray (Wilbur Turnblad (Christopher Walken))
- Halloween II (1988 NTV edition) (Deputy Gary Hunt (Hunter von Leer))
- A Hard Day's Night (George Harrison)
- Hard Target (1997 Fuji TV edition) (Emil Fouchon (Lance Henriksen))
- Knockaround Guys (Benny "Chains" Demaret (Dennis Hopper))
- Labyrinth (Fuji TV edition) (Jareth (David Bowie))
- Lara Croft: Tomb Raider (2005 TV Asahi edition) (Lord Richard Croft (Jon Voight))
- Mad Max 2 (1997 TV Asahi edition) (Pappagallo (Michael Preston))
- Mannequin (B.J. Wert (Steve Vinovich))
- Merlin (Great Dragon (Kilgharrah) (John Hurt))
- The Mighty Peking Man (Johnny Feng (Danny Lee))
- Missing in Action 2: The Beginning (Colonel James Braddock (Chuck Norris))
- Pat Garrett and Billy the Kid (Billy the Kid (Kris Kristofferson))
- Police Story 3: Super Cop (Khun Chaibat (Kenneth Tsang))
- Poseidon (Robert Ramsey (Kurt Russell))
- Savage Harvest (Casey (Tom Skerritt))
- Secondhand Lions (Hub McCann (Robert Duvall))
- Schindler's List (Oskar Schindler (Liam Neeson))
- Sense and Sensibility (Colonel Brandon (Alan Rickman))
- The Silence of the Lambs (Hannibal Lecter (Anthony Hopkins))
- Storm Catcher (General William Jacobs (Robert Miano))
- The Strain (Professor Abraham Setrakian (David Bradley))
- They Live (1990 TV Asahi edition) (Nada (Roddy Piper))
- Ticker (Alex Swan (Dennis Hopper))
- The Towering Inferno (1989 TBS edition) (Doug Roberts (Paul Newman))
- Twin Peaks: Fire Walk With Me (Leland Palmer (Ray Wise))
- Valkyrie (General Ludwig Beck (Terence Stamp))
- Vanilla Sky (Dr. Curtis McCabe (Kurt Russell))
- A Walk in the Woods (Bill Bryson (Robert Redford))
- Zombi 2 (1982 TBS edition) (Peter West (Ian McCulloch))

==== Animation ====
- Batman: The Animated Series (Josiah Wormwood)
- Iron Man (Howard Stark)
- Thomas & Friends (The Admiral)
