= Jenn Colella =

American actress and singer

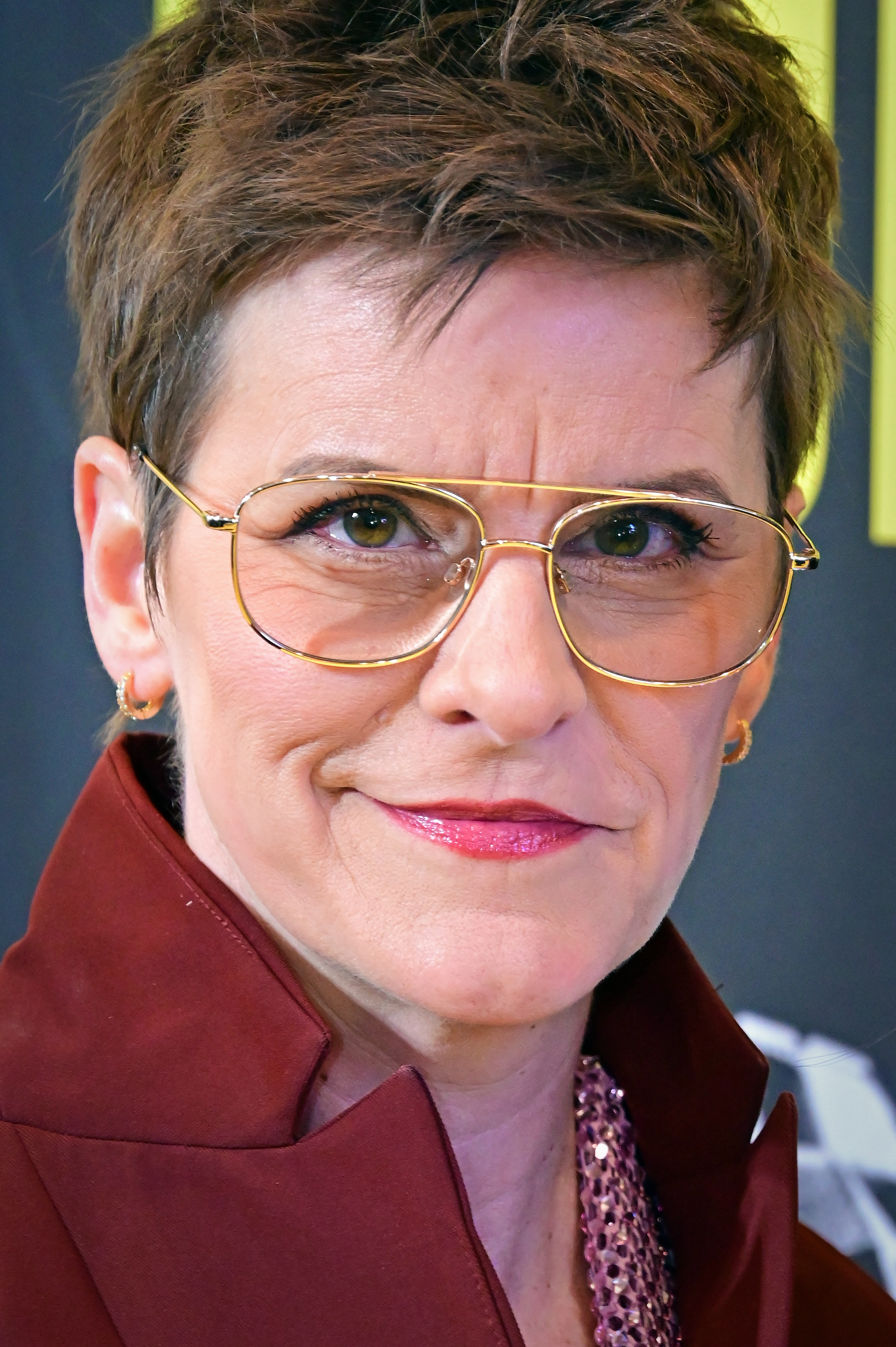
- Colella in 2026
- Born: Summerville, South Carolina, U.S.
- Education: Columbia College; UC Irvine (MFA)
- Occupation: Actress
- Known for: Come From Away
- Partner: Mo Mullen (engaged 2022)
- Children: 1

Jennifer Lin Colella is an American actress and singer. She is best known for her work in musical theatre.

She received a Tony Award nomination and won the Drama Desk Award, Outer Critics Circle Award, and three regional theater awards for her portrayal of Annette/Beverley Bass in Come from Away. She reprised her roles in the 2021 filmed recording of the musical.

Colella was in the original Broadway casts of Urban Cowboy, High Fidelity (2006), Chaplin: The Musical (2012), If/Then (2014) and Suffs (2024), and Off-Broadway original productions of Slut (2005) and Lucky Guy (2011). Her Off-Broadway work includes the title character in the Beebo Brinker Chronicles (2008), Closer Than Ever (2012), and a staged reading of Twelve Angry Men (2018) with an all-female cast.

In 2008, Colella performed in abridged versions of Girl Crazy and Side Show, two of the parts of Broadway: Three Generations at the Kennedy Center. The production celebrated the reopening of the renovated Eisenhower Theater. She also appeared in The Full Monty (2009) at the Paper Mill Playhouse in Millburn, New Jersey, and the American premiere of Take Flight (2010), her first pilot role, at the McCarter Theatre in Princeton, New Jersey.

Colella has performed in over a half-dozen world premiere musicals in the United States, including three at the La Jolla Playhouse in San Diego. She has appeared in four productions of Peter Pan. Additionally, she has been in multiple productions at the New York Musical Theatre Festival.

Colella has also done some television work; she appeared on the game show Can You Tell? in 2003 and An Evening with Lerner and Loewe, the initial Broadway in Concert Series installment on PBS in 2022.

== Early life ==
Colella was born to Lindy Crawford and Mick Colella, and grew up in Summerville, South Carolina. Starting at eight, she sang in church and school concert and show choirs, which were where she learned to harmonize. In church, she also played handbells. She refers to herself as a choir nerd. Her mother has said of the eight year old, singing as an auctioneer in a school play, "She took the microphone in her hand, looked right at the audience, and this voice came out." People wondered where all the sound came from.

A local woman gave theatre lessons in her garage, and to earn money to take the classes, Colella did odd jobs about the woman's house, including painting the exterior. Her first role was Gertie in Oklahoma!. In seventh grade, she had a hunter education class, which she says helped make it comfortable to handle guns when she performed in Annie Get Your Gun. When, as part of a school group, she saw Phantom of the Opera in New York, she decided that she was going to be on stage.

While an undergraduate at Columbia College, she played basketball, tennis and flag football. During her senior year, she quarterbacked. She graduated in 1996 with a dual degree in speech and drama. Her family had moved to Hilton Head Island and had a golf store there. While working at the shop one summer during college, she taught herself to juggle. She stayed in the area for three years and worked at an insurance company call center. In April 1997, she attended a Comet Carnival in Aiken, SC to observe Comet Hale–Bopp through a telescope. From 1997 to 1999 she was a member of The Sol Divers (initially The Gib Cats) rock 'n' roll band.

Colella served as a company member of the Trustus Theatre beginning in her senior year. At Trustus, starting in the fall of 1995 and running through the spring of 1999, she played Kitty in Taking Steps, The Angel in Angels in America (both parts), the title role in Sylvia (twice), Launcelot Gobbo in The Merchant of Venice, Amy in Company, Marta in Kiss of the Spider Woman, Teenage Greek Chorus in How I Learned to Drive, and Vivian in Free Will and Wanton Lust.

Colella went on to attend the University of California, Irvine, where she earned a Master of Fine Arts in Acting in 2002. While at UCI, she played Miss Jane in Floyd Collins, Puck in A Midsummer Night's Dream, Caterpillar in Alice in Wonderland, Princess Ninetta in The Love of Three Oranges, and Victoria Grant in Victor/Victoria at the Barclay Theatre. In 2000 and 2001, she did summer stock at the Santa Rosa Summer Repertory Theatre, playing Dorothy in The Wizard of Oz, Peter in Peter Pan, and Val in A Chorus Line.

== Career ==
=== Theatre ===
As a UCI graduate, Colella participated in a showcase in New York, along with NYU and Yale, and auditioned for a part. After going back to California for a few months, she got a call to come back to New York to audition for Sissy in the original production of Urban Cowboy, and was cast in her Broadway debut role. She had not yet gotten her Equity card. The world premiere was at the Coconut Grove Playhouse, in Miami, Florida. Then it moved to the Broadhurst Theatre for its seven and a half week New York run. When the show closed, she returned to California and co-hosted a game show.

Her Off-Broadway original cast credits include a six-week run as Delia in Slut in 2005, two weeks in 2011 as Chicky Lay in Lucky Guy at the Little Shubert Theater, and a seven week long engagement in the 2022 world premiere of Suffs at the Public Theater. Colella's Off-Broadway work also includes the butch title character in the Beebo Brinker Chronicles for seven weeks in early 2008, a four-week review, Closer Than Ever, during the summer of 2012, and a single performance, all-female cast staged reading of Twelve Angry Men in September 2018.

After being in the original staged reading in Connecticut in 2006, she appeared in Kiki Baby, as an "utterly believable" four year old singer "you will fall in love with," who becomes a celebrity—and a spoiled brat. This titular characterization won Colella a 2011 NYMF Award for Outstanding Individual Performance. Other New York Musical Theatre Festival appearances include The Great American Trailer Park Musical in 2004 and 2009's All Fall Down. In 2006 she starred in the world premiere of Twyla Tharp's The Times They Are A-Changin' at the Old Globe Theatre. An additional role was as Laura in High Fidelity. Colella played the world premiere in Boston in October 2006, and the original Broadway production in December of that year.

For her New York debut in Urban Cowboy, she earned a 2003 Outer Critics Circle Award nomination.

In Fall 2010, she also originated the role of Hedda Hopper in the world premiere of Limelight: The Story of Charlie Chaplin at the La Jolla Playhouse. It was renamed Chaplin: The Musical and she performed the role on Broadway from September 2012 to January 2013.

After the December 2013 world premiere run at the National Theatre in Washington, D.C., in March 2014, she started a year-long appearance in If/Then at the Richard Rodgers Theatre. Colella played Anne, a woman in a same-sex relationship with Kate. She had worked with the Kate role through development, but it was decided to cast LaChanze for the part. The role of Anne was then written in for her.

Among original Broadway productions, her longest run, starting in March 2017, was two and a half years in Come from Away. In the summer of 2015 Colella originated the role of Annette/Beverley Bass in the La Jolla Playhouse's world premiere production, which transferred later in the year to the Seattle Repertory Theatre. It then played Washington D.C. at Ford's Theatre, a concert presentation in Gander, Newfoundland, and at the Royal Alex in Toronto in 2016 before transferring to Broadway at the Gerald Schoenfeld Theatre. The show received positive reviews and she was nominated for a Tony Award, along with winning both a Drama Desk Award and an Outer Critics Circle Award for her performance. After three years of performing the role over a 4 1/2 year span, she left the production on November 10, 2019. During the summer of 2022, she returned as a replacement for seven weeks. She also returned for the final weeks of the production, in late September 2022, and performed in the last Broadway showing on October 2, 2022, to a sold out crowd.

=== Regional theatre ===
Colella has had multiple regional theater appearances. In addition to those listed above that moved on to New York, they have included her favorite role, Peter Pan, which she has done four times. Along with the 2001 California summer stock appearance, she has been cast in 2008 at the Sondheim Center in Fairfield, IA, the Music Circus in Sacramento, CA in 2015, and a 2019 Pittsburgh Civic Light Opera in Pennsylvania.

Also in Pittsburgh, she played Annie Oakley in Annie Get Your Gun in 2008. In 2009 she appeared, along with Elaine Stritch, in Paper Mill Playhouse's The Full Monty in Millburn, NJ. 2010 found her in Princeton, NJ at the McCarter Theatre in the American premiere of Take Flight as aviator Amelia Earhart. Another world premiere occurred in December 2003 for Madison Repertory in Wisconsin as Jenny in Heartland: The Musical, followed by a January 2004 appearance in the show for the Broadway Contemporary Series in Dallas, TX.

=== Comedy, film, and television ===
In the hopes of breaking into television, Colella began her career as a comedian as a way to get noticed. That, as well as the rock band, helped build her on stage confidence. She started doing observational humor stand-up in Southern California while pursuing her MFA. During that time, she performed in places such as the Laugh Factory and The Comedy Store in Hollywood. She has said that success and failure are equally valuable instructors.

She had her television debut in 2003 co-hosting the game show Can You Tell? with Tony Rock on Oxygen. Her next appearance was on the ABC series Cashmere Mafia, where she was in a same-sex relationship and discussed their starting a family. That show aired January 2008, six weeks before she opened in Beebo Brinker. Since then she has guest starred in several other television shows. In 2019, the year she left Come From Away, there were three for CBS, The Code, Madam Secretary, and Evil. Colella was also part of the PBS Tribute to Stephen Sondheim with the New York Philharmonic at Lincoln Center in 2010, and the initial Broadway in Concert: An Evening with Lerner and Loewe, again for PBS, in March 2022.

Her film credits are found in Uncertainty, Lay It Down for Good, the live filmed version of Come From Away, and Chocolate Milk.

=== Additional work ===
Colella has performed for online web shows. These include 2012's Pzazz 101 in the "Jenn Colella" episode and Hedda's Headlines: Backstage at 'Chaplin' with Jenn Colella where she reported from backstage over eight episodes of the Broadway.com Series. In 2014 she played Sarah Jeffreys in Submissions Only for two episodes titled "Chapter 2" and "Reason to Stay." 2017 saw her in another Broadway.com series over the eight episodes of Welcome to the Rock: Backstage at COME FROM AWAY with Jenn Colella. In 2021 she played Jo in all eight episodes of The Flame: A Podcast Musical.

In between other appearances, she teaches master classes, has a cabaret act, and does benefit performances. She sang the National Anthem at a New York Yankees game in October 2021. Colella has also co-written a song with Tom Kitt that was included in his album Reflect: Tom Kitt & The Collective.

=== Process ===
When Colella works on a project, she says she treats it as a hit and believes in it completely. But whether it is a hit is not the point, for her as an actor, it is to do her best work for as long as the show runs. She believes actors get hired not only because of talent, but because of their energy. She feels the energy that an actor brings into the room must be practiced throughout the day, working toward the foundation of present moment awareness. To her, "acting is the easy part, staying in the present moment in her work is harder and requires focus." She believes that acting is the same whether on Broadway or in a local theater.

She says there are only two things over which an actor has control—preparation and attitude. Her work ethic is to arrive at rehearsal with lines memorized and music learned. She works to understand what is going on and to develop ideas about her character. She thinks a production staff wants to trust that the actor will do the work and not appear for rehearsal unprepared. They also want to know the actor will be a team player, someone they will want to work with during a development cycle that may take several years.

Colella says she enjoys rehearsing more than performing. She has indicated she feels sad after opening night, when the creative team is not there anymore, as it is like mom and dad are gone. They are no longer there to guide and approve the work being done. She loves the energy and approval received from an audience, but the safety, community, and feeling of family within rehearsal is not the same.

She treats signing-in at the theater as a contract between herself and the others in the company to be her best self while there, and knows practicing kindness requires attention. She does not mark (Note: Marking is a singing technique employed to help save the voice from overwork.) in rehearsal, and has spent her career singing like it's the last time she'll sing.

== Personal life ==
Colella identifies as "mostly gay". She briefly dated fellow Broadway actor, Christian Borle in 2014. Colella became engaged to Mo Mullen in June 2022 and they married October 4, 2022. On October 30, 2023, the couple announced that they were expecting their first child together. Their daughter, Morrison Caroline Colella, was born on February 14, 2024.

Coming to New York, she was told by people she respected to stay in the closet, as it might cause casting problems. After playing a lesbian in The Beebo Brinker Chronicles, she began getting more attention and felt it was time to come out.

Manoel Felciano, a co-star of Colella's in the movie Uncertainty, wrote the song "Jenn Colella" about her.

After having seen The Phantom of the Opera on Broadway, she got a mask tattooed on her right arm. Her first Broadway show, Urban Cowboy, was in the theater next to the Phantom theater. Colella then got a star tattooed to represent Urban Cowboy and to cover the mask. (Note: The mask tattoo can be seen, although not clearly, in the photograph accompanying a 1999 article in The State showing the Sol Divers rock band, of which she was a member.) Two other visible tattoos, on the backs of her upper arms, read "Kindness" and "Gratitude," which she got while in Come From Away.

While working on Come From Away, Colella became friends with Beverley Bass, the airline captain she portrayed in the show. They first met in San Diego at James' Place, a restaurant across from the La Jolla Playhouse, after the last preview performance. At closing night for the Seattle tryout run, Bass presented her with the flight jacket, wings, and service pin that she wore on September 11, to be worn on Broadway.

== Credits ==
=== Stage ===
Year	Production	Role	Notes
2002	Urban Cowboy	Sissy	World Premiere; Performances: Coconut Grove Playhouse, Miami, FL (Regional), Nov. 16–Dec. 1
2003	Urban Cowboy	Sissy	Original Broadway Production; Performances: Broadhurst Theatre, Mar. 27–May 18
2003	Heartland: A Musical	Jenny	World Premiere; Madison Repertory Theatre, Madison, WI (Regional); Performances: UW Vilas Hall • Mitchell Theatre, December 5–28
2004	Heartland: A Musical	Jenny	Broadway Contemporary Series, Dallas, TX (Regional); Performances: Majestic Theatre, January 16–25
2004	The Great American Trailer Park Musical	Pippi	New York Musical Theatre Festival; Performances(6): Revelation Theatre, Sep. 28–Oct. 3
2005	Slut	Delia	Original Off-Broadway Production; Performances: American Theatre of Actors • Chernuchin, Oct. 1–Nov. 13
2006	The Times They Are A-Changin'	Cleo	World Premiere; La Jolla Playhouse, San Diego, CA (Regional); Performances: Old Globe Theatre, Feb. 9–Mar. 12
2006	Kiki Baby	Kiki	Original staged reading; Eugene O'Neill Theater Center Music Theatre Conference, Waterford, CT; Performances: Rose Barn Theater, July 15–21
2006	High Fidelity	Laura	World Premiere; Emerson, Boston, MA (Regional); Performances: Colonial Theatre, October 6–22
2006	High Fidelity	Laura	Original Broadway Production; Performances: Imperial Theatre, December 7–17
2007	The Becky Show	Performer	Readings, New York; Performances: Ars Nova, February 11, 12
2007	Don't Quit Your Night Job	Improve Player	Off-Broadway Improv; Performances: HA! Comedy Club, May 17–June 4
2007	Beautiful Girls: A Tribute to Sondheim	Performer	World Premiere Review; The Colorado Festival of World Theatre; Performances: Colorado College, September 22–23
2008	Beebo Brinker Chronicles	Beebo Brinker	Off-Broadway Production; Performances: 37 Arts Theatre B, Mar. 5–Apr. 27
2008	Annie Get Your Gun	Annie Oakley	Pittsburgh CLO, Pittsburgh, PA (Regional); Performances: Benedum Center, July 22–Aug. 3
2008	Girl Crazy (abridged); Side Show (abridged)	Molly Gray; Daisy Hilton	Broadway: Three Generations, as Act 1 and Act 3, respectively; Kennedy Center, Washington, D.C.; Performances: Eisenhower Theater, October 2–5 (reopening after a 16-month renovation)
2008	Peter Pan	Peter	Way Off Broadway Musical Theatre, Fairfield, IA (Regional); Performances: Sondheim Center for the Performing Arts, November 6–16
2009	The Full Monty	Georgie Bukatinsky	Paper Mill Playhouse, Millburn, NJ (Regional); Performances (with Elaine Stritch as Jeanette): June 10–July 12
2009	All Fall Down	Sarah Little	New York Musical Theatre Festival; Performances(6): 45th Street Theatre, October 9–18
2010	Beautiful Girls: A Tribute to Sondheim	Performer	Review; Manhattan School of Music; Performance: January 18
2010	Take Flight	Amelia Earhart	American Premiere; McCarter Theatre Center, Princeton, NJ (Regional); Performances: Berlind Theatre, May 13–June 6
2010	Limelight: The Story of Charlie Chaplin	Hedda Hopper	World Premiere; La Jolla Playhouse, San Diego, CA (Regional); Performances: Mandell Weiss Theatre, Sep. 7–Oct. 17
2011	Lucky Guy	Chicky Lay	Original Off-Broadway Production; Performances: Little Shubert Theatre, May 19–29
2011	I'm Getting My Act Together and Taking It on the Road	Heather	Off-Broadway Production, staged concert performance; Performances: York Theatre Company at St Peter's Church, June 19–26
2011	Piece of My Heart	Jessie	Workshop with performances; New York Stage and Film and Vassar College Powerhouse Theater; Performances(3): Martel Theater, July 29–31
2011	Kiki Baby	Kiki	New York Musical Theatre Festival; Performances(6): Theatre at St. Clement's Church, October 5–16
2012	Closer Than Ever	Performer	Off-Broadway Revue; Performances: York Theatre Company at St Peter's Church, June 20–July 14
2012	Chaplin: The Musical	Hedda Hopper	Original Broadway Production; Performances: Ethel Barrymore Theatre, Sep. 10, 2012 – Jan. 6, 2013
2013	If/Then	Anne	World Premiere; Performances: National Theatre, Washington, D.C. Nov. 5–Dec. 8
2014	If/Then	Anne	Original Broadway Production; Performances: Richard Rodgers Theatre, Mar. 30, 2014 – Mar. 22, 2015
2015	If/Then	Anne	Original Broadway Production; Performances: Richard Rodgers Theatre, Mar. 30, 2014 – Mar. 22, 2015
2015	Come from Away	Annette, Beverley Bass and others	World Premiere; La Jolla Playhouse, San Diego, CA (Regional); Performances: Sheila and Hughes Potiker Theatre, June 11–July 12
2015	Peter Pan	Peter	Broadway Sacramento at Music Circus, Sacramento, CA (Regional); Performances: Wells Fargo Pavilion, July 21–26
2015	Come from Away	Annette, Beverley Bass and others	Second out-of-town tryout; Seattle Repertory Theatre, Seattle, WA (Regional); Performances: Bagley Wright Theater, Nov. 18 – Dec. 20
2016	Come from Away	Annette, Beverley Bass and others	Third out-of-town tryout; Performances: Ford's Theatre, Washington, D.C. (Regional), Sep. 8–Oct. 9
2016	Come from Away	Annette, Beverley Bass and others	Concert presentation; Performances: Steele Community Centre, Gander, Nfld, October 29
2016	Come from Away	Annette, Beverley Bass and others	Fourth out-of-town tryout; Performances: Royal Alex, Toronto, ON (Regional), Nov. 24, 2016–Jan. 8, 2017
2016	Dear Evan Hansen	Virtual Community Voice	Recorded voice only
2017–2019; 2022	Come from Away	Annette, Beverley Bass and others	Original Broadway Production; Performances: Gerald Schoenfeld Theatre, Mar. 12, 2017–Nov. 10, 2019; Jun. 21–Aug. 7, 2022 (limited run replacement)
2018	Twelve Angry Men	Juror 12	Off-Broadway staged reading, all-female cast; Performance: Theatre Row • Acorn, September 16
2019	Camelot	Sir Lionel	Benefit Concert for Lincoln Center Theater; Performance: Vivian Beaumont Theater, March 4
2019	Peter Pan	Peter	Pittsburgh CLO, Pittsburgh, PA (Regional); Performances: Benedum Center, July 12–21
2019	Fun Home	Alison	Immersive, site specific reading; Quintessence of Dust Theatre Company; Performance: Plaza Jewish Community Chapel, December 19
2022	Suffs	Carrie Catt	World Premiere; Performances: The Public Theater • Newman, Apr. 6–May 29
2024	Suffs	Carrie Catt	Original Broadway Production; Performances: Music Box Theatre, Mar. 26–present

[top]

=== Television ===
Year	Title	Role	Notes
2003	Can You Tell?	Self	Co-host [Oxygen]
2008	Cashmere Mafia	Erika	Episode: "The Deciders" [ABC]
2009	Rescue Me	Singing Nurse #5	Episode: "Mickey" [FX]
2010	All My Children	TV Reporter	Episode #10300 [ABC]
2010	The Good Wife	Julie	Episode: "Bad" [CBS]
2010	Sondheim! The Birthday Concert	Self (Note: For Sondheim concert, singsYou're Gonna Love Tomorrow/Love Will See Us Through (at 28:35 min on DVD) with Cavenaugh, Osnes, and Steggert)	Great Performances on PBS
2015	Elementary	Blonde Group Wife	Episode: "All My Exes Live in Essex" [CBS]
2016	Feed the Beast	Val	6 episodes [AMC]
2019	The Code	Lt. Col. Judge Jette	Episode: "Lioness" [CBS]
2019	Madam Secretary	Valerie Guillen	Episode: "Daisy" [CBS]
2019	Evil	Cori	Episode: "2 Fathers" [CBS]
2022	An Evening with Lerner and Loewe	Self	Broadway in Concert Series [PBS] – March 6
2022	FBI: Most Wanted	DEA Agent Vanessa Ritchie	Episode: "Succession" [CBS]
2025	Elsbeth	Captain Kershaw	Episodes "Unalive and Well,” “Tearjerker” [CBS]

=== Film ===
Year	Title	Role	Notes
2008	Uncertainty	Emily	
2009	Lay It Down For Good	Rebecca	Short film
2021	Come from Away	Annette, Beverley Bass and others	Live film recording of the musical
2021	Chocolate Milk	Sue	Short film

=== Webcast ===
Year	Title	Role	Notes
2012	Pzazz 101	Jenn	Episode: "Jenn Colella"
2012	Hedda's Headlines: Backstage at Chaplin with Jenn Colella	Self	8 episodes, Broadway.com Series
2014	Submissions Only	Sarah Jeffreys	Episodes: "Chapter 2" and "Reason to Stay"
2017	Welcome to the Rock: Backstage at Come from Away with Jenn Colella	Self	8 episodes, Broadway.com Series
2021	The Flame: A Podcast Musical	Jo	8 episodes, series regular

[top]

== Partial discography ==
These include cast albums and collections with a Colella solo track.

Year	Album	Performer	Label	Ref
1998	The Gib Cat Sessions	The Gib Cats (original name of Sol Divers)	Pin Up Records	
1999	Ink	The Sol Divers	Pin Up Records	
2007	High Fidelity: A Musical	Original Broadway cast	Sh-K-Boom Records	
2007	This Ordinary Thursday: The Songs of Georgia Stitt	Various artists	PS Classics	
2009	Lost Broadway and More, Vol. 2	Various artists	Original Cast Records	
2012	Chaplin: The Musical	Original Broadway cast	Masterworks Broadway	
2012	Closer Than Ever	Off-Broadway cast	Jay Records	
2014	If/Then	Original Broadway cast	Masterworks Broadway	
2017	Bare Naked: Lynne Shankel	Various artists	Yellow Sound Label	
2017	Come From Away	Original Broadway cast	Concord Records	
2019	Beau	World premiere recording	Masterworks Broadway	
2021	Reflect: Tom Kitt & The Collective	Various artists	Masterworks Broadway	

== Awards and nominations ==
Year	Award	Category	Work	Result	Ref
2003	Outer Critics Circle Award	Outstanding Actress in a Musical	Urban Cowboy	Nominated	
2011	New York Musical Theatre Festival Award	Outstanding Individual Performance	Kiki Baby	Awarded	
2015	Craig Noel Award	Outstanding Featured Performance in a Musical, Female	Come From Away. San Diego, CA	Won	
2017	Helen Hayes Award	Outstanding Supporting Actress in a Musical – Hayes Production	Come From Away. Washington, D.C.	Won	
2017	Dora Mavor Moore Award	Outstanding Performance – Female	Come From Away, Toronto	Won	
2017	Tony Award	Best Performance by a Featured Actress in a Musical	Come From Away	Nominated	
2017	Drama Desk Award	Outstanding Featured Actress in a Musical	Come From Away	Won	
2017	Outer Critics Circle Award	Outstanding Featured Actress in a Musical	Come From Away	Won	
2017	Broadway.com Audience Choice Award	Favorite Featured Actress in a Musical	Come From Away	Nominated	
2018	Grammy Award	Best Musical Theater Album	Come From Away	Nominated	
2018	Grammy Award	Best Musical Theater Album	Dear Evan Hansen (for participation as Virtual Community Voice)	Won	
2022	Outer Critics Circle Award	Outstanding Featured Actress in a Musical	Suffs	Nominated	

== See also ==
- LGBT culture in New York City
- List of LGBT people from New York City
- NYC Pride March

== Notes ==
[top]

== Sources ==
- Wontorek, Paul (2017-03-29). "Show People: Jenn Colella of COME FROM AWAY". broadway.com (Podcast).
- Broadwaycom (2017-06-07). THE CATCH-UP: Christian Borle (CHARLIE AND THE CHOCOLATE FACTORY) & Jenn Colella (COME FROM AWAY).
- BroadwayCon 2018 (January 2018). Out on Broadway. Javits Convention Center, NYC.
- Davenport, Ken (2020-04-24). Comedian Jenn Colella Talks Originating Roles on The Producer's Perspective Live!.
- Bass: Savannah Performance Alliance (2020-05-21). SPP The Show - Jenn Colella.
- Ferrao, Nick (2021-01-04). "The Broadway Belters Podcast: The Power of Kindness (feat. Jenn Colella)". getpodcast.com (Podcast).
- Stage Door Medium (2021-01-11). S1E5 "And You Wonder, 'What If?'" Featuring Jenn Colella.
- Seales, Alan (July 2021). "Ep151 – Jenn Colella: Come From Away, "The Flame: An Original Podcast Musical"". spotify.com (Podcast).
[top]
