= Paprika (novel) =

1993 novel by Yasutaka Tsutsui

- Cover of the 2002 edition
- Author: Yasutaka Tsutsui
- Language: Japanese
- Genre: Science fiction
- Publisher: Chūōkōron-Shinsha
- Publication date: 1993
- Publication place: Japan
- Media type: Print (hardback & paperback)

Paprika (パプリカ, Papurika) is a 1993 science fiction novel by Japanese author Yasutaka Tsutsui. It first appeared in Marie Claire magazine in four parts, each appearing chronologically in the January 1991, March 1992, August 1992, and June 1993 issues. A manga adaption of the novel was created by Reiji Hagiwara in 1995 but was not published until 2003. The novel was adapted as an animated film in 2006, which was itself adapted into a second manga the following year by Eri Sakai. The novel was first translated into English by Andrew Driver, and published by Alma Books in April 2009. A new English translation by Helen O'Horan was published by Orion Books as part of the SF Masterworks series in October 2026.

== Story ==
Dream monitoring and intervention as a means of treating mental disorders is a developing new form of psychotherapy in the near future. Brilliant psychiatry research establishment employee Atsuko Chiba (千葉敦子, Chiba Atsuko) is the most prominent scientist in this field, using her alter-ego Paprika (パプリカ, Papurika) to enter the dreams of others and treat their illnesses. Her colleague, the brilliant and obese Kōsaku Tokita (時田浩作, Tokita Kōsaku) has created a super-miniaturized version of the Institute's existing dream-analysis devices calling it the DC Mini (DCミニ, DC Mini). Unrest ensues when the new psychotherapy device is stolen, allowing the assailant to enter the mind of anyone and enact mind control. The frantic search for the criminal and the DC Mini has begun.

== Characters ==
- Atsuko Chiba/Paprika – a beautiful but modest psychotherapist and lead researcher at the Institute of Psychiatric Research. When treating her patients she assumes her alter-ego, Paprika.
- Kōsaku Tokita – a brilliant and overweight colleague and friend of Chiba, with whom she is in love. He is the inventor of the DC Mini.
- Toratarō Shima – an administrator to the Institute who asks Chiba to bring out Paprika to help Noda's anxiety.
- Morio Osanai – a handsome but deeply amoral co-worker of Chiba, who harbors both jealousy and love for her.
- Tatsuo Noda – a prominent car company executive and an old friend of Shima who has anxiety.

== Adaptations ==
=== Animated film ===
An animated film adaption of the novel, directed by Satoshi Kon, was released in 2006, with Yasutaka Tsutsui himself providing the voice of a bartender.

=== Manga versions ===
- Reiji Hagiwara's version in Kodansha's Mister Magazine (from October 1994 to September 1995)
- Eri Sakai's version in Kodansha's Monthly Shōnen Sirius (from May to July 2007)

=== Live-action film ===
Wolfgang Petersen had the rights for a remake of Paprika.

=== Live-action television series ===
Cathy Yan will executive produce and direct a live-action television series adaptation of the novel for Amazon Studios and Hivemind.
