= Rachel deBenedet =

American actress (born 1967)

Rachel Helene Kasper deBenedet (born c. 1967) is an American actress and singer best known for her roles in musical theatre. In 2011, she was featured in the musical Catch Me If You Can on Broadway.

== Biography ==
Rachel deBenedet was born in North Newton, Kansas. Her father, Arlo Kasper, was a professional actor and Head of Drama at Bethel College in Kansas, where her mother was Professor of Voice. Her first live performance was at six years old in Germany, performing a recital. Her family lived in Germany for two years, as her dad was "on the running crew, the backstage crew at [a German] opera house". deBenedet then moved to Paraguay with her family, where they helped with musical theatre productions. Her father currently "directs and designs musicals and operas for semi-professional companies and universities in Paraguay".

DeBenedet graduated from Bethel College in 1988. After touring and performing in regional productions, deBenedet moved to New York City in 1998:

"I did two seasons [at the Music Theatre of Wichita in Kansas] getting my Actors' Equity Association membership candidacy points, then came directly after my second season there. I was here for eight months, and I was working. I worked at Theater Under the Stars in Houston and Paper Mill and places like that and then went on a tour. I left about eight months after I moved here, went on a bus-and-truck tour of Me and My Girl for a year, and then did another tour and then met my now ex-husband and moved to Colorado. I lived for about seven years in Colorado, and I would work in Seattle and TUTS in Houston and Sacramento Music Circus a lot while I lived in Denver. And, then in 1998, I came back here and was here for two weeks and got a Broadway show."

== Theatre and acting career ==
deBenedet made her Broadway debut in the revival of The Sound of Music, where she played one of the nuns. She then appeared in the Roundabout Theatre Company's production of the musical Nine. Other Broadway theatre credits include The Addams Family and Dirty Rotten Scoundrels. Regional credits include As Bees in Honey Drown and The Secret Garden at the Arvada Center, winning DDCC Awards.

She appeared in the 2007 Philadelphia and New York City productions of Christopher Durang and Peter Melnick’s Adrift in Macao, for which she won "Best Actress" at the Barrymore Awards for Excellence in Theater. The New York Times said, "Ms. de Benedet recalls Marlene Dietrich, only with Joan Crawford's brittle rectangular smile from the Warner Brothers years airbrushed into the mix." deBenedet also performed in the national tour of The Sound Of Music, receiving a Judy Award nomination, and Kiss Me, Kate at the North Shore Music Theatre, garnering IRNE Award nominations.

deBenedet then performed in the musical Turn of the Century in Chicago, Illinois, at the Goodman Theatre. This production ran from September 19, 2008, to November 2, 2008, directed by Tommy Tune.

In 2011, She played Paula Abagnale on Broadway in the musical Catch Me If You Can, which opened on April 11, 2011, at the Neil Simon Theatre, after beginning performances in March 2011. For this role, she was nominated for "Best Female Dancer, Broadway" at the 2011 Astaire Awards.
