= Side Show (musical) =

1997 musical

- Original Broadway theatre poster
- Music: Henry Krieger
- Lyrics: Bill Russell
- Book: Bill Russell
- Basis: The lives of Daisy and Violet Hilton
- Productions: 1997 Broadway; 2013 La Jolla Playhouse; 2014 Washington, D.C. 2014 Broadway revival 2016 Off West End

Side Show is a musical by Bill Russell (book and lyrics) and Henry Krieger (music) based on the lives of Daisy and Violet Hilton, conjoined twins who became famous stage performers in the 1930s.

The musical opened October 16, 1997, on Broadway; Robert Longbottom directed and choreographed, and the cast starred Emily Skinner as Daisy and Alice Ripley as Violet. Despite receiving some positive reviews, the show closed after 91 performances. A Broadway revival opened in November 2014, and closed after 56 performances.

== Synopsis ==
=== Act I ===
The Boss, the ringmaster of a sideshow, introduces the exhibits: the bearded lady, a geek, the Cannibal King, the seraglio of a Hashemite sheik, and, lastly, his star attraction, the Siamese twins ("Come Look at the Freaks"). Buddy Foster, an aspiring musician, brings Terry Connor, a press agent and talent scout for the Orpheum Circuit, to see the Siamese twins, persuading him to enter the show all the way. Coerced ominously in by the Boss, Buddy thinks he could help them create an act and convinces Terry to meet them. The two men interrupt a birthday party for the girls ("Happy Birthday To You And To You").

Terry asks their names and they respond, "I'm Daisy" and "I'm Violet". He then asks them their dreams ("Like Everyone Else"); Violet, the gentler of the two, wants a life of a husband and home; Daisy, on the other hand, seeks fame and fortune. Terry tells them he wants to help their dreams come true ("You Deserve a Better Life"). After the Boss rudely refuses Terry's offer to be cut in on the twins' potential vaudeville career ("Crazy, Deaf and Blind"), Terry devises a scheme whereby Buddy will teach the girls a song. Jake, who plays the Cannibal King in the sideshow and is the twins' friend and protector, begs them to consider what they're getting into and the whole sideshow family adds its opinion ("The Devil You Know").

Two weeks later, Terry returns to see the twins perform and Buddy tells him how the personal dynamics with the girls are getting sticky ("More Than We Bargained For"). Before their secret late-night performance, the twins confess to each other how infatuated they are with the two men who've come into their lives ("Feelings You've Got to Hide").

The Hilton Sisters' secret debut is a great success ("When I'm By Your Side"). But the Boss discovers the subterfuge and physically threatens the twins when they tell him they're leaving the sideshow. Jake comes to their rescue and the other attractions threaten to leave also, causing the Boss to back down. Daisy, Violet and Jake, whom Terry has invited to help backstage on the twins' tour, bid farewell to their sideshow family ("Say Goodbye to the Freak Show").

It's time for the twins' first public performance, and Terry invites a group of reporters together before the show ("Overnight Sensation"). Before their vaudeville debut, the twins argue about their different ways of expressing interest in men ("Leave Me Alone"). Onstage they sing "We Share Everything" in a production number featuring them as queens of ancient Egypt.

After the twins' performing triumph, Terry and Buddy shower them with kisses. Hostile reporters ask tough questions about the girls' love life ("The Interview"). Terry and Buddy deny any romantic inclinations, leaving the twins to wonder if they will ever find romantic fulfillment ("Who Will Love Me as I Am?").

=== Act II ===
The second act opens with the Hilton Sisters at the height of their success - a Follies-style production number ("Rare Songbirds on Display"). Daisy's dream of stardom has come true but Violet seems no closer to her dream of finding a husband.

At a fancy New Year's Eve party, Buddy tries to cheer up Violet and ends up proposing marriage ("New Year's Day"). Afterwards, Terry imagines what it would be like to be alone with Daisy ("Private Conversation").

In an onstage number ("One Plus One Equals Three"), Buddy, Violet and Daisy issue an upbeat invitation to their wedding. But backstage both Daisy and Buddy separately express doubts as to how the arrangement will work. Jake overhears Buddy and, in an effort to save Violet from seemingly imminent heartbreak, confesses that he has loved her for years ("You Should Be Loved").

The night before Violet and Buddy's wedding as the grand finale of the Texas Centennial, Daisy is feeling left out. To appease her, Terry suggests going where they could be more-or-less alone together ("Tunnel of Love").

The big day arrives. Hawkers sell tickets and souvenirs ("Beautiful Day for a Wedding"). But in the dressing area, complications arise. Jake announces he is leaving. Buddy confesses he's not strong enough to marry Violet. Daisy offers a solution which will ensure a movie contract dependent on the wedding publicity ("Marry Me, Terry"). Terry cannot bring himself to publicly acknowledge what he feels for Daisy. She dismisses him and insists that Violet and Buddy go through with the ceremony, which will at least benefit everyone's career. Left alone, the twins find solace in each other ("I Will Never Leave You"). As the wedding proceeds, they reprise "Come Look at the Freaks" with full understanding and acceptance of who they are and what they are doing.

== Musical Numbers ==
=== Original Broadway Production ===
Act I

- Come Look At The Freaks – The Boss and Company
- Happy Birthday To You And To You – Terry and Buddy
- Like Everyone Else – Daisy and Violet
- You Deserve A Better Life – Terry and Buddy
- Crazy, Deaf and Blind – The Boss
- The Devil You Know – Jake and Company
- More Than We Bargained For – Terry and Buddy
- Feelings You've Got To Hide – Daisy and Violet
- When I'm By Your Side – Daisy and Violet
- Say Goodbye To The Freak Show – Company
- Overnight Sensation – Terry and Reporters
- Leave Me Alone – Daisy and Violet
- We Share Everything – Daisy, Violet and Vaudevillian
- The Interview – Daisy, Violet and Reporters
- Buddy Kissed Me – Violet and Daisy
- Who Will Love Me As I Am? – Daisy and Violet

Act II

- Rare Songbirds On Display – Company
- New Year's Day – Terry, Buddy, Jake, Daisy, Violet and Company
- Private Conversation – Terry and Daisy
- One Plus One Equals Three – Buddy, Daisy, Violet, and the Vale Sisters
- You Should Be Loved – Jake and Violet
- Tunnel Of Love – Terry, Buddy, Daisy, Violet and Company
- Beautiful Day For A Wedding – The Boss and Hawkers
- Buddy's Confession – Jake, Daisy, Violet, Buddy and Terry
- Marry Me, Terry – Terry and Daisy
- I Will Never Leave You – Daisy and Violet
- Finale – Company

=== Broadway Revival Production ===
Act I

- Come Look At The Freaks – Sir and Company
- I'm Daisy, I'm Violet – Daisy and Violet
- Like Everyone Else – Daisy and Violet
- Very Well-Connected – Terry and Buddy
- Before The Devil You Know – Daisy, Violet, Attractions and Jake
- The Devil You Know – Jake and Company
- Ladies And Gentlemen – Buddy
- Typical Girls Next Door – Daisy and Violet
- Flashback – Auntie, Daisy and Violet, Doctors, Houdini, Sir, and Ensemble
- Feelings You've Got to Hide – Daisy and Violet
- Say Goodbye to the Sideshow – Violet, Daisy, Terry, Jake and Ensemble
- Ready to Play – Suitors, Daisy and Violet
- The Interview – Terry, Reporters, Daisy and Violet
- Buddy Kissed Me – Violet and Daisy
- Who Will Love Me As I Am? – Daisy, Violet and Attractions

Act II

- Stuck With You (Part One) – Buddy, Ray, Daisy and Violet
- Leave Me Alone – Daisy and Violet
- Stuck with You (Part Two) – Buddy, Ray, Daisy and Violet
- New Year's Eve Sequence – Terry, Buddy, Jake, Daisy, Violet and Company
- Private Conversation – Terry and Daisy
- One Plus One Equals Three – Buddy, Daisy, Violet, Ray, and Ensemble
- You Should Be Loved – Jake and Violet
- Great Wedding Show – Full Company
- Buddy's Confession – Jake, Daisy, Violet, Buddy and Terry
- Marry Me, Terry – Terry and Daisy
- I Will Never Leave You – Violet and Daisy
- Finale – Full Company

== Casts ==
Major Production Casts
Character	Original Broadway Cast (1997)	Kennedy Center Cast (2008)	Tokyo, Japan Cast (2010/2011)	First Broadway Revival (2014)	Original London Cast (2016)
Daisy Hilton	Emily Skinner	Jenn Colella	Sakiho Juri	Emily Padgett	Louise Dearman
Violet Hilton	Alice Ripley	Lisa Brescia	Kei Takashiro	Erin Davie	Laura Pitt-Pulford
Terry Connor	Jeff McCarthy	Max von Essen	Takanori Shimomura	Ryan Silverman	Haydn Oakley
Buddy Foster	Hugh Panaro	Bobby Steggert	(2010) Kanata Irei (2011) Tomohiro Yoshida	Matthew Hydzik	Dominic Hodson
Jake	Norm Lewis	Michael McElroy	(2010) Koujirou Oka (2011) Mitsuo Yoshihara	David St. Louis	Jay Marsh
The Boss/Sir	Ken Jennings	Michael Mulheren	Ken'ya Ōsumi	Robert Joy	Christopher Howell

== Production history ==
=== Original production ===
Side Show opened on Broadway on October 16, 1997 at the Richard Rodgers Theatre. Robert Longbottom directed and choreographed, the sets were by Robin Wagner, costumes by Gregg Barnes and lighting by Brian MacDevitt. The cast starred Emily Skinner as Daisy Hilton and Alice Ripley as Violet Hilton. Also featured was J. Robert Spencer. Despite receiving some positive reviews, the show closed on January 3, 1998 after 31 previews and 91 regular performances. Original producers were Manny Azenberg and former actor Wayne Rogers. The show was nominated for four Tony Awards in 1998 at the 52nd Tony Awards.

=== Regional theatre productions ===
In 1998, TheatreWorks near San Francisco produced the regional premiere of Side Show at the Mountain View Center for the Performing Arts. The production was a critical and popular success, receiving a Garland Award (Los Angeles) and various Dean Goodman Critics Choice Awards (San Francisco). The production was directed by Robert Kelley and Bick Goss (Goss also choreographed). Kristin Behrendt, who had been a standby for (and performed) the role of Violet in the original Broadway cast, played the role of Daisy. The cast also included Debra Wiseman (Bullets Over Broadway, The Scarlet Pimpernel) as Violet, AJ Vincent (The Will Rogers Follies) as Terry (Dean Goodman Critics Choice Award Best Actor in a Musical), Pierce Peter Brandt (Les Miserables, Martin Guerre) as Buddy, and Stephonne Smith (The Scarlet Pimpernel) as Jake.

In 2001, Signature Theatre Company's production starred Amy Goldberger (Daisy), Sherri Edelen (Violet), Will Gartshore (Buddy Foster), Matt Bogart (Terry Connor), Eric Jordan Young (Jake), and Michael Sharp (The Boss).

An abridged version of Side Show was presented at the Kennedy Center in Washington, D.C. October 2–5, 2008 as part of their Broadway: Three Generations production. Jenn Colella and Lisa Brescia played Daisy and Violet, respectively, Bobby Steggert played Buddy, and Max von Essen played Terry.

=== Revised version; Broadway revival ===
A revised version of the musical ran at the La Jolla Playhouse in La Jolla, California, in late 2013. Bill Condon directed, with Erin Davie as Violet and Emily Padgett as Daisy. The show had a "darker approach" and "incorporates new songs as well as additional biographical details of the Hilton twins' life and historical figures of the era." Several new songs were added. In Act 1, Terry sings "Very Well Connected" to try to convince the twins that he can get them booked on the Orpheum Circuit. Buddy teaches the girls a song called "Typical Girls Next Door". During a backstory flashback, British physicians sing "Cut Them Apart" while the girls sing "I Will Never Leave You" for the first time. Harry Houdini (Javier Ignacio) teaches the girls to tune out all distractions around them in order to get some private time ("All in the Mind"). When the girls are being brought to the US, Sir sings "Come See a New Land" ("Come Look at the Freaks" reworked). The twins' first big performance is a new song, "Ready to Play." Act 2 opens with a new number, "Stuck With You", featuring the twins, Buddy, and a boy with whom Buddy seems to be having a relationship. This is followed by "Leave Me Alone", moved to Act 2. "New Year's Day" was reworked and added to "New Year's Eve". "Tunnel of Love" was reworked as "A Great Wedding Show." Several other songs from the original were cut: "You Deserve a Better Life", "Crazy, Deaf and Blind", "More Than We Bargained For", "When I'm By Your Side", "Overnight Sensation", "We Share Everything", "Rare Songbirds on Display", and "Beautiful Day for a Wedding".

The production next played at the Kennedy Center in June and July 2014. with choreography by Anthony Van Laast, scenic design by David Rockwell, costumes by Paul Tazewell, lighting by Jules Fisher and Peggy Eisenhauer and sound by Kai Harada. The cast starred Davie and Padgett and also featured Matthew Hydzik as Buddy Foster, Robert Joy as Sir, Ryan Silverman as Terry Connor and David St. Louis as Jake.

The production began previews on Broadway at the St. James Theatre on October 28, 2014, opening officially on November 17, with the same cast. Despite very positive reviews, the revival did not catch on with audiences and closed on January 4, 2015 after only seven weeks.

=== London ===
The musical made its UK premiere in 2016 at the Southwark Playhouse in London for a limited run, running from October 21, 2016 to December 3, 2016. Directed by Hannah Chissick, the cast featured Louise Dearman (Daisy) and Laura Pitt-Pulford (Violet), with Dominic Hodson as Buddy Foster.

On March 3rd 2024, a concert production was staged at The London Palladium, starring Louise Dearman (Daisy) and Rachel Tucker (Violet). The cast also featured Bradley Jaden as Terry and Tosh Wanogho-Maud as Buddy. Adapted from the 2014 Broadway production, an edited book was presented with newly written narration to accompany the score, which was presented intact.

=== University Productions ===
The first collegiate production of the reworked version of Side Show was directed by VP Boyle and produced as an immersive theatrical experience by USC School of Dramatic Arts in October, 2016 and featured real twins. Daisy was played by Selene Julia Klasner and Violet by Carson Klasner.

== Awards and nominations ==
=== Original Broadway production ===
Year	Award ceremony	Category	Nominee	Result
1998	Tony Award	Best Musical		Nominated
1998	Tony Award	Best Book of a Musical	Bill Russell	Nominated
1998	Tony Award	Best Original Score	Henry Krieger and Bill Russell	Nominated
1998	Tony Award	Best Performance by a Leading Actress in a Musical	Alice Ripley	Nominated
1998	Tony Award	Best Performance by a Leading Actress in a Musical	Emily Skinner	Nominated
1998	Drama Desk Award	Outstanding Actress in a Musical	Alice Ripley	Nominated
1998	Drama League Award	Distinguished Production of a Musical		Nominated

=== 2014 Broadway revival ===
Year	Award ceremony	Category	Nominee	Result
2015	Drama Desk Award	Outstanding Revival of a Musical		Nominated
2015	Drama Desk Award	Outstanding Actor in a Musical	Ryan Silverman	Nominated
2015	Drama Desk Award	Outstanding Actress in a Musical	Erin Davie	Nominated
2015	Drama Desk Award	Outstanding Director of a Musical	Bill Condon	Nominated
2015	Drama Desk Award	Outstanding Sound Design	Peter Hylenski	Nominated
2015	Outer Critics Circle Award	Outstanding Revival of a Musical		Nominated
2015	Helen Hayes Award; For the Kennedy Center production	Outstanding Musical		Won
2015	Helen Hayes Award; For the Kennedy Center production	Outstanding Lead Actress in a Musical	Erin Davie	Nominated
2015	Helen Hayes Award; For the Kennedy Center production	Outstanding Lead Actress in a Musical	Emily Padgett	Nominated
2015	Helen Hayes Award; For the Kennedy Center production	Outstanding Ensemble in a Musical		Won
2015	Helen Hayes Award; For the Kennedy Center production	Outstanding Director of a Musical	Bill Condon	Nominated
2015	Helen Hayes Award; For the Kennedy Center production	Outstanding Choreography in a Musical	Anthony Van Laast	Nominated
2015	Helen Hayes Award; For the Kennedy Center production	Outstanding Costume Design	Paul Tazewell	Won
