= Robert Longbottom =

American choreographer (born 1957)

Robert Longbottom (born March 1957) is a New York City-based choreographer and director, primarily for theatre and opera.

== Early life ==
Longbottom was born and raised in Portland, Maine. He made his professional theatrical debut at age 8, appearing in the title role in Oliver! at the Brunswick Music Theater, now known as the Maine State Theater. He also played the roles of Winthrop in The Music Man, Patrick in Mame, and Tom of Warwick in Camelot.

On Broadway, he appeared in the revival of Little Johnny Jones in 1982 as various characters. He appeared in the original companies of 42nd Street Candy Co. and Me and My Girl (1986) as the stockbroker and in the ensemble. He understudied the role of Will Parker in the 1980 Agnes De Mille directed revival of Oklahoma! and played the role of Bobby in the European Company of A Chorus Line.

== Career ==
Longbottom made his Broadway debut as a director and choreographer with the original Broadway production of the Tony Award-nominated musical, Side Show in 1997.

Longbottom directed and choreographed the reconceived revival of Rodgers and Hammerstein’s Flower Drum Song on Broadway in 2002, with a new book by playwright David Henry Hwang following its premiere at The Mark Taper Forum, earning him a Tony Award nomination for his choreography, as well as Fred Astaire and Outer Critics Circle Award nominations, among others. Other Broadway work includes The Scarlet Pimpernel (1997) at the Minskoff Theatre and Bye Bye Birdie (2009) for the Roundabout Theatre Company, starring John Stamos.

He conceived, directed and choreographed the musical, Pageant in 1991 off-Broadway at the Blue Angel, which was nominated for four Outer Critics Circle Awards and a Drama Desk Award for Unique Experience.

Other work includes: Disney’s On The Record, Carnival! for the Kennedy Center, The Radio City Music Hall Christmas Spectacular, Show Boat in concert at Carnegie Hall (2008), Triangle at the Eugene O’Neill Center, South Pacific at The Muny, starring Howard Keel and Camelot at the Glimmerglass Festival, starring David Pittsinger and Nathan Gunn. Plays include Mister Roberts for the Kennedy Center and Hay Fever for the Old Globe. Longbottom staged a one night only benefit concert of Anything Goes for Lincoln Center Theatre, starring Patti LuPone, Howard McGillin and Boyd Gaines in 2002. He directed and choreographed Broadway Cares / Equity Fights Aids, as well as the three editions of The Easter Bonnet Competition.

He participated in the National Alliance for Musical Theatre Festival of New Musicals in 2008, directing Beatsville. He was the director and choreographer for the tour of Dreamgirls, which premiered at the Apollo Theater in 2009, prior to a US national tour. He was the director and choreographer of a production of La fille du régiment for the Washington National Opera in 2016. He directed the concert production of Into The Woods at the Hollywood Bowl in Los Angeles in July 2019.

Since 2005, Longbottom has devoted his time to mentoring high school students for Wendy Wasserstein’s "Open Doors" program (renamed the TDF Wendy Wasserstein Project in 2019). In addition, he conducts master audition classes in colleges and universities.
