= Broadway: Three Generations =

American musical

- Productions: 2008 Kennedy Center

Broadway: Three Generations is a musical composed of abridged versions of three other musicals, Girl Crazy, Bye Bye Birdie, and Side Show. It was presented October 2–5, 2008 at the Kennedy Center in Washington, DC.

Broadway was directed by Lonny Price and choreographed by Randy Skinner and Josh Rhodes. Kennedy Center President Michael Kaiser conceived of the musical over a year before it was performed.

Broadway was created in part to be a "splashy way to reopen" the Eisenhower Theater. The theater was renovated for 16 months for $17.9 million.
