= The Last Smoker =

"The Last Smoker" (Japanese: 最後の喫煙者, "Saigo no Kitsuensha") is a 1987 short story by Yasutaka Tsutsui. It has been adapted for television and radio. An English translation by Andrew Driver was published in the collection Salmonella Men on Planet Porno (ISBN 9780307377265) in 2008.

The story deals with the repression of dissent. It is set in a future Japan where smokers are persecuted to the point of extinction, and the last smoker is stuffed and preserved in a museum.

== Adaptations ==
=== Television ===
The story was adapted for television in Japan in 1995. Nine years after being broadcast it was said to have left a strong impression on audiences.

=== Radio ===
The English-language radio adaption is a 45-minute Loftus Production radio drama broadcast on BBC Radio 4 on 20 February 2009, picked that day as an editor's choice and listed as a "pick of the day". It was adapted by Julia Dover and the final program directed by Matt Thompson. The actors include John Byrne, Eileen McCallum, Madeleine Worrall, Stewart Conn, and Madeleine Brolly.
