= The Contemporary Theatre of Ohio =

Regional theater company in Columbus, Ohio

The Contemporary Theatre of Ohio (also called The Contemporary, and formerly the Contemporary American Theatre Company or CATCO) is a regional theater company in Columbus, Ohio. Operating under an Actors' Equity SPT 3+ contract, it produces a five- to six-show season that commonly runs from October through June and consists of contemporary, classic, and new works.

In January 1985, founding artistic director Geoffrey Nelson financed a production of Bill C. Davis's Mass Appeal at the YWCA under the company name Columbus Theatre Project. In 1986, CATCO was incorporated as a non-profit and the company converted a warehouse on Park Street in the Short North neighborhood to a theater. The Park Street location was CATCO's home until 1997 when CATCO became a resident theater company in the Vern Riffe Center for Government and the Arts in downtown Columbus.

The theater produces an annual playwriting fellowship. According to the company's 2017 call for submissions, "Playwrights who are Franklin County residents will be given preference, but any author may submit his/her work."

Leda Hoffmann became the artistic director in 2020, succeeding producing director Steven Anderson, along with executive director Christy Farnbauch.

In 2023, the company changed its name to The Contemporary Theatre of Ohio.

== Notable productions ==
- The Last Smoker in America
- The Santaland Diaries
- The Exonerated
- The Pillowman
- Evil Dead: The Musical
- Forbidden Broadway's Greatest Hits: Volume One
- Dirty Rotten Scoundrels
- Master Class
