= Peter Rodgers Melnick =

American conductor

Peter Rodgers Melnick (born July 24, 1958) is an American author and composer for film, television and musical theatre.

== Career ==
Some of Melnick’s earlier film score credits include L.A. Story, The Only Thrill, Convicts, and Farce of the Penguins. His television credits include the PBS's, Cinema's Exiles: From Hitler to Hollywood, Indictment: The McMartin Trial, Grand Avenue, and Lily Dale by Horton Foote.

His first produced musical was Adrift in Macao, featuring script and lyrics by Christopher Durang. Melnick then collaborated with Bill Russell on The Last Smoker in America, a musical comedy about a dysfunctional family struggling with a new law forbidding smoking. It opened in Columbus, Ohio in late 2010.

Melnick and Russell have also worked together on two musical one-acts, Patter for the Floating Lady, based on the eponymous Steve Martin, and A Bad Spell, adapted from a Virginia Moriconi short story Simple Arithmetic.

== Personal life ==
Melnick is the son of Daniel Melnick and Linda Rodgers, and grandson of Richard Rodgers and grew up in New York City. He graduated from The Choate School (which later merged with Rosemary Hall to become Choate Rosemary Hall) and attended Harvard College, Berklee College of Music, and the Guildhall School of Music and Drama. He also studied jazz with the Jaki Byard.

Melnick lives in Montecito, California, with wife, Talia Van-Son.

== Works ==
=== Musical theatre scores ===
- Adrift in Macao (2007)
- The Last Smoker in America (2012)

=== Film scores ===
- Vampire Knights (1987)
- Homesick, film short (1988)
- Get Smart, Again! (1989); TV movie
- Out of Sight, Out of Mind (1990)
- Bad Attitudes (1991); TV movie
- L.A. Story (1991)
- Convicts (1991)
- Only You (1992)
- In the Name of the Father, film short (1992)
- Running Mates (1992); TV movie
- Arctic Blue (1993)
- 12:01 (1993); TV movie
- Indictment: The McMartin Trial (1995); TV movie
- For Hope (1996); TV movie
- Grand Avenue (1996); TV movie
- No One Could Protect Her (1996)
- Two Mothers for Zachary (1996); TV movie
- Lily Dale (1996) TV movie
- Every 9 Seconds (1997); TV movie
- Jitters (1997); TV movie
- The Only Thrill (1997)
- Time to Say Goodbye? (1997)
- Becoming Dick (2000); TV movie
- Tak For Alt: Survival of a Human Spirit (2000); Documentary Feature
- Mermaid (2000); TV movie
- Taking Back Our Town (2001); TV movie
- Call Waiting, (2004)
- Farce of the Penguins (2006)
- Benjamin (2018)

=== Television scores ===
- The Death of a Star (1987) TV documentary
- The Mystery of the Master Builders (1988) TV documentary
- Nightingales (1989) TV series
- The KGB, the Computer and Me (1990); TV documentary
- Testing Dirty (1990); TV series: ABC Afterschool Specials
- Magic (1991); TV series
- Edgar Allan Poe: Terror of the Soul (1995); TV series documentary: American Masters
- Robert Rauschenberg: Inventive Genius (1999); TV series documentary: American Masters
- Cinema's Exiles: From Hitler to Hollywood (2009); TV documentary
- James McNeill Whistler: The Case for Beauty (2014) TV documentary
