= Takeshi Honda (animator) =

Japanese animator (born 1968)

- 本田 雄
- Born: March 12, 1968 (age 58); Ishikawa Prefecture, Japan
- Occupations: Animator; Designer; Anime director

Takeshi Honda (本田 雄, Honda Takeshi; born March 12, 1968 in Ishikawa Prefecture) is a Japanese animator, designer, and animation director.

Honda is one of Japan's outstanding animators. He is best known for his character design and animation directing work on Evangelion: 3.0 You Can (Not) Redo, The Boy and the Heron, Millennium Actress and Den-noh Coil. While Honda is an animator who draws realistic, theatrical characters, he also specializes in catchy "Bishōjo" characters. He was nicknamed Shisho (師匠, Shishō; lit. 'master') from the early days of his career. (Note: It all started when Takahiro Kishida called him so during the production of the 1991 OVA Bubblegum Crisis. Since then, many of his fellow animators and even directors have come to refer to him as such.)

Honda made his debut as an animator with the inbetweening for the 1987 OVA Relic Armor Legaciam and debuted as character designer on the series Metal Fighter Miku in 1994.

== Career ==
Honda moved to Tokyo from Ishikawa Prefecture to work in the animation industry after graduating from high school. After a brief stint at small studios such as Atelier Giga, he joined Gainax, where Hideaki Anno and Yoshiyuki Sadamoto worked. He debuted as an animation director in 1990 with Nadia: The Secret of Blue Water at 22, but then quit and moved to Studio AIC. However, Gainax soon recalled him to work on Uru in Blue. When the project fell through, he joined Neon Genesis Evangelion. He left Gainax again after the two Evangelion movies released in 1997.

After leaving Gainax, Honda began to work with other famous directors in the animation industry besides Anno, such as Satoshi Kon (Perfect Blue, Tokyo Godfathers, Millennium Actress), Mamoru Oshii (Ghost in the Shell 2: Innocence, The Sky Crawlers), Hiroyuki Okiura (Jin-Roh: The Wolf Brigade) and Kōji Morimoto (The Animatrix: Beyond). In 2007, he worked as character designer and chief animation director on Den-noh Coil, the directorial debut of Mitsuo Iso, with whom he worked on Neon Genesis Evangelion. However, he quarreled with Iso and dropped out after the first half of the series. (Note: Honda was credited as chief animation director until the final episode, but was actually absent for the second half of the series. His work was taken over by Toshiyuki Inoue and Yoshimi Itazu.) Honda soon afterwards joined Khara, which was newly established by Anno after he left Gainax, and worked with him again on the Rebuild of Evangelion film series. After working mainly as mechanical animation director on Evangelion: 1.0 You Are (Not) Alone (2007) and Evangelion: 2.0 You Can (Not) Advance (2009), he finally took over as supervising animation director on Evangelion: 3.0 You Can (Not) Redo (2012) with Honda at the centre of the production.

Honda moved to Studio Ghibli in 2017 to accept the post of animation director for Hayao Miyazaki's The Boy and the Heron. He had already been offered a position on the final film in the Rebuild of Evangelion series, Evangelion: 3.0+1.0 Thrice Upon a Time, but Studio Ghibli producer Toshio Suzuki approached director Anno directly, resulting in his transfer to Ghibli. It all started in the summer of 2016. He was approached by Hayao Miyazaki himself, who had long held him in high esteem, about taking part in his new film. (Note: It was not the first time that Honda had worked with Miyazaki, and at that time he was also the animation director for the short film Boro the Caterpillar, which was shown at the Ghibli Museum.) When Honda withheld an answer, he was summoned by Toshio Suzuki at the end of the year to discuss the matter. Honda concluded that he would work on both films, but he tried to arrange a meeting with Anno, believing that he should speak to him directly. However, six months passed with Anno avoiding him, and when he met with Anno in June 2017, perhaps having already had discussions with Suzuki, Anno gave him a curt attitude, as if to say he could do as he liked. After meeting with Anno, Honda was excluded from all meetings on Evangelion, so he decided to concentrate on Miyazaki's work and began actual production in July.

== Works ==
=== Anime television series ===
- Nadia: The Secret of Blue Water (1990–1991, animation director, key animation, ending animation on ep.39)
- Fatal Fury 2: The New Battle (1993, key animation)
- Metal Fighter Miku (1994, character design, ending animation, assistant animation director on ep.13, key animation on ep.13)
- Pretty Soldier Sailor Moon S (1994–1995, key animation on ep.14)
- Neon Genesis Evangelion (1995–1996, opening animation, animation director on ep.2, 8, 19, 22, 25, key animation on ep.1, 19, 25–26, Supplementary Setting on ep.15)
- Hajime no Ippo (2000–2002, key animation on Opening2)
- Di Gi Charat – Ohanami Special (2001, key animation on ep.1)
- RahXephon (2002, key animation on ep.15)
- Rozen Maiden (2004, key animation on opening)
- Paranoia Agent (2004, key animation on ep.8, 13)
- Windy Tales (2004, key animation on opening, ep.2)
- Beck: Mongolian Chop Squad (2004–2005, key animation on opening, ep.7)
- Gankutsuō: The Count of Monte Cristo (2004–2005, key animation on opening)
- He Is My Master (2005, ending support)
- Dennō Coil (2007, character design, chief animation director)
- Kill la Kill (2013–2014, key animation)
- Space Dandy (2014, key animation on ep.5)
- The Dragon Dentist (2017, key animation)
- Ingress (2018, original character design)
- Lazarus (2025, key animation)

=== Anime films ===
- Roujin Z (1991, key animation)
- Silent Möbius2 (1992, key animation)
- Memories: Magnetic Rose (1995, key animation)
- Neon Genesis Evangelion: Death & Rebirth & The End of Evangelion (1997, Eva series design, mechanical animation director on ep.25, key animation on ep.25)
- Perfect Blue (1998, key animation)
- Spriggan (1998, key animation)
- Jin-Roh (1999, key animation)
- Millennium Actress (2001, character design, animation director, key animation)
- Tokyo Godfathers (2003, key animation)
- Beyond (2003, character design, animation director)
- The Second Renaissance (2003, key animation)
- Ghost in the Shell 2: Innocence (2004, key animation)
- Naruto the Movie: Snow Princess' Book of Ninja Arts (2004, key animation, animation director, scene director)
- Tennis no Ōjisama – Futari no Samurai (2005, key animation)
- One Piece: Baron Omatsuri and the Secret Island (2005, key animation)
- Tales from Earthsea (2006, key animation)
- Evangelion: 1.0 You Are (Not) Alone (2007, key animation, Design Works, mechanical animation director)
- Ponyo (2008, key animation)
- The Sky Crawlers (2008, key animation)
- Evangelion: 2.0 You Can (Not) Advance (2009, key animation, Design Works, mechanical animation director)
- Pan-dane to tamago hime (2010, key animation)
- Legend of the Millennium Dragon (2011, key animation)
- From up on Poppy Hill (2011, key animation)
- A Letter to Momo (2011, assistant animation director, key animation)
- Evangelion: 3.0 You Can (Not) Redo (2012, key animation, Design Works, chief animation director)
- The Wind Rises (2013, key animation)
- When Marnie Was There (2014, key animation)
- The Boy and the Beast (2015, key animation)
- Classmates (2016, key animation)
- Maquia: When the Promised Flower Blooms (2018, key animation)
- Boro the Caterpillar (2018, animation director)
- Wakaokami wa shōgakusei! (2018, key animation)
- Evangelion: 3.0+1.0 Thrice Upon a Time (2021, original character design) (Note: He was not involved in the production of the film.)
- The Boy and the Heron (2023, character design and animation director)
- The Concierge at Hokkyoku Department Store (2023, key animation)
- The Imaginary (2023, key animation)

=== Independent films ===
- Uracon II Opening Animation (1983, character design, inbetweening)
- Uracon III Opening Animation (1984, character design, animation director, key animation, inbetweening)

=== OVA ===
- Relic Armor Legaciam (1987, inbetweening)
- Gunbuster (1988, key animation on ep.3–6, inbetweening on ep.1–2)
- Mobile Suit Gundam 0080: War in the Pocket (1989, key animation on ep.4)
- Gosenzo-sama Banbanzai! (1990, key animation on ep.5)
- The Hakkenden (1990, key animation on ep.5)
- Bubblegum Crisis Part 8 (1991, key animation)
- Mobile Suit Gundam 0083: Stardust Memory (1991, key animation)
- Doomed Megalopolis (1991, key animation on ep.1, 4)
- Otaku no Video (1991–1992, animation director, key animation on ep.1–2, opening ep.2)
- Giant Robo: The Day the Earth Stood Still (1992–1998, key animation on ep.1)
- Tenchi Muyo! Ryo-Ohki (1992–1993, key animation on ep.3)
- Oh My Goddess! (1993–1994, general animation director on ep.2, assistant animation director on ep.1, 4–5)
- Green Legend Ran (1992–1993, assistant animation director on ep.3, key animation)
- Dominion (1993–1994, key animation on ep.2)
- Macross Plus (1994–1995, key animation on ep.1)
- Oira Uchū no Tankōfu (1994, key animation)
- Elementalors (1995, key animation)
- Golden Boy (1995–1996, animation director on ep.2)
- Starship Girl Yamamoto Yohko (1996, key animation on ep.1)
- Detatoko Princess (1997–1998, key animation on ep.2)
- Blue Submarine No. 6 (1998–2000, animation character design on ep.3–4, animation director on ep.3–4, key animation on ep.1, 4)
- Vassalord (2013, key animation on ep.2)

=== ONA ===
- Japan Animator Expo: 20min Walk From Nishi-Ogikubo Station, 2 Bedrooms, Living Room, Dining Room, Kitchen, 2mos Deposit, No Pets Allowed (2014, original story, director (with Mahiro Maeda))
- Japan Animator Expo: Sokokara no Ashita (2015, key animation)
- Japan Animator Expo: Obake-chan (2015, key animation)
- Japan Animator Expo: Sora no Robo kara (2015, animation director, key animation)
- Khara Co., Ltd.'s 10th anniversary commemorative work: Good child's historical animation Ōkina Kabu (Big stocks) (2016, key animation)

=== Games ===
- Lunar: The Silver Star (1996, animation director)
- Tales of Legendia (2005, key animation)

=== Music video ===
- Yasutaka Nakata Portable Kūkō (2004, key animation)
- Yasutaka Nakata Soratobu Toshi Keikaku (2005, key animation)
- Yasutaka Nakata space station No.9 (2006, key animation)
- Mylène Farmer Peut-être toi (2008, key animation)
- 244 ENDLI-x Kurikaesu Haru (2008, key animation)
- Yui Aragaki piece (2009, key animation)
- Glay Je t'aime (2010, key animation)
- Shirō Sagisu Peaceful Times (F02)petit film (2013, key animation)
