= Watercolor (disambiguation) =

Watercolor painting is a painting method in which the paints are made of pigments suspended in a water-based solution.

Watercolor, Watercolors, Watercolour, or Watercolours may also refer to:

- Color of water, an intrinsic property of the covalently-bonded chemical substance
- Water Colors (album), the first album by Japanese songwriter Ayako Ikeda
- Water Colours, the debut studio album by the American electronica band, Swimming With Dolphins
- WaterColor, Florida, an unincorporated master-planned community located in Seagrove Beach
- Watercolors (Pat Metheny album), 1977
- Watercolors (Ducktails album), 2019
- Watercolors (film), a 2008 film by American director David Oliveras
- Watercolors (Sirius XM), a Sirius XM Radio music channel that specializes in playing smooth jazz
- Watercolour, a 2008–2012 built settlement and neighbourhood in Redhill, Surrey
- "Watercolour" (song), the first single from the third album Immersion by Australian drum and bass band Pendulum
- "Watercolour", a 2020 song by Indian singers Sanjeeta Bhattacharya and Dhruv Visvanath
- "Watercolors", a song by Janis Ian from her 1975 album Between the Lines
- The Watercolor, a 2009 Turkish animated film
- "Watercolors", a short story in the 1996 collection Dark Water by Koji Suzuki
