= Toshiyuki Inoue =

Japanese animator

Toshiyuki Inoue 井上俊之
- Born: July 7, 1961 (age 65); Osaka, Japan
- Education: Osaka Designer College
- Occupations: Animator, character designer
- Years active: 1982–present
- Known for: Akira; Kiki's Delivery Service; Ghost in the Shell; Jin-Roh: The Wolf Brigade; Tokyo Godfathers

Toshiyuki Inoue (Japanese: 井上俊之, Hepburn: Inoue Toshiyuki; born July 7, 1961) is a Japanese animator and character designer. He was the representative director of Japanese Animation Creators Association from 2014 to 2016. He is known as the "Perfect Animator", a title given to him by Mamoru Oshii. He is known for influencing the 'realist' style of animation in the 1980s and 1990s, along with animators like Hiroyuki Okiura, Shinji Hashimoto and Mitsuo Iso.

== Career ==
After reading a feature about Future Boy Conan from Animage magazine, Inoue decided to become an animator. He graduated from a vocational school and joined Studio Junio, his first work being on the Stop!! Hibari-kun! (1983) anime as an inbetweener. After just two years as an animator, he was promoted to character designer on the Gu Gu Ganmo (1984) TV anime. Subsequently, he became known for his freelance work as a key animator on feature films like Royal Space Force: The Wings of Honnêamise (1987), Akira (1988), Kiki's Delivery Service (1989) and Ghost in the Shell (1995).

Inoue animated the opening scene of Jin-Roh (1999). The characters in the scene are described as moving "with a verisimilitude that appears wholly natural and spontaneous, a level of realism which of course can only be achieved by painstaking attention to detail."

Inoue has worked together with Satoshi Kon several times, first on Katsuhiro Otomo's anthologies Roujin Z and Memories, and later on Kon's own films, Millennium Actress (2001), Tokyo Godfathers (2003) and Paprika (2006). There were plans for him to work on Kon's unfinished film Dreaming Machine as animation director as well. Kon considered Inoue to be an animator who had a major influence on him.

He has worked on several anime by studio P.A. Works, including The Eccentric Family (2013), Shirobako (2014) and Kuromukuro (2016), being brought in by studio founder and director Masayuki Yoshihara. His work on The Eccentric Family is described as having "just the right amount of exaggeration", knowing "when to keep the movements restrained and when to go all out."

His first work as "main animator" was in Maquia: When the Promised Flower Blooms (2018). As main animator, he contributed 120 cuts of finished key animation, 180 cuts of rough animation and 100 layouts for a total of 400 cuts. Inoue's ability to convey character without words impressed director Mari Okada, "when I flip through Mr. Inoue's layouts and key animation, without exaggeration, my heart races and I'm transported to a different world. I can't tell you how many times I uttered the word 'wow'. I was also surprised by the abundance of information that can be expressed in the pictures". Anime News Network reviewer Kim Morissey credits Inoue as the reason why scenes depicting war are "striking and hyper-detailed."

He would work again as main animator on The Orbital Children (2022) and as "chief animator" on The Deer King (2022).

== Creative philosophy and influences ==
Inoue believes that the original goal of animation was "to draw human movements", but due to commercialization, "anime-like movements were developed". With Jin-Roh he tried "to return to the original point of animation, which is expression through drawing" and "abandon the drawing methods that had to be used in commercial animation". As a judge in the 2019 Tokyo Anime Awards Festival (TAAF), Inoue abstained from declaring a winner at a student animation competition as the entrants had failed to "express pain using only movement, without relying on dialogue" and had instead used visual short-hand common in anime to express pain.

Inoue believes that a good animator should have "the ability to create a three-dimensional space on a flat surface, and to draw and move pictures freely within that space." This sense of "volumetric depth" is usually associated with full animation, however much of Inoue's work is limited animation.

Inoue refers to animator Yoshiji Kigami as being his "first concrete goal" in the industry. In an interview with NHK, he said "He struck me as a true professional with his skill and speed." "Even today 20 years later, I find that in some ways I still don't measure up to him."

Inoue and Mitsuo Iso are great admirers of each other's work. Inoue called Iso "a genius that nobody else can imitate." Iso referred to Inoue as "the person that I regard as my teacher" who influenced how he animates movements.

== Works ==
=== Animated television series ===
- Stop!! Hibari-kun! (1983–1984) Key animator (episodes 27, 32), Inbetweener
- Igano Kabamaru (1983–1984)
- Gu-Gu Ganmo (1984–1985) Character design, Animation director (episodes 7, 21, 26, 33, 39, 45), Key animator (episodes 1, 7, 15, 21, 26, 33)
- Prince of Devil's Island: Mitsume ga Toru (1985)
- Gegege no Kitaro (1985–1988) Key animator (episodes 4, 12, 26)
- Anpanman (1988-) Key animator (1 episode)
- Saber Marionette J (1996–1997) OP Key animator
- Super Doll Licca-chan ★ (1998–1999) OP1
- Wild Arms: Twilight Venom (1999–2000) OP Key animator
- Medabots (1999–2000) OP Key animator, Key animator (episodes 5, 47, 48, 52)
- Ghost in the Shell: Stand Alone Complex (2002) (3 episodes)
- Mahoromatic (2002–2003) Key animator (episode 1)
- This Ugly yet Beautiful World (2004) Key animator (episode 1)
- Paranoia Agent (2004) Effects animation director (episode 13), Animation director cooperation (8 episodes), Key animator (episodes 1, 8, 13)
- Gankutsuou: The Count of Monte Cristo (2004–2005) (episodes 2, 12)
- Ghost in the Shell S.A.C. 2nd GIG (2004–2005) Key animator (episodes 4, 7, 18)
- Otogi Zoshi (2004–2005) OP1 Key animator
- Dennou Coil (2007) Chief animation director, Animation director (Episodes 11, 14, 16, 17, 21, 26), Key animator (OP, episodes 1, 2, 4, 5, 9, 11, 14, 16, 17, 18, 20, 21, 24, 26)
- Usagi Drop (2011) Key animator (episode 9)
- Eccentric Family (2013) Animation director (episode 3), Key animator (episode 3,12)
- Shirobako (2014) Key animator (episode 12)
- Haikyuu!! (2014) Key animator (episode 25)
- Kuromukuro (2016) Key animator (episode 1)

=== Films ===
- Dr. Slump and Arale-chan: Hoyoyo! The Great Race Around the World (1983) Inbetweener
- Gu Gu Ganmo (1985) Animation director
- Barefoot Gen 2 (1986) Key animator
- The Foxes of Chironup Island (1987)
- Twilight of the Cockroaches (1987)
- Royal Space Force: The Wings of Honnêamise (1987)
- AKIRA (1988)
- Kiki's Delivery Service (1989)
- Fly! Peek the Whale (1991) Assistant animation director, Key animator
- Only Yesterday (1991)
- Roujin Z (1991)
- Hashire Melos (1992)
- Macross 7: The galaxy is calling me! (1995)
- Ghost in the Shell (1995)
- Memories (1995) Character design, Animation director
- Jin-Roh: The Wolf Brigade (1999) Secondary animation director, layout check, Key animator
- Blood: The Last Vampire (2000)
- Millennium Actress (2001) Animation director, Key animator
- A Tree of Palme (2002) Character Design, Key animator
- Tokyo Godfathers (2003) Animation director, Key animator
- Steamboy (2004)
- Ghost in the Shell 2: Innocence (2004)
- Inuyasha the Movie: Fire on the Mystic Island (2004)
- Paprika (2006) Assistant animation director, Key animator
- The Sky Crawlers (2008)
- Fullmetal Alchemist: The Sacred Star of Milos (2011) Assistant animation director
- A Letter to Momo (2012) Secondary animation director, Key animator
- Wolf Children (2012) Key animator
- Evangelion: 3.0 You Can (Not) Redo Animation director, Key animator
- Giovanni's Island (2014)
- Miss Hokusai (2015)
- The Boy and the Beast (2015) Key animator
- Napping Princess (2017)
- Maquia: When the Promised Flower Blooms (2018) Main animator, Sub-character design, Assistant animation director, Key animator
- Evangelion: 3.0+1.0 Thrice Upon a Time (2021) Key animator
- The Orbital Children (2022) Main animator, Animation director, Animation director, Original Animation
- The Deer King (2022) Chief animator and Assistant animation director (Co-)
- THE FIRST SLAM DUNK (2022)
- Lonely Castle in the Mirror (2022) Key animator
- The Boy and the Heron (2023) Key animator

=== OVA ===
- Cream Lemon PART4 POPCHASER (1985) Key animator (under the name of Toshiyuki Inoue)
- Record of Lodoss War (1990) Key animator (episode 1), Opening Animation
- Ninja Ryukenden (1991)
- 3×3 Eyes (1995)
- Blue Submarine No. 6 (1999–2000) Animation Director (episode 4), Key animator (episode 4)

=== Games ===
- Time Gal (1985) Key animator
- Ghost in the Shell (1997)
- Tales of Eternia (2000) OP Key animator
- Wild Arms 3 (2002) OP Key animator

=== Pilot film ===
- The 2 Queens (2013)

== In popular culture ==
In the first episode of Keep Your Hands Off Eizouken!, the character Tsubame rushes home to watch a fictional anime by "the dream team, Inoue-san, Iso-san and Ohira-san" referring to Toshiyuki Inoue, Mitsuo Iso and Shinya Ohira.

Inoue appears in the documentary "Hand-Drawn" along with Mamoru Hosoda and Mitsuo iso.
