= Lunar Soup =

Studio album by Ayako Ikeda
- Released: July 6, 2005
- Recorded: PrimeSound studio AOYAMA, Sound Valley studio, PickUp studio, AMG studio, PAPA X studio, PAPA T studio
- Genres: Pop, contemporary
- Length: 60:00
- Label: Universal Japan
- Producers: Ayako Ikeda, Atsushi Kitamura

Ayako Ikeda chronology
Water Colors (2002)	Lunar Soup (2005)

Lunar Soup is the second album by Japanese song writer Ayako Ikeda. It was released in Japan on July 6, 2005. This album includes her third, fourth, and fifth singles, "Hanabira" (はなびら), "I will", and "Bokutachi no Tomorrow" (僕たちのTomorrow), as well as an acoustic re-release of her second single, "Life".

== Track listing ==
All lead vocals were sung by Ayako Ikeda, and arranged by Tatoo.

1. Michi yuku Sora (道ゆく空) - 3:54
2. Timeless - 4:45
3. Ai no kotoba (愛の言葉) - 4:52
4. Shinkokyuu hitotsu (深呼吸ひとつ) - 3:54
5. Hanabira (はなびら) - 5:34
6. Mikaduki (三日月) - 5:01
7. Shiroi gifuto (白いギフト) - 4:18
8. Sotto kisu shiyou (そっとキスしよう) - 4:37
9. Silver Moon - 4:37
10. I will - 4:41
11. Odayaka na koi (穏やかな恋) - 3:37
12. Asahi no naka de (朝陽の中で) - 5:14
13. Bokutachi no Tomorrow (僕たちのTomorrow) - 4:48
14. Life - 4:22

== Personnel ==
- Ayako Ikeda - lead and background vocals, wurlitzer
- Akihisa Kominato - bamboo flute
- Yasuharu Nakanishi - piano
- Kumiko Hasegawa - piano, background vocals
- Tatoo - piano, keyboard, rhodes, background vocals
- Chica - violin
- Keigo Shiga - violin
- Mio Okamura - violin
- To-ru Meki - guitar
- Taguchi Penguin - bass
- Tomoyuki Yamada - percussion
- Katsumi Takabayashi - drums
- Ria (Sara de Patti) - background vocals
- The PAPA X All Stars - background vocals
