= Mitsuo Iso =

Japanese animator, screenwriter, director, animation director (1966-)

- 磯 光雄
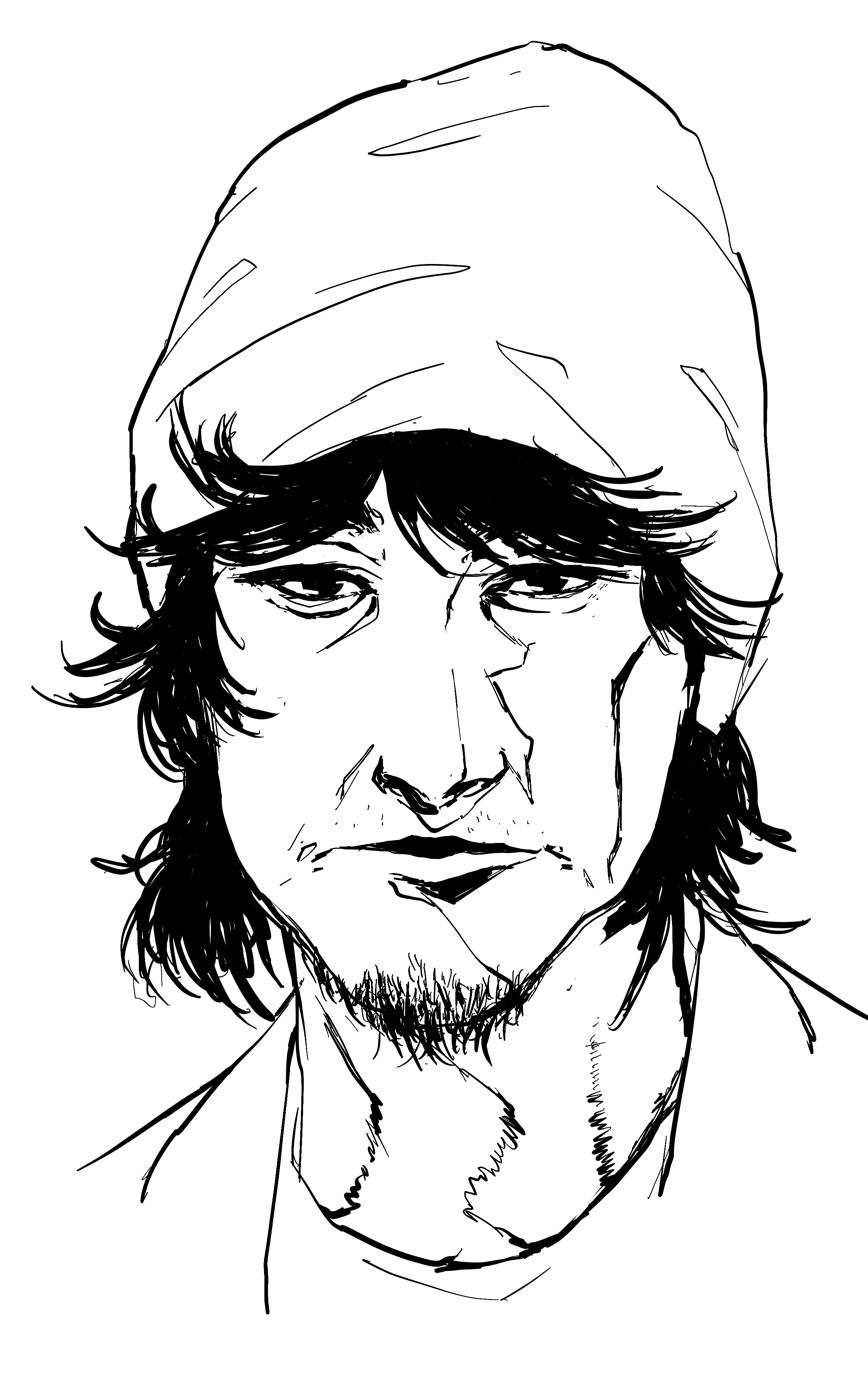
- Pronunciation: Iso Mitsuo
- Born: 1966 (age 59–60); Aichi, Japan
- Other names: 小田川 幹雄, 贄田 秀雄, MISSILE☆MAX (Mikio Odagawa, Hideo Nieda)
- Occupations: Animator, Animation director, Filmmaker, Screenwriter, Cinematographer
- Years active: 1985-present
- Known for: Dennō Coil
- Website: IMAGO-IMAGE

Mitsuo Iso (磯 光雄, Iso Mitsuo; born 1966 in Aichi, Japan) is a Japanese animator and director. He worked as a freelance artist through Neomedia, Studio Zaendo, and Studio Ghibli. When he participates in anime works as an animator, he sometimes uses aliases such as Mikio Odagawa and Hideo Tateda, or does not give his name.

Iso is known for his offbeat key animation in the prologue of Gundam 0080, large portions of Asuka's battle in The End of Evangelion and the first half of the tank battle in Ghost in the Shell.

As a director, Den-noh Coil, a science fiction TV Animation series for which he wrote the original story and screenplay, storyboarded and directed, won the 29th Nihon SF Taisho Award, the 39th Seiun Award Best Dramatic Presentation, the Japan Media Arts Festival Animation Division Excellence Award, and the 7th Tokyo Anime Award TV Animation Division Excellence Award.

== Career ==
After dropping out of university, Iso began working as an animator in the mid-1980s.

He joined the 1988 film Mobile Suit Gundam: Char's Counterattack. He was credited as a key animator under both his real name and pen name Mikio Odagawa, and also served as mechanical animation director under the name Odagawa. (Note: He was offered the job directly by the animation studio Sunrise because of his past participation in the Gundam TV series, and he initially worked without going through his studio at the time, Zaendo. However, he was then asked by Sunrise to act as an intermediary for job offers to the company, and worked under his real name as a job through the company. As a result, he ended up working under both a pen name and his real name.)

The battle scene at the beginning of the 1989 OVA Mobile Suit Gundam 0080: War in the Pocket made a strong impression on the anime industry and anime fans about Iso. (Note: Until then, mobile suits (giant humanoid robots) had mostly been depicted as costumed humans or as a whole mass. However, Iso thought that if the robot's torso was a machine, it needed to be separated from the skeleton (chassis), so he drew it so that its materials and structure could be imagined. He then used camera angles that made the viewer look far up into the sky to show the horror of the giant weapon. He also carefully picked up every detail of secondary effects, such as air resistance during missile launch and vehicles floating in the blast, to create realistic combat scenes. In this work, an explosion effect called "Iso Explosion" is noticeable.) The scenes Iso drew in what he called a 'full-limited' manner shocked animators of the time, so much so that a collection of copies of key animations was circulated. Director Fumihiko Takayama gave him the opportunity to do some niche design work, and he designed some of the mechanics and military equipment.

He was with Studio Ghibli from 1990 to 1992. He was recruited directly by Hayao Miyazaki of Studio Ghibli, who saw his work on the television film Like the Clouds, Like the Wind (1990), which many Ghibli staff participated in. Iso drew keyframes in Only Yesterday, Porco Rosso, Ocean Waves.

Iso joined Roujin Z (1991), based on Katsuhiro Otomo's manga, as a mechanical animation director at the request of director Hiroyuki Kitakubo. However, he was not involved in the actual production as he was asked to participate in Only Yesterday at the meeting stage. He then only worked on additional designs at the request of Kitakubo.

After leaving Ghibli, he lived in Shanghai for four months to work on Madhouse's OVA Final Fantasy: Legend of the Crystals. He then joined in the omnibus animation film Memories (1995), for which Katsuhiro Otomo was the executive producer and general director. He received an offer from Studio 4°C to work on props for Episode 1: Magnetic Rose, directed by Kōji Morimoto. He also participated in the planning meetings for Morimoto's Noiseman Sound Insect (1997).

Iso joined the Neon Genesis Evangelion television series (1995–1996) and the film (1997). As an animator, he drew scenes for episodes 1 (Note: The urban battle between Sachiel and the UN forces.) and 19 (Note: The scene where EVA Unit-01 preys on Zeruel.) of the TV series, episode 21 (Note: Additional scenes.) of the video format version, and the movie The End of Evangelion (Note: The battle between EVA Unit-02 and EVA Mass Production Units. He drew the scene with thorough attention to the basis of the movement, such as the hardness of the scaffolding and the weight of the handheld weapons, and also added various innovations, such as shooting handheld camera style with blurring and shaking to move the viewpoint.) (episode 25 of the video version). He initially joined the project as an animator, but the storyline from the middle of the series onwards was largely undefined at that point. So he came up with various plots and ideas and proposed them to director Hideaki Anno. His plot for episode 13 was then adopted, and he co-wrote the script with Anno and screenwriter Akio Satsukawa. (Note: Iso's first draft was too long, so Satsukawa summarized it, and director Anno made some changes. The ending of the final draft was somewhat disappointing for Iso, as Anno used an idea that Iso had intended to use in another episode as a punchline.) Iso also created the supplementary settings for episodes 13 and 15, including the design of Lilith and Seele marks, rough sketches of underground facilities, etc. Apart from those, Iso also provided settings and ideas for the entire series, albeit uncredited, and many of the dialogues and plots he created were used in the middle and later episodes of the TV series. (Note: Apart from the script for episode 13, what was adopted for the series was the story line from the middle to episode 19, the plot of the first half of episode 22 and episode 24, and detailed ideas for each episode. The film accepted scenes of the Self-Defence Forces fighting Evangelion.) Iso's idea for the plot of the last episode was not adopted, so he diverted part of it to the final episode of Den-noh Coil. (Note: Iso's proposed storyline up to the final episode was that Asuka's (or Rei's) Evangelion explodes, 12 angels descend on NERV headquarters, Shinji and Gendo head to the ancient ruins beneath the headquarters in their respective Evangelions, where they meet Yui again, and finally Shinji dives inside the Evangelion and revives Asuka (or Rei), who has lost her physical body and fused with her Evangelion.)

In Ghost in the Shell (1995), he not only drew the key animations, but also designed all the firearms. (Note: Oshii saw Iso's past work and mistook him for a gun enthusiast and approached him. However, he actually did not have a very good image of guns and did not know the basics, so he studied guns anew.) As an animator, Iso was in charge of the shoot-out at the museum between the main character Motoko Kusanagi and the multi-legged tank. In order to draw the spider-like tank, he actually captured a live spider and placed it in a beaker to observe its complex leg movements, centre of gravity shifts and other behaviour all day. The layouts were filled with detailed explanations, instructions and requests to the art direction, and sometimes this was not enough, so he went directly to the art director for explanations and meetings.

In FLCL (2000), he drew the key animations. He worked with director Kazuya Tsurumaki for about six months on a preliminary project, titled Furi Chiru. Some of his ideas were adopted, but the project itself was never realised. This is because Iso created most of the settings and storylines, although Tsurumaki came up with the terminology and character names.

Iso joined Blood: The Last Vampire (2000), which marked the beginning of the trend towards digital animation production in Japan. He worked in visual effects as well as key animation. He negotiated directly with director Hiroyuki Kitakubo and accepted the key animation on condition that he would handle the entire process, including visual effects and cinematography (digital compositing). He then completed all of his own keyframe parts using self-taught After Effects. (Note: This was thanks to Production I.G.'s introduction of computers in the studio, which enabled the key animators themselves to add special effects to the keyframes, a task previously left to the cinematographer.) Director Quentin Tarantino made a live-action film Kill Bill: Volume 1 (2003), inspired by this work, and asked Production I.G to produce the animated inserts, which Iso also participated in.

In RahXephon (2002), Iso worked as Digital Works and cinematographer positions throughout this television series. As for Digital Works, he retouched key animations and art with special effects and computer graphics. As a cinematographer, he prepared samples of images in advance and coordinated between the episode directors and the cinematography studio. In episode 15 (The Children's Night), he wrote the script, storyboarded, and directed, and was also in charge of some of the drawing and cinematography, overseeing a cross-section of jobs that were originally divided. (Note: Episode 15, known as "The Iso Episode".) This was the first time he had worked on storyboarding and directing, and this process was like making a whole short film. He decided to join the work on the condition that he would work on an entire episode by himself.

In 2007, Iso directed his first animated television series, Dennō Coil. He wrote the original story and the screenplay for all the episodes, and won the Nihon SF Taisho Award and the Seiun Award as a science fiction writer. The work depicts everyday life in the near future, when wearable devices called Dennō Glasses have become widespread, and has had a profound influence on later XR technicians and artists. The project had been in the pipeline since around 2000 and finally came to fruition after seven years with the cooperation of producer Sanae Mitsugi of Tokuma Shoten and producer Masao Maruyama of Madhouse (at the time).

In 2016, he gave a presentation introducing his original animation projects Les pirates de la Réunion et les dodos (レユニオンの海賊とドードー鳥, Re-Yunion no Kaizoku to DōDō-dori; lit. The Pirates of the Reunion and the Dodos) and The Orbital Children (地球外少年少女, Chikyūgai Shōnen Shōjo; lit. Extraterrestrial Boys and Girls) in a series in an anime magazine. In the same year, Iso and French animation studio yapiko animation announced at Japan Expo 2016 that they would jointly produce Les Pirates de la Reunion Le Reveil des dodos. However, the project has been put on hold because The Orbital Children project preceded this one.

Iso announced the production of The Orbital Children in 2018, and began full-scale production of the film in 2020. The Orbital Children was released exclusively worldwide on Netflix on 20 January 2022, and was released in theatres in Japan as a two-part film, the first part on the same day as Netflix and the second part on 11 February 2022. He wrote the original story and screenplay for the work, and directed it. He is also credited for the cinematography. Kenichi Yoshida was brought on as character designer and Toshiyuki Inoue as main animator.

== Style ==
=== As an animator ===
Mitsuo Iso is known for his jerky yet detailed animation, full of dense sophisticated motion. He refers to his own style as "full limited". In traditional animation, animation with a drawing count below one drawing every two frames (or "on twos") is considered limited animation. Mixing twos, threes and fours in a balanced form of timing, Iso draws every keyframe without passing his work to an in-betweener, allowing him full control to create the most detailed motion possible with a balanced and efficient number of drawings, hence the term "full limited". Iso's idea of "full limited" is a method for controlling the image from the animator's standpoint, and he has the calculation that if he draws everything in key animation, the timesheets will not be modified by the director.

Iso is one of the animators who played a central role in the movement from the late 1980s to the 1990s, when the expression of "realistic" animation matured in the Japanese animation industry. He has changed the technique of animation and has done so many times. His thoroughgoing style of painting has won him high praise not only from anime fans, but also from fellow animators. He has pioneered new expressions in animation with movements that give a sense of the mass and inertia of objects, and effects such as explosions, smoke and flames, and has influenced many creators. The methods of depicting clods of earth, rocks and other debris as a coherent mass, or depicting explosions as moving in three dimensions, were copied by everyone and became the industry standard. His drawings are very realistic and photorealistic, and the reality of his movements comes from his thorough, scientific observation. His drawing philosophy of building up a series of possible phenomena on the screen had a major influence on later realistic drawing. On the other hand, he has never abandoned the appeal of animation, such as entertainment and showiness.

Under directors with varied artistic backgrounds, including Hayao Miyazaki, Isao Takahata, Yoshiyuki Tomino, Hideaki Anno, Satoshi Kon and Katsuhiro Otomo, Iso has worked not only as a key animator but also in various positions, including animation director, scriptwriter, mechanical and firearms designer, digital works, setting development and visual effects. What distinguishes him as an animator is his willingness to go beyond the confines of his section, which has allowed him to pioneer a new expression of animation. He has covered a wide variety of genres and professions, and has demonstrated his talent in each of them. Since the production site of commercial animation is a race against time, the division of labor is common, with each process divided into smaller sections and job categories defined so as not to encroach on each other's job areas. However, he believes that being aware of the processes before and after the work enhances the overall quality of the work, so he crosses sectional boundaries and is involved in every step of the process, from scriptwriting and storyboarding to layout and drawing, to ensure the work is completed as he wants it to be. Iso has a consistent orientation of wanting to dig deep and touch something that lies at the root of a work, even if it is someone else's work. This is in line with his orientation as an animator to deconstruct the principles of movement. The visual image that integrates the world view, setting, design, drawing, and cinematography of the work was already in his mind when he was working on other directors' works. On the other hand, he has too many things he wants to do to fit in one staff member and tends to make other directors' work his own.

Every time Iso makes a new work, he takes on a new role other than animator, such as screenplay for Evangelion, cinematographer for Blood: The Last Vampire, and direction for RahXephon, new techniques such as digital animation, computer graphics, and special effects, new drawing tools and software. He was one of the first animators to actively adopt digital technology, and when the animation production system shifted from analogue to digital, he even began to work with cinematography. As digital animation became mainstream, his methods had a significant impact on many animators, especially those who were presenting their work privately on the internet. The reason why he finally worked on cinematography (Note: The term Cinematography is a vestige of the cel animation era. Today, it refers to the process of importing video material produced by each section into a computer and compositing it, rather than filming with a camera. It is also called digital compositing.) is because animators can only leave the rest to the post-process once they have finished drawing with black and white lines, but if they work on cinematography, they can complete the scene by themselves.

All hand-held shooting-style shaky camerawork (Note: He himself says that he does not draw the images as an imitation of hand-held filming, but rather as eye movements that reflect human consciousness.) is determined by Iso. He used to write the scales on paper and hand them over to the cinematographer during the analogue animation era, but after digital animation he controls them himself in After Effects.

=== As a director ===
Iso is a director who can create all the ideas for producing an animation work by himself, including visual aspects such as character, mechanic and prop design. He is involved in almost every step of the director's work, including the original, and controls everything himself. This production style is rare in Japanese animation, especially in TV animation, and is similar to Hayao Miyazaki's Future Boy Conan in terms of consistency from script and storyboard to layout and drawing, and to Makoto Shinkai's personal work Voices of a Distant Star from his indie days in terms of comprehensiveness with the addition of cinematography. Even in music production, he repeatedly discusses with the composers of theme songs and soundtracks until he is satisfied.

Unlike when working as an animator, Iso focuses more on dialogue and story development and does not try to move the animation too much.

Iso makes as many variations of the story as possible when creating original works. The number of drafts reached 30 for Dennō Coil and 100 for The Orbital Children. By writing different patterns of plots and examining them all, he explores storylines he had not thought of and decides whether they are interesting enough for him as an audience.

Iso controls the footage in the final production process, cinematography, to ensure perfection. He controls all final footage through digital compositing work in After Effects, which includes not only the compositing of the video material but also directorial decisions such as adding effects and adjusting key animations.

== Works ==
Title	Year	Format	Role				
Title	Year	Format	Direction	Animation	Script	Setting	Other
Ninja Senshi Tobikage	1985	TV		Key animation (eps 35, 40)			
Mobile Suit Zeta Gundam	1985	TV		inbetweening			
Mobile Suit Gundam ZZ	1986	TV		inbetweening; Key animation			
Machine Robo: Revenge of Cronos	1986	TV		Key animation (eps 18, 38)			
Metal Armor Dragonar	1987	TV		Key animation (eps 29, 32, 36)			
GeGeGe no Kitarō	1987	TV		Key animation (eps 97, 99, (Note: Ballet scene in the beginning.) 102, (Note: Classroom scene after the title.) 104); Inbetween animation (ep 88)			
Mashin Hero Wataru	1987	TV		Key animation (ep 279 (Note: Workers panicking.))			
Transformers: Super-God Masterforce	1988	TV		Key animation (eps 6, 12, (Note: From cancer raging from the bed to computer exploding.) 18, 24)			
Peter and Wendy	1989	TV		Key animation (ep 20 (Note: Uncredited.))			
Ocean Waves (Note: It was later released in theaters.)	1993	TV		Key animation			
Neon Genesis Evangelion	1995	TV		Key animation (eps 1, 19, 21 (video version) (Note: Pre-title sequence.))	Script (ep 13)	Setting assistance (eps 13, 15); Settings for the entire series (Note: Iso set up the names and details of the facilities and so on.)	
Rurouni Kenshin	1996	TV		Key animation (OP1)			
RahXephon	2002	TV	Episode director (ep 15); Storyboards (ep 15)	Key animation (eps 2, 15); In-between animation (ep 15)	Script (ep 15)		Digital work and CGI (eps 2, 3); After effects (eps 4-10, 12, 14-26)
Dennō Coil	2007	TV	Director; Storyboards (OP, ED, eps 1, 12, 17, 19, 26)	Key Animation (eps 1, 4, 12, 26)	Original Story; Script	Character rough design; Settings for the entire series; Art setting (ep 2)	Digital Effects; Cinematography (ep 26)
Mobile Suit Gundam 0080: War in the Pocket	1989	OVA		Key animation (eps 1, 4, 5)		Mechanical design	
Explorer Woman Ray	1989	OVA		Key animation (ep 1)		Mechanical design	
Gosenzo-sama Banbanzai!	1989	OVA		Key animation (eps 4, 6)			
The Hakkenden	1990	OVA		Key animation (ep 1)			
Like the Clouds, Like the Wind	1990	OVA		Key animation			
Teito Monogatari	1991	OVA		Key animation (ep 2)			
Yumemakura Baku Twilight Gekijō	1991	OVA		Key animation			
JoJo's Bizarre Adventure	1993	OVA		Key animation (ep 13 (Note: original 6.))			
Super Dimension Century Orguss	1993	OVA		Key animation (ep 5)			
Final Fantasy: Legend of the Crystals	1994	OVA		Key animation (ep 2 (Note: Under the pseudonym Hideo Nieda.))			Effects animation supervisor
Giant Robo (OVA)	1994	OVA		Key animation (ep 5)			
Mighty Space Miners	1994	OVA		Key animation (ep 2)			
Golden Boy	1995	OVA		Key animation (ep 4)			
Voogie's Angel	1997	OVA		Key animation (ep 3 (Note: Under the pseudonym Mikio Odagawa.))			
Blue Submarine No. 6	1998	OVA		Key animation (ep 1)			
FLCL	2000	OVA		Key animation (ep 6)			
Mobile Suit Gundam: Char's Counterattack	1988	Film		Animation director; Key animation (Note: Credited as both Mitsuo Iso and Mikio Odagawa.)			
Only Yesterday	1991	Film		Key animation (Note: Taeko's childhood, including the dodgeball scene.)			
Roujin Z	1991	Film				Mechanical design (Note: Various designs including hospital equipment.)	
Porco Rosso	1992	Film		Key animation			
Hashire Melos!	1992	Film		Key animation			
Kattobase! Dreamers	1994	Film	Layout assistance	Key animation			
Junkers Come Here	1995	Film		Key animation (Note: Monologue scene in the end.)			
Ghost in the Shell	1995	Film		Key animation		Firearm design	
Magnetic Rose (Memories)	1995	Film		Key animation		Imageboards; Firearm design	
The End of Evangelion	1997	Film		Key animation			Effects (Note: Only his own key animation part.); Cinematography
Perfect Blue	1998	Film		Key animation			
Digimon Adventure	1999	Film		Key animation			
Blood: The Last Vampire	2000	Film		Key animation			Visual effects (Note: Effects and cinematography.)
Cowboy Bebop: The Movie	2001	Film		Key animation (Note: Uncredited (presumed).)			Digital work
RahXephon: Pluralitas Concentio	2003	Film					Digital work
Steamboy	2004	Film					Pre-production conceptual development
Welcome to the Space Show	2010	Film		Key animation			
Giovanni's Island	2014	Film		Key animation			
The Case of Hana & Alice	2015	Film		Cooperation in animation drawing			
Kill Bill	2003	Film		Key animation (Note: Animated scene in the live-action film.)			
Les Pirates de la Réunion	suspended	Film	Director		Original Story; Script		
Napping Princess	2017	Film		Key animation			
The Orbital Children	2022	Film	Director; Storyboards	Key animation	Original Story; Script	Character rough design; Settings for the entire series; Art setting	Digital Effects; Cinematography
Children of Ether	2017	Webcast		Key animation			
Blade Runner Black Out 2022	2017	Webcast		Key animation			Cooperation in cinematography
Popolocrois	1996	Game		Key animation			
Ghost in the Shell	1997	Game	Layout system	Key animation			

== Bibliography ==
- Iso, Mitsuo (September 19, 2017). 磯光雄 ANIMATION WORKS vol.1 [Iso Mitsuo ANIMATION WORKS vol.1] (in Japanese) (1st ed.). Tokyo, Japan: Style. ISBN 978-4-80-213072-1.
- Iso, Mitsuo (February 20, 2018). 磯光雄 ANIMATION WORKS vol.2 [Iso Mitsuo ANIMATION WORKS vol.2] (in Japanese) (1st ed.). Tokyo, Japan: Style. ISBN 978-4-80-213089-9.
- Iso, Mitsuo (August 29, 2023). 磯光雄 ANIMATION WORKS preproduction [Iso Mitsuo ANIMATION WORKS preproduction] (in Japanese) (1st ed.). Tokyo, Japan: Style. ISBN 978-4-80-213353-1.
- Iso, Mitsuo (July 1, 2008). 電脳コイル ビジュアルコレクション [Den-noh Coil Visual Collection] (in Japanese) (1st ed.). Tokyo, Japan: Tokuma Shoten. ISBN 978-4-19-720256-0.
- Iso, Mitsuo (October 31, 2008). 電脳コイル 企画書 [Den-noh Coil Proposal] (in Japanese) (1st ed.). Tokyo, Japan: Tokuma Shoten. ISBN 978-4-19-862613-6.
- Iso, Mitsuo (September 5, 2018). 電脳コイル アーカイブス [Den-noh Coil Archives] (in Japanese) (1st ed.). Tokyo, Japan: Style. ISBN 978-4-90-294824-0.
- Iso, Mitsuo; Yoshida, Kenichi (January 28, 2022). 地球外少年少女 設定資料集 [The Orbital Children Design Works] (in Japanese) (1st ed.). Tokyo, Japan: Style. ISBN 978-4-80-219351-1.
- Iso, Mitsuo; Yoshida, Kenichi (January 28, 2022). 地球外少年少女 ビジュアルアーカイブス [The Orbital Children Visual Archives] (in Japanese) (1st ed.). Tokyo, Japan: Style. ISBN 978-4-80-219350-4.
- Iso, Mitsuo (August 31, 2022). 地球外少年少女プロダクションノート [The Orbital Children Production Notes] (in Japanese) (1st ed.). Tokyo, Japan: Ichijinsha. ISBN 978-4-80-213353-1.

== Awards ==
- The Excellence Award in the Animation Division of the 2007 Japan Media Arts Festival
- The 29th Nihon SF Taisho Award (2008)
- The Best Dramatic Presentation of the 39th Seiun Award (2008)
- The Best TV Animation Award of the 7th Tokyo Anime Award (2008)
- Individual Award at the 13th Animation Kobe (2008)
