= Water Colors (album) =

Studio album by Ayako Ikeda
- Released: October 9, 2002
- Recorded: On Air Azabu and Studio Mia in Tokyo, 73rd St. Studio, Elegant Too Studio, Studio Invisible and The Cutting Room in New York City
- Genre: Pop, contemporary
- Length: 59:42
- Label: Universal Japan
- Producer: Ritsuko Kazami, Shoehei Narabe

Ayako Ikeda chronology
| Water Colors (2002) | Lunar Soup (2005) |

Water Colors is the first album by Japanese song writer Ayako Ikeda. It was released in Japan on October 9, 2002. This album includes her second single "Life" which is featured as the main theme for the Japanese TV drama "Ai nante iranee yo, natsu" (愛なんていらねえよ、夏). Also includes her debut single, "Yasashii Uta" (ヤサシイウタ).

== Track listing ==
All lead vocals were sung by Ayako Ikeda, and arranged by Shohei Narabe.

1. Overture - 0:46
2. Hitotsu no Negai (ひとつの願い) - 6:10
3. Tobenai Tori (飛べない鳥) - 4:16
4. Life - 3:43
5. Yasashii Uta (ヤサシイウタ) - 5:15
6. Eternal Wind - 4:22
7. Umi to Sora no Yume (海と空の夢) - 4:22
8. Tsuki (月) - 4:22
9. All Of... - 5:14
10. Train - 4:28
11. Motto Motto - 5:25
12. Hikari no Hana (光の花) - 4:45
13. Silent Bells - 6:43

== Personnel ==
- Ayako Ikeda - lead and background vocals
- Peter Bliss - guitar, bass, mandolin
- Chris Maxwell - guitar
- David Weiss - irish flute
- Ole Mathisen - soprano saxophone
- Ty Stephens - background vocals
