= Den-noh Coil =

Japanese anime television series

- Cover of the first DVD volume, featuring Yuko Okonogi (left) and Fumie Hashimoto (right)

電脳コイル (Dennō Koiru)
- Genre: Science fiction
- Created by: Mitsuo Iso
- Anime television series
- Directed by: Mitsuo Iso; Assistants: Masaru Yasukawa; Tomoya Takahashi
- Produced by: Sanae Mitsuki; Shigeru Watanabe; Hisako Matsumoto
- Written by: Mitsuo Iso
- Music by: Tsuneyoshi Saito
- Studio: Madhouse
- Licensed by: AUS: Siren Visual; NA: Maiden Japan
- Original network: NHK-E
- Original run: May 12, 2007 – December 1, 2007
- Episodes: 26
- Light novel
- Written by: Yūko Miyamura
- Published by: Tokuma Shoten
- Imprint: Tokuma Novels Edge
- Original run: April 4, 2007 – November 20, 2010
- Volumes: 13
- Manga

Den-noh Coil The Comics
- Written by: Mitsuo Iso
- Illustrated by: Kuze Mizuki
- Published by: Shogakukan
- Magazine: Ciao
- Original run: July 3, 2007 – October 31, 2007
- Volumes: 1
- icon

Den-noh Coil (Japanese: 電脳コイル, Hepburn: Dennō Koiru; lit. Cyber Coil), also known as Coil – A Circle of Children; is a Japanese science fiction anime television series produced by Madhouse. The series is created, directed and written by Mitsuo Iso, it aired for 26 episodes in Japan on NHK Educational TV between May and December 2007. The story follows a group of children as they use AR glasses to unravel the mysteries of the half real, half Internet city, using a variety of illegal software tools, techniques, and virtual pets to manipulate the digital landscape.

It is a pioneering work that depicts daily life in a world dominated by AR (augmented reality) technology, in which layers created by computer networks are superimposed on the real world. It has received high praise among critics for its fusion of old-fashioned Japanese scenery and urban legends, a modern version of the Japanese folklore Kaidan, with a futuristic worldview, and for its story of children playing in an augmented reality world using a device called "Den-noh Megane" (cyber glasses), as if anticipating the subsequent emergence of smart glasses.

Den-noh Coil has won several awards, including the Grand Prize of the 29th Nihon SF Taisho Award, the Best Media of the 39th Seiun Award, both in 2008, and the Excellence Award at the 11th Japan Media Arts Festival in 2007.

== Plot ==
The year is 2026, and it has been 11 years since the "Den-noh Megane" (cyber glasses), a wearable computer in the form of glasses that uses AR technology, became widespread throughout the world. The glasses allow information from the Den-noh world to be superimposed on and manipulated in the real world. There are pets and tools that use Den-noh technology, and the telephone and Internet are used through Den-noh Megane. Children could no longer remember the time when they could see the world without looking through glasses.

Just before her last summer vacation in elementary school, Yuko Okonogi, a.k.a. Yasako, moves from Kanazawa City, the capital of the prefecture, to Daikoku City, a provincial city with an ancient capital lined with historic shrines and temples, but also equipped with the latest electronic infrastructure. There she meets another Yuko, Yuko Amasawa, also known as Isako, who has the same name and is the same age but is in contrast to her. At her new school, Yasako meets a group of children with rich personalities and experiences a series of strange events that occur in the Den-noh space. Yasako's new classmates, Fumie, Daichi, and Haraken, belong to the Children's Detective Bureau run by her grandmother, and as she investigates urban legends about dangerous beings in Den-noh space with them, she learns that one of their friends may have died because of her pursuit of that being. Most frightening of all, Yasako has lost all memory of her previous time in Daikoku City.

== Characters ==
Yuko Okonogi (小此木 優子, Okonogi Yūko)
Voiced by: Fumiko Orikasa (Japanese); Hilary Haag (English)
Nicknamed Yasako, which is another reading of 優子 meaning "gentle girl". With her sister Kyoko and her two parents, Yasako moves to the city of Daikoku to live with her grandmother, Megabā. Yasako is a sweet and passive girl who follows the lead of Fumie, who eventually initiates her into Megabā's Coil Cyber Detective Agency as its eighth member. Yasako has been to the city of Daikoku seven years ago for her grandfather's funeral. A pair of Den-noheyeglasses and the virtual pet Densuke were left to her as a memento. During her time in Daikoku, she coincidentally wandered into the Coil Domain where she befriended a young boy with the codename 4423. After Yasako returns to live in Daikoku, her hazy memories of that enigmatic friendship gradually return to haunt her. Her father Ichirō works at a Dennou technology company, Megamass, which deploys Searchmaton in Daikoku. Her birthdate is October 12, 2015.
Yuko Amasawa (天沢 勇子, Amasawa Yūko)
Voiced by: Houko Kuwashima (Japanese); Monica Rial (English)

From left to right: Daichi, Yasako, Fumie, and Isako.

Nicknamed Isako, which is another reading of 勇子 meaning "brave girl", Yuko Amasawa is a powerful type of hacker known as an "encoder" (暗号屋, angōya) who is able to manipulate the electronic infrastructure through sophisticated chalk patterns. Rumored to have familial ties to an AR technology company, Isako uses a Brain-Computer Interface to interact with the virtual world—a function hidden inside the hardware of AR visors and eyeglasses. Isako is, on the surface, extremely arrogant and antisocial, perceiving human relationships strictly as hierarchies of power and manipulation. Isako relentlessly chases special illegals in order to collect kirabugs. She is secretly driven to this task in the hopes of finding her brother in "the other side". Her birthdate is April 4, 2015.
Kyoko Okonogi (小此木 京子, Okonogi Kyōko)
Voiced by: Akiko Yajima (Japanese); Kira Vincent-Davis (English)
She is the little sister of Yasako. She is young and childish and often gets in the way of danger. She shows a number of fixations; the most common one is the repeated use of the word "poop" when pointing at people and other items of interest (Daichi can even decode her "poop poop" language).
Fumie Hashimoto (橋本 文恵, Hashimoto Fumie)
Voiced by: Sachiko Kojima (Japanese); Brittney Karbowski (English)
Fumie is the seventh member of the Coil Den-noh Detective Agency. She befriends Yasako almost immediately, and has a quick-witted, playful nature. She is an experienced hacker and an adept user of metatags, and makes use of her digital pet, Oyaji, in her investigations.
Akira Hashimoto (橋本 アキラ, Hashimoto Akira)
Voiced by: Yumiko Kobayashi (Japanese); Kira Vincent-Davis (English)
Akira is the youngest member of the Daikoku Hackers' Club. He agrees to spy on the Daikoku Hackers for his older sister, Fumie, by joining their ranks as a double agent. Akira makes use of his digital pet "Micet", which he illegally patched to unlock its video recording feature.
Kenichi Harakawa (原川 研一, Harakawa Kenichi)
Voiced by: Romi Park (Japanese); Luci Christian (English)

Haraken and his aunt, Tamako.

Nicknamed Haraken. He is the president of the Biology Club, and is the Coil Den-noh Detective Agency's fifth member. The polar opposite of Fumie, he is shy, reserved, and secretive, especially of his personal connection to Searchmaton. Haraken is personally vested in researching internet viruses and illegals on behalf of Kanna Ashihara, his childhood friend, who died by traffic accident under mysterious circumstances in the previous year. He is secretly tormented by the idea, that a part of Kanna may still exist somewhere on "the other side". He begins to have feelings for Yasako but is distracted by Kanna's Incident.
Tamako Harakawa (原川 玉子, Harakawa Tamako)
Voiced by: Junko Noda (Japanese); Tiffany Terrell (English)
Tamako is Haraken's aunt. As a consultant for Daikoku's Den-noh space Administration, she holds authority over the programming of Searchmaton and is responsible for its highly aggressive behavior. She is especially intent on preventing Yuko Amasawa from accomplishing her mission to summon a portal to Coil Domain. However Tamako herself is well-versed in hacking and the crafting of metatags, and she often oversteps her authority in investigating the protagonists' activities. Her fervent pursuit of making augmented reality a "safe place" stems from her re-opening the portal to the other side in her early days of hacking, thus initiating the constant battle between obsolete and new space.
Daichi Sawaguchi (沢口 ダイチ, Sawaguchi Daichi)
Voiced by: Rie Saito (Japanese); Tiffany Grant (English)
Daichi is the founder and leader of a group of pranksters at school called the Daikoku Hackers' Club. Hot-headed and quick to take offense, he holds an ongoing love/hate rivalry with Fumie stemming from early childhood. With the appearance of Isako, Daichi quickly finds himself defeated and cast out of his own group after challenging her. While often perceived as a troublemaker, Daichi is tagged by his awkward friend, Denpa, who holds him in high regard for befriending him in the face of school harassment. Daichi is, somewhat ironically, a constant target of Kyoko's antics. He has a crush on Fumie but she is oblivious to her feelings even though she actually cares for him.
Sanae Okonogi (小此木 早苗, Okonogi Sanae)
Voiced by: Reiko Suzuki (Japanese); Laura Chapman (English)
Sanae, also known as Megabā (Specs Granny in the English dub), whose nickname stems from the Japanese words for eyeglasses (メガネ, megane) and grandma (ばあちゃん, bāchan), is the owner of the Den-noh Candy Shop Megasi-ya. She sells software and Meta-Tags, and sometimes buys Meta-Bugs. Megabā is the primary craftsman of meta tags in Daikoku, and is an expert software programmer. She is also Yasako's grandmother, and the head of the Coil Den-noh Detective Agency. Her cunning frugality terrifies Yasako among other characters. Her deceased husband was a researcher in the early medical application of Den-noh technology. His secret legacy is slowly unveiled throughout the series.
Sosuke Nekome (猫目 宗助, Nekome Sōsuke)
Voiced by: Koji Yusa (Japanese); Chris Patton (English)
The antagonist of the series. He is an old acquaintance of Tamako Harakawa, a colleague of Megamass, and a collaborator in Isako's quest to open the door to the "other side". His ultimate goal is to bring down Megamass, the company that stole their father's achievements and led the Nekome family to ruin. He is willing to use any means necessary to do so, even putting human lives at risk.
Takeru Nekome (猫目 タケル, Nekome Takeru)
Voiced by: Aiko Hibi (Japanese); Kalin Coates (English)
The younger brother of Nekome. He runs an online board about urban legends in Daikoku city under the direction of his brother. He takes a liking to Yasako and becomes split between his loyalty towards his brother and his desire to protect her. He gradually begins to question the conspiracy his brother is hatching. He has a modified pink micet named Momoko (モモコ).
Kanna Ashihara (葦原 かんな, Ashihara Kanna)
Voiced by: Mai Aizawa (Japanese); Sasha Paysinger (English)
Kanna is a childhood friend of Haraken. She was researching illegals with Haraken during the summer vacation a year ago, but after arguing and breaking up with him, she was run over by a self-driving car with a Den-noh navigation system and died.
Michiko (ミチコさん, Michiko-san; lit. Miss Michiko)
She is a ghost of the Den-noh world that is especially feared by children among the many urban legends. There are various rumors depending on the region, such as "If you call her up and make a contract, she will grant you anything you wish," or "Children who call her up will be taken to 'the other side'."

=== Den-noh pets ===
Densuke (デンスケ)
Voiced by: Tomohisa Aso (Japanese); ? (English)
A dog-shaped petmaton owned by Yasako. He was a gift from Yasako's grandfather, who was involved in Den-noh medicine.

=== Anti-illegal Den-noh object software ===
Searchmaton (サーチマトン, Sāchimaton)
Searchmaton, Searchy (サッチー, Satchī) for short, is a bot and antivirus software deployed by the Den-noh space Administration of Daikoku, whose task is to debug and maintain the virtual side of the city. Its secondary function is to seek out and disable illegal AR devices, software, and viruses, making it a menace to the characters of the series. Searchmaton, which strikes fear into the hearts of children, ironically, calls out them the cute catch phrase "Me Searchy!" (僕サッチー, boku Satchī) given by Yasako's father, who was involved in its development, with a smiley face also drawn by him. While Searchmaton can patrol the city streets freely, it is prohibited to enter private property such as houses, and other spaces such as temple grounds and schools, because they lie outside of the responsibility of the postal bureau, which has jurisdiction over Search. (Note: Searchy is not allowed into the precincts of the shrine beyond the Torii, the traditional Japanese gate, as if it were a sacred place and therefore not allowed, but in fact it is because it is under the jurisdiction of the Cultural Affairs Bureau.) Searchmaton can deploy up to four spherical drones, Q-chan (キュウちゃん, Kyū-chan; lit. Ball-chan), to aid in its task.
Searchmaton 2.0
A cube-shaped Searchmaton with upgraded armament and shields, capable of running higher-level formats than Searchy. It has a base unit and six extensions like Searchy, but usually only the extensions act like Q-chan. In emergencies, the six units can combine with each other or with the base unit. It is under the jurisdiction of Megamass and the Den-noh Bureau, and is sent out only at the discretion of Megamass or at the request of the government. It can enter shrines and schools beyond the boundaries of the vertical administration, and it can even invade private property with special permission.

== Themes ==
Den-noh Coil is an anime about children growing up in the near future, when semi-immersive augmented reality (AR) technology has just begun to enter the mainstream. It deals with various advanced and new technologies of the future that were not well known at the time of its broadcast, such as wearable computers, self-driving car technology, and virtual currency. The series takes place in the fictional city of Daikoku, a hotbed of AR development with an emerging citywide virtual infrastructure. It follows a group of children as they use AR glasses to unravel the mysteries of the half real, half Internet city, using a variety of illegal software tools, techniques, and virtual pets to manipulate the digital landscape. The title of the show itself, Den-noh Coil, refers to a dangerous separation of one's digital self from the physical body. Dennō means "computer" and is analogous to the archaic English term "cyberbrain". In the series, the word is used to differentiate between virtual and real, e.g. "cyber cat". Due to the animators involved in its production and its unusually high-profile television broadcast time slot, Den-noh Coil was highly anticipated.

The theme of Den-noh Coil using AR technology in mysterious stories and urban legends such as Illegal, Michiko, and "the other side", and above all, "people's feelings and memories" associated with "places". "The other world" visualized by Den-noh glasses is a form of "the past" that has not been updated to the present, a metaphor for the "memories" and "remembrances" that people leave behind in places and sometimes, people are unable to break free from the past and are attracted to "the other world" (Isako, who cannot accept her brother's death, and Haraken, who runs after the shadow of Kanna died in an accident). In other words, the world shown by Den-noh glasses is the thoughts of such people, and through the technology of AR, Den-noh Coil reinterprets folklore and asks how people should confront their past. According to the series director, Mitsuo Iso, a major theme in Den-noh Coil is the distance between the characters, such as Yūko's inability to feel the fur of her own virtual pet, in addition to all the relational tensions and divides of understanding between the characters in the series. In Iso's translated words, it conveys how "there will always be a distance between people, and even between things that seem within ones' reach and that one must walk down a long, thin and winding road before they reach one's heart. There are tons of obstacles. It's in fact like the roads in towns of old."

== Setting ==
Den-noh Coil (電脳コイル, Dennō Koiru; lit. Cyber Coil)
This is a phenomenon of unknown cause in which the Den-noh body separates from the real body when certain conditions are met. When the Den-noh body separates, the real body loses consciousness and appears as a pitch-black shadow through the glasses, with the words "NO DATA" displayed on the surface.
Den-noh Glasses (電脳メガネ, Dennō Megane; lit. Cyber Eyeglasses)

Yasako uses her augmented reality eyeglasses and ear monitors.

A glasses-type wearable computer that is all the rage among children. They called simply Megane (eyeglasses). The visor is always connected to the Internet, which allows them to see the Den-noh materials. So they can see virtual views overlaid on real cityscapes, use Den-noh items, and play with Den-noh pets. They can also make phone calls by using gestures, or use their glasses as a PC by projecting holographic images of monitors and keyboards into the air to control them. They can also listen to sound through futuristic ear monitors embedded in the vines of their glasses.
Den-noh space
It is often referred to simply as "space," in which the Den-noh materials exist. The world in the work is a ubiquitous society that uses it. It is also used for fully automatic control of transportation, and is greatly involved in the daily lives of people who do not use glasses. It is provided by Megamass, and in Daikoku City, it is managed by Daikoku City Hall as an administrative service under the jurisdiction of the Postal Bureau. For this reason, Megamass employees are seconded to the city hall.
Den-noh Navi
A navigation system for self-driving cars using Den-noh glasses.
Den-noh materials
A general term for anything that can be seen by wearing Den-noh glasses, including holograms for PC operation, Den-noh pets, and Den-noh items. People can see the images and hear the sounds they make, but do not feel any physical touch.
Den-noh pets
A legitimate petmaton. Den-noh life forms exist only in Den-noh space, but by wearing Den-noh glasses, they can be seen just like normal animals. Yasako's Denuske, Fumie's Oyaji, and Isako's Mojo fall into this category.
Anti-illegal Den-noh object software

A PSA web graphic, "Searchmaton is our friend".

In Daikoku City, powerful but inflexible software called Searchmaton constantly monitors for damaged or outdated spaces, computer viruses, and illegal Den-noh items, and repairs, formats, and deletes them. The children of Daikoku City are battling daily with Searchmatons, who mercilessly delete even harmless mischievous items and legal Den-noh pets that have wandered into old spaces due to their biased priorities.
Illegals

Densuke explores an abandoned space.

A mysterious black Den-noh creature rumored in urban legends. Its true identity is a new kind of computer virus that infects petmatons, a black illegal Den-noh-thing that has grown to a huge size. It can only live in old space or inside the body of a Den-noh creature. Isako hunts special forms of illegals in the hope of collecting valuable Meta-Bugs.
Nulls
A mysterious humanoid Den-noh creature that is said to be the oldest Illegal. They exist in countless numbers on "the other side" and come to the real world through the "passage". Den-noh coil phenomenon occurs in those whom Null touches, and Den-noh bodies separated from their physical bodies are taken away to "the other side" by Null. Tamako suspects that they are ruined null-carriers that were left to feral after the bankruptcy of Coils.
Coils Node
An experimental Den-noh lifeform with the ability to connect to the C-domain created by Coils.
Den-noh Items
Useful items that can be used within the Den-noh space. The children of Daikoku City purchase them at the Megashiya or mail-order Den-noh candy shops. Den-noh items include the Megane beam, which can destroy a small amount of Den-noh material, black bug spray, which artificially generates bugs, defensive walls such as brick walls and iron walls, and missiles called Tyokushin-kun (Mr. Straight) and Tsuiseki-kun (Mr. Chase).
Meta-Bugs
A mysterious Den-noh Materials that looks like a gemstone. It tends to occur in spatial distortions, and is thought to be the result of spatial bugs that have solidified.Since it can only be mined in Daikoku City, it is unofficially considered a specialty of the city. Most of them are useless bugs, but very rarely they have useful features that contain information such as sounds and images, and from their unique properties they can be refined into items or Meta-Tags by skilled craftsmen. Because of this, they sometimes fetch high prices and are used as virtual currency for trading Den-noh items only among children. The unit of currency in illegal stores on the Internet is "meta," and 1 meta = 1 yen. However, as Searchmatons delete damaged or corrupted spaces from one side to the other, the scarcity value is gradually increasing.
Kira-Bugs
A kind of special Meta-Bugs that is said to be sold at a high price, some say 30 times the price of a normal one. It is one of the urban legends, and few people have actually seen it.
Meta-Tags
A kind of Den-noh item made from Meta-Bugs, it is a Den-noh talisman with various programs that affect Den-noh space and Den-noh pets. It can only be made by Megabā, so it is sold only at Megashi-ya, and is the basic tool of the Coil Den-noh Detective Agency. On its surface, it has a pattern similar to the Code Formula. In fact, the Code Formula has its roots in it, and Isako calls it the "old school".
Coil-Tags
A Meta-Tag used to return the Den-noh body back into the real body when the Den-noh coil phenomenon occurs.
Imago
A hidden feature of the Den-noh glasses, rumored in urban legends, that allows users to manipulate Den-noh space without using Den-noh items or gestures, just by thinking about it.
Code Formula (暗号式, Angō-shiki)
It is one of the programs that manipulate Den-noh space, and is activated by drawing geometric patterns on the ground or walls with Den-noh chalk. According to urban legend, those who use it are called "wizards of Den-noh space," and are rumored to be hackers who also do illegal things.
Code Reactor (暗号炉, Angō-ro)
A structure that is directly connected to imago and can read Code Formula directly from thoughts. By embedding it in a Den-noh body, the Code Formula's features can be used freely and continuously, but it also has dangerous side effects such as damaging the human body and nerves.
"Old Space" (「古い空間」, "Furui Kūkan")
An unstable old version of the Den-noh space, first created and still left in the city. However, it is gradually expanding for some reason in Daikoku City. This is where Den-noh fog, the Illegals, and Meta-Bugs come from.
"The Other Side" (「あっち」, "Acchi")
It is a place rumored in children's urban legends that Kira-Bug and Michiko come from. According to the legend, some children have gone to "the other side" in their dreams by sleeping with their Den-noh glasses on. The true identity is a medical Den-noh space created by Coils, the developer of the Den-noh glasses, using Imago, and abandoned by Megamass, which took over the business after Coils' bankruptcy, in order to cover up something. Unlike the Den-noh space, it is an isolated virtual space that is not linked to the real world, so in order to enter it, one must separate their consciousness from their body and become a Den-noh body. This is when the Den-noh coil phenomenon occurs.
C Domain
The official name is Coil Domain, which was used by Coils that developed the first Den-noh glasses.
Daikoku City
A regional city famous for eyeglasses on the Sea of Japan side, not far from Kanazawa City in Ishikawa Prefecture. It is one of the oldest cities in Japan with many historic shrines and temples, and at the same time it is the second largest Den-noh city in Japan in terms of infrastructure related to Den-noh glasses. It is the second semi-governmental special administrative district in Japan, and some people said that its administration is carried out by an affiliate of Megamass. The city hall's space management office manages the Den-noh space in the city, where Yasako's father and Tamako, who are seconded from Megamas, work.
Urban Legends
Among the children of Daikoku City, various strange incidents related to Den-noh have been passed down as urban legends.
Megashi-ya
Den-noh Megane's Dagashi-ya (candy shop) run by Megabā, abbreviated as "Megashi-ya". What she sells to children instead of cheap snacks are powerful Den-noh items that violate the rules of the Daikoku City Space Management Office and are subject to extermination by Searchmaton. She also buys Meta-Bugs, which are used as virtual currency "meta" for purchases in her store.
Coil Den-noh Detective Agency
A detective agency led by Megabā that solves Den-noh-related problems on request. Their main job is to search for missing Den-noh pets.
Daikoku Heikū Club (大黒黒客倶楽部, Daikoku Heikū Kurabu)
A "cool" club formed by Daichi with the boys from his elementary school's biology club. "Heikū" means hacker in Chinese. The club was later taken over by Isako. Daichi launched a new club, Original Heikū (元祖黒客, Ganso Heikū), with Denpa.
Megamass
Megamass is a Japanese global technology company that specializes in Den-noh related businesses, selling products such as Den-noh glasses and Den-noh pets, and providing services to maintain and manage Den-noh spaces and Den-noh navi that manage self-driving cars.
Coils
The official name is Coil Coils, a company that first developed the Den-noh glasses and did some challenging research, but went bankrupt about five years ago. Its technology and research results were taken over by Megamass.

== Media ==
=== Anime ===
Originally, the Den-noh Coil project was to be an animated film directed by Mitsuo Iso. In January 2007, Madhouse announced that the project was an animated series based on the light novel of the same name. The series was a project Iso had been working on for over a decade and his directorial debut. It aired 26 episodes from May 12 to December 1, 2007, on NHK Educational TV.

Australian distributor Siren Visual released the series on streaming in July with English subtitles, and on DVD in September in 2011. Maiden Japan released the series on Blu-ray and DVD with English dubbing in North America in June 2016. It was released on Netflix in late January 2022 to promote The Orbital Children, a 2-part film directed by Mitsuo Iso.

==== Theme songs ====
Opening theme
"Prism" (プリズム, Purizumu)
Composed and performed by Ayako Ikeda; arranged by Tatoo.
Ending theme
"Pieces of The Sky" (空の欠片, Sora no Kakera)
Composed and performed by Ayako Ikeda; arranged by Tatoo.

=== Light novels ===
A thirteen light novel adaptation of Den-noh Coil, written by Yūko Miyamura, was published by Tokuma Shoten. The first volume was released on April 4, 2007, and the last volume was released on November 20, 2010.

=== Manga ===
A spin-off manga illustrated by Kuze Mizuki, titled Den-noh Coil The Comics, was first published with a single chapter in Shogakukan's shōjo manga magazine Ciao on July 3, 2007, and later continued and completed in a tankōbon volume released on October 31 of the same year.

=== Other media ===
The PC browser game Den-noh Coil: Hōkago Tantei Kyoku (電脳コイル 放課後探偵局, lit. Den-noh Coil: After School Detective Agency), developed by GameOn was available from January 25, 2012, to July 12, 2013.

A production art book titled Den-noh Coil Archives book was released in Japan in 2018, It included anime production materials such as early character designs, background art for each episode, image boards, and other materials from the series.

== Reception ==
THEM Anime Reviews gave it a 5 out of 5 stars calling it "The animation is consistently excellent throughout, and the music is great. The characters are also well constructed and worth caring for. The world of Den-noh Coil is convincing and realistic. The story has a very complex puzzle at its heart, and waiting for all the pieces to come together is rewarding. Intelligent and superbly animated, Den-noh Coil will satisfy the appetites of fans who want something more from their anime". Anime News Network praised the series for its unique concepts, story, animation and technology, describing it as "Concepts that are years ahead of their time, engaging characters and story, good use of CG with strong character development, engaging mysteries, tense and thrilling action sequences".

Jonathan Clements writing for The Encyclopedia of Science Fiction praised Dennō Coil for its imaginative depiction of augmented reality, describing the series as a striking visual analogy for the growing influence of the Internet on everyday life. He highlighted the show's portrayal of a near-future city in which virtual information is superimposed on physical surroundings, drawing attention to the often invisible economics of digital environments and the hidden communities connected through online communication. The encyclopedia also noted the series' unusually long development period and suggested that its initially limited international recognition was partly attributable to a downturn in the anime industry around the time of its release.

Newspaper Mainichi Shimbun suggested the technology shown in the series would have a great influence on the future, comparing it to the way Snow Crash influenced the development of Second Life. It also praised the series for showing technology that was very Japanese, and concentrating on how the youth grow. Mike Toole of Anime News Network named Den-noh Coil among his top 10 overlooked anime of the 2000s, calling it "sort of a spiritual successor to last decade's Serial Experiments Lain" and "one of those shows where the end of each episode triggers immediate desire for the next episode." John Hanke, former head of Google's Geo Product division, founder of software company Niantic, Inc. and creator of Ingress & Pokémon Go, is a fan of Den-noh Coil and Ghost in the Shell.

In 2008, the Virtual World Institute of GLOCOM; (Note: Center for Global Communications, International University of Japan, a think-tank of International University of Japan.) found new possibilities in the augmented reality depicted in Den-noh Coil, which overlays a network on the real world rather than in virtual reality. They then discussed the feasibility of infrastructure to support society and the form of organization to run society as an exploration of the future society. At the time, with the Second Life boom that occurred around 2006, there was a lot of talk about a virtual society, but in Europe and the U.S., the idea of creating a completely different world where people could do whatever they wanted, like the metaverse in the science fiction novel Snow Crash. In contrast, they saw in this work the possibility of not only that, but also the possibility of a virtual world embedded in the real world. They also suggested that while the virtual worlds and community services offered by the online gaming industry are Snow Crash-like, future services could appeal to a wider audience by adopting the Den-noh Coil concept.

=== Accolades ===
Year	Award	Category	Nominee	Result	Ref.
2007	7th Japanese Otaku Awards	Grand Prize	Den-noh Coil	Nominated	
2007	11th Japan Media Arts Festival	Excellence Award	Den-noh Coil	Won	
2008	29th Nihon SF Taisho Award	Grand Prize	Den-noh Coil	Won	
2008	39th Seiun Award	Best Media	Den-noh Coil	Won	
2008	7th Tokyo Anime Award	Best TV Animation	Den-noh Coil	Won	
2008	13th Animation Kobe	Individual Award	Mitsuo Iso	Won	

== See also ==
- "The Children's Night", Mitsuo Iso's episode director debut
- Microsoft HoloLens
- Apple Vision Pro
  - visionOS
- Android XR
- Spatial computing
