= Castle in the Sky =

1986 Japanese animated film by Hayao Miyazaki

- Theatrical release poster

Japanese name
- Japanese: 天空の城ラピュタ
Transcriptions
- Revised Hepburn: Tenkū no Shiro Rapyuta
- Directed by: Hayao Miyazaki
- Written by: Hayao Miyazaki
- Produced by: Isao Takahata
- Starring: Mayumi Tanaka; Keiko Yokozawa; Kotoe Hatsui; Minori Terada
- Cinematography: Hirokata Takahashi
- Edited by: Takeshi Seyama; Yoshihiro Kasahara
- Music by: Joe Hisaishi
- Production company: Studio Ghibli
- Distributed by: Toei Company
- Release date: August 2, 1986
- Running time: 124 minutes
- Country: Japan
- Language: Japanese

Castle in the Sky, also known as Laputa: Castle in the Sky, (Note: Japanese: 天空の城ラピュタ, Hepburn: Tenkū no Shiro Rapyuta) is a 1986 Japanese animated fantasy adventure film written and directed by Hayao Miyazaki. It was produced by Isao Takahata, animated by Studio Ghibli, and distributed by the Toei Company. The film stars the voices of Mayumi Tanaka, Keiko Yokozawa, Kotoe Hatsui, and Minori Terada. In the film, orphans Sheeta and Pazu are pursued by government agent Muska, the army, and a group of pirates. They seek Sheeta's crystal necklace, the key to accessing Laputa, a legendary flying castle hosting advanced technology.

Castle in the Sky was the first film to be animated by Studio Ghibli. Its production team included many of Miyazaki's longtime collaborators, who would continue to work with the studio for the following three decades. The film was partly inspired by Miyazaki's trips to Wales, where he witnessed the aftermath of the 1984–1985 coal miners' strike. The island of Laputa is used to highlight the theme of environmentalism, exploring the relationships between humanity, nature, and technology, a reflection of Miyazaki's ecological philosophy. The young protagonists also provide a unique perspective on the narrative, as a result of Miyazaki's desire to portray "the honesty and goodness of children in [his] work". Many aspects of the film's retrofuturistic style – the flying machines in particular – are influenced by nineteenth-century approaches, which has earned the film a reputation in the modern steampunk genre.

The film was released in Japanese theaters on August 2, 1986. It underperformed at the box office, but later achieved commercial success through rereleases. An English dub commissioned by Tokuma Shoten was distributed in North America by Streamline Pictures, and another dub was produced by Disney in 1998, released internationally by Buena Vista in 2003. The film's score was composed by Joe Hisaishi, who would become a close collaborator of Miyazaki's; Hisaishi also composed a reworked soundtrack for the 2003 English dub. The film was generally acclaimed by critics, though the English dubs received mixed reviews. It was well received by audiences, being voted as one of the greatest animated films in polls conducted by the Agency for Cultural Affairs and Oricon. The film also received several notable accolades, including the Ōfuji Noburō Award at the Mainichi Film Awards and the Anime Grand Prix from Animage. Castle in the Sky has since attained cult status, and has influenced several notable artists working in multiple media.

== Plot summary ==
An airship carrying Sheeta – an orphan girl abducted by the government agent Muska – is attacked by Dola and her air pirate gang, who seek Sheeta's crystal necklace. Attempting to escape, Sheeta falls from the airship but is saved by the crystal's magic, which gently lowers her to the ground. Pazu, an orphan working as a mechanic in a 19th-century mining town, catches her and takes her home to recover. The following morning, he shows Sheeta a photograph his father took of Laputa, a mythical castle on a flying island that Pazu hopes to find. Soon afterward, Dola's gang and Muska's soldiers arrive searching for Sheeta. Fleeing through the town, Pazu and Sheeta fall into a mine shaft, where the crystal again saves them. In the tunnels, they meet Uncle Pom, who reveals deposits of the glowing mineral Aetherium, the same material as Sheeta's crystal.

Sheeta reveals to Pazu her secret name that ties her to Laputa, confirming that the legend is true. The army captures the pair and imprisons them in Titus Fort, where Muska shows Sheeta a deactivated robot bearing the same insignia as her crystal and reveals she is heir to the Laputan throne. He releases Pazu in exchange for Sheeta's cooperation in locating Laputa. Returning home, Pazu is captured by Dola's gang, who intend to steal the crystal from Titus Fort. He joins them in an attempt to rescue Sheeta. At the fort, Sheeta recites an ancient phrase taught by her grandmother, inadvertently activating the crystal's power and reanimating the robot. The robot protects her from the soldiers and devastates the fort before being destroyed by the military airship Goliath. Amid the chaos, Pazu and Dola rescue Sheeta, but Muska retains the crystal, whose magic guides him toward Laputa.

Using clues she observed from the crystal, Sheeta helps Pazu persuade Dola to take them to Laputa in exchange for temporarily joining her crew. During the journey, Goliath attacks Dola's airship. Dola detaches the crow's nest – containing Sheeta and Pazu – which functions as a glider tethered to the ship, while Pazu identifies a massive storm where he believes Laputa is hidden. Violent winds destroy the airship and sever the glider's tether, sending Pazu and Sheeta through the storm.

They arrive safely on Laputa, finding it largely deserted except for wildlife and a peaceful robot caretaker. The castle lies in ruins beneath a giant tree growing from the island's center. The army soon arrives and begins looting the castle after capturing Dola's gang. Muska betrays the soldiers, destroys their communications equipment, and takes Sheeta into the castle's core, which houses Laputa's ancient knowledge and weaponry. Using the crystal, he activates the city's defenses and reveals that he, too, is descended from the Laputan royal line. After demonstrating Laputa's power by causing a massive explosion over the ocean and destroying Goliath, Muska declares his intention to use the city to dominate the world.

Horrified, Sheeta steals back the crystal and flees, but Muska corners her in Laputa's throne room. Pazu arrives and negotiates a brief truce, allowing Sheeta to teach him the spell of destruction. Together, they recite it, causing Muska to fall to his death as Laputa collapses around them. The giant tree shields Sheeta and Pazu from the destruction and preserves part of the castle, along with Dola's glider, as the island rises into space. Sheeta, Pazu, and Dola's gang escape safely and briefly reunite before parting ways.

== Voice cast ==
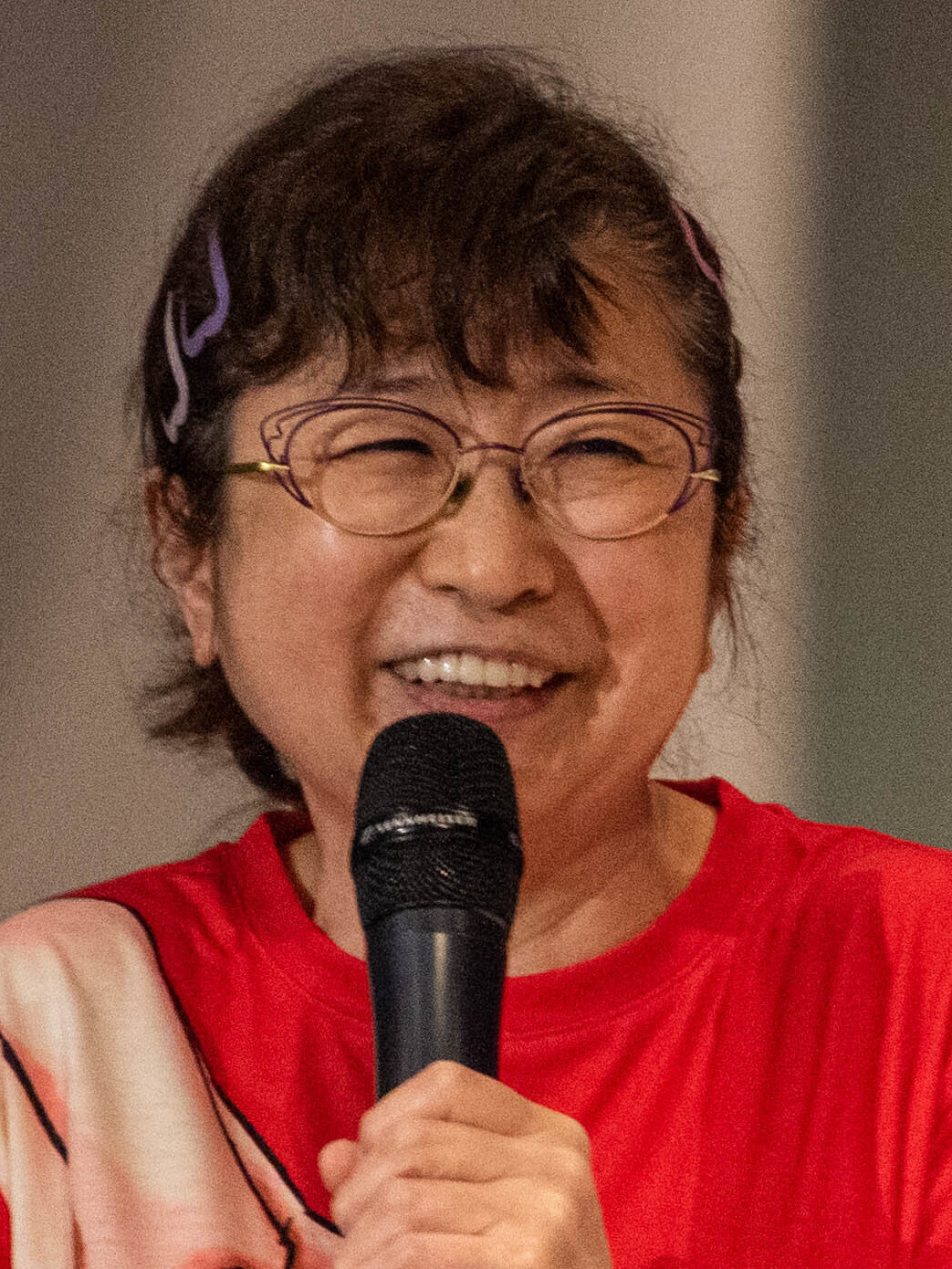
Mayumi Tanaka (pictured in 2023), who voiced Pazu in the original Japanese

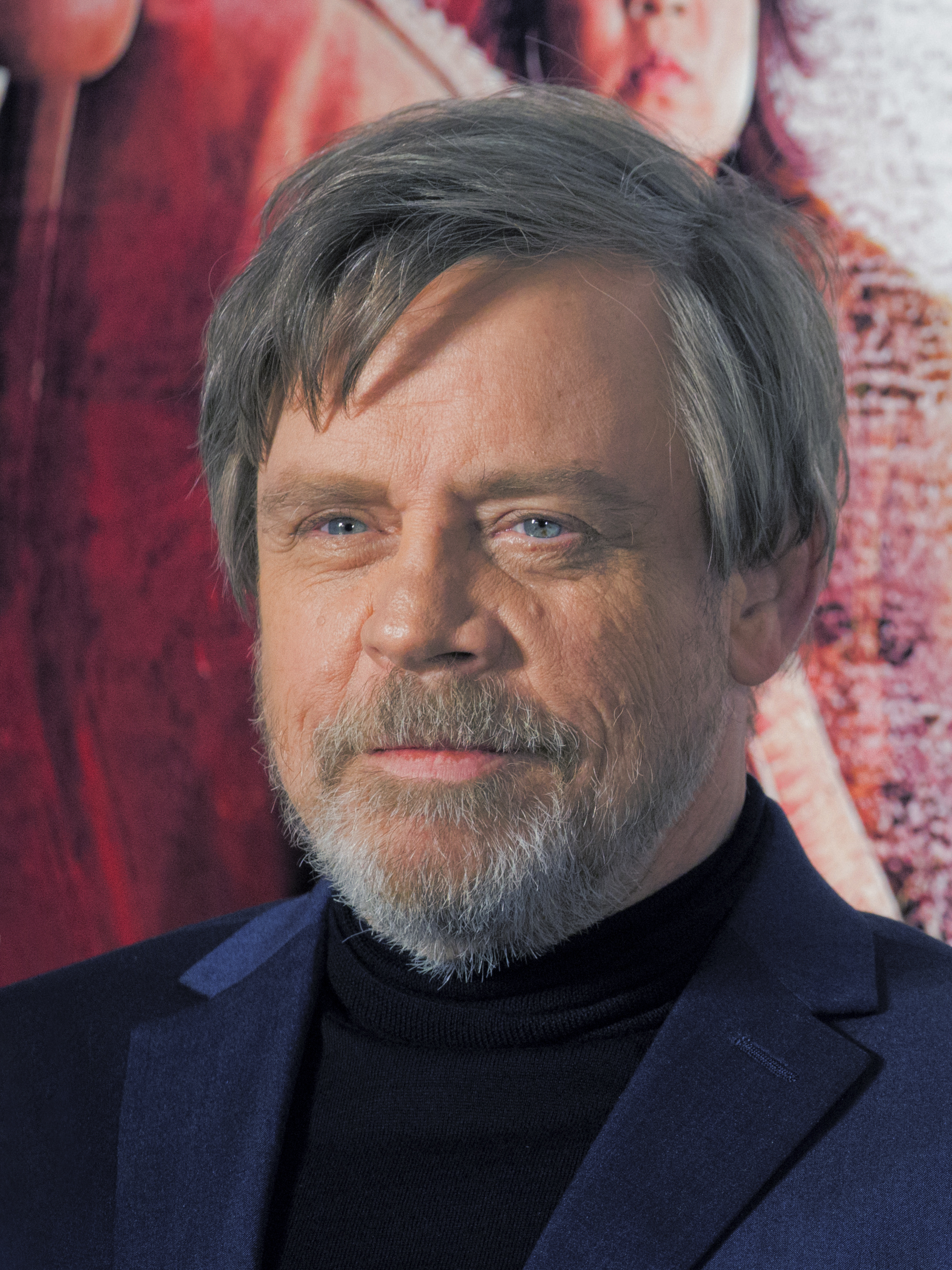
Mark Hamill (2017), who played Muska in the 2003 English dub

Character name		Voice actor		
English	Japanese	Japanese (1986)	English	
English	Japanese	Japanese (1986)	Unknown / Tokuma (1987) (Note: The company responsible for producing the 1987 dub of Castle in the Sky is unknown. This dub is sometimes referred to as the "Streamline dub", which led to a misconception that it was produced by Streamline Pictures themselves. Others attribute the dub to a company called "Magnum". However, the dub was commissioned by Tokuma Shoten and licensed to Streamline for distribution in North America. Fred Patten, a representative for Streamline, reported that it was originally produced for Japan Airlines as on-board entertainment on international flights. According to Streamline's co-founder Carl Macek, Tokuma Shoten had outsourced its production to an unnamed company in Hollywood.)	Disney / Buena Vista (2003)
Pazu	Pazū (パズー)	Mayumi Tanaka	Barbara Goodson	James Van Der Beek
Sheeta	Shīta (シータ)	Keiko Yokozawa	Louise Chambell	Anna Paquin
Sheeta	Shīta (シータ)	Keiko Yokozawa	Louise Chambell	Debi Derryberry (young)
Dola	Dōra (ドーラ)	Kotoe Hatsui	Rachel Vanowen	Cloris Leachman
Muska	Musuka (ムスカ)	Minori Terada	Jack Witte	Mark Hamill
General	Shōgun (将軍)	Ichirō Nagai	Mark Richards	Jim Cummings
Uncle Pom	Pomujī (ポムじい)	Fujio Tokita	Fujio Tokita	Richard Dysart
Mr. Duffi / Boss	Oyakata (親方)	Hiroshi Ito	Charles Wilson	John Hostetter
Charles	Sharuru (シャルル)	Takuzō Kamiyama	Bob Stuart	Michael McShane
Henri	Anri (アンリ)	Sukekiyo Kameyama	Eddie Frierson	Andy Dick
Louis	Rui (ルイ)	Yoshito Yasuhara	Unknown	Mandy Patinkin
Okami / Sheeta's grandmother	Okami (おかみ)	Machiko Washio	Unknown	Tress MacNeille
Madge	Majji (マッジ)	Tarako Isono	Unknown	Debi Derryberry
Motro / Old Engineer	Rōgishi (老技師)	Ryūji Saikachi	Unknown	Eddie Frierson
Train Operator	Keibentetsudō no kikanshi (軽便鉄道の機関士)	Tomomichi Nishimura	Unknown	Matt K. Miller

== Development ==
=== Early concepts ===
Following the success of his previous film, Nausicaä of the Valley of the Wind (1984), Hayao Miyazaki began looking for different projects to direct. Tokuma Shoten, the company backing Miyazaki financially, proposed producing a follow-up to Nausicaä, which he refused. He envisioned creating an old-fashioned adventure film that would be a "pleasure" to watch, for which he took a research trip to the city of Yanagawa. He developed an initial film concept set in the city, tentatively titled Blue Mountains, (Note: Seiji Kanō reported the title of this concept was The City Where the Water Flows (Japanese: 水の流れる街, Hepburn: Mizu no nagareru machi).) which he pitched to Tokuma Shoten in June 1984. However, he stated in a later interview that he "wasn't in shape to direct" at the time, and was unable to make progress on the concept.

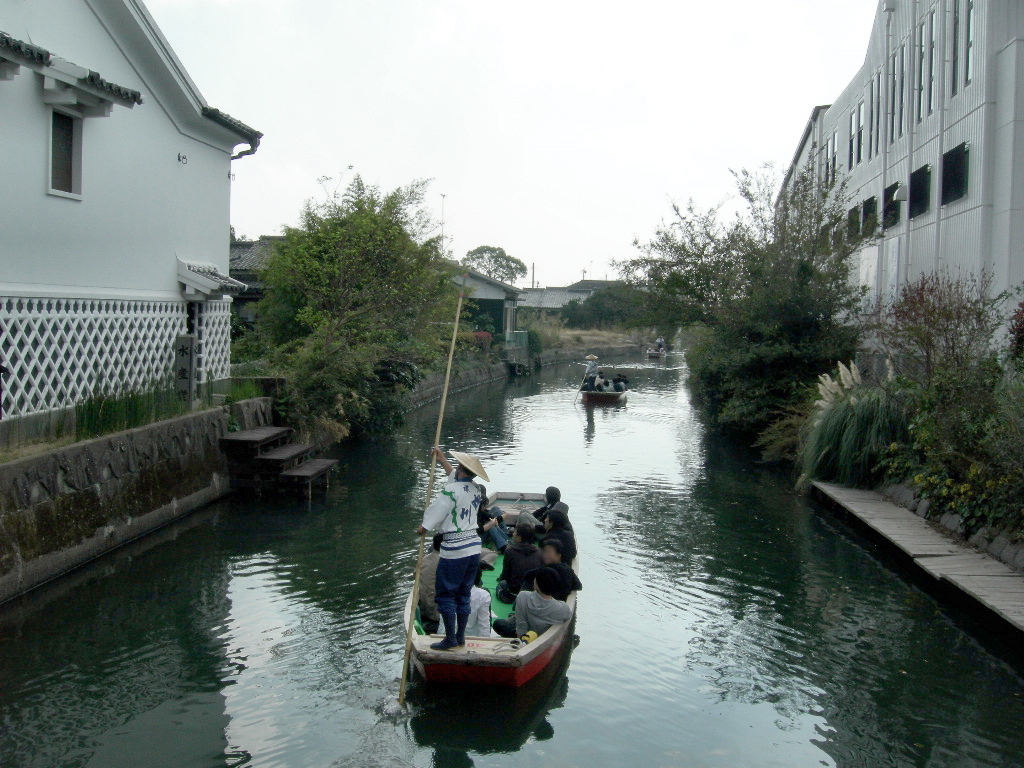
Research for an abandoned concept set in Yanagawa inspired Isao Takahata to create a documentary focusing on the city's canals instead.

The film was never produced, but the city's canals inspired Miyazaki's longtime collaborator, Isao Takahata, to propose they create a documentary about them rather than an animation. This eventually became The Story of Yanagawa's Canals (1987), which focused on the environmental effects of industry on the local waterways. A documentary, however, was unlikely to be commercially viable and had no prospect of support from Tokuma Shoten. Miyazaki therefore financed its production through his personal office, Nibariki, using the profits he had made from Nausicaä.

Takahata rapidly spent the funds on research; to recover the expense and help complete the filming, Toshio Suzuki, an editor of Animage at the time, recommended that Miyazaki direct another film. According to Suzuki, Miyazaki immediately agreed, and quickly developed a concept for the film based on an idea he had in elementary school. (Note: The lead characters' names date back to this story; Pazu is an original name, while Sheeta is derived from the Greek letter theta.) Suzuki later commented that "if Takahata had made his movie on schedule, [Castle in the Sky] wouldn't have been born".

=== Pre-production ===
Miyazaki completed a project proposal in December 1984, tentatively titled Young Boy Pazu. (Note: Japanese: 少年パズー, Hepburn: Shōnen Pazū. A few other titles were suggested in the proposal, including Mystery of the Levitation Crystal and Flying Treasure Island.) According to the animation scholar Seiji Kanō, its concepts constituted a "direct rebellion" against popular animation trends at the time; instead of a protagonist with superhuman powers and a futuristic setting, the proposal featured an ordinary child within a fantastical nineteenth-century period. Although Miyazaki had expected Nausicaä to appeal to teenagers, he realized that his audience also included many younger children. This led him to conceptualize a film catered to this demographic, opposed to the trend of increasingly adult-oriented animations.

The proposal was also unusual in that it did not adapt an already-successful manga, which weakened its commercial potential. Feeling that it was unlikely to be green-lit, Miyazaki preemptively began work on a back-up proposal. However, Tokuma Shoten was eager to back Young Boy Pazu, and immediately approved it to begin production, with Takahata acting as producer as he had done on Nausicaä. Miyazaki continued working on the proposal, producing a second draft in February 1985. Kanō wrote that this one contained a shift towards a more realistic perspective; refinements were made to the plot, multiple settings were described in detail, and additional characters were included.

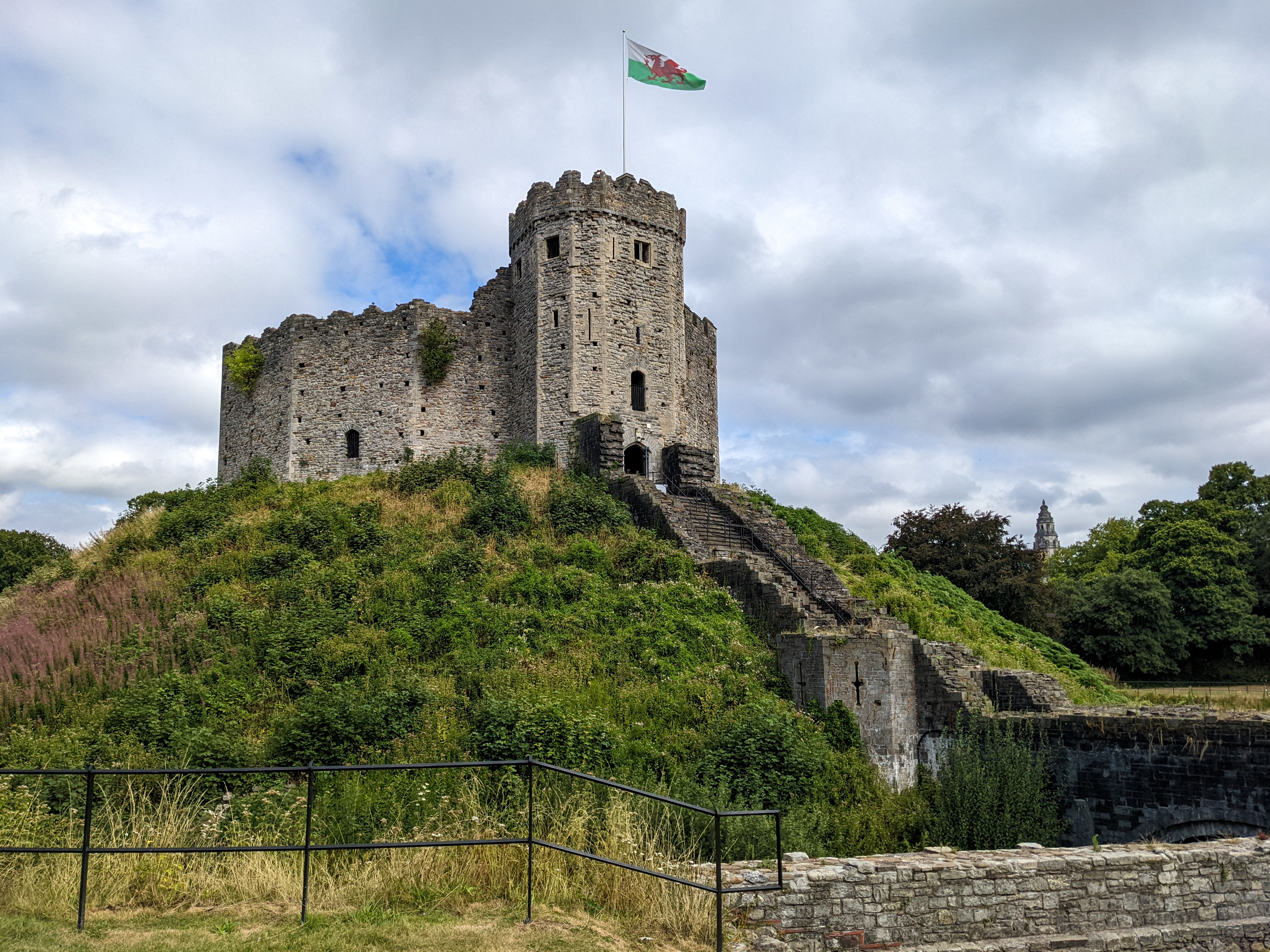
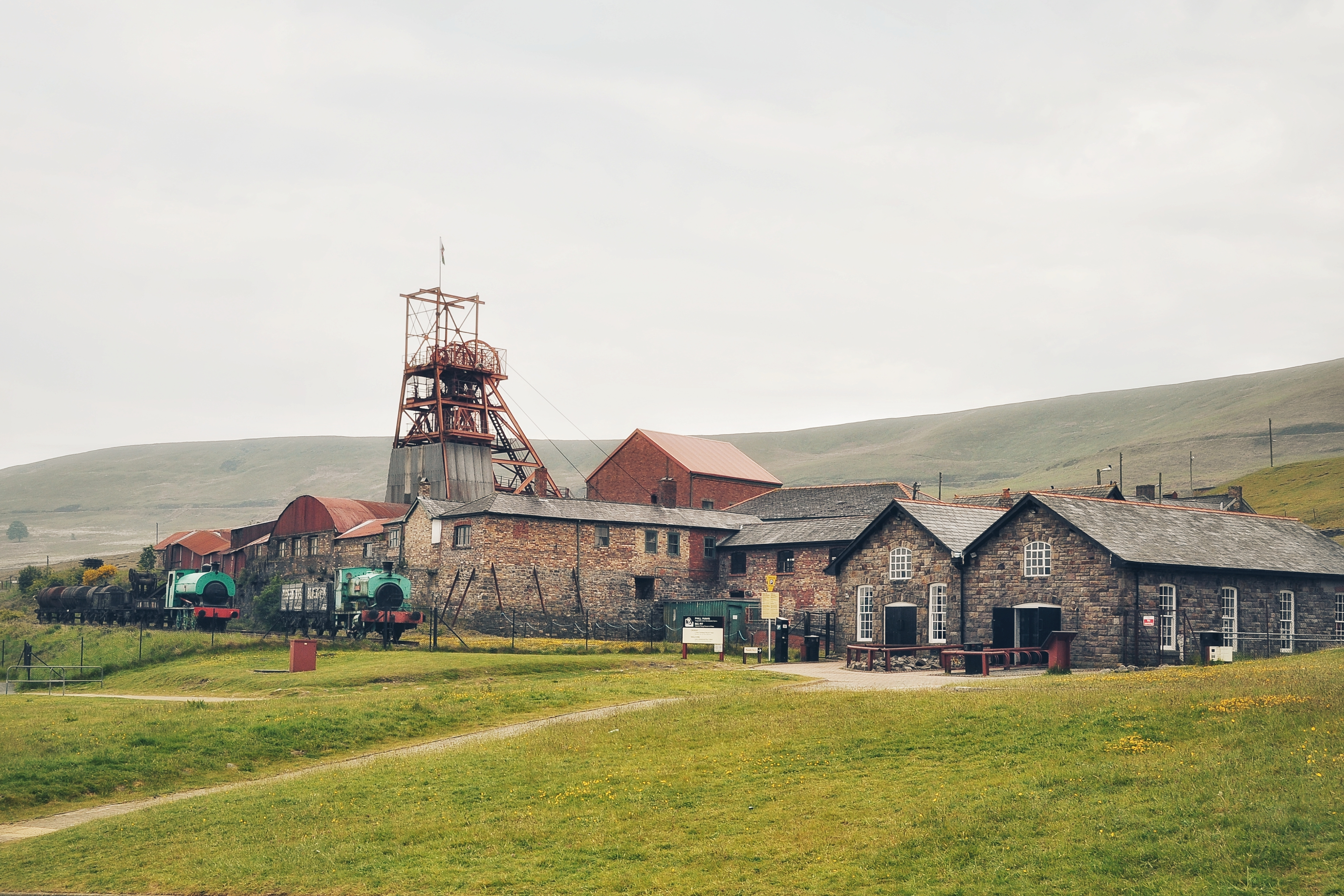
Cardiff Castle (top) and Big Pit Mine (bottom) in southern Wales, where Miyazaki visited during his location scouting trip

Miyazaki had previously visited the country of Wales in 1984, where he witnessed the 1984–1985 coal miners' strike in protest of the push from Margaret Thatcher's government to close many of the mines. On Takahata's suggestion, Miyazaki traveled there again in May 1985 to conduct location scouting for the film. With Takahata and Suzuki occupied with the documentary and with building the film's production crew, Miyazaki went alone. Although using real locations as inspirations for fictional settings was a common practice among Japanese animators, Miyazaki's intention for the film was only a generally Western appearance.

He was significantly influenced by the region's architecture and landscapes; the Big Pit Mine – by then converted into a museum – influenced the opening scenes set in the mining village. Cardiff Castle, and other edifices like it around Wales, provided references for the film's Titus Fort. He was moved by the empty facilities and defeated atmosphere of the miners he witnessed, which resonated with him politically and influenced the themes that he eventually explored. (Note: See § Working-class moralities for further information.)

=== Writing and production ===
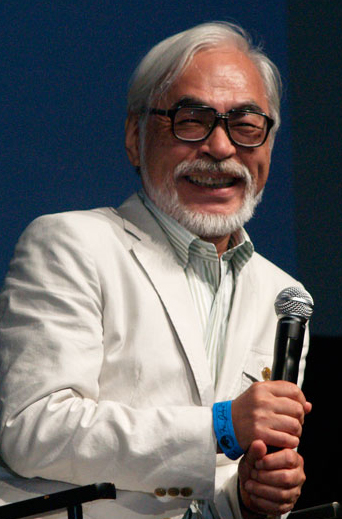
Hayao Miyazaki (pictured in 2009), the writer and director

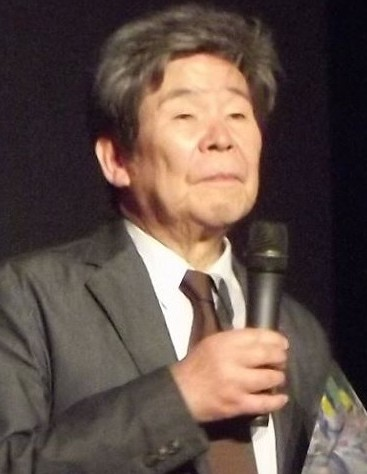
Isao Takahata (2014), the producer

While Miyazaki was away, Takahata, Suzuki, and Tokuma Shoten's Yasuyoshi Tokuma searched for an animation studio willing to take on the new production, but were unsuccessful. The company responsible for Nausicaä's production, Topcraft, had gone bankrupt around the time. They therefore decided to set up a new studio, hiring some of their previous collaborators, including Tōru Hara – Topcraft's founder – and the colorist Michiyo Yasuda. After scouting several properties on which to set up an office, they selected a location in Tokyo's Kichijōji neighborhood, and were set to begin production upon Miyazaki's return. Studio Ghibli opened on June 15, 1985, as a subsidiary of Tokuma Shoten. (Note: The circumstances surrounding the formation of Studio Ghibli are the subject of debate among animation scholars. See Denison 2018 and Denison 2023 for further information.)

Along with some initial sketches of the visuals, Miyazaki began working on the script on June 17, the first draft of which was completed by the end of the month. The film's title, Laputa: Castle in the Sky, was finalized. This draft's plot was similar to that of the finished film until the substantially different final act: Sheeta and Pazu remained separated throughout their time on Laputa, more scenes of violence and strife that occur there were included, and additional runtime was spent on an exploration of Muska's character. Takahata and Suzuki, who felt that this deviated from the intended adventurous mood, advised Miyazaki to make revisions.

A second script draft was finished on July 22. In addition to changes to the second half of the plot, new elements began to appear: the power of Sheeta's necklace became tied to her thoughts, and Laputa's natural elements were emphasized. However, other concepts that had featured in Miyazaki's concept art for several years, such as a scene in which Sheeta and Pazu pilot an ornithopter, were cut. Miyazaki also began the storyboarding around this time.

Studio Ghibli gradually built its production staff over the following months and began work on the main animation, recruiting animators from companies they had previously worked with, such as Telecom Animation Film, Toei Animation, and Nippon Animation. The key animation was done by a team of 21, and other studios, such as Doga Kobo and Oh! Production, provided support for the in-between animation. Unusually for the industry, two art directors were assigned to create the backgrounds; these were made with watercolors or other kinds of paint on paper.

By January 1986, 33 people were working on the project in total. Filming of completed sequences began the following month, and a teaser trailer was sent out to theaters. Miyazaki finalized the storyboards; according to Kanō, they required significant condensing, as the original plan would have run over three hours. The final runtime was just over two hours, making it Miyazaki's longest film at the time.

=== Animation and special effects ===
Castle in the Sky was animated by hand using at least 69,262 cel drawings. (Note: Some sources claimed that the film uses as many as 75,000 cels.) Hara said that the studio was "aiming for a manga-like feel", which they planned to accomplish with a limited color palette. However, they ended up using over 300 shades, which Yasuda attributed to the varied lighting conditions across the film; by comparison, Nausicaä had used only around 250. The lead animator Yoshinori Kanada was hired in August 1985, and the first task he was delegated was to experiment on the flaptors – the flying machines used by Dola's gang in the film. He attempted multiple approaches to portray their insect-like wings, eventually deciding upon drybrushed strokes to imply rapid motion.

Certain special effects from the film use a combination of cel and film techniques. For example, double exposures in which parts of the image are exposed only once, creating the effect of semi-transparency; this technique was used in the film to depict Laputa's holograms. The opening sequence uses multiple "transmitted light" techniques – in which the film is deliberately overexposed, allowing light to bleed into adjacent sections of the image – to convey the luminance of the crystal necklace. According to Hara, the majority of the cels had been completed by May 1986, but around 30% required retouching during the filming process.

Some of the film's shots make use of the Harmony Process, a technique pioneered by Noriko Takaya. This involved cutting cels into custom shapes and painting them in the style of a background layer, which could then be moved between frames in a manner comparable to stop-motion animation. This allowed certain foreground elements to be highly detailed as, unlike the other cels, they did not have to be redrawn on every frame. An early shot of the Goliath airship that Takaya worked on features Harmony elements, and a similar technique was used to animate the storm initially obscuring Laputa.

=== Casting and voice acting ===
Auditions for the voice cast began in May 1986, led by Miyazaki, Takahata, and Shigeharu Shiba, the film's sound director. Pazu was initially intended to be voiced by a young boy, but they found the audition performances unsatisfactory. Shiba eventually recommended Mayumi Tanaka, who was known for other voice roles playing children. For Sheeta, Miyazaki requested they cast someone other than Sumi Shimamoto, who had voiced the female leads of his two previous films; they finally decided on Keiko Yokozawa, a veteran voice actor who had also tried out for the lead role in Nausicaä.

Minori Terada (Muska) and Kotoe Hatsui (Dola) were considered unusual choices, as they were both known more for their careers in live-action films. Shiba stated that Terada was selected in part due to his voice's similarity to the actor Jinpachi Nezu's, but that he and Miyazaki had also been impressed by Terada's work on the Japanese dub of Blade Runner (1982). Shiba considered casting a comedian from the Kansai region as Dola, but Miyazaki found their dialect of Japanese to be undesirable. However, after he happened to view a television program in which Hatsui talked about her past, Shiba was impressed by her voice and personality, and handed her the role.

The voice recordings took place over three days in late June and early July. As further changes had been made to the story since the last script draft, the scripts given to the voice actors consisted of dialog extracted from the storyboards. Terada, who was voicing an animated character for the first time, initially had difficulty delivering his lines in sync with Muska's lip movements; however, he grasped the technique during rehearsals and, according to Shiba, made a confident performance.

== Themes ==
=== Roles of nature and technology ===
Castle in the Sky contains a strong theme of environmentalism, questioning humanity's relationship with nature and the role of technology. McCarthy interprets the giant tree of Laputa as a "metaphor for the reviving and life-giving power of nature". However, in contrast with the more optimistic conclusions of Miyazaki's previous works, Napier notes that the film ends with an "unsettling view" of the castle flying away, suggesting that humanity may not deserve to exist in the natural world. Literary scholar Anthony Lioi interprets Laputa as an ecological utopia that demonstrates the peace that can be established between nature and advanced technology, but also serves as a criticism of modernity when "[the] peace is shattered by human violence". Lioi notes that this outlook differs from dominant Western ideas, eschewing the extremes of capitalism and industrialism, as well as radical environmentalism and conservationism.

While Laputa's giant tree is seen as a metaphor for the restorative capability of the natural world, its underside is a symbol of the immorality of modernity.

Critics note the philosophical ambiguity of the castle; while Laputa initially appears to be an ideal union of nature and technology, it is later revealed to have a much harsher and more oppressive underside; Napier writes that Laputa is "deeply paradoxical". Laputa itself takes direct inspiration from the island of the same name from Gulliver's Travels (1726), and film scholar Cristina Cardia claims that, like its namesake, the island is introduced with benign intentions but is ultimately "exploited for perverse ends, in this case war". Lioi argues that Laputa is used as a means to comment on the ethics of contemporary culture, based on Ildney Cavalcanti's observation that such a utopia also "must contain an overtly dystopian element, such that the implicit critique in utopian discourse becomes explicit". However, he interprets the ultimate destruction of the castle's weapons as a demonstration that "violence is not the heart of the city", and that the dystopic elements of modernity can be healed.

The film also presents an ambiguous view on the usage of technology. The robots from Laputa provide an example of this view, as they are introduced in the film as a violent force capable of extreme destruction. However, when the protagonists next meet a robot, it is entirely peaceful, tending to the gardens and fauna on Laputa. Lioi argues that the robots, as a representation of Laputan technology, are caretakers by default and only become destructive in response to human brutality. Greenberg observes that the film depicts machinelike efficiency as something that "can be put to both positive and negative ends anywhere, at any time, and how it is put to use always depends on the choices made by the people who use the machines, leaders and citizens alike". McCarthy argues that "this is not a comment on technology but on man's inability to use it wisely". Odell and Le Blanc conclude that "technology ... is not necessarily a bad thing, but we must consider how it's used and to what extent". The duality of nature and technology is further explored in Miyazaki's later film Princess Mononoke (1997).

=== Innocence of children ===
Like many other films by Miyazaki, Castle in the Sky features young children as protagonists. Miyazaki values the portrayal of children as good-hearted, confident in their own agency, and resilient and upbeat in response to adversity. He criticized reviewers of his television series Future Boy Conan (1978) who described the titular character as "too much of a goody-two-shoes", admitting he was tempted to retort "So you want to see 'bad characters', you fool?" Film critics Colin Odell and Michelle Le Blanc argue that creating a film with younger protagonists generates perspectives that an adult would not perceive, saying "the children in Ghibli's films are a liberating force that allows anything to be possible".

The lack of parental oversight of the protagonists is an element Miyazaki feels to be important in promoting children's independence. The protagonists of his films are, like Sheeta and Pazu, often orphaned, or in some way parted from their parents. Miyazaki believes that "one of the essential elements of most classical children's literature is that the children in the stories actually fend for themselves". The presence of parents, in his opinion, would stifle the children's autonomy. The limitations that children have in their abilities are also explored in the film; for example, Pazu comes close to forsaking Sheeta and his quest for Laputa. Additionally, unlike Miyazaki's previous works, the protagonists do not succeed at convincing the antagonists of their wrongdoing, which offers a more pessimistic view on children's ability to educate others.

Napier proposes that Miyazaki's insistence on showing the freedom of children in Castle in the Sky can be credited to the influence of Panda and the Magic Serpent (1958). Miyazaki first watched the film at age 17, and it moved him to pursue a career in animation. At a lecture given in 1982 at Waseda University, he said "When I saw Panda and the Magic Serpent, it was as if the scales fell from my eyes; I realized that I should depict the honesty and goodness of children in my work." He considers this a focal point in his endeavors. The theme of innocence is explored further in Miyazaki's succeeding film My Neighbor Totoro (1988).

=== Working-class moralities ===
While in Wales for his location scouting, Miyazaki witnessed the aftermath of the 1984–1985 coal miners' strike. Their ultimate failure to preserve the industry left a lasting impact on him; he viewed the event as an attack by the powerful on the miners' way of life and hard-working spirit. His experiences are reflected in several supporting characters in the film, who, despite living impoverished lives of hard labor in the mines, enthusiastically protect the protagonists from multiple aggressors. Napier argued that this depiction reveals Miyazaki's yearning for a simpler way of life and a desire to create a story based in optimism. Miyazaki later stated that he had "felt a real sense of solidarity with the mine workers" while in Wales; Kanō speculated that they reminded him of his time in a labor union while working at Toei Animation. The animation scholar Helen McCarthy wrote that the film "also contains echoes of the struggle of the Welsh people for nationhood and freedom". Miyazaki visited Wales once more in 1986, ahead of the release of the film. In 2005, he told The Guardian "I admired those men, I admired the way they battled to save their way of life, just as the coal miners in Japan did. Many people of my generation see the miners as a symbol, a dying breed of fighting men. Now they are gone."

== Style ==
=== Combinations of prior work ===
Scholars have argued that Castle in the Sky represents an amalgamation of much of Miyazaki's prior work; the animation scholar Raz Greenberg felt that the film is "deeply rooted" within the previous twenty years of his career. On his creative process, Miyazaki said that "popular culture is characterized by repeated arrangements ... what we want to inherit is what transcends time". Kanō noted that this "reconstructive approach" mirrored the compositional styles of classical writers. He saw this film as the meeting point of Miyazaki's "two opposing tendencies": the lighthearted cartoon tone he had established in works like The Castle of Cagliostro and Sherlock Hound, and the serious exploration of modern themes in Nausicaä.

Miyazaki stated that he based Sheeta in part on the character Hilda from The Great Adventure of Horus, Prince of the Sun (1968), a Takahata-directed project he had contributed significantly to; both characters suffer hardship after inheriting powerful pendants. Lamarre found thematic parallels between the film and Miyazaki's series Future Boy Conan (1978), including the post-apocalyptic setting and the protagonists' struggles to keep powerful men from deploying weapons of mass destruction. Some of the animals that appear on Laputa are references to Miyazaki's prior works. The robots are based on a similar character from Lupin the 3rd Part I (1971–1972) – a series Miyazaki and Takahata had partly directed – which was in turn inspired by The Mechanical Monsters (1941), a Superman short film directed by Dave Fleischer. Scenes from Miyazaki's manga Sabaku no Tami (1969–1970) also bear resemblances to moments in the film.

=== Literary influences ===
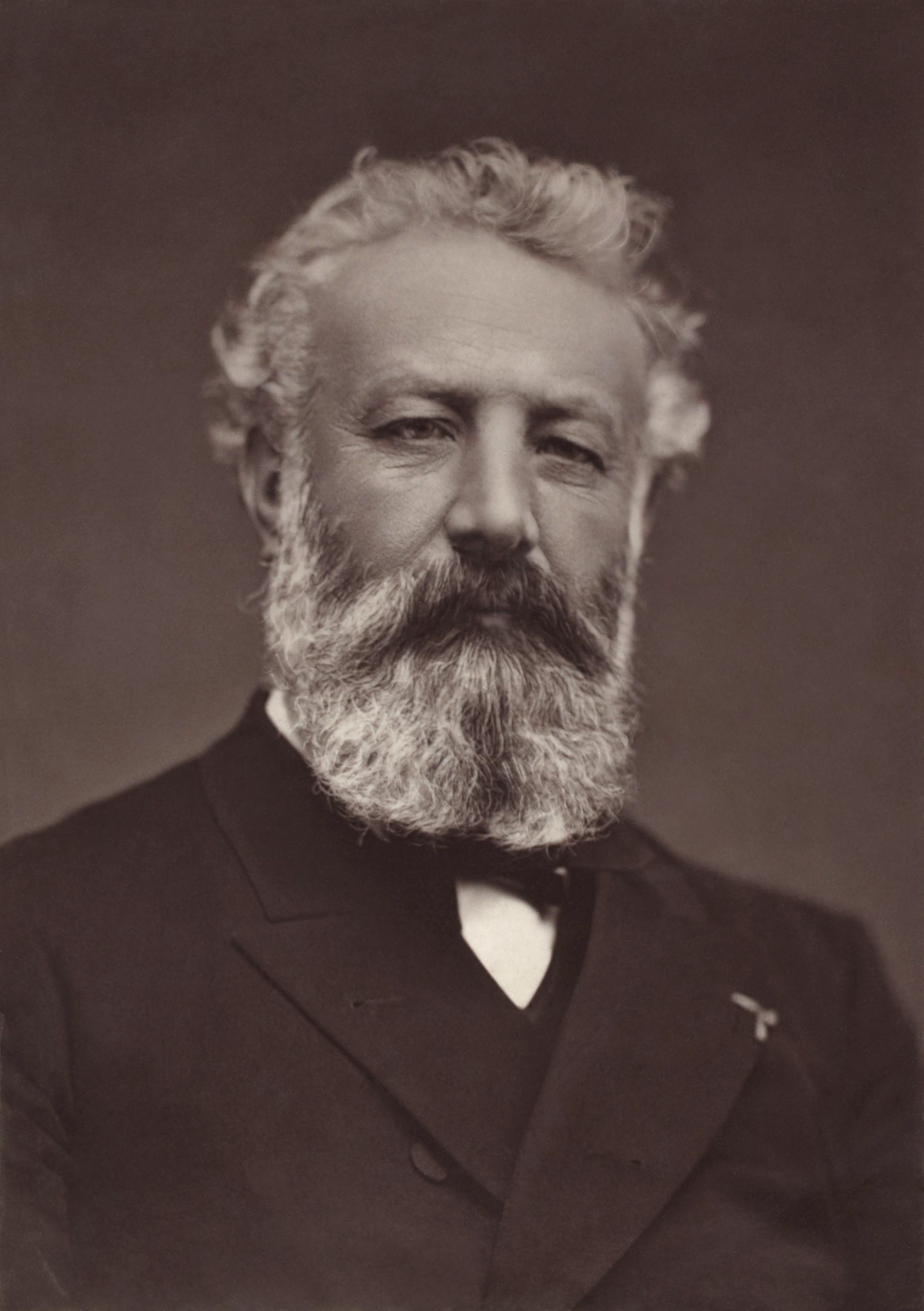
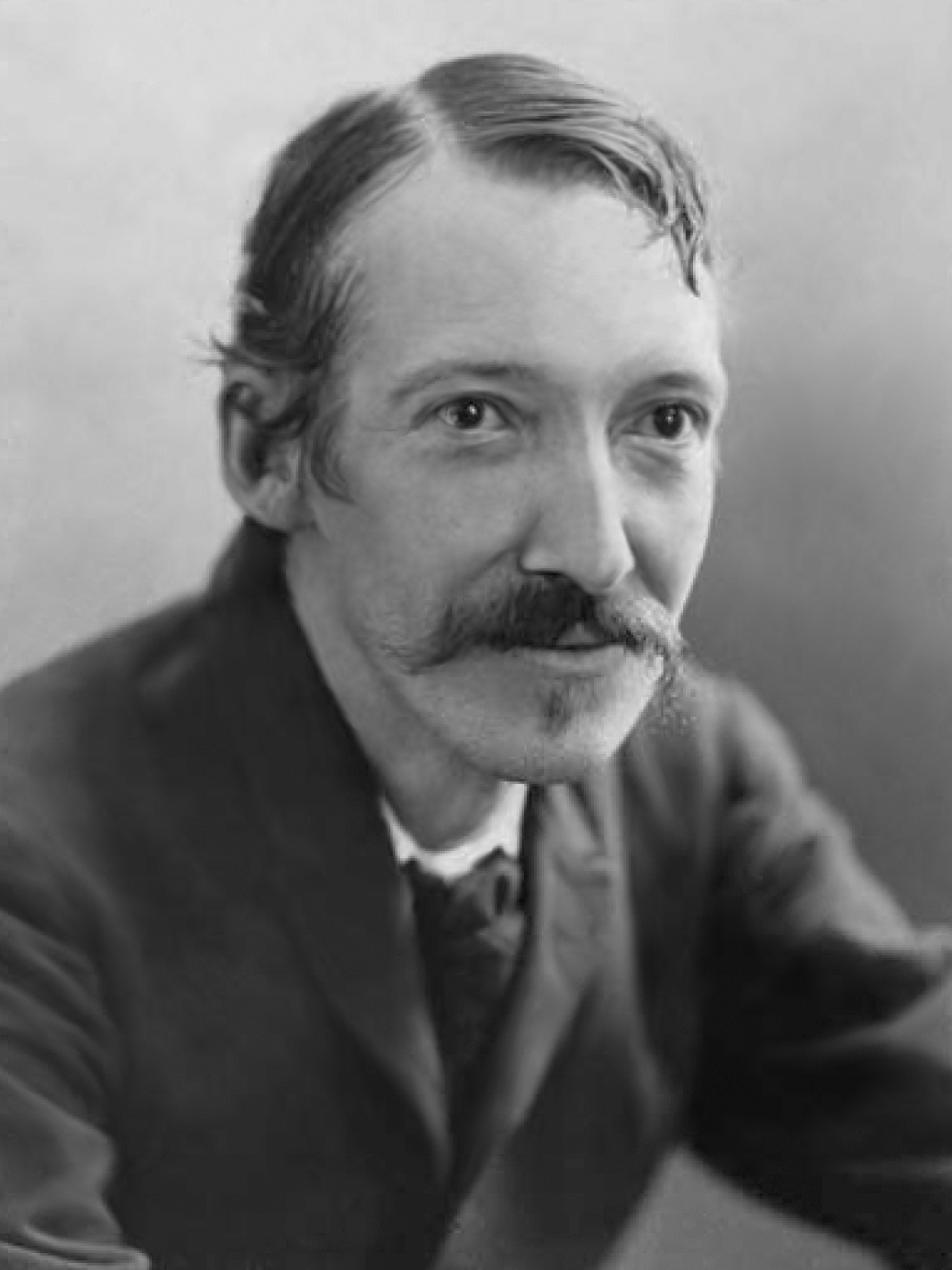
The works of Jules Verne (pictured in 1884, top) and Robert Louis Stevenson (1893, bottom) were influential on the film's style.

Miyazaki was stylistically inspired by the literature of Jules Verne and Robert Louis Stevenson. Among Miyazaki's early intentions for the film was a revival of the classical adventure narrative in the manner of Stevenson's Treasure Island (1883). While at Toei Animation years prior, Miyazaki had worked on Animal Treasure Island (1971), an adaptation of the novel. Treasure Island also became a primary influence on Castle in the Sky.

Many of the machines in the film are retrofuturistic, influenced by nineteenth-century designs. The flying islands in the opening credits sequence are reminiscent of Verne's novel Propeller Island (1895). In the film's proposal, Miyazaki expressed a desire to depict machines that "still possess the inherent warmth of handcrafted things". Influenced by Verne's style, the film envisions an alternative history featuring advanced technology, which scholars later analyzed as an example of steampunk. Commenting on the mecha anime popular at the time, Miyazaki expressed his hatred for shows that glorified machines without portraying the characters struggling to build or maintain them. Kanō placed the film in opposition with cyberpunk, writing that it attempts to "understand the present from the past", aligning with other steampunk works.

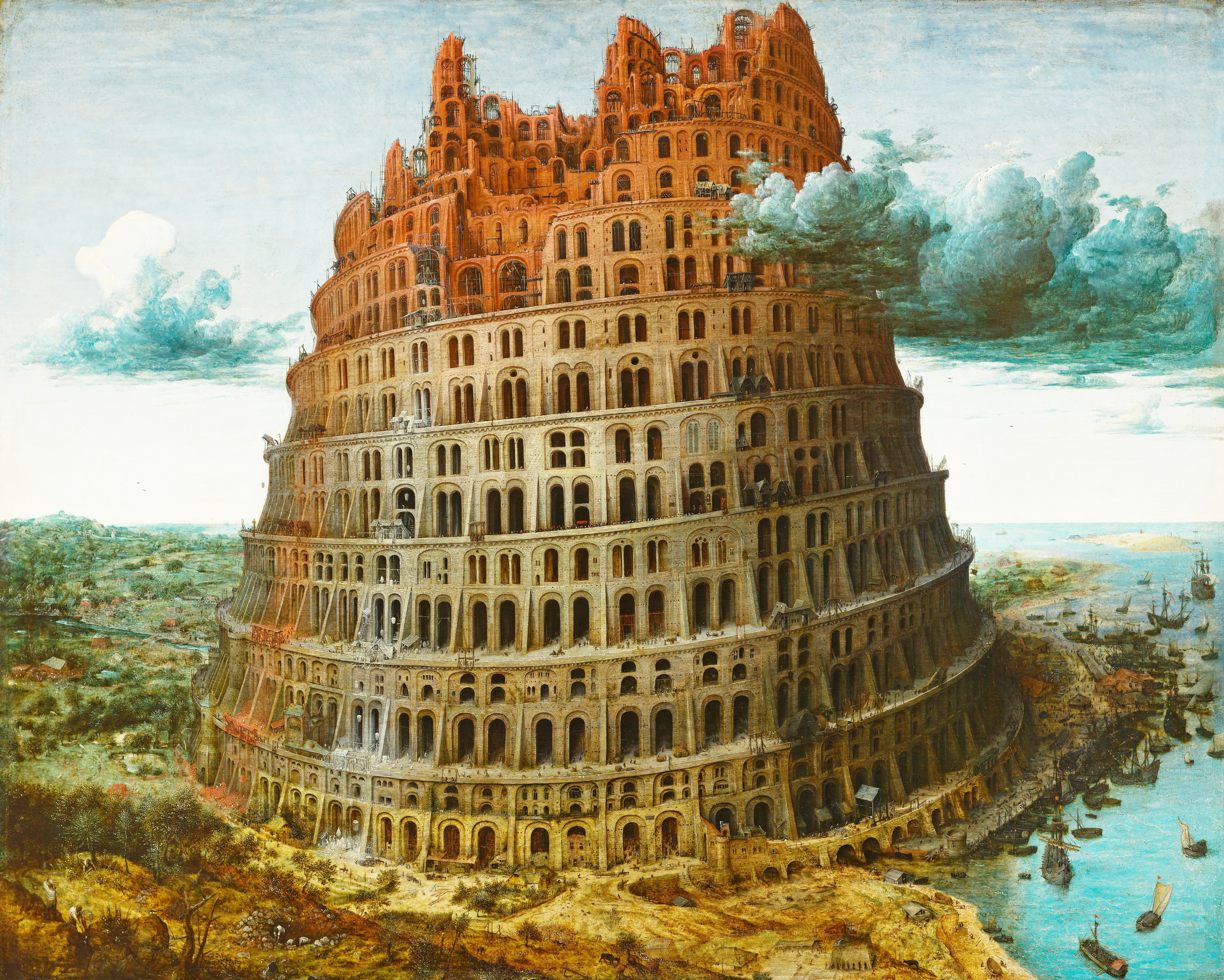
Among other sources, the design of Laputa was likely influenced by The Tower of Babel (c. 1563).

Studying early drawings for the film, Kanō argued that Miyazaki had likely incorporated elements of the Tower of Babel, a mythical structure in the Book of Genesis, when conceiving the island of Laputa. He found its design reminiscent of a painting of the tower (c. 1563) by Pieter Bruegel the Elder. Abeline also found Ancient Greek and Babylonian architectural influences.

In the scene where Muska deploys Laputa's weaponry, he claims it represents the arrow of Indra and was responsible for the destruction of the cities of Sodom and Gomorrah, allusions to the Ramayana and the Old Testament respectively. Miyazaki had previously been requested to adapt the Ramayana into an animated film, and although he declined the offer, he said that ideas he had encountered in his research – such as theories of the ancient Indians possessing nuclear weaponry – left an impression on him. (Note: Miyazaki denied other parallels with the Ramayana, however, such as the similarity between the names of Sheeta and Sita, a character from the myth.)

=== Comparison with Gulliver's Travels ===
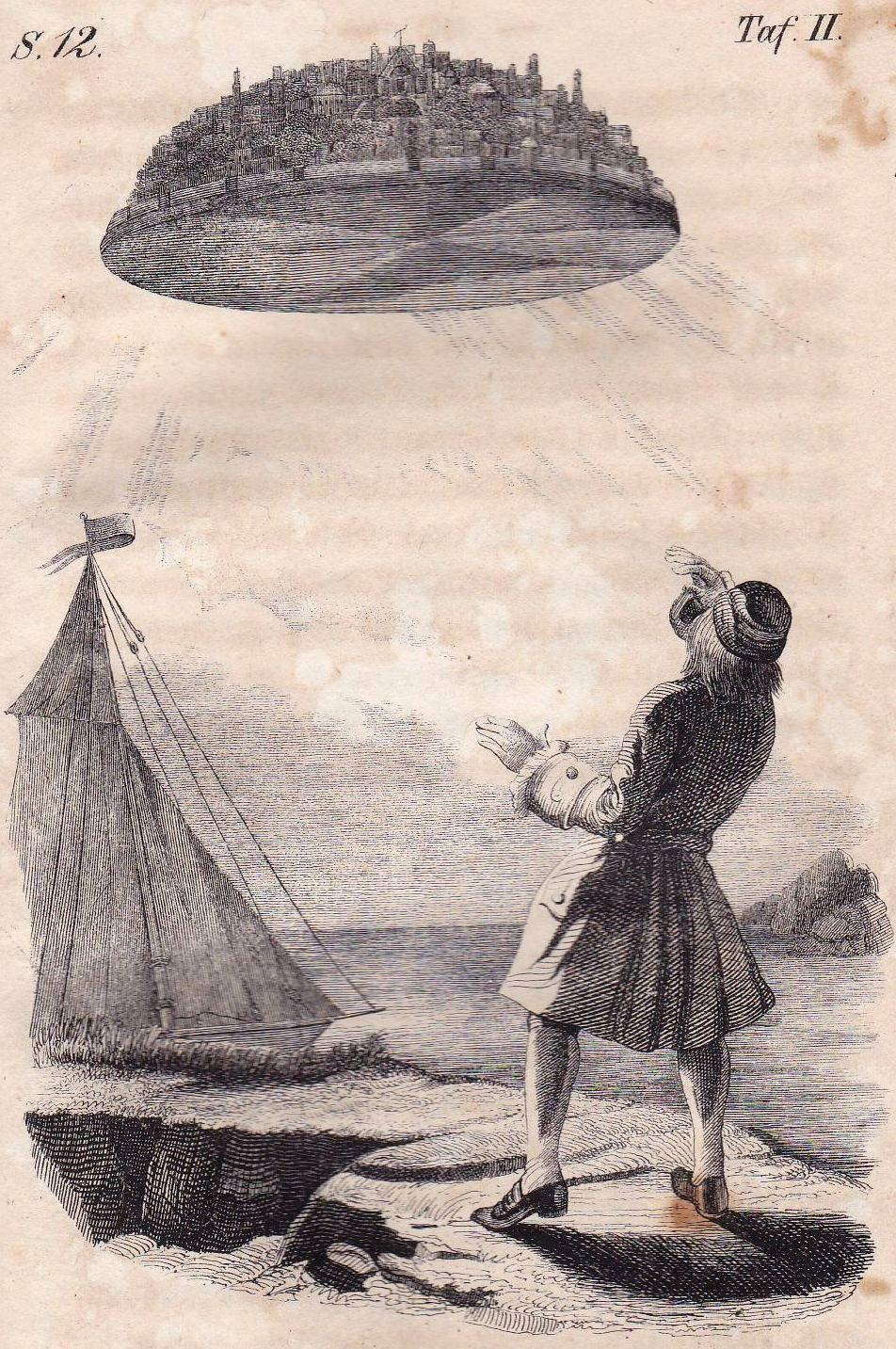
Laputa, the flying island in Gulliver's Travels (1726), was the namesake of the film's setting.

The film's titular castle takes its name from Laputa, the flying island from Jonathan Swift's novel Gulliver's Travels (1726). Treasure Island provided Laputa's foundation in the narrative, but the idea that it would fly came from Swift. Miyazaki traced his connection with the novel to a library copy he had read in middle school; the literary scholar Brian Milthorpe proposed that he was referring to one of a series of abridged classics published by Sogensha for children. He also recalled watching Fleischer's film Gulliver's Travels (1939) as a youth.

While at Toei, Miyazaki had worked as a key animator on Gulliver's Travels Beyond the Moon (1965), a loose adaptation of Swift. Miyazaki had suggested an alternative ending in which a robot is unexpectedly revealed to be a human princess. The film's director, Yasuo Ōtsuka, was impressed by this change and later spoke of it as an early example of Miyazaki's tendency toward humanist themes. Miyazaki, however, dismissed the importance of the novel in interviews for Castle in the Sky, saying that he included it in the film to sway potential sponsors and that he had "never read [it] in earnest even once".

Nevertheless, Milthorpe argued that Miyazaki's personal experience with the novel undergoes a "fictionalization". He found the narrative of Pazu's search for Laputa mirrored Miyazaki's process of adaptation; both seek the ideal of the island without engaging with the work in which it originated. In the film, Pazu dismisses Swift's tale as "just fantasy". Milthorpe analyzed this as a metalepsis; the film integrates another work of fiction into its diegesis, yet frames it as fictional within its internal logic.

Swift intended Laputa as a satire of the scientists of his time, particularly members of the Royal Society, whose speculative theories he viewed as departures from common sense. The denizens of the island are depicted as completely disconnected from reality. The film does not take a satirical tone, but inherits Swift's style of presenting the fictional as real. Sheeta and Pazu's exploration of Laputa parallels the travelogue form of Gulliver's Travels, according to Milthorpe, and the islands in both works are suspended by great floating stones.

Swift's Laputa is also used as a weapon of mass destruction to exercise domination over the region underneath it; this aspect of the island critiqued the Crown's use of power, particularly in Ireland. The desire to use the island as an instrument of political subjugation forms the basis of Muska's motivation in the film. Miyazaki's island, however, is an ambiguous symbol unlike its namesake. (Note: See § Roles of nature and technology for further information.) Milthorpe analyzed it as a danger only due to Muska's refusal to acknowledge its nuances and relationships with fiction.

== Release ==
=== Marketing ===
To finance part of the production and the marketing campaign, Tokuma Shoten hired the advertising agency Dentsu to find tie-in sponsors, and they selected Toshiba and Ajinomoto. An initial contract, which would have allowed them free use of film footage in commercials, was rejected by Takahata. This decision was likely due to his lingering concerns about Nausicaä's campaign, where the studio had lost control over how their content was used. The studio therefore allowed sponsors to use only concept sketches and the film's logo in promotional materials.

While advertisements were run in several local newspapers, and the Kinema Junpo magazine featured the film on the cover of its August 1986 edition, Animage – Tokuma Shoten's specialist magazine – limited its promotional effort. While Nausicaä had been the subject of regular features and interviews, it published only an illustrated serial novel for this film. The magazine was being criticized at the time for its promotion of Tokuma productions, and Kanō speculated that this may have contributed to the reduction in marketing.

Ajinomoto created two varieties of branded fruit-flavored sodas featuring illustrations by Miyazaki, and launched a widespread campaign to publicize them beginning in April 1986. This included sweepstakes for branded merchandise – among the prizes were high fidelity sound systems with the film's title, provided by Toshiba – a telephone advertisement service, and a competition to be selected as a "Laputa Reporter" for the Osaka region.

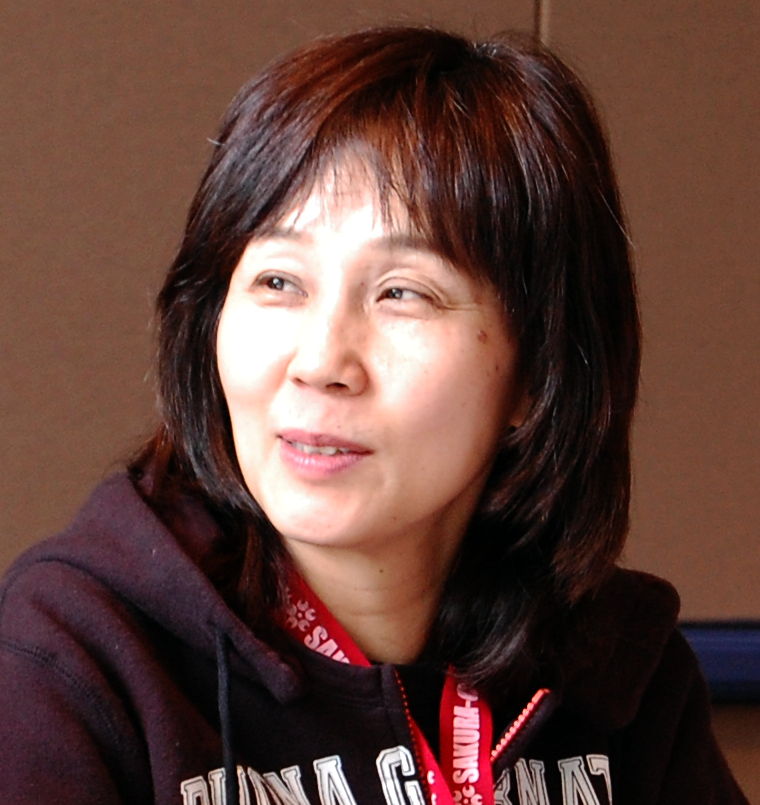
Sumi Shimamoto (pictured in 2007), a lead voice actor from Nausicaä of the Valley of the Wind (1984), narrated commercials for this film.

Due to Studio Ghibli's restrictions on the footage, the television commercials instead featured a live-action adaptation of the film's elements. A life-size model of a flaptor was created, reportedly at an expense of ¥10 million to Ajinomoto, and various specialized equipment was purchased to film it. Two actors were hired to play Pazu and Sheeta, and the narration was provided by Sumi Shimamoto and Yōji Matsuda, the lead voice actors from Nausicaä.

The production of these commercials was the subject of significant coverage in Animage, where the challenges and spectacle of the live-action medium were emphasized; the animation scholar Rayna Denison argued that, inadvertently or not, the campaign became a distraction from the film rather than a supportive accompaniment. However, despite the campaign running during the hot Japanese summer, the drinks did not become particularly popular, only selling around a third of the anticipated 30 million bottles.

The film was additionally promoted with two episodes from Sherlock Hound (1984–1985), a television series Miyazaki had co-directed with Kyōsuke Mikuriya, which would be shown along with the film in theaters. (Note: The episodes in question were "Mrs. Hudson is Taken Hostage" and "The White Cliffs of Dover".) This was an established tactic at the time, and two other episodes had previously been screened during Nausicaä's theatrical run. Denison felt that the more lighthearted episodes were used to compensate for the film's heavier tone, increasing the program's appeal for a general audience. However, unlike with Nausicaä, the episodes in question had already been aired on television. They were also, according to Kanō, of lower animation quality compared with the rest of the series, and held "questionable" potential to attract audiences.

=== Japanese release ===
A major promotional event was held in Shibuya on July 20, 1986, which was attended by key staff and the lead voice actors. The film premiered on July 25 at the Tokyo Chamber of Commerce and Industry. Preview screenings were held over the following week in major Japanese cities with posters put out by the publicity department at the Toei Company, based on illustrations by Miyazaki. These received positive feedback, and the film was publicly recommended by local film societies and children's welfare committees.

On August 2, Castle in the Sky was released by Toei in 103 theaters around Japan. In its 14-day run in theaters, it attracted 774,271 viewers, earning an estimated ¥1.16 billion at the box office and ¥583 million from distribution rentals. This was only around two-thirds of the earnings made from Nausicaä, and Miyazaki and Suzuki expressed their disappointment with these figures.

The animation scholar Shiro Yoshioka argued that the restrictions on the marketing were a factor in the film's lower returns. Kanō also wrote that the film's runtime, coupled with the length of the Sherlock Hound episodes, limited the number of screenings that could take place per day. Miyazaki himself attributed the lack of viewership to his defiance of genre expectations and the comparatively unremarkable protagonist. (Note: See § Pre-production for further information.)

=== English dubs ===
The first English dub was produced by an unknown company in Hollywood. It was first screened in Hong Kong on June 26, 1987, with Chinese subtitles, earning around HK$13 million in three months at the box office. It debuted in the United States on July 14, 1987, at the Los Angeles Animation Celebration. The dub was screened at the London Film Festival in November, and an edited version briefly aired on television in the United Kingdom. (Note: The 1987 dub was aired by ITV in some regions of the eastern UK. This airing was altered from the original, with some scenes being cut, and the film being listed on programs as Laputa: The Flying Island.) The film was licensed for theatrical distribution in North America in 1989 by the then-new Streamline Pictures; the release was relatively limited, and its box office earnings are unknown.

Following the distribution deal struck between Tokuma Shoten and Disney in 1997, which included terms for the dubbing and international release of all Studio Ghibli films, a second English dub was produced. Well-known actors were cast, including James Van Der Beek (Pazu), Anna Paquin (Sheeta), and Mark Hamill (Muska). Due to the possible confusion with the Spanish phrase la puta – literally 'the whore' (Note: Miyazaki stated that he had not been aware of this meaning during the production, and only later learned that Jonathan Swift had named the island in Gulliver's Travels (1726) ironically.) – the film was re-titled simply to Castle in the Sky. After its completion in 2000, it premiered at the New York International Children's Film Festival on February 4. However, following the poor performance of Princess Mononoke in North American theaters, the intended nationwide theatrical release was canceled, and the home media release was postponed.

=== Home media and other releases ===
Following the Japanese theatrical release, Tokuma Shoten released the film on VHS in August 1986, and a version on LaserDisc was released the next month. These sold approximately 80,000 copies over the following three years. A number of books related to the film were published by Studio Ghibli, including an art book and a comic-book version using stills from the film.

The film gradually gained popularity through subsequent television broadcasts – screenings on Nippon Television from 1988 to 2004 received viewership rates between 12 and 22 percent – and earned a significant additional amount through re-releases. In Japan, Buena Vista reissued the VHS in 1998, which sold around 1 million copies. Two DVD collections put out in 2002 sold another 500,000 copies. In the United Kingdom, it was the eighth-best-selling foreign language film on home video in 2019. The film has made additional earnings in multiple international theatrical re-runs; it made US$6.6 million between 2003 and 2019, and US$19.8 million between 2020 and 2026, including at the annual Studio Ghibli Fest.

The 2003 English dub was released on DVD in North America on April 15, 2003. Optimum released a Blu-ray version in the United Kingdom in 2011, which Buena Vista brought to North America in 2012; The Numbers estimated the latter earned US$10.3 million. After assuming the distribution rights to Studio Ghibli's catalog in North America, GKIDS re-issued the Blu-rays and DVDs in 2017. Both the original Japanese version and the 2003 English dub were made available for streaming when the rights to Studio Ghibli's filmography were acquired by Netflix in 2020.

The film was released theatrically in France on January 15, 2003, bringing in 615,374 viewers over the span of a month. The film was subsequently released on DVD there, as well as in Italy and Spain. It had a theatrical and home media release in South Korea in 2004. It made its theatrical debut in China on June 1, 2023, making CN¥76 million (US$10.7 million) in its first week, and US$16.5 million as of 2026.

== Music ==
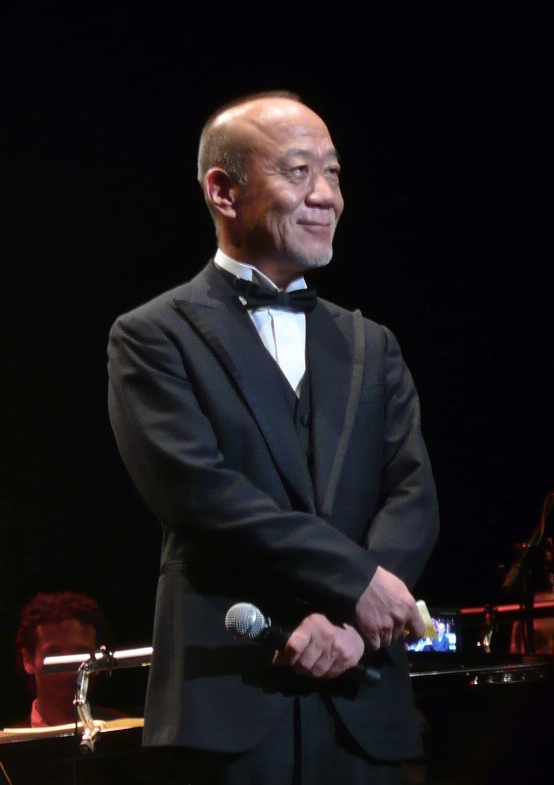
Joe Hisaishi (pictured in 2011), the composer

=== Development ===
Joe Hisaishi, a returning collaborator from Nausicaä, composed Castle in the Sky's score. He was not initially planning to fill this role, as he was occupied with composing for Arion (1986) at the time, but accepted the project at Miyazaki's request. The two went on to become close collaborators, and Hisaishi has since written the music for all of Miyazaki's feature films.

After he was brought on in February 1986, Hisaishi began work on the image album, a collection of demos based on the concept materials that serve as a precursor to the finished score. Takahata acted as music supervisor, and worked with Hisaishi on a plan for the music required in each scene. Each song from the image album was then extended and arranged for full symphony orchestra; this version was recorded by the Tokyo City Philharmonic.

In March, the song "If I Could Fly" (Note: Japanese: もしも空を飛べたら, Hepburn: Moshimo sora o tobetara) was commissioned from Takashi Matsumoto, who had written a similar song for Nausicaä. Unlike the other music, this was not planned to be featured in the film, and only appears in Ajinomoto's television commercials. Kanō described the track, performed by Yōko Obata, as similar to other pop music from the time.

For the final score, Hisaishi aimed to precisely synchronize the music with the on-screen action. Advancements in digital playback allowed him to compose while watching the animation to compare their timing; he then sent the pieces to Miyazaki and Takahata for review. This resulted in lengthy sequences with uninterrupted background score, and pieces that dynamically switch between different motifs to match the scene's point of view. While the image album contains prominent electronic elements, Hisaishi intended for a more "acoustic" sound in the film; the soundtrack version therefore uses Fairlight synthesizers alongside a 50-piece orchestra.

Disagreements between Miyazaki, Takahata, and Hisaishi about which scenes needed background accompaniment led to delays; the music for the opening scene, for example, was written less than a month from the release date. "Carrying You", (Note: Japanese: 君をのせて, Hepburn: Kimi o nosete) the vocal song that plays over the credits sequence, was requested by Takahata late in the production. He asked Miyazaki to write the lyrics – Kanō wrote that they were likely inspired by Wind, Sand and Stars (1939), a memoir by Antoine de Saint-Exupéry – and Hisaishi set them to an arrangement of the film's main theme. It was performed by Azumi Inoue.

According to Shigeharu Shiba, Castle in the Sky was among the first films in Japan to use quadraphonic (4-channel) sound for its theatrical release. He avoided using the additional speakers to move sounds around the room – as Miyazaki felt the effect became too artificial – and instead strove to preserve a "natural sense of space". The final mixing was done at the Tokyo Television Center. Shiba said that Hisaishi's score required very few changes during the process with the exception of the scene of Laputa's collapse, where Takahata insisted the song be cut off in the middle of the scene.

=== Rewriting for the English dub ===
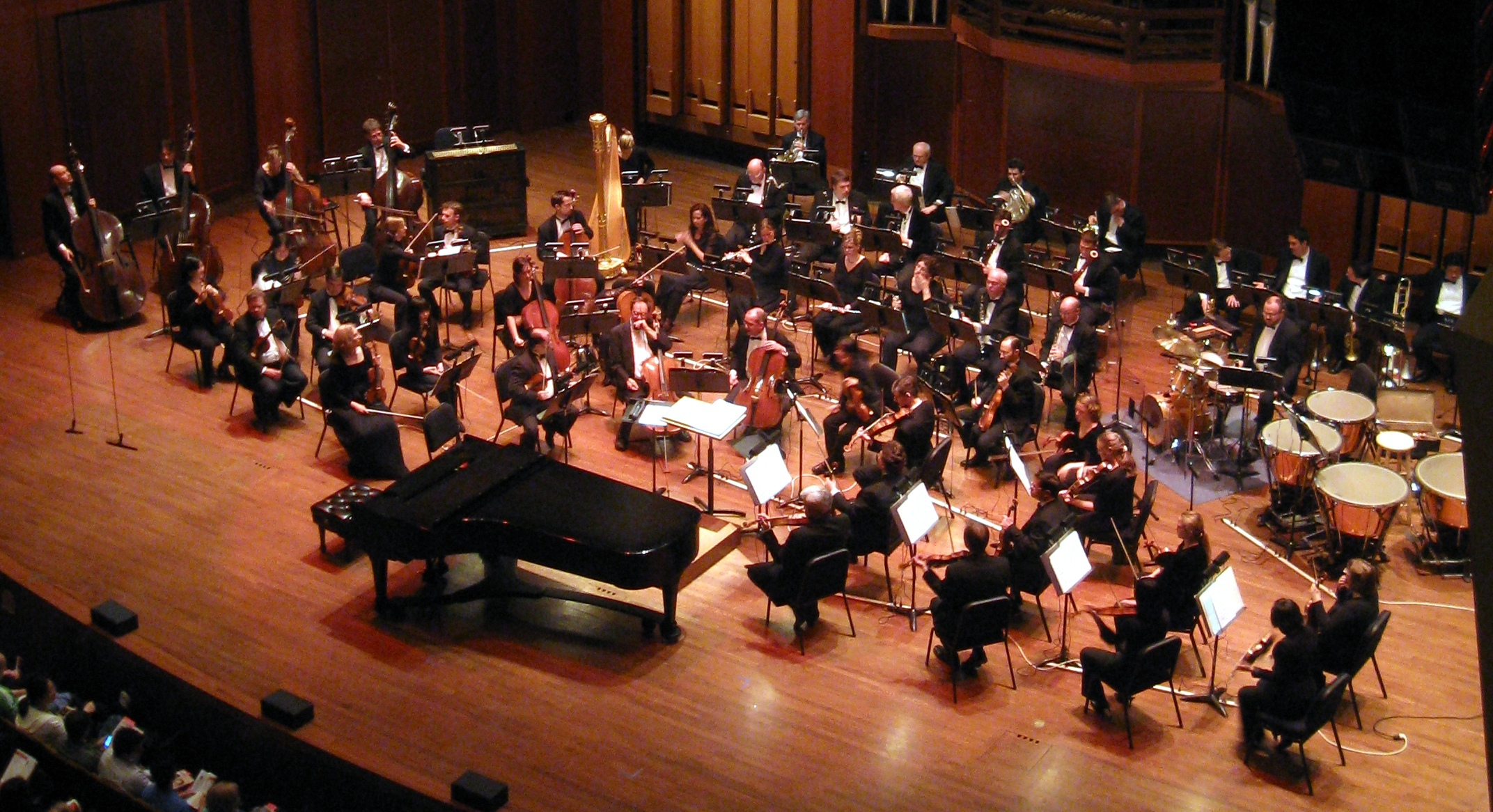
The soundtrack for the 2003 English dub was performed by the Seattle Symphony (pictured in 2009).

Hisaishi began rewriting the soundtrack for the English dub in March 1999, rearranging the original themes in an American cinematic style. He was advised by Disney staff that non-Japanese audiences preferred comparatively more music in films. As a result, this soundtrack is much longer, around 90 minutes in length, while the Japanese version featured just an hour of music.

The new material was used to fill scenes that had previously been silent or partially scored. Various other changes were made, and scenes from the original that Miyazaki or Hisaishi had been dissatisfied with were rewritten entirely. In contrast with the original, he used a "Hollywood method", using pieces to directly represent the characters that appear on screen. Although Hisaishi felt that this writing involved an overly simplistic compositional approach, he stated that he "learned a lot" from the experience.

As many of the original scores and synthesizer data had been lost by this point, Hisaishi reconstructed them before starting on the adaptation. Every piece in this version was written for symphony orchestra, and many electronic-heavy tracks for the original were rearranged for the ensemble. The soundtrack was performed by the Seattle Symphony, which Hisaishi had chosen for their "well-balanced" sound. The recordings took place in Seattle in late April and early May inside a local church.

=== Analysis ===
The cinema and music scholar Marco Bellano identified the image album as the beginning of a change in Hisaishi's compositional style for Miyazaki's films; it contains more experimental pieces, and the melodies are written with much longer phrases. Hisaishi said that these were drawn from Scottish and Irish folk influences, which often use pentatonic scales. Bellano found that, to match the pacing of the film, these melodies are introduced in their complete forms before being "fragmented" when reappearing in later scenes.

Although Hisaishi uses leitmotifs – short, recurring musical elements tied to aspects of the narrative, such as characters or moods – Bellano argued that he developed a novel approach to using leitmotifs due to the particular constraints of composing for a Miyazaki film. Bellano analyzed the film's main theme as built on a descending four-note line (highlighted below in red), a technique that would characterize Hisaishi's future melodies in Miyazaki's work:

In this film's context, he found the descending pattern reflective of the film's theme of flight; rather than escaping into the sky, the film's characters must return to the earth. The pieces underscoring Sheeta's speech to Muska, as well as the introductory scene on Laputa, contain similar descending lines, emphasizing the thematic connection.

Music releases for Castle in the Sky
Release date	English title	Japanese title	Estimated units (Note: Combined sales figures between vinyl records, cassette tapes, and compact discs)
May 25, 1986	Laputa: Castle in the Sky Image Album ~The Girl Who Fell From the Sky~	天空の城ラピュタ イメージアルバム 〜空から降ってきた少女〜	155,000
August 25, 1986	Laputa: Castle in the Sky Soundtrack ~The Mystery of the Levitation Stone~	天空の城ラピュタ サウンドトラック 〜飛行石の謎〜	380,000
August 1986	Laputa: Castle in the Sky Drama Version ~Revive the Light!~	天空の城ラピュタ ドラマ編 〜光よ甦れ!〜	60,000
December 1986	Laputa: Castle in the Sky Symphony Version ~Huge Tree~	天空の城ラピュタ シンフォニー編 〜大樹〜	95,000
1986	"If I Could Fly" (Note: Released as part of an extended play by Yōko Obata)	もしも空を飛べたら	Unknown
March 25, 1988	"Carrying You" (Note: Released as a single by Azumi Inoue)	君をのせて	75,000
November 25, 1989	Laputa: Castle in the Sky Hi-Tech Series	天空の城ラピュタ ハイテックシリーズ	85,000
October 2, 2002	Laputa: Castle in the Sky USA Version Soundtrack	〜天空の城ラピュタ USA ヴァージョンサウンドトラック〜	30,000

== Reception ==
=== Contemporaneous response ===
Compared to Miyazaki's other films, Castle in the Sky received relatively few reviews in the Japanese media. In Animage, several artists were asked to compare the film with Nausicaä; while the majority preferred Castle in the Sky, the writer Baku Yumemakura felt its fantastical world was comparatively less convincing. The screenwriter Taichi Yamada argued that Nausicaä presented a grander sense of scale; the manga artist Rumiko Takahashi echoed this view, but nonetheless expressed her preference for Castle in the Sky, praising the depiction of Sheeta and Pazu's relationship.

In the Asahi Journal, the writer Inuhiko Yomota wrote that the film "presents extremely contemporary issues", praising the depiction of Laputa as a utopia which gradually developed dystopian elements. He also praised the ending, in which Sheeta and Pazu choose to leave the island rather than enact a "second Adam and Eve story". A reviewer for City Road wrote that the film presents themes that were critical of modern society while still maintaining a "warm and caring" view of humanity. In Kinema Junpo, Junichi Tomonari was compelled by Pazu's character development from an ordinary boy to someone who "seizes his own future", a choice he felt would leave a considerable impression on audiences.

Mari Arita of the Weekly Asahi appreciated the film's dynamic action sequences, favorably comparing its flying scenes to those in Peter Pan (1953). She highlighted the details in the animation, as did the film critic Yūkichi Shinada in Kinema Junpo, who also complimented the background art in the first act. He felt, however, that the film did not convincingly blend its Western "fairy tale" influences and Japanese manga-derived elements. The animator Yasuji Mori commended the unique atmosphere of the film, but felt it had a "monotonous" pacing, with the many action set pieces rendering the final sequence anticlimactic.

=== Response to the English dubs ===
On the review aggregator website Metacritic, the film has a weighted average score of 78 out of 100 based on seven critics, indicating "generally favorable" reviews. On Rotten Tomatoes, 96% of the 28 critics' reviews are positive, with an average rating of 7.6 out of 10. The website's critical consensus reads, "With a storytelling palette as rich and brilliant as its animation, Castle in the Sky thrillingly encapsulates Studio Ghibli's unique strengths."

Charles Solomon, writing after the film's 1987 screening in Los Angeles, was highly critical of the film's plot and use of genre clichés. After its London screening, however, a Variety reviewer found the style to be "charming". Upon the film's 1989 theatrical release in the United States, Kanō wrote that it received generally negative reviews in the United States. While multiple reviewers felt that the film's two-hour runtime would turn audiences away – Caryn James of The New York Times commented that it was "liable to strain the patience of adults and the attention spans of children" – others argued that the film had the appeal to keep audiences entertained.

Critics were split over the 1987 English dub; The Cincinnati Post's David Lyman felt the recording had been done "superbly", while Terry Lawson of the Dayton Daily News called it "the film's weakest element". Many critics praised the animation, finding it to be of a high technical caliber. James found the colors to be "dazzling ... jeweled, but subtle". However, others felt the motions lacked fluidity, with Lyman describing it as "stiff-limbed". Reviewers also commended Miyazaki's imagination and world-building. The Washington Post's Richard Harrington appreciated the "moral duality" of Laputa's technology and the film's strong ecological theme.

Commenting on the 2003 home media release, IGN's Jeremy Conrad gave the animation and the reworked soundtrack praise. Sergio Non enjoyed the multifaceted character of Dola, but found the others – particularly Muska – to be simplistic compared to characters in other Miyazaki films. Opinions varied on the 2003 English dub, with The A.V. Club's Tasha Robinson calling the recordings "almost comically bland", and Conrad commending the performances of Anna Paquin and Mark Hamill. The Reno Gazette-Journal's Mark Robinson appreciated the film's "deeply meditative lessons", but found the DVD extras lacking.

Slant's Chuck Bowen, reviewing a later DVD release, held a higher opinion of the extras, and noted the film's minute details, which he wrote give it "texture and originality". IGN's Dan Iverson, however, felt that the video quality was poor, and that the surround sound mixing could be improved. ScreenAnarchy's Ard Vijn reviewed the Blu-ray version, applauding the digitization for its high fidelity. He added that the film's flying sequences were among the best he had ever seen, and TV Guide's Robert Pardi felt it exceeded many American animations in quality.

=== Accolades ===
Accolades received by Castle in the Sky
Award / Publication	Year	Category	Result	Recipient(s)	Ref.
Anime Grand Prix	1987	Best Title	First place	Castle in the Sky	
City Road	Unknown	Readers' Choice, Japanese Films	First place	Castle in the Sky	
Eiga Geijutsu	Unknown	Movie Art	Won	Castle in the Sky	
Kinema Junpo	1986	Best Ten	Eighth place	Castle in the Sky	
Kinema Junpo	1986	Readers' Choice	Runner-up	Castle in the Sky	
Mainichi Film Awards	1986	Ōfuji Noburō Award	Won	Hayao Miyazaki	
Mainichi Film Awards	1986	Ōfuji Noburō Award	Won	Tokuma Shoten	
Osaka Film Festival	Unknown	Best Ten	First place	Castle in the Sky	
Pia Corporation	1986	Pia Ten	First place	Castle in the Sky	

== Legacy ==
=== Retrospective response ===
The film has been acclaimed in retrospective opinions of critics and scholars. According to McCarthy, the film has attained cult status due to its unique blend of themes. Jeff VanderMeer and Selena J. Chambers, in The Steampunk Bible, included the film among the "first modern steampunk classics". Greenberg thought the film was among the greatest in the adventure genre, and Murase named it "quite possibly the most entertaining" in Miyazaki's body of work.

Den of Geek's Ryan Lambie felt that Miyazaki's fantasy, including its "utopian, maybe even impossible vision", was convincingly realized. In The Encyclopedia of Science Fiction, Steven Pearce praised the film as an "exciting adventure tale with imaginative, alluring animation, deserving of its high acclaim". Fumiko Tsuneishi also found the animation to be a strength. Writing for a Kinema Junpo collection on Miyazaki, she compared the film with later entries in Miyazaki's filmography, observing that motifs such as the lead characters' affinity for animals continue to be explored.

Audiences ranked the film third in a poll for the best animated works at the 2006 Japan Media Arts Festival, and named it the best of all time in a 2008 poll by Oricon. In critics' rankings, the film placed 86th on Time Out's list of the 100 best animated films, and 13th on their list of the 30 best anime. It placed 44th on Animage's 100 best anime, and 38th on Paste's.

=== Cultural impact ===
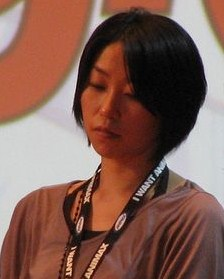
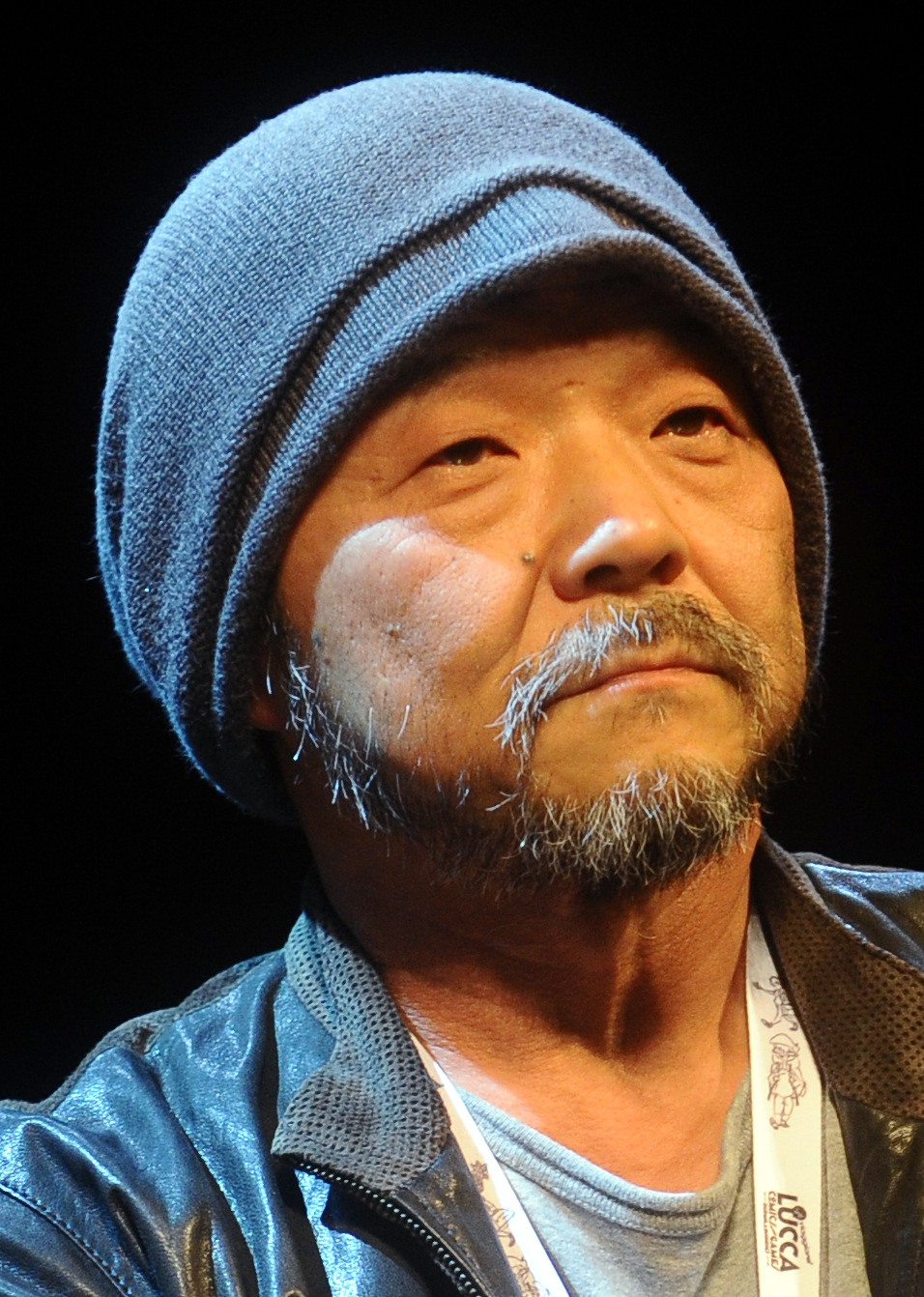
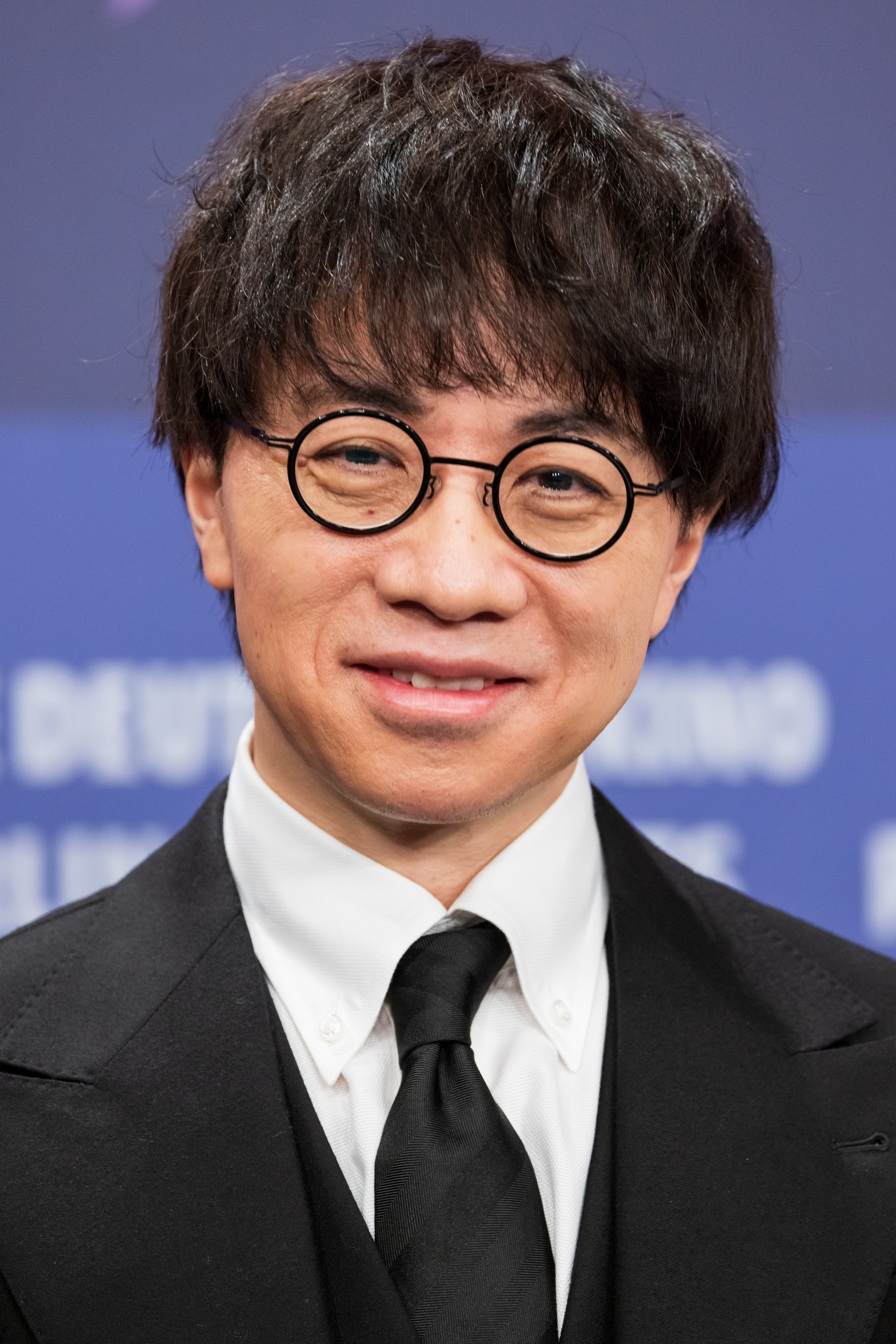
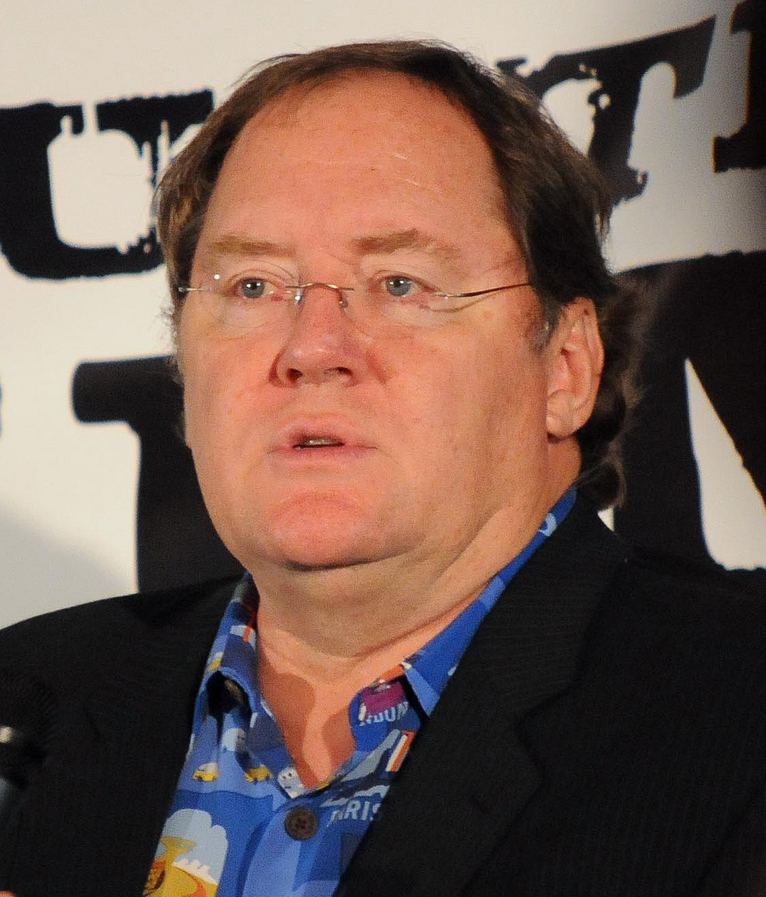
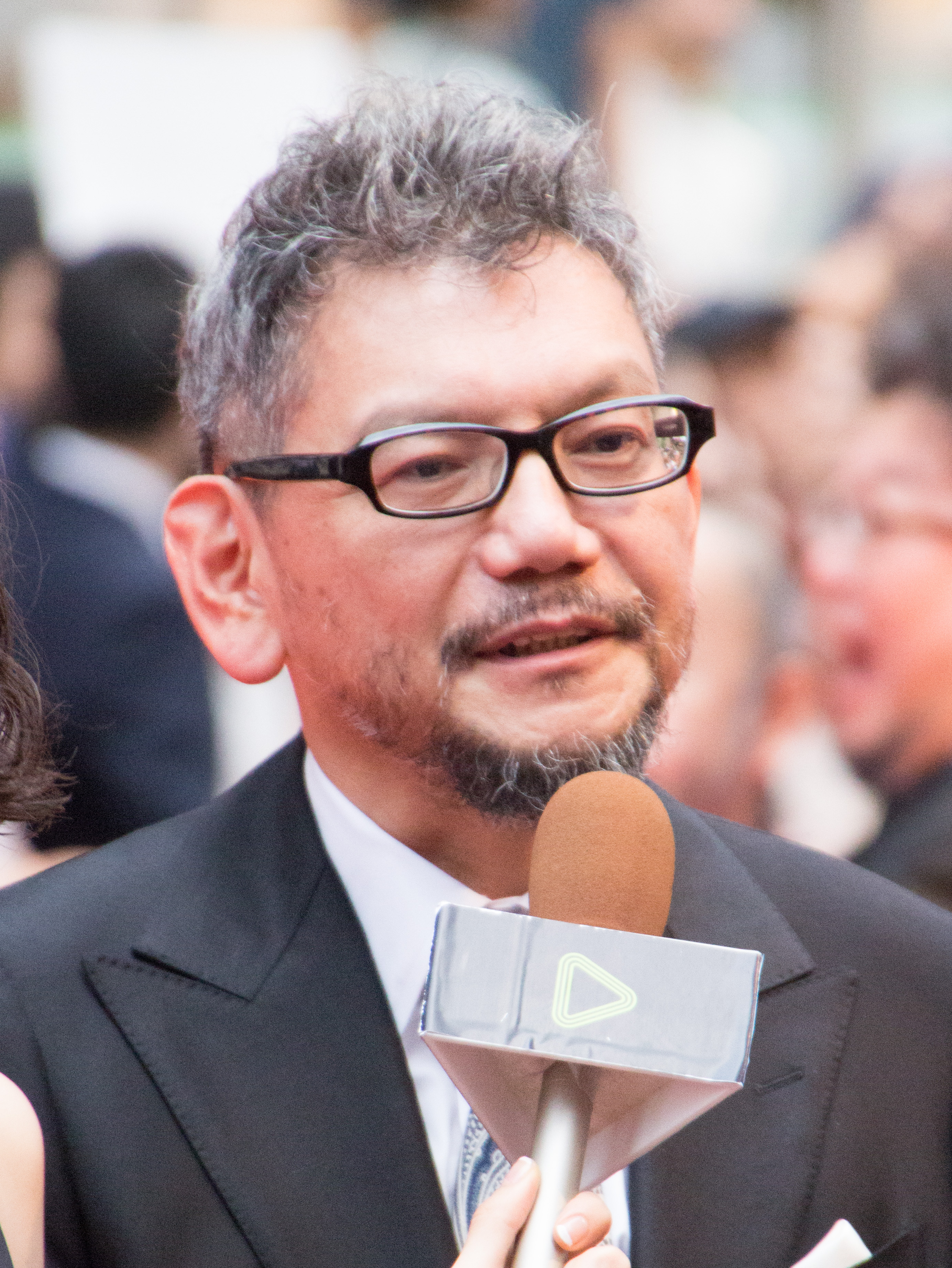
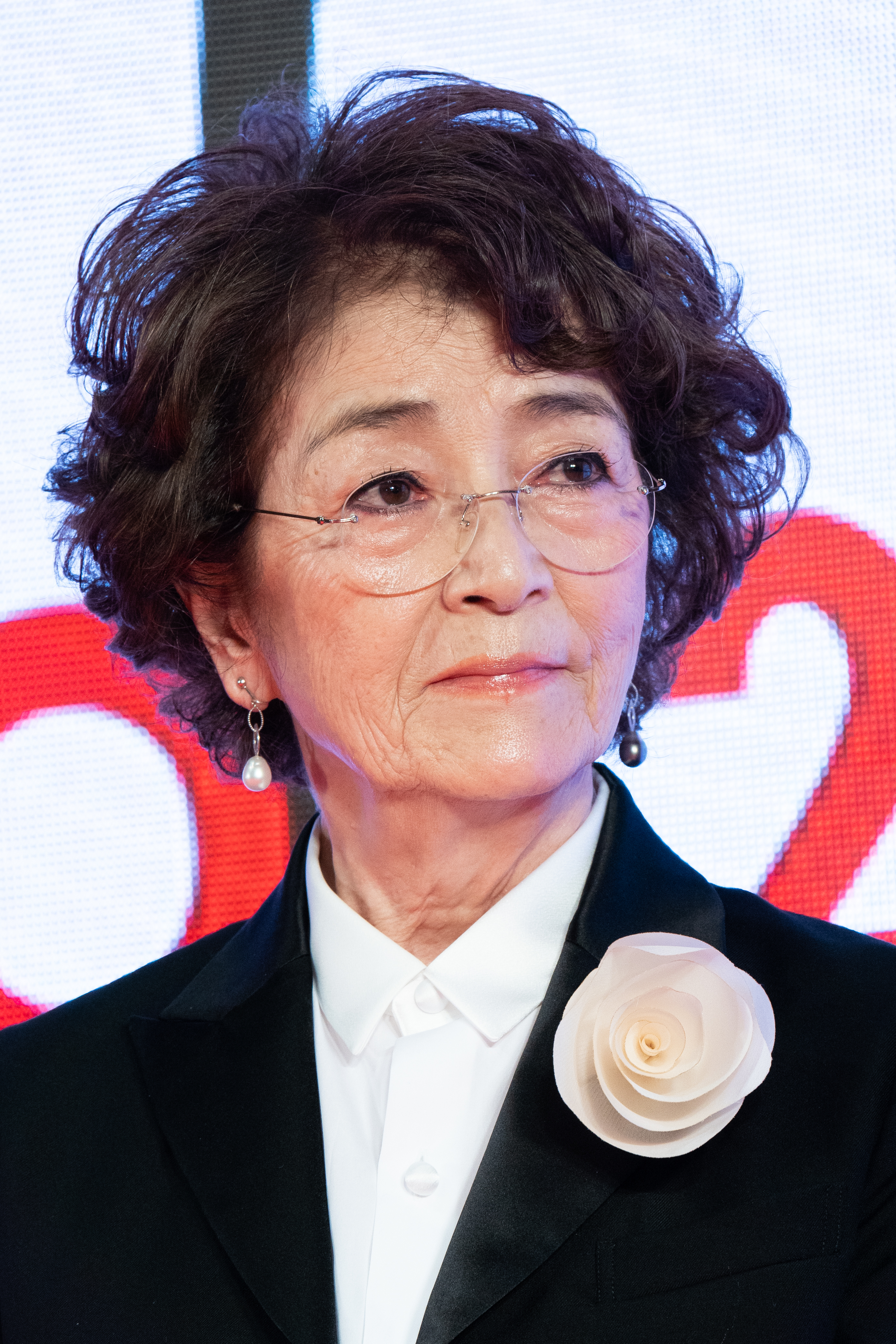
(Clockwise from top left) Katsura Hoshino, Mamoru Oshii, Makoto Shinkai, Chieko Baisho, Hideaki Anno, and John Lasseter

Several artists have cited Castle in the Sky as influencial on their work.

Castle in the Sky has grown into one of Miyazaki's most internationally well-known creations. In Japan, a statue of a robot from the film is displayed at the Ghibli Museum, which also hosted an art piece replicating the film's mine carts in 1992 and a special exhibition of the production materials in 2002. Major artists in the anime and manga industries named the film among their favorites, including Katsura Hoshino, Mamoru Oshii, and Makoto Shinkai. Several of Miyazaki's future collaborators, such as Diana Wynne Jones, Yumi Matsutoya, and Chieko Baisho, developed an appreciation of his work after discovering this film.

Hideaki Anno, who had previously worked with Miyazaki on the production of Nausicaä, based his series Nadia: The Secret of Blue Water (1990–1991) on one of Miyazaki's concepts dating to the 1970s. Substantial similarities, including the orphaned lead characters, the fantastical nineteenth-century setting, and a powerful pendant, are present as a result. John Lasseter, the former chief creative officer at Pixar, often cited Miyazaki and his works as his "greatest inspiration", and named Castle in the Sky among his favorite films. When directing A Bug's Life (1998), he recounted that his teams studied the scene in which Sheeta is rescued from Titus Fort, and owed it a "great debt of gratitude".

Several video games, including Minecraft (2011), have taken inspiration from the film. Critics found stylistic and thematic parallels with titles from The Legend of Zelda series, particularly Tears of the Kingdom (2023). Various films were also influenced, such as WALL-E (2008), The Wild Robot (2024), and A Minecraft Movie (2025). Fans have twice set new records for the highest number of concurrent tweets during television airings of the film; the first was in 2011, which caused a peak of 25,088 tweets per second. The record was surpassed in 2013 with a figure of 143,199 tweets per second.
