= Bōken Dankichi =

Japanese manga series by Keizō Shimada

Bōken Dankichi (冒険ダン吉, Dankichi the Adventurer or The Adventurous Dankichi) is a manga work by Keizō Shimada serialized in Kodansha's boys' magazine Shōnen Club from 1933 to 1939. Strictly speaking, it is in the form of a picture story (emonogatari) with narrative captions attached to the illustrations.

== Overview ==
Dankichi, an adventurous Japanese boy, and his mouse companion Karikō, wash ashore in a South Pacific island after falling asleep in a fishing expedition in the ocean. They find the island is inhabited by natives; Dankichi becomes their king after defeating their leader, bringing "civilized" infrastructures (schools, hospitals, etc.) and customs to the island and defending it from Western invaders. The series quickly become a popular manga, dividing its popularity with Suihō Tagawa's Norakuro, published in the same magazine.

The comic was made in the context of the Japanese Empire expansionist campaign to the South Pacific islands (Micronesia, Palau, Northern Mariana Islands and Marshall Islands). In the post-World War II period, the manga was criticized for glorifying aggressionism and promoting racial prejudice; the island people were depicted as dark-skinned, thick-lipped naive barbarians in contrast to the "civilized" Japanese; they weren't given names, but numbers (number 1, 2, 3) by Dankichi. Besides, the island fauna (lions, elephants, giraffes, etc.) was stereotypically African.

== Serialization ==
- Magazine serialization: "Shonen Club," June 1933-July 1939
- After the war, Kodansha published a collection of all Dankichi's works in 1967. It was also published in four volumes in 1976 as part of Kodansha's "Shonen Club Bunko".
- Book version: A cloth-bound, two-color printed book similar to "Norakuro" was published by Kodansha, the publisher of "Shonen Club". The content was based on the serialized magazine version, with newly drawn panels added and rearranged. The contents were based on the serialized version in the magazine, and were reorganized with the addition of new panels and other illustrations.
- E-books: e-books are available in four volumes from ebookJapan on December 11, 2015, The layout is the same as the first edition, and the horizontal writing is also the same as in those days, right-to-left, but the kana spelling has been replaced with modern kana spelling.

== Adaptations for screen ==
- Bōken Dankichi was adapted to screen in the following animated 8mm short films:
1. Dankichi on a Tropical Island ( 冒険ダン吉 漂流の巻 Bouken Dankichi: Hyouryuu no Maki) (1934)
2. Bōken Dankichi Heavy Artillery Regiment Volume (冒険ダン吉 重砲連隊の巻 Bōken dankichi jūhō rentai no maki)
3. Bōken Dankichi Conquest of Foreigners (冒険ダン吉 外人征伐 Boken Dankichi Gaijin seibatsu)
4. Bōken Dankichi Welcome Baseball Tournament (冒険ダン吉 歓迎野球大会 Bōkendankichi kangei yakyū taikai)
5. Bōken Dankichi Great Tokyo Tour (冒険ダン吉 大東京巡り Bōkendankichi daitōkyō-meguri)
6. Dankichi and Popeye Treasure Island Expedition『冒険ダン吉とポパイ 宝島探険 Bōkendankichi to popai takarajima tanken』
7. Olympic Games on Dankichi Island ( 冒険ダン吉島のオリムピック大會 Dankichi-jima no Olympic Taikai)
- It was made into a puppet play by NHK (Japan Broadcasting Corporation) from October 28, 1959, to December 23 of the same year, and was broadcast on television under the title "Ningyogeki Bokenkichi".
- It was also adapted into a puppet show on Nippon Television from February 1, 1960, to July 30 of the same year and broadcast under the title "Boken Dankichi". It ran for a total of 156 episodes. It was aired Monday-Saturday 18:00-18:15 (JST) as the second program after the drama "Todoroki Sensei," which ran for four and a half years. Puppet production was handled by "Puppet Theatre Company Hitomi-za" of "Hyokkori Hyotanjima" fame. The theme song was written by Koji Shimizu and Yoshiko Kawamukai, sung by the Kamitakada Boys Choir, and released as a single by King Records. The song was provided by Shogakukan and the Ehime Fruit and Vegetable Sales Agricultural Cooperative Association (the parent company of Ehime Beverage), which took turns providing the song for one day. As a side note, NTV broadcast a dramatization of "Tantei Dan-chan" (Detective Dan-chan), also written by Shimada, from December 27, 1958, to June 20, 1959, before this work began.

== See also ==
- South Seas Mandate
- Mori Koben - Japanese businessman regarded as a model for Dankichi. His descendant is Manny Mori, President of the Federated States of Micronesia (2007— 2015).
- Nanshin-ron
