= Cloud robotics =

Robotics using networked computing and shared data resources

Cloud robotics is a field of robotics concerned with the use of cloud computing, cloud storage, and shared network resources in robotic systems. It allows robots to access external computing capacity and exchange information, including maps, object models, software, and learned control policies.

Cloud robotic systems distribute processing between robots and external computers. These may include nearby edge servers and remote data centers, linking the field to distributed computing and fog robotics. The allocation of processing depends on the application's computational requirements, communication delays, energy consumption, and cost.

Research applications include computer vision, simultaneous localization and mapping, motion planning, robotic manipulation, and robot learning. Reliance on remote services also introduces problems involving connectivity, service availability, and the security of communication between robotic components.

== History ==
Cloud robotics developed from research on networked robots, remote computation, and the exchange of information between robotic systems. In 2010, James Kuffner presented Cloud-Enabled Humanoid Robots at a workshop associated with the IEEE-RAS International Conference on Humanoid Robots, discussing the use of networked computing and shared resources in robotics.

Early projects addressed both remote processing and knowledge sharing. DAvinCi, proposed in 2010, investigated the use of Apache Hadoop and MapReduce for service-robot applications. The European Union-funded RoboEarth project, which ran from December 2009 to November 2013, investigated how robots could share knowledge about environments and actions. Its cloud-computing framework, Rapyuta, was presented in 2013.

Subsequent work included cloud-based grasping, cooperative mapping, and knowledge-processing systems. Research in the 2020s has examined the distribution of applications across onboard, edge, and cloud resources, alongside methods for improving reliability and managing large robot-learning datasets.

== Architecture ==
A general edge computing architecture, with intermediate computing nodes between devices and the cloud. Cloud robotic systems can distribute processing across comparable layers.

Cloud robotics encompasses access to shared data, remote computation, collective learning, and human assistance. Shared resources may include images, maps, object descriptions, robot trajectories, and control policies. Remote computing can support statistical analysis and planning, while human input can assist with interpretation and recovery from errors.

=== Onboard, edge, and cloud processing ===
Computation offloading transfers selected processing tasks from a robot to an external computer. The division of work can vary between applications and may change according to the availability of computing and communication resources. In systems containing several robots, resource allocation and scheduling must also account for competing demands on shared infrastructure.

Cloud-based mapping illustrates how an application can be divided into components with different processing requirements. C2TAM separates visual tracking from map optimization, moving the latter to a cloud service. Other research has investigated remote execution of functions within feedback control systems. FogROS2-LS, for example, selects between cloud and edge services for latency-sensitive tasks such as collision avoidance and target tracking.

Edge computing places processing resources closer to robots than a remote data center. Research on fog robotics and edge robotics examines this intermediate layer as a means of supporting applications that require short response times or must accommodate changing network conditions.

=== Middleware and connectivity ===
Robot Operating System 2 (ROS 2) provides a modular framework for developing distributed robotic applications. Its architecture supports communication between software components, configurable quality of service, and security mechanisms. Platforms such as FogROS2 extend this framework to deploy application components on external computing resources.

Connecting components across separate networks presents additional problems of routing, compatibility, and trust management. FogROS2-SGC addresses these through location-independent identifiers and secure communication between systems at different physical locations.

Earlier cloud robotics projects also used ROS 1. Its final supported distribution, ROS Noetic, reached its official end of life on 31 May 2025.

== Applications ==
=== Perception and manipulation ===
A PR2 robot at RoboGames in 2011. The PR2 platform was used in research combining cloud-based object recognition with robotic grasping.

Cloud-based perception systems use remote services to interpret sensor observations. In a 2013 grasping experiment, a PR2 robot used Google's object-recognition service alongside the Point Cloud Library, pose-estimation methods, and grasp-planning software. The study evaluated the combined system's recognition, pose estimation, and grasp execution.

Remote processing has also been applied to grasp planning and motion planning. FogROS2 was evaluated using these tasks and visual SLAM, comparing execution with different computing arrangements. Work on FogROS2-FT subsequently examined perception and planning under network slowdowns and service failures, including a physical scan-and-pick-and-place experiment.

=== Mapping and localization ===
Cloud-based mapping systems allow robots to use remote computation and combine information obtained from more than one platform. C2TAM investigated cooperative tracking and mapping using a cloud-based map-optimization service.

A 2015 study presented an architecture and parallel algorithms for collaborative three-dimensional mapping with low-cost robots. It examined localization accuracy, network use, processing speed, and map storage within the proposed system. Later platforms have included SLAM among the applications used to evaluate cloud and edge execution.

=== Assistive robotics ===
Networked architectures have been investigated for ambient assisted living, including the coordination of robots intended to assist older and disabled people. A 2013 study proposed a ROS-based multi-robot architecture for this purpose, examining how assistive robotic components could operate within a shared system.

=== Remote experimentation and learning ===
Cloud-connected facilities can provide remote access to physical robots for experimentation and data collection. CloudGripper, presented at the 2024 IEEE International Conference on Robotics and Automation, was designed as a testbed with 32 enclosed robot-arm work cells equipped with cameras and grippers. Its evaluation included motion repeatability, network performance, and the collection of robot–rope interaction data.

Cloud services also support the storage and distribution of robot-learning data. Robo-DM, presented in 2025, provides a toolkit for collecting, sharing, and loading datasets containing video, text, and numerical observations. It uses Extensible Binary Meta Language to store these modalities in a common format and applies compression and load-balanced decoding to reduce storage and processing requirements.

== Research systems ==
=== RoboEarth and Rapyuta ===
RoboEarth investigated the exchange of knowledge between robots through a shared repository. Resources included object models, maps, and task descriptions that could be reused by other robotic systems. The project received funding through the European Union's Seventh Framework Programme.

Rapyuta, the RoboEarth Cloud Engine, provided an open-source framework for executing robot software in remote computing environments. These environments could communicate with robots, with one another, and with the RoboEarth repository.

=== Knowledge-processing systems ===
KnowRob combines knowledge representation and reasoning with interfaces to robot perception, internal data structures, and external information sources. It was developed to provide information needed to translate broadly specified tasks into executable actions. Its architecture supports obtaining knowledge on demand rather than requiring every fact to be explicitly stored in advance.

RoboBrain was introduced as a knowledge engine combining robot interactions, Internet knowledge bases, and learned representations. Its researchers examined the integration of different data modalities, uncertainty about the correctness of acquired knowledge, and the expression of robotic tasks as queries. Demonstrated applications included language grounding, perception, and planning.

=== FogROS2 ===
FogROS2 is an open-source platform for deploying ROS 2 application components on cloud and edge resources. It provides mechanisms for remote execution, computing-resource selection, and image-stream compression.

Related systems address different aspects of deployment. FogROS2-SGC connects components across separate networks, while FogROS2-LS selects between services to accommodate latency-sensitive applications. FogROS2-FT introduces replication of independent, stateless services across cloud resources, forwarding the first available response to the robot. Its evaluation considered service outages, network slowdowns, and resource contention.

A 2025 doctoral dissertation on the broader FogROS system brought together work on secure connectivity, latency reliability, cloud-resource configuration, and robot-data management.

== Limitations and challenges ==
=== Performance and reliability ===
Offloading involves a trade-off between the time saved by remote computation and the delay introduced by communication. Energy consumption, execution cost, and competition for shared resources also affect where tasks can be processed effectively. In feedback-controlled applications, excessive or variable latency can affect physical behavior. Research has therefore examined server selection and edge processing as ways to meet application timing requirements.

Service outages and network degradation can interrupt access to remote functions. Replication can mitigate some failures by allowing another service instance to respond, although its effectiveness depends on the application and the failure conditions. FogROS2-FT investigated this approach for perception and planning workloads.

=== Data and interoperability ===
Robot-learning datasets often combine several camera streams with language, sensor measurements, and action sequences. Their size and variety create difficulties in storage, transfer, and retrieval, motivating work on common formats, compression, and efficient data loading.

Knowledge sharing presents a related problem: information must be represented in a form that a robot can use to interpret and execute a task. KnowRob addresses the connection between task descriptions and execution requirements, while RoboBrain examines the integration and reliability of knowledge from multiple sources. At the communication level, separately configured networks and middleware implementations introduce additional interoperability and trust-management requirements.

== Security and privacy ==
Cloud-connected robots are exposed to threats against software, credentials, and network communication. The ROS 2 threat model includes unauthorized access, impersonation of components, and interference with robot operation through malicious messages. It identifies software isolation, protection of cryptographic credentials, restricted permissions, and software-integrity checks as mitigations for particular scenarios.

For ROS 2 systems using Data Distribution Service (DDS), the DDS Security integration provides mechanisms for authentication, access control, and encrypted communication. Authentication establishes participant identities, while permissions govern which operations those participants may perform. Access-control policies can restrict which participants publish or receive particular communication topics.

These mechanisms depend on configuration and credential management. Encryption protects supported communications, but threats such as compromised software or stolen participant credentials require additional safeguards.

== See also ==
- Distributed artificial intelligence
- Edge computing
- Fog computing
- Fog robotics
- Internet of things
- Multi-agent system
- Robot learning
- Robot Operating System
- Swarm robotics
- Teleoperation
