= Mohanarajah Gajamohan =

Sri Lankan robot scientist (born 1980)

Mohanarajah Gajamohan (born 1980, Sri Lanka) is a Swiss-based Sri Lankan robot scientist. Gajamohan has made significant contributions to cloud robotics by being the chief developer of Rapyuta robot database. His other notable project being Cubli self-balancing cube.
