= People of the Desert =

Japanese graphic novel

- Sabaku no Tami cover

砂漠の民 (Sabaku no Tami)
- Genre: Adventure
- Manga
- Written by: Hayao Miyazaki (as Akitsu Saburō)
- Magazine: Boys' and Girls' Newspaper
- Original run: September 12, 1969 – March 15, 1970

People of the Desert (Note: Japanese: 砂漠の民, Hepburn: Sabaku no Tami; translated on the cover as The People of Desert; also known as The Desert Tribe) is a Japanese illustrated story (emonogatari) written and illustrated by Hayao Miyazaki, under the pseudonym Akitsu Saburō. (Note: Japanese: 秋津三朗) It was serialized and published in the Boys' and Girls' Newspaper (Note: Japanese: 少年少女新聞, Hepburn: Shōnen Shōjo Shinbun) from September 12, 1969, to March 15, 1970. The story follows Tem, a shepherd boy from the Sokut tribe, as he becomes involved in a conflict with the nomadic Kittāru tribe.

People of the Desert was Miyazaki's first original manga and was influenced by illustrated stories he read during his childhood. The manga has been identified as a precursor to themes and narrative elements developed in his later works, including Nausicaä of the Valley of the Wind (1982–1994) and Shuna's Journey (1983).

== Plot ==
The story is set in the distant past, on the fictionalised desert plains of Central Asia. Part of the story takes place in the fortified city named Pejite. (Note: Japanese: ペジテ)

The story follows the exploits of the main character and protagonist, Tem, (Note: Japanese: テム, Hepburn: Temu) a shepherd boy of the fictional Sokut (Note: Japanese: ソクート, Hepburn: Sokūto) tribe. He becomes the target of the mounted forces of the nomadic Kittāru (Note: Japanese: キッタール) tribe, which seeks to establish control of the Sokut territory. As the conflict escalates, Tem attempts to escape the opposing forces and organize resistance among his remaining compatriots and rebels.

The story centers on the struggle against the Kittāru tribe's military campaign and its attempt to subjugate the Sokut population. Tem's actions become part of a broader attempt to restore peace to the region and resist the occupation of his people's territories.

== Publication ==
People of the Desert was serialized in the Boys' and Girls' Newspaper, a publication of the Japanese Communist Party. The story ran from September 12, 1969, to March 15, 1970, and consisted of 26 installments, issues 28 to 53. Miyazaki published the story under the pseudonym Akitsu Saburō.

== Influences ==
Miyazaki drew inspiration from the emonogatari tradition, which combined written narratives with illustrations. He was also influenced by adventure stories he had read as a child, including Shōnen Ōja (Note: Japanese: 少年王者) by Sōji Yamakawa and Demon King of the Desert (Note: Japanese: 沙漠の魔王, Hepburn: Sabaku no Maō) by Tetsuji Fukushima.

The story's setting reflects Miyazaki's interest in Central Asia and the Silk Road. Elements in People of the Desert can be compared to ideas and settings Miyazaki later developed in works such as Nausicaä of the Valley of the Wind (1982–1994) and Shuna's Journey (1983). These works share similarities in their depictions of distant lands, fictional societies, and conflicts between communities.
