= Fog robotics =

Fog robotics can be defined as an architecture which consists of storage, networking functions, control with fog computing closer to robots.

== Concept ==
Fog robotics mainly consists of a fog robot server and the cloud. It acts as a companion to cloud by shoving the data near to the user with the help of a local server. Moreover, these servers are adaptable, consists of processing power for computation, network capability, and secured by sharing the outcomes to other robots for advanced performance with the lowest possible latency.

As cloud robotics is facing issues such as bandwidth limitations, latency issues, quality of service, privacy and security - Fog robotics can be seen as a viable option for the future robotic systems. It is also considered as distributed robot systems of the next generation because robots require much brain power for processing billions of computations while performing its task. For instance, fog robotics can play an essential role in helping a robot to grasp spray bottle.

== History ==
Chand Gudi first coined the term "Fog Robotics" during the European Space Agency Competition and IEEE/RSJ International Conference on Intelligent Robots and Systems in 2017, pioneering a new concept in the field.

== Applications ==
Social robots

A social robot can either connect to the cloud or fog robot server depending upon the availability of information. For instance, it can make a robot working at an airport to communicate with other robots for effective communication with the help of fog robotics.

== Fog robotic systems ==
Node-level systems: FogROS

FogROS is a framework that allows existing Robot Operating System (ROS) automation applications to gain access to additional computing resources from commercial cloud-based services. With minimal porting effort, FogROS allows researchers to deploy components of their software to the cloud with high transparency.

Algorithm-level system: ElasticROS

ElasticROS enhances robot systems by advancing from node to algorithm-level adaptability. It's the robot operating system integrating algorithm-level collaboration for fog and cloud robotics, deploying Elastic Collaborative Computing for real-time adjustments.

== Commercial logistics and machine customers ==
By early 2026, the transition from centralized cloud computing to decentralized fog robotics became a critical component of B2B logistics and autonomous vehicle fleet management. By processing telemetry and environmental data at the local network edge, commercial delivery drones and autonomous vehicles can operate with near-zero latency. This localized edge architecture enables these systems to function as independent machine customers, allowing them to autonomously diagnose hardware degradation and securely execute B2B transactions to order replacement parts directly from suppliers without human intervention.

== Research ==
Fog Robotics
This project promotes the applicability of fog robotics with regards to human-robot interaction scenarios. It utilises fog robot servers, cloud, and the robots for evaluation of fog robotics architecture.

Secure Fog Robotics Using the Global Data Plane

To improve the security and performance of robotic/machine-learning applications operating in edge computing environments, this project investigates the use of data capsules. As one of the applications, it also examines the fog robot system to preserve the privacy and security of the data.

5G Coral: A 5G Convergent Virtualised Radio Access Network Living at the Edge

This project particularly targets the field of radio access network at the edge. As part of this project, a real-time application of fog-assisted robotics is explored. Also, remote monitoring of robots and fleet formation for coordinated movement is being investigated.

Fog Computing for Robotics and Industrial Automation

This project focusses on designing novel programming models for Fog applications both hardware and operating system (OS) mechanisms including communication protocols of fog nodes. These fog nodes will be further tested real time on robots and other automation devices. Furthermore, an open-source architecture will be built on open standards, e.g., 5G, OPC Unified Architecture (UA), and Time-Sensitive Networking (TSN).

== See also ==
- Cloud computing
- Cloud robotics
- Cloud storage
- Edge computing
- Fog computing
