= Emonogatari =

Japanese picture book format

Emonogatari (絵物語; picture story) is the Japanese term for a narrative story that contains a very high proportion of illustrations. Alternatively, it is a picture book with a larger amount of text or a manga where the pictures and text have been separated. The boundaries between these genres are extremely vague, and it is not uncommon for the same work to change from an emonogatari to a manga, or vice versa, during its serialization.

The term emonogatari can be seen in works such as Ippei Okamoto's Chinsuke Emonogatari (Ryoyu, 1917) and Manga Emonogatari (Collection of Elementary School Students, Bungeishunju, 1929). However, during the war, there were also examples of the use of emonogatari instead of manga to improve the impression made by censors. It was especially popular around and after the time of World War II. In most cases, the illustrations and text are both written by the same artist, and some works even have speech bubbles in the illustrations, so the work is sometimes considered a type of manga.

Its origins date back to an editor at the magazine Shōnen Club who proposed a form of reading material called a "magazine kamishibai", to kamishibai writer Sōji Yamakawa, and Yamakawa wrote the rough outline of the story as a kamishibai to be read by oneself. The first clearly identifiable work dates from the 1930s ("Shonen Club" magazine, July 1939 issue, Senbu no yuchi (宣撫の勇士;"The Warrior of Pacification").

The magazine Manga Shōnen, published between 1947 and 1955, played a pivotal role in the development and popularization of emonogatari. While the magazine upheld the moral and literary values of prewar children's publications, it also embraced this new hybrid form as a way to engage postwar youth with emotionally resonant, visually dynamic storytelling. Among the most influential contributors was Sōji Yamakawa, whose serialized works such as Silver Star (1948–49) and Knockout Q (1949–51) brought cinematic pacing and narrative ambition to the page. These stories were widely popular and commercially successful, with Yamakawa briefly surpassing even Osamu Tezuka in income and recognition.

Emonogatari writers are often also kamishibai artists, illustrators, animators and manga artists. Representative authors include Sōji Yamakawa and Shigeru Komatsuzaki. Osamu Tezuka, who created the foundations of Japanese manga expression, and anime creator Hayao Miyazaki also left behind works in the form of emonogatari. Although the golden age of emonogatari was a short period in the 1950s and 60s, it is said to have influenced the "gekiga" (dramatic comics) that appeared in the 1960s and 70s.

== Major artists and works ==
- Tetsuji Fukushima – Sabaku no Maoh (沙漠の魔王; Devil King of the Desert)
- Takeo Nagamatsu – Golden Bat
- Sōji Yamakawa – Shonen Kenya (少年ケニヤ, Kenya Boy), Shonen Ōja (少年王者; Boy Champion)
- Shigeru Komatsuzaki – Chikyū SOS (地球SOS; SOS Earth) and Taihei Genji (大平原児;The Great Plains Child)
- Shichima Sakai – Kurama Kotengu (鞍馬小天狗)
- Motoichiro Takebe – Shonen Tarzan (少年ターザン)
- Hikozo Ito – Asura Tengu (阿修羅天狗)
- Keizō Shimada – Bōken Dankichi
- Tatsuo Yoshida – Shonen Puroresu Ō Tetsuwan Rikiya (少年プリキヤ;Young Pro Wrestling King: Iron Arm Rikiya) (illustration)
- Tomohiko Oka – Byakko Kamen (白虎仮面; White Tiger Mask)
- Ueki Kin'ya – The Secrets of Fuun Kurama (Fuun Kurama hijō; 風雲鞍馬秘帖)
- Ikki Kajiwara – Shonen Puroresu Ō Tetsuwan Rikiya"(uncredited original author), New Battleship Yamato (Shinsenkan Yamato; 新戦艦大和 (original author)
- Osamu Tezuka – Hato yo Ten made (ハトよ天まで; Pigeons to the Sky )
- Hayao Miyazaki – Shuna's Journey
