= Rapyuta =

Rapyuta is the online database for the RoboEarth Cloud Engine which is a platform as a service (PaaS). The database, which is part of the European RoboEarth Project, is used as an open-source tool for developers creating robotic applications in the cloud platform. It is designed to allow robots to query the database to learn about their environment, build, as well as providing guidance systems. Rapyuta project lead was Mohanarajah Gajamohan.

== Background ==
The name Rapyuta is derived from the Hayao Miyazaki's anime, Castle in the Sky. In the film, there is a place called Rapyuta, which was inspired by Jonathan Swift's island of Laputa, where all robots live. The stated purpose of the project is

[T]he goal of RoboEarth is to allow robotic systems to benefit from the experience of other robots, paving the way for rapid advances in machine cognition and behavior, and ultimately, for more subtle and sophisticated human-machine interaction.

In simple terms, Rapyuta is considered an online brain that describes unfamiliar objects to robots. Aside from helping users send their application to the cloud for processing, Rapyuta also enables robots to search for data (draw from the "experience" of other robots) that can help it perform its tasks. It uses a combination of ROS and WebSocket communication protocols so that the computing environment can be employed in three types of cases: private cloud, where the robots belong to a single entity; software-as-a-service, where multiple robots access ROS software applications run by Rapyuta; and, platform-as-a-service, where Rapyuta serves as a host to the developers' applications or a platform where they can be shared.
