= Shuna's Journey =

Japanese graphic novel

- Cover of the graphic novel

シュナの旅 (Shuna no Tabi)
- Genre: Adventure
- Manga
- Written by: Hayao Miyazaki
- Published by: Tokuma Shoten
- English publisher: US: First Second Books
- Imprint: Animage Ju Ju Bunko
- Published: 15 June 1983

Shuna's Journey (シュナの旅, Shuna no Tabi) is a one-volume watercolor-illustrated emonogatari (graphic novel) written and illustrated by Hayao Miyazaki and published as a single bunkoban (softcover booklet), on 15 June 1983, by Tokuma Shoten under its Animage Ju Ju Bunko imprint. The story was adapted into a 60-minute radio drama which was broadcast in Japan, on NHK FM, on 2 May 1987. In February 2022, First Second Books announced that it licensed the title, and an English-language edition, translated by Alex Dudok de Wit, was released in the United States on November 1, 2022.

== Story ==
The story opens with Shuna, the prince of a small mountain valley undergoing famine. One day, an old dying traveler arrives carrying a bag of dead golden seeds. Before dying, he tells Shuna how he was once a young prince in a similar position to him and how he began his quest for the living grain after encountering the previous owner of the seeds. The magnificent golden grain is said to have originated from a land in the west where the moon resides. He also explains that the grain can save his people from starvation. Shuna leaves, journeying to the west over harsh landscapes astride his elk-like mount, Yakkul.

After countless months of traveling, he has a near fatal encounter with a group of female cannibals known as the Goor Tribe. After successfully driving them off, he encounters several abandoned villages and arrives at place known as "castle-town". It is a deteriorating city inhabited by slavers known as "man-hunters" who prey on those who are defenseless and barter using slaves or loot from raided villages. There he finds the golden seed but discovers that it has already been threshed and is therefore not viable. While there, he meets an enslaved girl named Thea and her sister. While he considers buying their freedom, he is turned back by the merchants. Later that night, he meets an old traveler who explains that the seeds come from a land further west that is the home of the moon and where the mythical beings known as god-men grow the grain and trade it to the man-hunters for fresh slaves. However, before falling asleep, he warns Shuna that no man had ever gone there and returned alive. When morning comes, the old man disappears and Shuna rescues Thea and her sister from the slave-traders. After being pursued for two nights, they come to a cliff and Thea and her sister part ways with Shuna, taking Yakkul with them. Before departing, Thea learns of his plans and tells him to find them in the north if he survives. After defeating the pursuers with a trap, Shuna sees the moon sweep across the sky and knows that it is heading over the cliff in the direction of the land of the god-men. He descends the cliff, at the bottom of which is a turbulent ocean. Shuna sinks into a sleep of exhaustion, and upon awakening, sees that the ocean has calmed and a sandbar has appeared connecting the beach to the land of the god-men.

Crossing the sandbar, Shuna finds himself in a paradise full of extinct plant and animal species, along with strange and passive moss-like giants. In the center of an irrigated clearing, he discovers a bizarre and eerie tower that appears to be alive, and watches as the moon settles down on the tower and empties bodies of dead slaves into it during the night. In the morning, the tower creates new giants and irrigates the field while the green giants plant golden kernels of grain, which grow throughout the day into maturity. After realizing that time is accelerated on the island upon seeing his rifle, sword, and clothing deteriorate before his very eyes, Shuna takes some of the golden grain heads; causing great pain to himself and the giants in the process. He is then pursued by howling giants as he runs to the cliff overlooking the sea and jumps in, in order to escape.

Meanwhile, the narrative cuts to Thea and her sister one year later. After fleeing the man-hunters, they had settled in as tenant farmers for an old woman in a remote northern village. One evening, Thea imagines that she hears Shuna's voice calling out to her, and finds him on the outskirts of the village. While he has the golden wheat in a pouch, he was mentally broken from his escape from the island. As a result, he was reduced to a traumatic state and lost his speech and memory. After Thea nurses Shuna back to health, together they plant the golden grain and begin to harvest it. At the same time, Shuna slowly recovers his voice and memories; much to the sisters' joy and relief. By this time, Thea has come of age and the old woman, eager to find another field hand, urges her to either marry or face eviction. Instead of choosing suitors from the village, Thea marries Shuna and they live together in the village for another year while harvesting the golden wheat and helping the villagers fend off raids from man-hunters. But finally Thea, her sister, Shuna, and Yakkul decide to return with half of the harvested grain to plant in Shuna's valley and end the famine.

== Characters ==
- Shuna (シュナ): A young adolescent prince of a small valley who sets out to find the golden grain in the land of the god-men. Helen McCarthy writes that he is considered to be prototypical to the character of Nausicaä and has obvious links to the Ashitaka character in Princess Mononoke.
- Yakkul (ヤックル, Yakkuru): Shuna's mount (here, Yakkul refers to the breed as well as the individual, which looks like a light brown sable antelope without a mane and with a white underbelly). He is the source of inspiration and the namesake of Ashitaka's mount in Princess Mononoke.
- Thea (テア, Tea): An adolescent girl enslaved by the people in the "castle-town" whom Shuna frees; she later finds Shuna after his journey to the land of the god-men and helps him plant the golden wheat.
- Thea's sister: A very young girl freed along with Thea by Shuna.

== Inspirations ==
In his afterword published in the Shuna booklet, Hayao Miyazaki wrote that he took the Tibetan folktale, "The Prince Who Turned into a Dog", as a source of inspiration for the novel. It is a myth of how a prince named Prince Achu saved his people by stealing barley from the west from a serpent king. He was punished by being turned into a dog but returned to human form due to the love of a young girl and returns with the grain to his people. Miyazaki wrote that while he wanted to create an animation for it at the time, no one was willing to animate such a simple story. As a result, he turned it into a graphic novel with the support of several publishers.

Kentaro Takekuma traces Miyazaki's stylistic inspirations back to the adventures he read as a child and identifies his 1969 illustrated story People of the Desert as a precursor for Shuna's Journey.

== Awards ==
Shuna's Journey won Eisner Awards 2023 Best U.S. Edition of International Material—Asia award. It was nominated in the Best Manga category at the Harvey Awards in the same year.

== Radio drama adaptation ==
The story was adapted into a 60-minute radio drama which was broadcast in Japan, on NHK FM, on 2 May 1987. Yōji Matsuda voiced the titular role.

== Legacy ==
Shuna's Journey partially inspired the 2006 anime film Tales from Earthsea, directed by Hayao's son Goro.
