= Shōnen Club =

Japanese boys' magazine

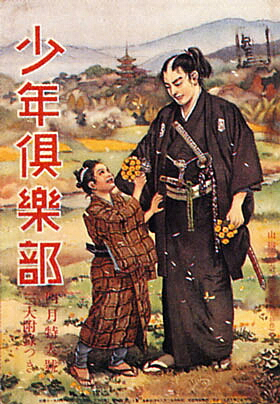
- Cover for April 1929
- Categories: Boys' magazine, children's magazine
- Publisher: Kodansha
- Founded: 1914; 112 years ago
- Final issue: 1962; 64 years ago
- Country: Japan
- Language: Japanese

Shōnen Club (Japanese: 少年倶楽部, Hepburn: Shōnen Kurabu; later renamed 少年クラブ in 1946) was a monthly boys' magazine published by Kodansha in November 1914. The magazine initially featured articles, poetry and serialized novels, but it began to focus more on creating manga content by the 1930s. The first manga, Norakuro, was published in the magazine in 1931. The magazine's success lead to the sister publication of Shōjo Club in 1923, which offered similar content, but catered toward girls.

== Notable works ==
=== Novel serialization ===
Publication	Author	Title
Jan 1936 to Nov 1936	Ranpo Edogawa	The Fiend with Twenty Faces (怪人二十面相, Kaijin Nijū Mensō)
Jan 1937 to (date unknown)	Ranpo Edogawa	Shōnen Tanteidan (少年探偵団)

=== Manga serialization ===
Publication	Artist	Title
Jan 1936 - Nov 1936	Suihō Tagawa	Norakuro (のらくろ)
Jun 1933 - Jul 1939	Keizō Shimada	Bōken Dankichi (冒険ダン吉)
May 1958 - Dec 1960	Jiro Kuwata	Moonlight Mask (月光仮面, Gekkō kamen) - script by Kōhan Kawauchi
May 1961 - Dec 1962	Osamu Tezuka	Fushigi na shōnen (ふしぎな少年)
1961 (unknown months)	Jiro Kuwata	Garoro Q (ガロロQ)

== See also ==
- List of manga magazines
- Shōjo Club
