= Norakuro =

Japanese media franchise

- Manga volume 1 cover (1975 bunkoban edition)

のらくろ
- Manga
- Written by: Suihō Tagawa
- Published by: Kodansha
- Magazine: Shōnen Kurabu
- English magazine: US: Kramer's Ergot
- Original run: 1931 – 1981
- Volumes: 36
- Anime television series
- Directed by: Toru Murayama
- Music by: Hidehiko Arashino
- Studio: TCJ
- Original network: FNS (Fuji TV)
- Original run: 5 October 1970 – 29 March 1971
- Episodes: 26
- Anime television series

Norakuro-kun
- Directed by: Masami Anno
- Studio: Pierrot
- Original network: FNS (Fuji TV)
- Original run: 4 October 1987 – 2 October 1988
- Episodes: 50

Norakuro (Japanese: のらくろ) is a Japanese manga series created by Suihō Tagawa, originally published by Kodansha in Shōnen Kurabu, and one of the first series' to be reprinted in tankōbon format. The titular protagonist, Norakuro, or Norakuro-kun, is an anthropomorphic black and white dog inspired by Felix the Cat. The name Norakuro is an abbreviation of norainu (野良犬; stray dog) and Kurokichi (黒吉; the name of the dog, literally meaning "black luck").

== Media ==
=== Manga ===
English version of a 1937 Norakuro strip as published in the sixth Kramer's Ergot comics anthology.

In the original story, the central character Norakuro was a soldier serving in an army of dogs called the "fierce dogs regiment" (猛犬連隊, mōken-rentai). The strip's publication began in Kodansha's Shōnen Kurabu in 1931, and was based on the Imperial Japanese Army of the time; the manga artist, Suihō Tagawa, had served in the Imperial Army from 1919 to 1922. Norakuro was gradually promoted from private to captain in the stories, which began as humorous episodes, but eventually developed into propaganda tales of military exploits against the "pigs army" on the "continent" - a thinly veiled reference to the Second Sino-Japanese War. The series became a hit in Japan; Shonen Kurabu's circulation was of 750.000 in 1936, and several Norakuro-themed merchandise (toys, stationery and other products - licensed or not) were sold. Kimihiko Nakamura argues that "Norakuro connected children with the war and became a representative of wartime children's culture as an unofficial propaganda hero."

Serialization of Norakuro stopped in 1941 for wartime austerity reasons. After the war, due to the popularity of the strip, the character returned in various guises, including a sumo wrestler and a botanist.

There is an excerpt that appears in the sixth Kramer's Ergot comics anthology which is the only example of Tagawa's work published in English.

=== Short films ===
At least seven extant animated short films featuring Norakuro were made from June 1933 to 1939.

English title	Japanese title	Release date	Directed by	Written by	Studio	Runtime
Private 2nd Class Norakuro: The Training	のらくろ二等兵 演習の巻	14 June 1933	Yasuji Murata	Chuzo Aochi & Suihō Tagawa	Yokohama Cinema Company	1 film reel (Note: One film strip was used for these two short films featuring "Private 2nd Class Norakuro".)
Private 2nd Class Nora-kuro: The Drill	のらくろ二等兵 教練の巻	14 June 1933	Yasuji Murata	Chuzo Aochi & Suihō Tagawa	Yokohama Cinema Company	1 film reel
Corporal Nora-Kuro	のらくろ伍長	9 March 1934	Yasuji Murata	Chuzo Aochi & Suihō Tagawa	Yokohama Cinema Company	11 minutes
Private 1st Class Nora-Kuro	のらくろ一等兵	1935	Mitsuyo Seo	Suihō Tagawa	Seo Talkie Manga Labs	1 film reel
Private 2nd Class Nora-Kuro	のらくろ二等兵	1935	Mitsuyo Seo	Suihō Tagawa	Seo Talkie Manga Labs	2 film reels
Nora-Kuro's Tiger Hunt	のらくろ虎退治	1938	Mitsuyo Seo	Suihō Tagawa	Geijutsu Eiga Sha	10 minutes
Norakuro The Sergeant: The Air Ride	のらくろ軍曹 空襲の巻	c.1939	Mitsuyo Seo	Suihō Tagawa	Geijutsu Eiga Sha	52 seconds (Surviving print)

=== Anime series ===
Two post-war animated series of Norakuro, in 1970 and 1987, have also been produced. In the 1970 series, the voice of Norakuro was played by Nobuyo Ōyama, also known as the voice of Doraemon. During the 1980s and early 1990s, Norakuro was the mascot of the Physical Training School (Tai-Iku Gakko) of the Japan Self-Defense Forces.

== See also ==
- List of anime by release date (pre-1939)
- Momotaro: Sacred Sailors
