= Seiji Kanō =

Japanese animation scholar

Seiji Kanō (Japanese: 叶精二, Hepburn: Kanō Seiji) is a Japanese animation scholar and critic.

== Biography ==
An admirer of the films created by Isao Takahata and Hayao Miyazaki, Kanō published fanzines discussing their works in the 1980s. By the 1990s, he was writing and researching for magazine articles related to animation. Kanō published the reference work The Complete Hayao Miyazaki in 2006. The book draws from interviews with Studio Ghibli staff members and covers 18 of Miyazaki's feature-length and short films, including aspects of their productions, inspirations, and animation techniques. Emiko Okada, in a review for Kinema Junpo, wrote that the work was thoroughly researched and appreciated the absence of otaku-like commentary. The book was also reviewed in the Shūkan Bunshun and Studio Voice magazines. Kanō has worked as a lecturer at several academic institutions, including Asia University and the Joshibi University of Art and Design. He is also a specially appointed professor at the Tokyo Zokei University within its animation faculty. Kanō serves as the director of the Institute of Isao Takahata and Hayao Miyazaki Films.

== Selected works ==
- ——— (2006). 宮崎駿全書 [The Complete Hayao Miyazaki] (in Japanese). Film Art. ISBN 978-4-8459-0687-1.
- ———, ed. (2023). 道楽もの雑記帖 (in Japanese). Coivos. ISBN 978-4-7683-1775-4.
