= Suihō Tagawa =

Japanese manga artist (1899–1989)

Nakatarō Takamizawa (高見澤 仲太郎, Takamizawa Nakatarō; February 10, 1899 – December 12, 1989), better known by the pen name Suihō Tagawa (田河 水泡, Tagawa Suihō), was a Japanese manga artist.

== Biography ==
Born in Sumida, Tokyo, Nakatarō Takamizawa grew up an orphan: his mother died upon his birth, his father and his uncle (who served as one of his stepparents) both died several years afterwards. He graduated from Fukagawa's municipal Rinkai Jinjō elementary school in 1911. In 1919, he was conscripted into the Imperial Japanese Army, serving in Korea and Manchuria, and left in 1922. In 1925, he graduated from Nihon Bijutsu Gakkō ("Japan School of Art"); during his time at the school, he participated in the radical avant-garde movement Mavo, under the pen name Takamizawa Michinao (高見沢 路直).

In 1926, he became a rakugo author. He began producing manga in 1927. He gained a regular assignment selling manga stories and adopted the pen name Takamizuawa (田河水泡), which was later corrupted into Suihō Tagawa (田河 水泡, Tagawa Suihō): Mizuawa/Suihō (水泡) literally means "water bubble". In 1928 he married Junko (潤子) (younger sister of Hideo Kobayashi) in a church ceremony.

In 1931, he began the long-running series Norakuro in Kodansha's anthology magazine Shōnen Kurabu, about an anthropomorphic black and white dog in an army of dogs. Although at first intended to have only a brief lifespan, its immense popularity urged Tagawa to continue producing the strip until 1941. Tagawa has won numerous awards and is recognized as one of the pioneers of the Japanese manga industry. He mentored Machiko Hasegawa, who would become the creator of the popular comic series Sazae-san, and he was an influence to Osamu Tezuka, the "God of Manga". Some other comics by Tagawa are Tako no Yacchan and Gasorin Oyoshi.

After World War II he became a bona fide Christian; he credited the faith in helping him overcome alcoholism after several failed attempts. In 1988, he produced the autobiographical Watashi no Rirekisho ("My Résumé") for the Japanese Sankei Shimbun newspaper. He died in 1989 at the age of 90.
