= PR2 =

PR2 may refer to:

- PR2 (classification), a Paralympic rowing classification
- Aircrew Survival Equipmentman 2nd Class (US Navy rating); previously designated as 'Parachute Rigger 2nd Class', hence PR2
- London Buses route PR2
- Personal Robot 2 open source robot project by sponsored by Willow Garage
- Google PageRank
- πr2, see Area of a disk
- Polskie Radio Program II, a radio channel broadcast by the Polish public broadcaster Polskie Radio
- VR Class Pr2, a locomotive class

PR-2 may refer to:

- Puerto Rico Highway 2
