= Yōji Matsuda =

Japanese actor and voice actor (born 1967)

- 松田 洋治
- Born: October 19, 1967 (age 58); Setagaya, Tokyo, Japan
- Occupations: Actor; voice actor
- Years active: 1972–present
- Height: 165 cm (5 ft 5 in)

Yōji Matsuda (松田 洋治, Matsuda Yōji; born October 19, 1967) is a Japanese actor and voice actor from Tokyo, Japan.

== Early life ==
He was born in Setagaya, Tokyo. His older brother is Naoyuki Matsuda, a musical translator and professor at Komazawa University. After studying at Aoyama Gakuin High School, he dropped out of Aoyama Gakuin University's Faculty of Letters and Department of Education. Among his classmates is a member of the Diet and the House of Councilors Renhō (his classmate from high school to university). He joined the Himawari Theatre Group at age five and made his child debut in the TV drama Mother's Suzu in 1974.

He gained attention as an actor in the 1983 TBS television drama Family Game (as Shigeyuki Numata). He appeared in Nausicaä of the Valley of the Wind in 1984, and in 1987, portrayed the main character Shuna in Shuna's Journey. In 1997, he voiced Ashitaka in the anime movie Princess Mononoke, and voiced Leonardo DiCaprio's role Jack Dawson in the American film Titanic to raise his profile. In 2006, he taught acting as a lecturer at Tokyo Animation College. He became active around the stage, working with directors such as Yukio Ninagawa and Yoji Aoi. He appeared in the drama From the North Country.

== Filmography ==
=== Film ===
- Blue Christmas (1978) (Osamu Min)
- Komugiiro no Tenshi: Suzume to Shōnen (1978) (Sabu)
- Hana no Asuka-gumi! (1988) (Kasuga)
- Dogura magura (1988) (Ichirō Kure)
- Riyū (2004) (Wealthy person's husband)
- The Hidden Blade (2004)
- Kappa (2006)
- Kabei: Our Mother (2008) (Shimazaki)
- Character (2021)

=== Television ===
- Tokugawa Ieyasu (1983) (Matsudaira Motoyasu)
- Hojo Tokimune (2001) Emperor Kameyama
- Unbound (2025) (Murataya Jirobei)

=== Radio drama ===
- Shuna's Journey (1987) (Shuna)

=== Television animation ===
- Ghost in the Shell: Stand Alone Complex (2002) (Marshall McLachlan)
- Kurau Phantom Memory (2004) (Vint)
- A Spirit of the Sun (2006) (Ichirō Yanagi)

=== Theatrical animation ===
- Nausicaä of the Valley of the Wind (1984) (Asbel)
- Princess Mononoke (1997) (Ashitaka)
- The Girl Who Leapt Through Time (2006) (Sōjirō Takase)

=== Video games ===
- Octopath Traveler II (2023) (Hikari Ku)

=== Tokusatsu ===
- Kamen Rider Amazon (1974) (Masahiko Okamura)

=== Narration ===
- Sekai Fureaki Machi Aruki (????)

=== CD ===
- Hakkiya Kōshō (????) (Akama)
- Kaze Hikaru (????) (Okita Sōji)

=== Dubbing roles ===
- Leonardo DiCaprio
  - The Beach (2000 VHS edition) (Richard)
  - Titanic (1998 VHS edition) (Jack Dawson)
- The Art of More (Thomas Graham Connor (Christian Cooke))
- Burnt Offerings (1981 TBS edition) (David "Davey" Rolf (Lee Montgomery))
- Good Morning, Vietnam (Tuan (Tung Thanh Tran))
- Inception (2012 TV Asahi edition) (Arthur (Joseph Gordon-Levitt))
- Spring Waltz (Yoon Jae-ha/Su-ho (Seo Do-young))
