= Nausicaä (Nausicaä of the Valley of the Wind) =

Fictional character created by Hayao Miyazaki

- Nausicaä of the Valley of the Wind character
- Nausicaä, as depicted on the cover of volume 2 of Nausicaä of the Valley of the Wind manga. Teto is on her shoulder.
- Created by: Hayao Miyazaki
- Portrayed by: Onoe Kikunosuke V
- Voiced by: Japanese Sumi Shimamoto; English Susan Davis (Manson dub); Alison Lohman (Disney dub)

In-universe information
- Family: King Jihl (father)
- Nationality: Valley of the Wind

Nausicaä (/ˈnɔːsɪkə/ no-sih-kə; Naushika (ナウシカ; [naɯꜜɕi̥ka])), renamed Zandra in the Manson International Warriors of the Wind English dub, is a fictional character and the protagonist of Hayao Miyazaki's science fiction manga series Nausicaä of the Valley of the Wind and the anime film of the same name. Her story is set in the future on a post-apocalyptic Earth, where Nausicaä is the princess of the Valley of the Wind, a minor kingdom. She assumes the responsibilities of her ill father and succeeds him to the throne over the course of the story. Pushed by her love for others and for life itself, Nausicaä studies the ecology of her world to understand the Sea of Corruption, a system of monstrous flora and fauna which came into being after the Seven Days of Fire.

Nausicaä is characterized as determined and committed. Her magnetic personality attracts admiration and adoration from nearly all those who meet her. Her empathy allows her to communicate with many animals. Nausicaä joins a war between adjacent territories of the remaining inhabitable land. Assuming command of the Valley's small force sets her off on a journey that will alter the course of human existence.

Many experts and manga enthusiasts have interpreted the character. Nausicaä won the seventh Animage Grand Prix, and the June 1987 Grand Prix, coming second in May 1991, and again coming first in December 1992. In 2014, IGN ranked her as the ninth greatest anime character of all time, saying that "She is a genuine, charismatic character who is loved and respected by her people. But she's also a capable, though reluctant, warrior."

== Character outline ==
Although a skillful fighter, Miyazaki's Nausicaä is humane and peace-loving. She has an unusual gift for communicating with the giant insects and is noted for her empathy toward animals, humans, as well as other beings. As an intelligent girl, Nausicaä frequently explores the toxic wasteland, which surrounds the realms and conducts scientific experiments in an attempt to define the true nature and origins of the toxic world in which she lives. Her explorations are facilitated by her skill at "windriding": flying with an advanced glider-like craft called Mehve, equipped with a jet-assist.

== Development ==
Nausicaä has her origins in Miyazaki's aborted anime adaption of Richard Corben's Rowlf, a comic book about princess Maryara of the Land of Canis and her dog Rowlf. Miyazaki found similarities with Beauty and the Beast. The similarities inspired in him the desire to create a character to highlight the theme of "devotion, self-giving". (Note: Recueil d'aquarelles: « la dévotion, le don de soi », Page 147.) Finding Corben's princess "bland", Miyazaki imagined "a young girl with character, brimming with sensitivity, to contrast her with an incapable father". (Note: Recueil d'aquarelles: « fade »... « une jeune fille au caractère affirmé, débordante de sensibilité et assortie d’un père incapable », Page 148.) Named "Yara" (ヤラ, yara) by Miyazaki, short for Corben's Maryara, this character was a young princess left "bearing the crushing weight of her destiny" when her sick father abdicated, bestowing the burden of the kingdom on her and forcing her to bridle her personal aspirations. (Note: Recueil d'aquarelles: « portant le poids écrasant de son destin », Page 148-149. An example from the first volume; She has to go off to wage war on behalf of an allied kingdom, which means that she has to terminate her "secret garden", where she researches the plants from the Sea of Corruption. Animage Special 1, Page 82.) Miyazaki's Yara is initially portrayed with a dog "which always accompanied her from a young age and especially cared for his mistress". This pet dog is found in many design sketches of Yara but is omitted when the story develops. Canis valley eventually becomes Valley of the Wind and the pet dog is replaced with a fictional fox squirrel. Miyazaki intended Yara to wear short pants and moccasins, exposing her bare legs "to effectively show vigorous movements and a dynamic character", but he had to abandon that idea as it did not make sense to expose her legs in the harsh environment that began to evolve as he developed the setting for the story. (Note: Recueil d'aquarelles: « qui l’accompagnait toujours depuis son plus jeune âge et qui éprouvait des sentiments particuliers envers sa maîtresse », Page 178–179, 188, 192–193. July 1983 issue of Animage, page 164–165. Kanō (2006), page 39.) (Note: Recueil d'aquarelles: « rendre efficacement les mouvements vigoureux d’un personnage dynamique », Page 193.)

The transition from Yara to Nausicaä came when Miyazaki began to develop his own character, after the project to adapt Corben's comic fell through. The character went through a few intermediate phases in which the name was retained. Miyazaki had taken a liking to the name "Nausicaä" and he used it to rename his main character.

The name comes from the Phaeacian princess Nausicaa of the Odyssey, who assisted Odysseus. The Nausicaa of the Odyssey was "renowned for her love of nature and music, her fervid imagination and disregard for material possessions".

Miyazaki has written that he identified particularly with Bernard Evslin's description of the character in Gods, Demigods and Demons, translated into Japanese by Minoru Kobayashi. (Note: Mentioned as Minoru Kobayashi (小林稔, Kobayashi Minoru) in the Japanese Webcat Plus database and in Hayao Miyazaki's Watercolor Impressions. In the Japanese edition on page 150 and in the English edition on page 149. On page 150 in the French translation of Watercolor Impressions book, and on some Nausicaä related websites, the translator's name is given as Yataka Kobayashi.) Miyazaki expressed disappointment about not finding the same splendor in the character he had found in Evslin's book when he read Homer's original poem. (Note: Hayao Miyazaki's essay On Nausicaä, Naushika no koto (ナウシカのこと) first published in Japanese in Animage Special 1, Endpaper. Reprinted, in English translation, in Perfect Collection Volume 1. See also McCarthy (1999), page 74.)

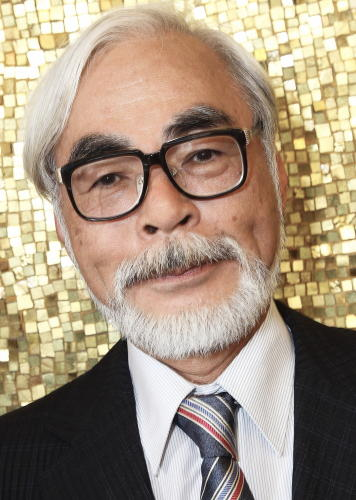
Hayao Miyazaki, the creator of Nausicaä

Another inspiration is the main character from The Lady who Loved Insects, a Japanese tale from the Heian period, one of the short stories collected in the Tsutsumi Chūnagon Monogatari. It tells the story of a young princess who is considered to be rather eccentric by her peers because, although of marriageable age, she prefers to spend her time outdoors studying insects, rather than grooming herself in accordance with the rules and expectations of the society of her era. The princess questions why other people see only the beauty of the butterfly and do not recognize the beauty and usefulness of the caterpillar from which it must grow. Miyazaki notes that the lady would not be perceived the same way in our own time as in the Heian period. He wonders about her ultimate fate, which is not explained in the surviving fragments of the incomplete texts. Miyazaki has said that Evslin's Nausicaa reminds him of this princess, stating that the two characters "became fused into one and created the story". (Note: On Nausicaa.)

Miyazaki also said that Nausicaä is "governed by a kind of animism". Miyazaki felt that it was important to make Nausicaä female because he felt that this allowed him to create more complex villains, saying, "If we try to make an adventure story with a male lead, we have no choice but to do Indiana Jones, with a Nazi or someone else who is a villain in everyone's eyes." Miyazaki said of Nausicaä that "[She] is not a protagonist who defeats an opponent, but a protagonist who understands, or accepts. She is someone who lives in a different dimension. That kind of person should be female, not male." When asked about Nausicaä's "vision and intellect far greater than other people's", her "distinguished fighting skills", as well as her leadership, including taking "the role of legendary savior", Miyazaki said that he wanted to create a heroine who was not a "consummately normal" person, "just like you or everyone else around you".

Nausicaä's affinity with the wind was inspired by translations of European geography books from the Middle Ages, where mastery of the wind was described as "witchcraft" and was feared and respected. Mills were described in these books as being used for "pushing sand dunes or grinding grain", which left an impression on Miyazaki. Inspired by the Earthsea cycle of Ursula K. Le Guin, Miyazaki coined the term kaze tsukai (風使い) as an alternative to Le Guin's "Master Windkey", which was translated into Japanese as kaze no shi (風の司, "one who controls the wind"). (Note: Recueil d'aquarelles: « repousser l’avancée des dunes ou moudre le grain », Page 150.)

Miyazaki had intended to make Yara more pulpy than his other female characters, a feature of sketches of her created between 1980 and 1982. (Note: Recueil d'aquarelles, Page 178.) However, he realized that he could not draw Nausicaä nude without feeling like he should apologize, changing his idea of the story to be more "spiritual". When Miyazaki draws Nausicaä in poses which are a little "sexy", like the cover of Animage in March 1993, where Nausicaä smiles while wearing a torn tank top, he cautions that "Nausicaä never takes such a pose"; however, this does not prevent him from drawing her like this, (Note: Recueil d'aquarelles: « Nausicaä ne prendrait jamais une telle pose », Page 68.) saying, "Well, if I hadn't drawn her as beautiful, there would have been some problems. I thought that I should settle down and draw her consistently, but every time I drew her, her face changed—even I was overpowered." He felt that over the 14-year run of the manga, rather than Nausicaä changing as a character, instead Miyazaki felt that he understood her better. When Miyazaki is obligated to draw Nausicaä smiling for covers or character posters, he finds it difficult because "it does not match the character of [my] heroine". (Note: Recueil d'aquarelles: « ça ne correspond pas au caractère de [son] héroïne », Page 26.) He does not like "representing Nausicaä as too radiant or with the attitudes typical of a heroine", and imagines that instead of this, when she is alone, she has a "serious ... calm and collected" (but "not surly") attitude. (Note: Recueil d'aquarelles: « représenter Nausicaä trop rayonnante ou dans des attitudes typiques d’héroïne » ... « grave ... calme et posée » ... « pas renfrognée », Page 80.) He regards her "sombre and reserved" nature to be offset by her femininity. Miyazaki believes that characters like this, "far from being fulfilled ... are the most altruistic." (Note: Recueil d'aquarelles: « sombre et réservée ».... « loin d’être épanouis ... sont les plus altruistes », Page 152.)

The kana Miyazaki chose to write Nausicaä's name in, ナウシカ (na-u-shi-ka), follows the spelling used by Kobayashi for the translations of Evslin's work. Miyazaki prefers it to other transcriptions of Nausicaä also in use, ノシカ (no-shi-ka) and ノジカ (no-ji-ka, ji pronounced /ʑi/). (Note: Recueil d'aquarelles, Page 150.) In English, the Greek name is normally pronounced /nɔːˈsɪkeɪ.ə/, but in the soundtrack for the film it is /ˈnɔːsɪkə/.

Helen McCarthy considers Shuna from Shuna's Journey to be prototypical to Nausicaä,.

== Plot overview ==
The story of the manga, refined by Miyazaki over 13 years between February 1982 and March 1994, was published in the magazine Animage and collected into seven volumes. It is much more complex than the story told by the film.

The film was developed in 1983, when Tokuma Shoten, the publisher of Animage, felt that the manga was successful enough to make "a gamble" at a film being economically viable. The film takes the context and characters, but the scenario is radically different from that of the manga, although many scenes from the manga (corresponding roughly to the first two volumes) were used with only slight changes.

In the summary below, parts of the manga where Nausicaä is absent have been omitted to focus on the character.

=== In the manga ===
Nausicaä is the 16-year-old princess of the Valley of the Wind, a very small nation with fewer than 500 inhabitants (and steadily declining in population). She is the eleventh child of King Jihl and the only one to live to maturity. She is rarely seen without her Mehve or her companion, Teto the fox-squirrel. At the beginning of the manga, Nausicaä, the princess of the Valley of the Wind, is set to succeed her ill father, who can no longer go to war to honor an old alliance. Under the command of the princess of Tolmekia, Kushana, Nausicaä needs to go to war against the Dorok Empire in a suicide mission across the Sea of Corruption. (Note: The mission, given by the brothers of Kushana, is a trap as they fear losing their sister.) Delayed in the forest by the attack of Asbel, where she saves the insects, she encounters a tribe of Dorok and learns of their plans to destroy the Tolmekian army. She helps the baby Ohmu which was tortured by the Dorok to attract the insects to the Tolmekian army and her dress is stained blue with its blood. She is recognized as "The Blue Clad One", a figure in the Dorok mythos who is fated to cause a revolution in the world.

Having awakened the old heretical legends, Nausicaä becomes a mortal enemy of Miralupa, the younger of the two brothers who rule the Dorok Empire, who uses his mental powers to try to infiltrate her mind when she is weak. Miralupa is betrayed and murdered by his older brother, Namulith and at the doors of death, finds his redemption in the spirit of Nausicaä. Nausicaä discovers that the Dorok are using a new fungus of the forest as a biological weapon to extend their reach. She arrives at an understanding of the role of the Sea of Corruption and its inhabitants in the process of purifying the Earth.

When Namulith decides to forcefully marry Kushana to form a single empire under his rule she initially feigns acceptance but later rejects him and his proposal. His grand designs start to unravel. In a confrontation with Nausicaä, Namulith spitefully foists a rediscovered god-warrior off on Nausicaä in revenge and shoulders her with the burden of taking care of the reactivated creature and the responsibility for saving the world. (Note: Namulith is annoyed by Nausicaä's messianic side and her propensity to elevate people. She reminds him of Miralupa when he was briefly a philanthropist, about a century earlier. Quote: "I will destroy your reputation and humiliate you. The warrior-god will return you to right. [...] Take all on your shoulders and see if you can save this world!" Based on the French translation of the manga: « Je briserai ta réputation et je t’humilierai. [...] Le dieu-guerrier te reviendra de droit […] Porte tout cela sur tes épaules, et voyons si tu peux sauver ce monde !!») The god-warrior is a living weapon, an artifact from the ancient world which led to the Seven Days of Fire. Not knowing what to do with this immeasurably dangerous and uncontrollable creature who takes her for its mother, found at Pejite, then stolen by the Tolmekians and finally by the Dorok, Nausicaä names the god-warrior Ohma. She decides to go with Ohma to the Crypt of Shuwa to seal all the technologies of the ancient world behind its doors. However, Ohma is damaged and crash lands near some ruins. Hidden within these ruins Nausicaä discovers the Garden of Shuwa, a repository of seeds, animals, as well as cultural knowledge from previous ages.

She goes through a test of character, as the Master of the Garden imitates her mother to tempt her to stay. She outwits the Master and learns the secrets of the Sea of Corruption and the Crypt. Meanwhile, Ohma, controlled by the Tolmekian Emperor Vuh, fights the Master of the Crypt. After cracking the crypt, Ohma dies of his wounds. Nausicaä finally joins in destroying the foundations of the building, sealing the old technology inside.

=== In the film ===
After finding the shell of an Ohmu while collecting spores in the Toxic Forest, Nausicaä rescues Lord Yupa from an Ohmu that she pacifies. Lord Yupa gives Nausicaä a fox squirrel she names Teto. Upon returning to the Valley of the Wind, Obaba tells the legend of the Blue Clad One, who will walk in a field of gold and renew the lost link with the Earth. That night, a Tolmekian cargo plane crashes into the Valley after being attacked by insects. Nausicaä rescues a mortally wounded survivor Lastelle, a princess of Pejite who pleads for the ship's cargo to be destroyed. When the people of the Valley of the Wind try to destroy the airborne spores of the Toxic Jungle, they find a wounded insect that Nausicaä guides back to the Toxic Jungle.

The cargo of the Tolmekian ship, a hibernating god-warrior, is retrieved by the Valley's people, and soon they are invaded by many Tolmekian ships and soldiers who kill Nausicaä's father King Jihl, a few of which Nausicaä kills out of rage before being stopped by Yupa. The Tolmekians, led by Princess Kushana, intend to retrieve and awaken the god-warrior and use it to burn the Toxic Jungle. Obaba opposes this idea, saying that all who have tried to destroy the forest have been killed by the angry Ohmu and the jungle grew over their towns and bodies. However, to avoid a slaughter, Nausicaä agrees to become Kushana's hostage and accompany her to rejoin the main Tolmekian army at the city of Pejite, which the Tolmekians have already conquered.

During the journey, they are attacked by Lastelle's brother Asbel, who almost destroys the entire fleet and is apparently killed. Mito, Nausicaä and Kushana escape using the gunship and land in the jungle. Nausicaä communicates with the Ohmu and discovers that Asbel is alive and she uses her glider to rescue him. They sink into the sands of the jungle and discover a non-toxic world beneath the jungle. Nausicaä realizes that the plants of the jungle are purifying the soil and producing clean water and air.

After getting out of the Toxic Jungle, they head back to Pejite, only to find it ravaged and full of deceased people and insects. A brig full of Pejite survivors lands nearby, and the Mayor of Pejite, leader of the group, reveals that they provoked the insects to wipe out the Tolmekian occupiers, and now plan to do the same to the Valley of the Wind, much to Nausicaä's horror. They capture her when she tries to fly away to warn the Valley people, and knock out Asbel when he tries to intervene. However, she is freed by Lastelle's mother and other Pejite people, who help her escape. She soon discovers two Pejite soldiers using a wounded baby Ohm to lure thousands of Ohm into the Valley. As the Tolmekians fight against the Ohm, the Giant Warrior, having hatched prematurely, disintegrates after killing a fraction of the Ohm.

Meanwhile, Nausicaä fights the Pejite soldiers and liberates the baby Ohm, but the pink dress she received from Asbel's mother is drenched in the Ohm's blue blood. Nausicaä and the Ohm return to the Valley and stand before the herd but are run over. The Ohm calm down and resuscitate her with their golden antennae resembling vines. Nausicaä walks atop the vines as though golden fields, fulfilling the savior prophecy. With the Valley saved, the Ohm and Tolmekians leave as the Pejites remain with the Valley people, helping them rebuild. Deep underneath the Toxic Jungle, a non-toxic tree sprouts.

== Actors ==
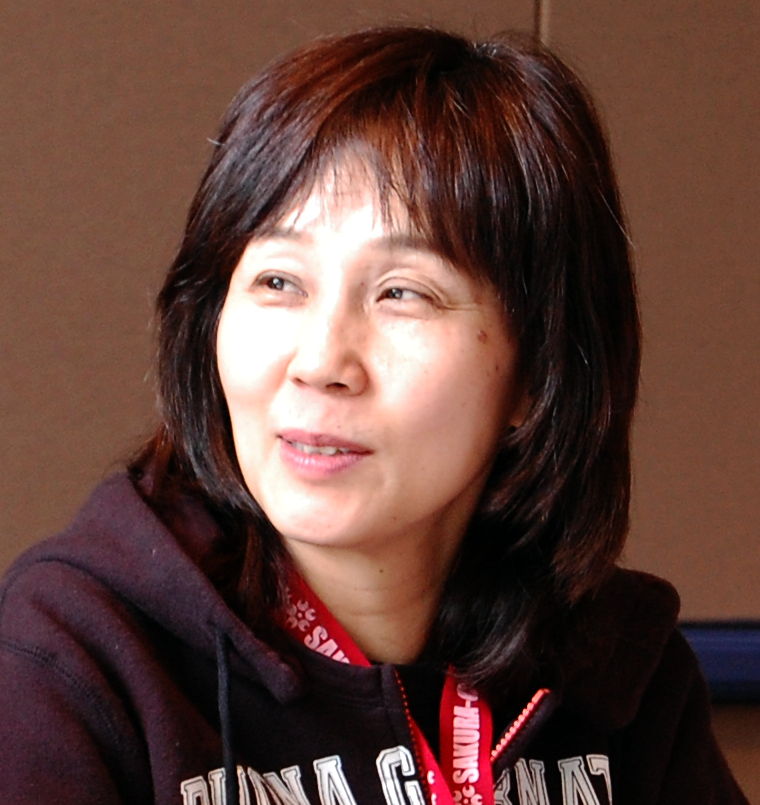
Sumi Shimamoto, who voiced Nausicaä in the original Japanese version

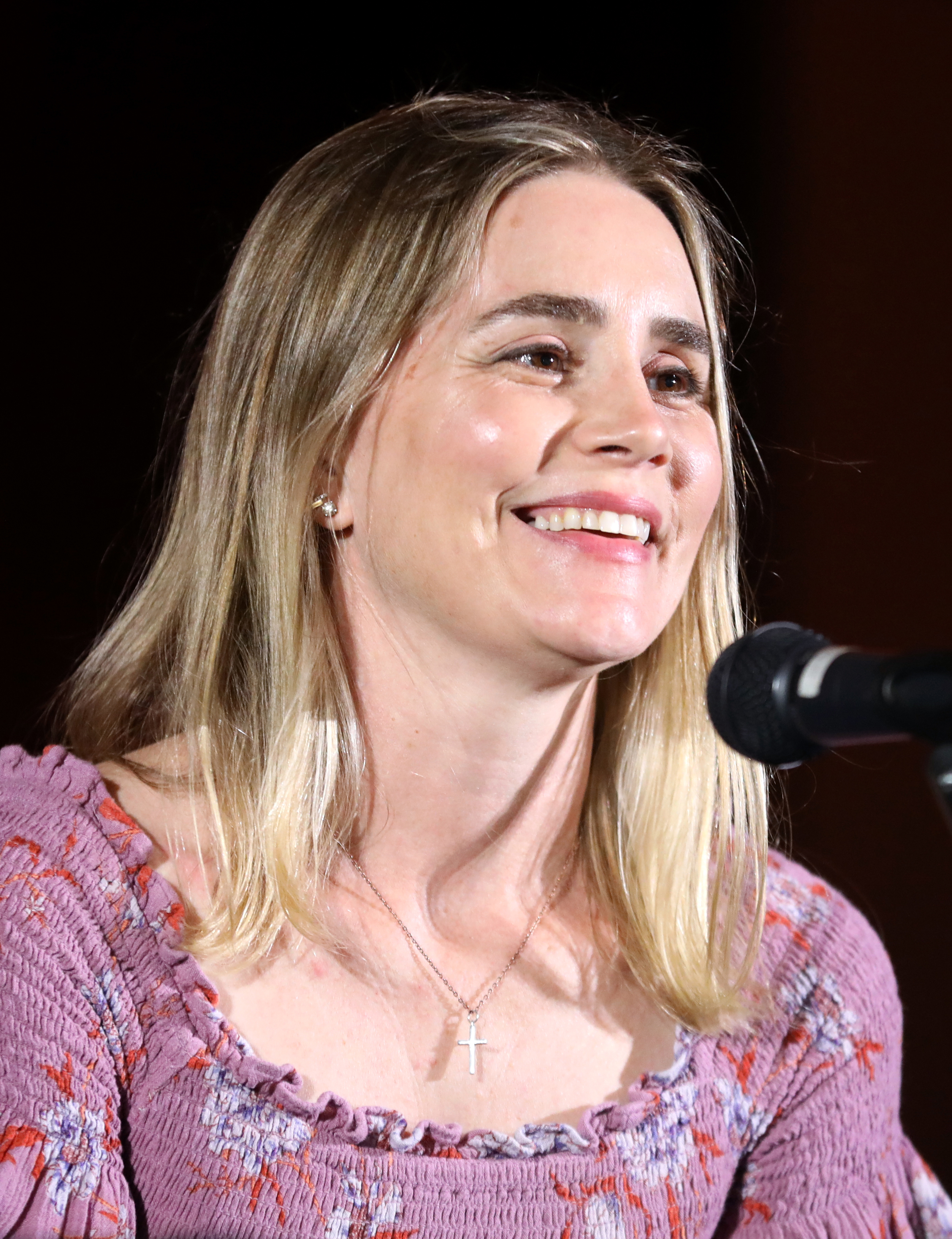
Alison Lohman, who voiced Nausicaä in the Disney English dub

Nausicaä is voiced in Japanese by Sumi Shimamoto, who won the role after impressing Hayao Miyazaki with her performance of Clarisse in Lupin III: The Castle of Cagliostro. (Note: McCarthy (1999), page 57.) Patrick Drazen praised Shimamoto's acting in a scene where Nausicaä stops an insect from diving into an acidic pool by getting in its way. She is burned by the acid and she screams. Drazen described this scream as being one which "tears at the listener and raises the bar for cartoon voices".

In Walt Disney Pictures' English dub of the movie, Nausicaä's voice was performed by Alison Lohman. Lohman beat out Natalie Portman for the role. Her performance was lauded by critics and audiences alike.

For the 2019 kabuki play adaptation, Onoe Kikunosuke V portrayed Nausicaä.

== Reception ==
In a chapter dealing with "Female masculinity and fantasy spaces", Nausicaä is described as being a "strong young female lead drawn strongly from the shoujo tradition", relating the story of a Takarazuka Revue playwright called Ogita who compares his work with Miyazaki's. For Ogita, it is most important that the heroines of Miyazaki are pure and asexual, to emphasise themes of purity and strength; who "takes charge" of her own life. Nausicaä has also been said to have a "brave and wholesome" mind, and as "one of the best examples of a truly 'empowered' female". Stig Høgset found the too-perfect portrayal of Nausicaä to be unrealistic. Susan J. Napier argues that as Nausicaä is the heroine of an epic, her competence, powers, and presentation as a messiah are not part of Nausicaä being an unrealistic character, but instead, she is real as a character inside the epic genre. In the beginning of the film, Nausicaä is presented as "a mix of precocity and fairy-tale innocence", her innocence coming not from naivety but from scientific wonder. Early in the story, she kills the warriors who killed her father, which Susan J. Napier described as "genuinely shocking", and Kaori Yoshida points to as evidence of Nausicaä representing "traditional masculinity rather than femininity". When she avenges her father's death, the scene is "ambivalent" in its message, suggesting both "a masculine rite-of-passage" and "a moral object lesson", which makes Nausicaä afraid of her own power. Nausicaä later "comes to regret her vengeance" and becomes a diplomat to prevent further wars between the different states. Although Nausicaä is a warrior, Nausicaä acts "reassuringly cute" such as taming Teto and calling things "pretty", which contrasts her with San of Princess Mononoke. Inaga Shimegi feels that Teto's taming is the first glimpse of Nausicaä's "supernatural ability of communication". Thomas Zoth regards Nausicaä as "Miyazaki's archetypal heroine" and notes shades of her in Ashitaka, San and Lady Eboshi of Princess Mononoke.

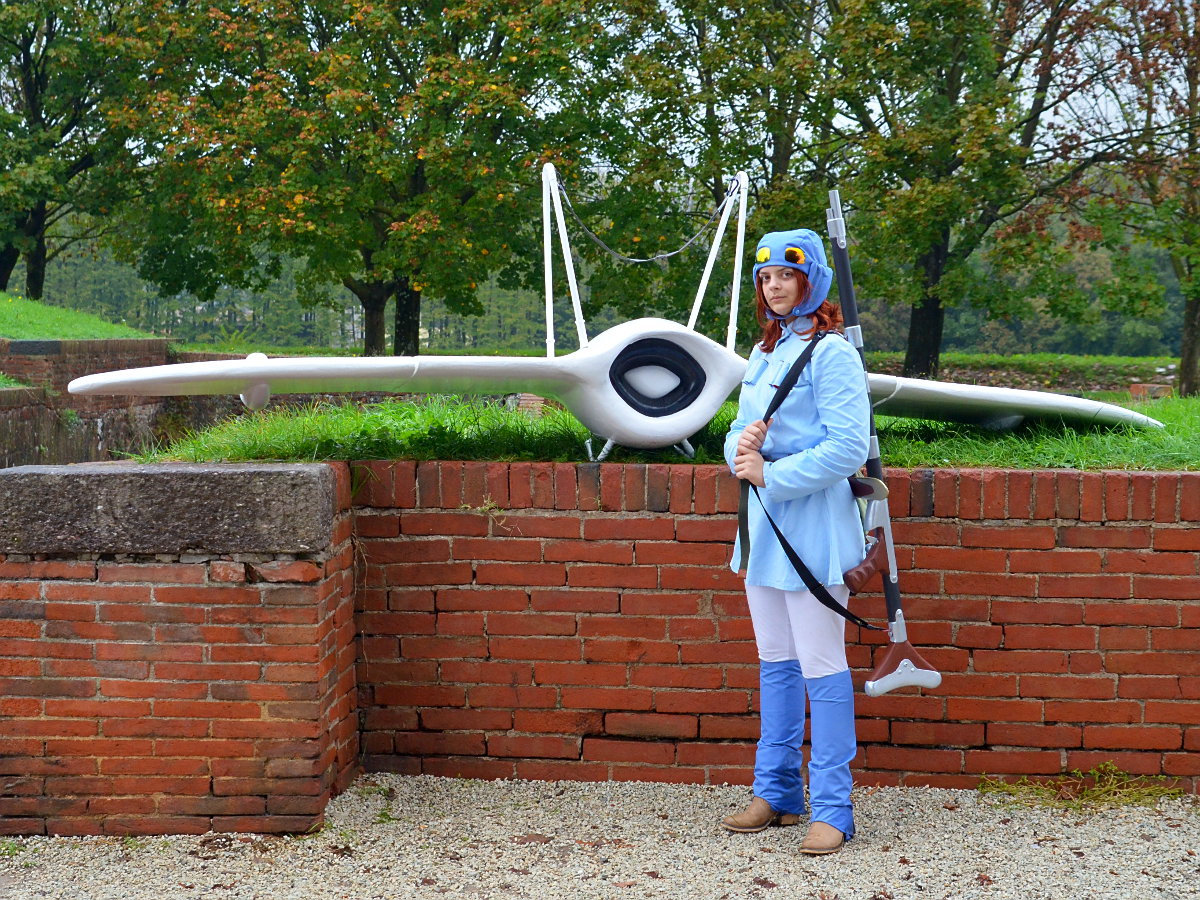
A cosplayer donning on the character's costume for Lucca Comics & Games 2013.

Opinion is divided as to whether Nausicaä is sexualized or not - Napier notes that Nausicaä's relationship with Asbel is "potentially erotic", but Kaori Yoshida says that Nausicaä's body "is not the typical kind designed to stimulate" the male gaze. The quality of tapes on early fansubs lead to the rumor that Nausicaä does not wear any pants. Yoshida presents Hiromi Murase's theory that Nausicaä represents a post-oedipal mother figure. Susan J. Napier and Patrick Drazen note a parallel between the character of Kushana, the rival warrior princess, and that of Nausicaä: Napier describes Kushana as Nausicaä's "shadow", noting that Kushana is not shown with any "alleviating, feminine" virtues as Nausicaä is, but that they share the same tactical brilliance. Drazen describes this as a "feminine duality". Miyazaki has described the two characters as being "two sides of the same coin", but Kushana has "deep, physical wounds".

Nausicaä is presented as a messiah and also acts on an ideology of how to interact with the natural world. Her powers are presented as proof of the "rightness" of her "mode of thought". Unlike other characters who avoid or try to ignore the forest, Nausicaä is scientifically and beatifically interested in the forest. Lucy Wright believes that Nausicaä's world-view reflects a Shinto worldview, as expressed by Motoori Norinaga: "this heaven and earth and all things therein are without exception strange and marvelous when examined carefully". Wright believes that Nausicaä is presented as a "healing deity", as she is concerned with the space between purity and corruption, as well as atones for the wrongs of other people. In the manga, Nausicaä faces an old monk who says "the death of the world is inescapable" because of the folly of men; Nausicaä retorts: "Our God of the Winds teaches us that life is above all! And I love life! The light, the sky, the men, the insects, I love them all more than anything!!" Later, she responds to the Guardian of the tomb of Shuwa who tries to tell her she is selfish for refusing the purification program of the old Earth and allowing the sacrifice of all the lives of the ancient world: "We can know the beauty and the cruelty of the world without the help of a giant tomb and its retinue of servants. Because our god, he lives in the smallest leaf and the smallest insect." Raphaël Colson and Gaël Régner see in these tirades a "world view which clearly calls to mind the spirit of Shinto".

When the god soldier is activated, he chooses Nausicaä to be his "mother" and asks her who she wants him to kill. Marc Hairston considers this to be a recurring theme throughout the manga: Nausicaä is given power and is told to make difficult decisions. In 2000, Nausicaä placed eleventh in an Animax poll of favorite anime characters. The first daughter of Jean Giraud is named after the character. The character Nakiami from Xam'd: Lost Memories has been noted to bear many similarities to Nausicaä.

Frederik L. Schodt believes that in the film, Nausicaä's character became "slightly sweeter, almost sappy" and suggests that her "high voice" and the low camera angles which show the bottom of her skirt to be due to "an emphasis on 'prepubescent female cuteness' in commercial animation". Marc Hairston reads the 1995 music video "On Your Mark" as being Miyazaki's "symbolic release" of Nausicaä.

Raphaël Colson and Gaël Régner feel that Nausicaä had "to grow up faster than her age" because of her responsibilities, but that she acts with maturity, diplomacy, attention and resolve. They see her as "the princess of an idealised feudal system ... loved and respected by her subjects, ... feared and admired by her enemies." The Star Wars sequel trilogy character Rey as depicted in her first appearance in the 2015 film Star Wars: The Force Awakens has been likened to Nausicaä, with both having generally similar personalities and strikingly similar headgear (both hearkening back to the classic aviator look).
