= Nausicaä of the Valley of the Wind (film) =

1984 film by Hayao Miyazaki

- Theatrical release poster by Yoshiyuki Takani

Japanese name
- Japanese: 風の谷のナウシカ
Transcriptions
- Revised Hepburn: Kaze no Tani no Naushika
- Directed by: Hayao Miyazaki
- Screenplay by: Hayao Miyazaki
- Based on: Nausicaä of the Valley of the Wind by Hayao Miyazaki
- Produced by: Isao Takahata
- Starring: Sumi Shimamoto; Gorō Naya; Yōji Matsuda; Yoshiko Sakakibara; Iemasa Kayumi
- Cinematography: Koji Shiragami; Yukitomo Shudo; Yasuhiro Shimizu; Mamoru Sugiura
- Edited by: Tomoko Kida; Naoko Kaneko; Masatsugu Sakai
- Music by: Joe Hisaishi
- Production company: Topcraft
- Distributed by: Toei Company
- Release date: 11 March 1984 (Japan)
- Running time: 117 minutes
- Country: Japan
- Language: Japanese
- Budget: US$1 million
- Box office: $14.3 million

Nausicaä of the Valley of the Wind (Note: Japanese: 風の谷のナウシカ, Hepburn: Kaze no Tani no Naushika) is a 1984 Japanese animated post-apocalyptic fantasy film written and directed by Hayao Miyazaki, based on his 1982 manga of the same name. It was produced by Topcraft and distributed by Toei Company. Joe Hisaishi, in his first collaboration with Miyazaki, composed the score. The film stars the voices of Sumi Shimamoto, Gorō Naya, Yōji Matsuda, Yoshiko Sakakibara, and Iemasa Kayumi. Set in a post-nuclear futuristic world, it tells the story of Nausicaä (Shimamoto), the pacifist teenage princess of the Valley of the Wind who becomes embroiled in a struggle with Tolmekia, an empire that attempts to use an ancient weapon to eradicate a jungle populated by oversized, mutant insects.

Nausicaä of the Valley of the Wind was released in Japan on 11 March 1984. The film received critical acclaim, with praise being directed at the story, themes, characters and animation. It is commonly regarded as one of the greatest animated films, and was the second-highest-ranked animation in a poll conducted by Japan's Agency for Cultural Affairs in 2006. Though it was released before Studio Ghibli was founded, it is often considered a Ghibli work due to its themes, and is usually released as part of DVD and Blu-ray collections of Ghibli work.

A heavily edited version of the film commissioned by Manson International, titled Warriors of the Wind, was released in the United States and other markets throughout the mid-to-late 1980s. The Manson cut was derided by Miyazaki, and prompted Ghibli to establish a policy prohibiting future international licensors from editing its films for foreign release. It was eventually replaced in circulation by an uncut, redubbed version produced by Walt Disney Studios in 2005.

== Plot ==
One thousand years have passed since the Seven Days of Fire, an apocalyptic war that destroyed civilization and caused an ecocide, creating the vast Toxic Jungle, (Note: Toxic Jungle in both of the film's English-dubbed versions, Sea of Decay in the film's English-subtitled version) a poisonous forest swarming with giant mutant insects. In the kingdom of the Valley of the Wind, a prophecy predicts a savior "clothed in a blue robe, descending onto a golden field". The Valley's 16-year-old princess Nausicaä explores the jungle and communicates with its creatures, including the gigantic, trilobite-like armored Ohm. (Note: Pronunciation: /oʊm/. The Japanese name, Ō mu(shi) (王蟲), consists of the kanji for king and insect or bug. Transliterated as Ohmu in manga translations and as Ohm in the film's subtitles.) She hopes to understand the jungle and find a way for it and humans to coexist.

One morning, a massive cargo aircraft from the militaristic Empire of Tolmekia crashes in the Valley despite Nausicaä's efforts to save it. Its sole survivor, Princess Lastelle of Pejite, asks Nausicaä to destroy the cargo before she dies. The cargo is an embryo of a Giant Warrior, one of the lethal, gargantuan humanoid bioweapons that caused the Seven Days of Fire. Tolmekia seized the embryo and Lastelle from Pejite, but their plane was unable to support the embryo's weight and landed in the forest, causing the insects to attack. One of the insects emerges wounded from the wreckage and poises to attack, but Nausicaä uses a bullroarer to calm it and guides it away from the village.

Soon after, Tolmekian soldiers under the command of Princess Kushana invade the Valley and kill Nausicaä's father, Jihl. Nausicaä briefly fights the Tolmekians, but the Valley's elderly swordsmaster, Yupa, intervenes and ushers both Nausicaä and the Tolmekians to stand down. Kushana, having retrieved the Giant Warrior's embryo, plans to mature and use the bioweapon to burn the Toxic Jungle. The valley's wise woman, Obaba, warns that such a feat cannot be done as many have tried to destroy the forest before, but the Ohm have attacked and destroyed many cities and killed thousands of people. Yupa discovers a secret garden of jungle plants that had been cared for by Nausicaä; according to her findings, plants that grow in clean soil and water are not toxic, but the jungle's soil has been tainted by pollution.

Kushana leaves for Tolmekian-occupied Pejite with Nausicaä and five hostages from the Valley, but a Pejite interceptor shoots down the Tolmekian airships carrying them. Nausicaä, Kushana and the hostages crash-land in the jungle, disturbing several Ohm, which Nausicaä soothes. She leaves to rescue the interceptor's pilot, who turns out to be Princess Lastelle's twin brother, Asbel, but both crash through a stratum of quicksand into a non-toxic area below the Toxic Jungle. Nausicaä realizes that the jungle plants purify the polluted topsoil, producing clean water and soil underground.

Nausicaä and Asbel reach Pejite but find it ravaged by insects. They learn that the local survivors lured the insects to eradicate the Tolmekians, and are doing the same to the Valley. Nausicaä is taken prisoner, but escapes with the help of a group of Pejite sympathizers, including Asbel and his mother. She soon discovers two Pejite soldiers using a wounded baby Ohm to lure thousands of Ohm into the Valley. As the Tolmekians fight against the Ohm, the Giant Warrior, having hatched prematurely, disintegrates after killing a fraction of the Ohm.

Meanwhile, Nausicaä fights the Pejite soldiers and liberates the baby Ohm, but the pink dress she received from Asbel's mother is drenched in the Ohm's blue blood. Nausicaä and the Ohm return to the Valley and stand before the herd but are run over. The Ohm calm down and resuscitate her with their golden antennae resembling vines. Nausicaä walks atop the vines as though golden fields, fulfilling the savior prophecy. With the Valley saved, the Ohm and Tolmekians leave as the Pejites remain with the Valley people, helping them rebuild. Deep underneath the Toxic Jungle, a non-toxic tree sprouts.

== Voice cast ==
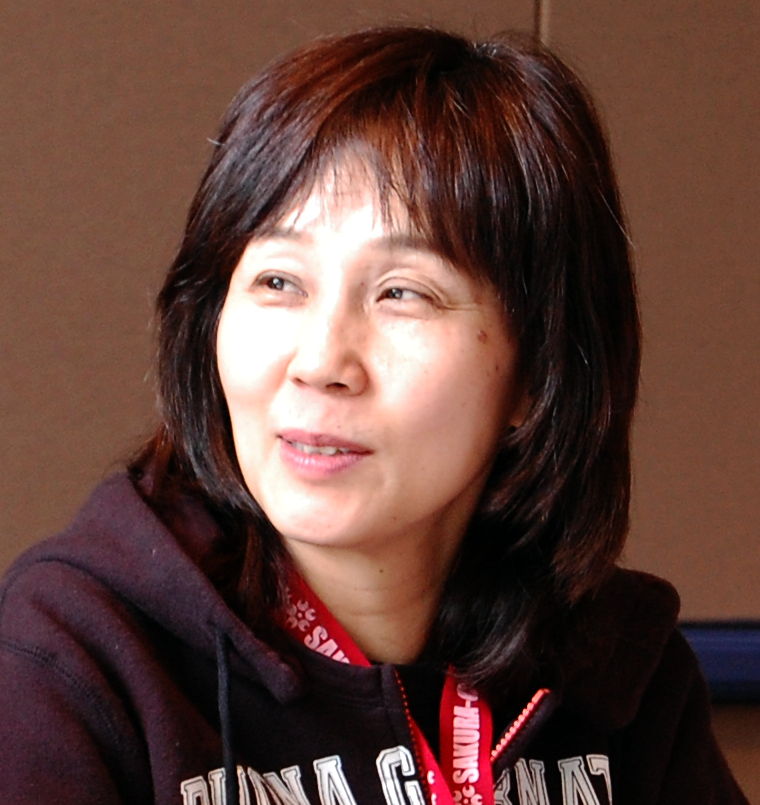
Sumi Shimamoto, who voiced Nausicaä in the original Japanese version

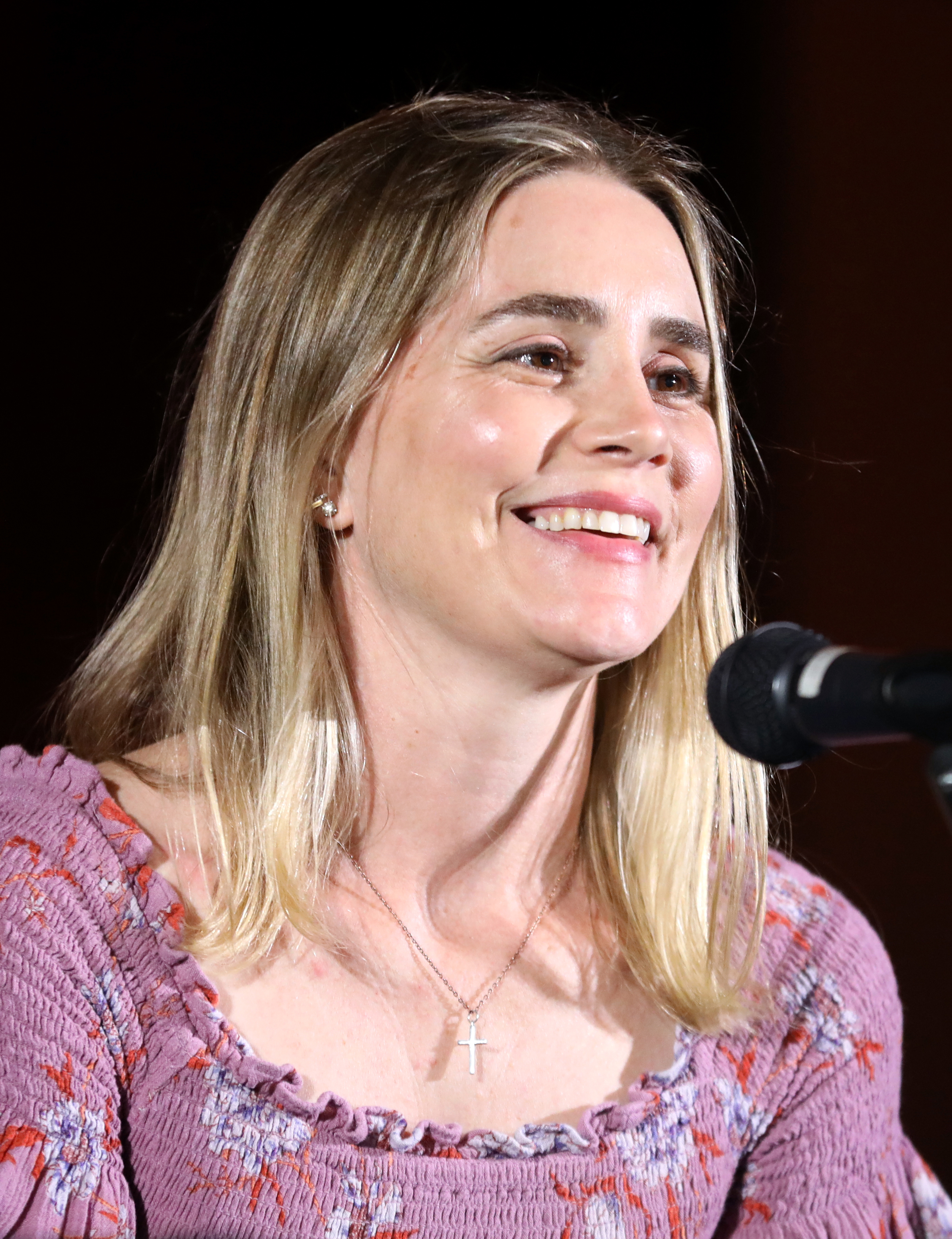
Alison Lohman, who voiced Nausicaä in the Disney English dub

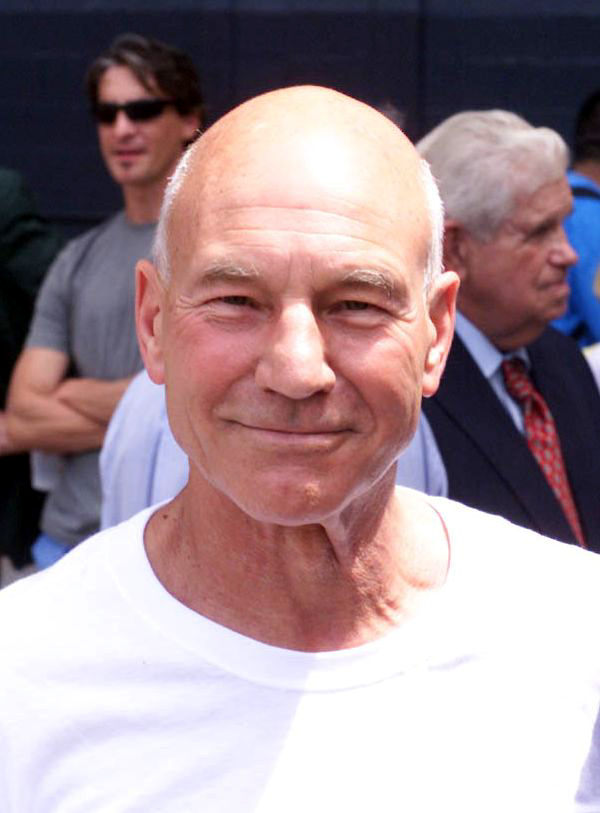
Patrick Stewart, who voiced Lord Yupa in the Disney English dub

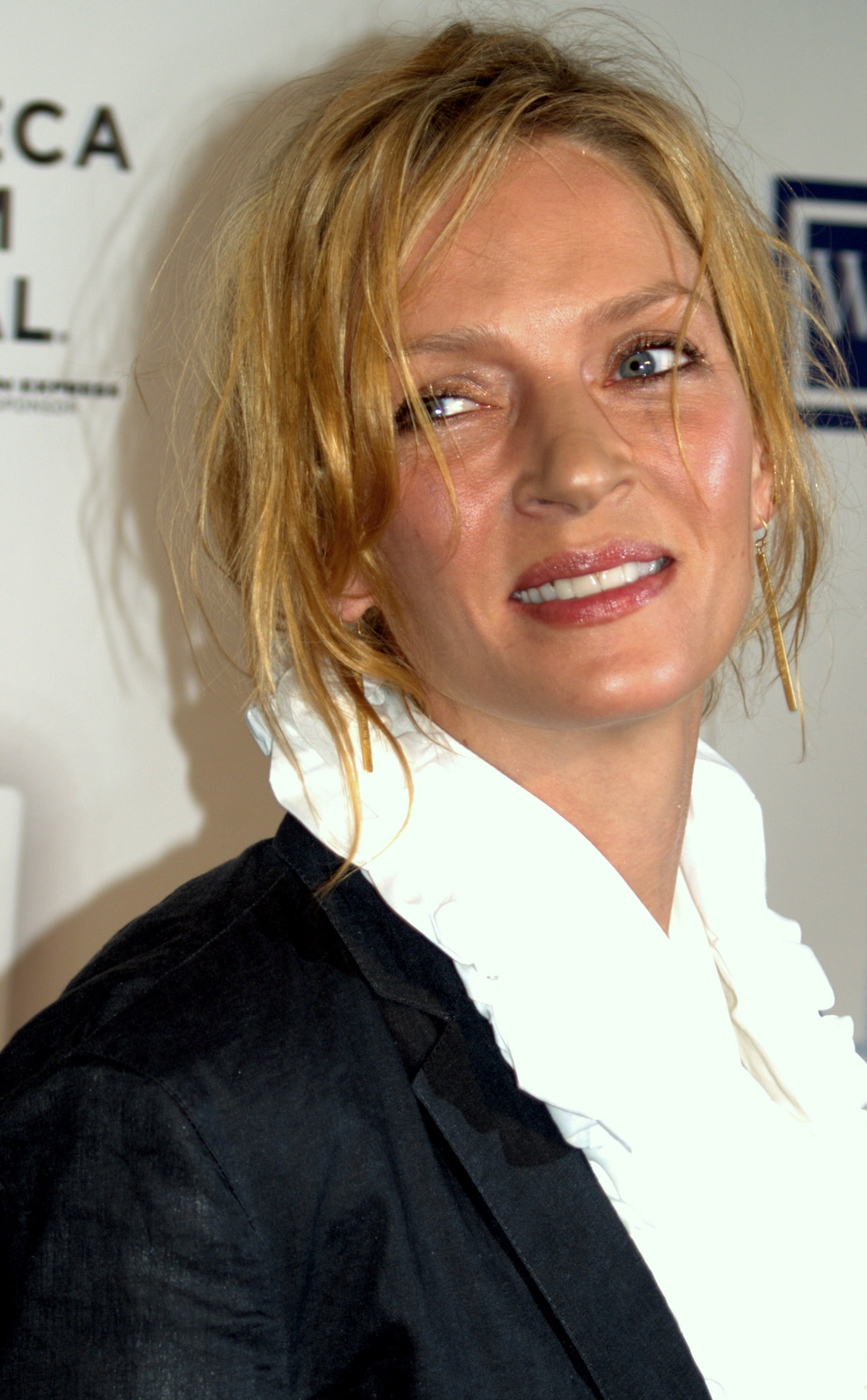
Uma Thurman, who voiced Kushana in the Disney English dub

Character name		Voice actor		
Japanese/English Disney dub	English Manson dub	Japanese	English	
Japanese/English Disney dub	English Manson dub	Japanese	(Manson/Showmen, Inc., 1985) (Note: Several characters were renamed in the Manson International release (titled Warriors of the Wind), as indicated in parentheses.)	(Disney, 2005)
Nausicaä (ナウシカ, Naushika)	Princess Zandra	Sumi Shimamoto	Susan Davis	Alison Lohman
Lord Yupa (ユパ・ミラルダ, Yupa Miraruda)	Lord Yupa	Gorō Naya	Hal Smith	Patrick Stewart
Asbel (アスベル, Asuberu)	Prince Milo	Yōji Matsuda	Cam Clarke	Shia LaBeouf
Kushana (クシャナ)	Queen Selena	Yoshiko Sakakibara	Linda Gary	Uma Thurman
Kurotowa (クロトワ)	General Rogan	Iemasa Kayumi	Unknown	Chris Sarandon
Mito (ミト)	Axel	Ichirō Nagai	Hal Smith	Edward James Olmos
Obaba (大ババ, Ōbaba)	Old Lady	Hisako Kyōda	Linda Gary	Tress MacNeille
Gol (ゴル, Goru)	Gol	Kōhei Miyauchi	Unknown	Frank Welker
Gikuri (ギックリ, Gikkuri)	Gikuri	Jōji Yanami	Riley Jackson	Jeff Bennett
Niga (ニガ)	Niga	Minoru Yada	Unknown	Mark Silverman
King Jihl (ジル, Jiru)	King Zeal	Mahito Tsujimura	Unknown	Mark Silverman
Muzu (ムズ)	Muzu	Mahito Tsujimura	Riley Jackson	James Arnold Taylor
Lastelle (ラステル, Rasuteru)	Listelle	Miina Tominaga	Unknown	Emily Bauer
Mayor of Pejite (ペジテ市長, Pejite shichō)	Mayor of Placida	Makoto Terada	Unknown	Mark Hamill
Asbel and Lastelle's mother (ラステルの母, Rasuteru no haha)	Milo and Listelle's mother	Akiko Tsuboi	Linda Gary	Jodi Benson
Teto (テト)	Foxy	Rihoko Yoshida	Rihoko Yoshida	Rihoko Yoshida
Commando (コマンド, Komando)	Commando	Tetsuo Mizutori	Unknown	—N/a
Pejite peasant girl (ペジテの少女, Pejite no shōjo)	Placida girl	Takako Ōta	Susan Davis	Ashley Rose Orr
Narrator		—N/a	Hal Smith	Tony Jay

== Production ==
Hayao Miyazaki made his feature directorial debut in 1979 with Lupin III: The Castle of Cagliostro, a film which went on to receive the Ōfuji Noburō Award at the 1979 Mainichi Film Awards. Miyazaki had previously co-directed episodes of the television series Lupin The Third Part I with Isao Takahata. Although The Castle of Cagliostro was not a box office success, Toshio Suzuki, editor of the magazine Animage, was impressed by the film and encouraged Miyazaki to produce works for Animage's publisher Tokuma Shoten. Miyazaki began writing the manga Nausicaä of the Valley of the Wind in 1981, and it quickly became Animage's most popular feature. Toshio Suzuki and the magazine's other editors encouraged Miyazaki to work on a film adaptation. Miyazaki initially refused, as he had a deal with Tokuma to never adapt the manga into a film, but agreed on the condition that he could direct.

In the early stages, Isao Takahata, credited as executive producer, reluctantly joined the project even before the animation studio was chosen. An outside studio to produce the film was needed because Tokuma Shoten did not own an animation studio: Miyazaki and Takahata chose the minor studio Topcraft. The production studio's work was known to both Miyazaki and Takahata and was chosen because its artistic talent could transpose the sophisticated atmosphere of the manga to the film. On 31 May 1983, work began on the pre-production of the film. With at that point only sixteen chapters of the manga to work with, Miyazaki encountered difficulties in creating the screenplay. He ended up taking elements of the story and refocusing the narrative and characters on the Tolmekian invasion of Nausicaä's homeland. Takahata enlisted the experimental and minimalist composer Joe Hisaishi to compose the film's score.

The film was made on a production schedule of only nine months and with a budget equivalent to US$1 million. Animation work began in August 1983, produced by animators who were paid by the frame. One notable animator was Hideaki Anno, a founding member of Gainax, who among later works wrote and directed the acclaimed series Neon Genesis Evangelion. Anno was assigned to draw the challenging Giant Warrior's attack sequence, which according to Toshio Suzuki, is a "high point in the film". Anno considers Evangelion a continuation of Nausicaä, done in his own way.

== Influences and themes ==
Miyazaki's work on Nausicaä of the Valley of the Wind was inspired by a range of works, including Ursula K. Le Guin's Earthsea, Brian Aldiss's Hothouse, Isaac Asimov's Nightfall, and J. R. R. Tolkien's The Lord of the Rings. Miyazaki also says he took possible inspiration from The Lady who Loved Insects Japanese folktale. Protagonist Nausicaä was inspired in name and personality by Homer's Phaeacian princess in the Odyssey. According to a number of reviewers, Frank Herbert's science fiction novel Dune was one of the inspirations for the film's post-apocalyptic world. (Note: Attributed to multiple sources:) Some online commentators have dubbed it "anime's answer to Dune". Miyazaki's imagination was sparked by the mercury poisoning of Minamata Bay and how nature responded and thrived in a poisoned environment, using it to create the polluted world depicted in the film. Kyle Anderson of Nerdist describes the film's setting as a steampunk post-apocalypse, while Philip Boyes of Eurogamer describes the technology in Nausicaä and Castle in the Sky as dieselpunk.

The most prominent themes in the film are centered around its anti-war and environmental focus. Nausicaä believes in the value of life, regardless of its form, and through her actions stops a war. Loy and Goodhew state there is no evil portrayed in the film, but the Buddhist roots of evil: greed, ill will and delusion. Fear is what drives the conflicts, the fear of the poisoned forest results in greed and resentment. Nausicaä, in addition to being a transformative force, leads people to understand and respect nature, which is portrayed as welcoming, spiritual, and restorative for those who enter it peacefully. Ian DeWeese-Boyd agrees, "Her commitment to love and understanding—even to the point of death—transforms the very nature of the conflict around her and begins to dispel the distorting visions that have brought it about."

== Releases ==
The film was released by Toei Company on 11 March 1984 on a double bill with a compilation film of the Italian-Japanese anime television series Sherlock Hound episodes "The Adventure of the Blue Carbuncle" and "Treasure Under the Sea". Upon the film's 1984 release, it received a recommendation from the World Wide Fund for Nature.

On home video, the film was released on VHS on 21 March 1984 and on Laserdisc on 25 April 1984 by Tokuma Shoten's "Animage Video" imprint.

On 30 July 1995, a subtitled version of the film was screened at the Institute of Contemporary Arts in London, as part of the "Building Bridges" film festival, marking the fiftieth anniversary of the atomic bombings of Hiroshima and Nagasaki.

Nausicaä was also included on the Ghibli ga Ippai: Studio Ghibli Complete LD Collection boxset, released by Tokuma Shoten in August 1996. The VHS was reissued as the third volume of Buena Vista Home Entertainment Japan's "Ghibli ga Ippai" imprint, on 19 September 1997.

Buena Vista released the film on three DVD sets, with a regular DVD and figure set released on 19 November 2003 and a collectors set following on 7 December 2003. By 2003, Nausicaä had sold 1.77 million VHS and DVD units in Japan. Walt Disney Studios Japan released the film on Blu-ray on 14 July 2010.

=== Warriors of the Wind ===
In advance of the film's Japanese release, Tokuma Shoten sold the film's foreign sales rights to World Film Corporation, who pre-sold the global distribution rights in turn to Manson International. Manson commissioned ADR producer Riley Jackson's Showmen, Inc. to produce an English-dubbed adaptation supervised by screenwriter David Schmoeller, titled Warriors of the Wind, which was released theatrically in the United States by New World Pictures beginning on 14 June 1985 in Florida. It was followed by a VHS release in November 1985. In 1986, Vestron Video would release the film in the UK and First Independent Video would re-release it again in 1993. The film was heavily cut by approximately 22 minutes compared to the 117-minute Japanese version to give it a faster pace, and the voice actors were not credited. The film received a PG rating, as did Disney's later English dub. Consequently, part of the film's narrative depth was lost: some of the environmentalist themes were simplified as was the main subplot of the Ohm, omitting Nausicaä's childhood connection to them. Most of the characters' names were changed, including the titular character, who became Princess Zandra. The United States poster and VHS cover featured unusual depictions of the film's characters, as well as some who are not in the film, riding the resurrected Giant Warrior—including a still-living Warrior shown briefly in a flashback.

Unsatisfied with Warriors of the Wind, Miyazaki eventually adopted a strict "no-edits" clause for further foreign releases of his and the company's films. Warriors of the Wind also prompted Miyazaki to allow translator Toren Smith of Studio Proteus to create a faithful translation of the Nausicaä manga for Viz Media.

=== English re-releases ===
On 18 October 2003, Cindy and Donald Hewitt, the scriptwriters of The Walt Disney Studios' English dubs of Spirited Away and Porco Rosso, announced that a more faithful English version of Nausicaä was in pre-production at Disney, and that Patrick Stewart and Uma Thurman had been cast. Natalie Portman was originally intended to voice Nausicaä, but Alison Lohman was eventually cast in the role. The dub was directed by Disney executive Rick Dempsey.

Nausicaä was released on DVD by Buena Vista Home Entertainment on 22 February 2005, for Region 1. This DVD includes both Disney's English dub and the Japanese audio track with English subtitles. Optimum Home Entertainment released the film in Region 2 and the Region 4 DVD is distributed by Madman Entertainment. A remastered Blu-ray sourced from a 6K filmscan was released on 14 July 2010 in Japan. It includes an uncompressed Japanese LPCM stereo track, the Disney-produced English dub, and English subtitles. On 18 October 2010, a Blu-ray version was released in Region B by Optimum Home Entertainment. The film was released on Blu-ray in the United States and Canada on 8 March 2011, by Walt Disney Studios Home Entertainment. The Blu-ray version earned $334,473 in retail sales during its first week of release in the United States. GKIDS and Shout! Factory re-issued the film on Blu-ray and DVD on 31 October 2017, along with Castle in the Sky. A limited edition steelbook release of the film's DVD and Blu-ray versions was released in the United States on 25 August 2020.

=== Other language releases ===
In Spain, the edited 95-minute long Manson International version, called Guerreros del Viento ('Warriors of the Wind'), was released on home video twice, with the first release in 1988 and the second in 1991, followed by the original uncut film under the title Nausicaä del Valle del Viento in 2010. France had both versions of the movie released, with two releases of the Manson version titled La Princesse des Étoiles ('The Princess of the Stars') and Le vaisseau fantôme ('The Ghost Ship'), while the uncut film had a regular and collector's DVD set release on 18 April 2007. In Germany UFA released the Manson version on VHS as Sternenkrieger ('Star Warriors') in 1986 and Universum Anime released the uncut DVD release on 5 September 2005. The 2007 Hungarian DVD release, titled Nauszika – A szél harcosai ('Nausicaä – The Warriors of the Wind') is uncut despite the title's reference. The Korean DVD release of the uncut film was on 3 March 2004. China has had three releases of Nausicaä: the first on Video CD and two DVD releases. In Italy the film, titled Nausica nella Valle del vento ('Nausicaä in the Valley of the Wind'), was first aired uncut on Rai 1 on 6 January 1987 with a first dub, but this version was re-aired only a few times and then never officially published; a planned DVD release around 2003 by Buena Vista Italia was eventually cancelled. Nausicaä had a theatrical distribution and a DVD release with a new dub by Lucky Red in 2015.

== Reception ==
=== Box office ===
In Japan, the film grossed about ¥1.48 billion ($6.23 million) at the box office, earning ¥742 million in distributor rental income. Its 2020 re-release in Japan would increase its gross by $6,393,174. Overseas, the film grossed $1,720,214 from theatrical releases in seven countries between 2006 and 2017, including $1,521,343 in France alone.

In terms of box office admissions, the film sold 914,767 tickets in Japan up until 2006 and 342,235 tickets in Europe.

=== Critical reception ===
Nausicaä of the Valley of the Wind received critical acclaim. The film has been ranked among the best animated films ever made, and is seen by critics as a seminal influence on the development of anime, as the film's success led to the founding of Studio Ghibli and several other anime studios. In a contemporary review of the initial American release, Terry Lawson of Dayton Daily News applauded the film for its character designs and allegorical themes, as well as Hayao Miyazaki's direction and Joe Hisaishi's score. Theron Martin of Anime News Network praised the film for largely the same reasons. He also said that the film "deserves a place on any short list of all-time classic anime movies." Common Sense Media, which serves to inform parents about media for children, rated the film positively and cited its good role models and positive messages, but also cautioned parents about its dramatic setting and violent scenes. On the review aggregator website Rotten Tomatoes, 87% of 23 critics' reviews are positive, with an average rating of 8/10. At Metacritic, the film has a weighted average score of 86 out of 100 based on 7 critics, indicating "universal acclaim". Helen McCarthy in 500 Essential Anime Movies praised the animation techniques of Miyazaki, stating that "the real strength of this film is the script, packed with incident, excitement and passion, and the soundtrack" by Joe Hisaishi.

Sega's Yukio Futatsugi has cited the film as an inspiration for his 1995 rail shooter Panzer Dragoon, as he was an avid fan of Miyazaki's work. Numerous games have used Ohm-like creatures assumed to be references to the film, including Metal Slug 3, Cyber Core, and Viewpoint. The game Crystalis, known in Japan as God Slayer: Haruka Tenkū no Sonata (ゴッド・スレイヤー はるか天空のソナタ), shares common elements with the film, including an insect that resembles an Ohm. Megan Peters of Comic Book Resources identified multiple elements in Star Wars: The Force Awakens (2015) that bore resemblance to Nausicaä, including the lead character Rey.

Manga author Katsura Hoshino regards it as her favorite anime film, having watched it many times when she was young. In 2001, the Japanese magazine Animage elected Nausicaä of the Valley of the Wind the 43rd best anime production of all time. In a poll conducted by Japan's Agency for Cultural Affairs at the 2006 Japan Media Arts Festival, the film was rated the second-best animation of all time, after Neon Genesis Evangelion. The film was named 2nd Greatest Japanese Animated Film of All Time by Japanese film magazine Kinema Junpo in 2009.

== Gliders ==
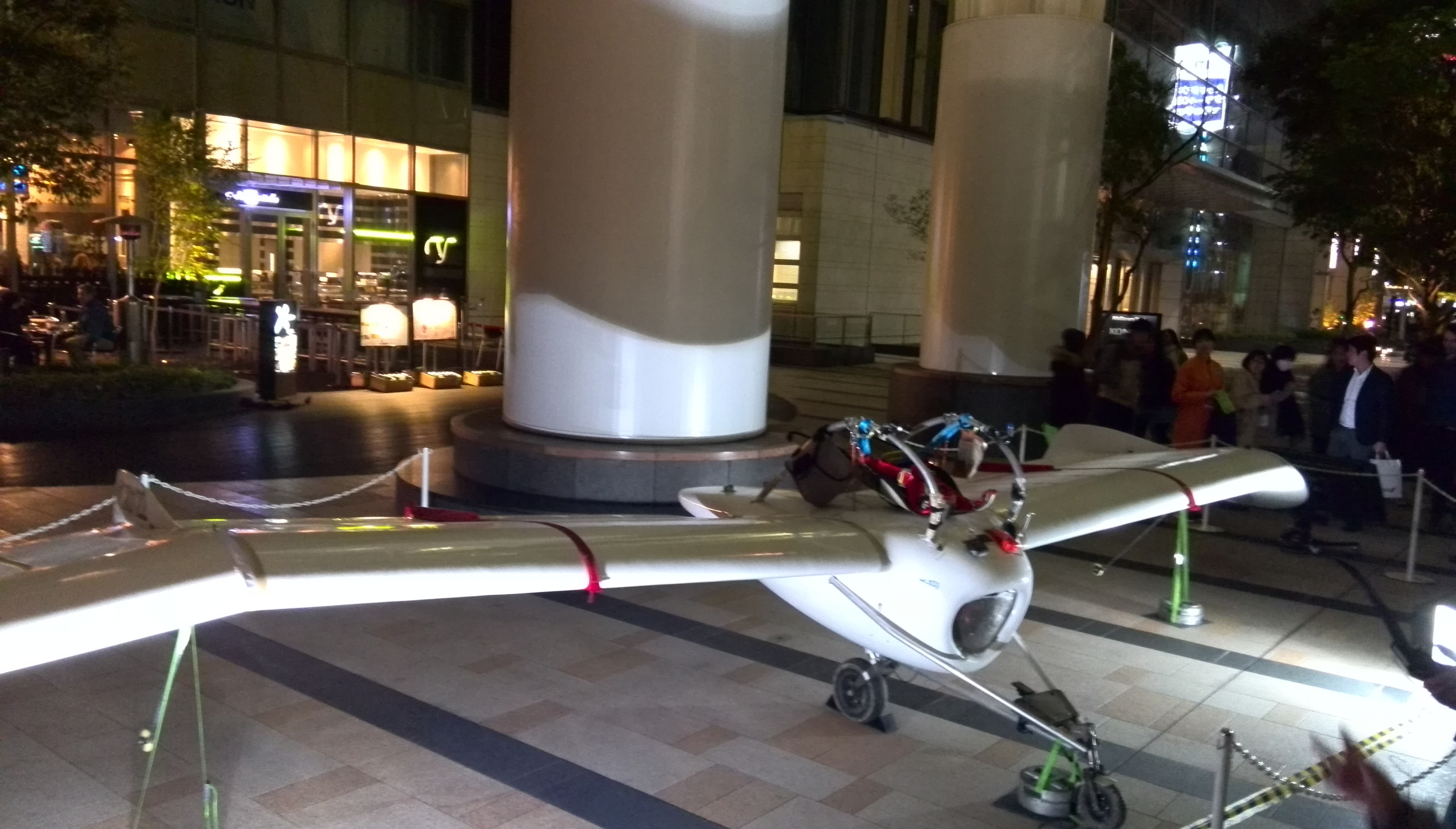
A functional M-02J jet-powered Möwe Glider replica which has actually flown a few hundred meters

Various gliders are seen in the film and the protagonist, Nausicaä, uses a jet-assisted one-person glider-shaped machine with folding wings. According to the accompanying film book released in Japan, the glider is called Möwe (メーヴェ, Mēve; or "mehve" in the English manga), the German word meaning gull. An official scale model lists it as having an approximate wingspan of 5.8 meters (1:20 model measured to be 29 cm), while the design notes indicate it has a mass of only 12 kg. In 2004, the Japanese-led OpenSky Aircraft Project began attempts to build a real-life, working personal jet glider based on the glider from the film. Two full-size gliders with no power source carrying the code name M01 and M02, with a half-sized jet-powered remote-controlled mock-up named moewe 1/2, were built. The designer and tester of the project emphasized that the project was not affiliated with Studio Ghibli and Hayao Miyazaki, noting that he did not want to cause trouble for them if an accident occurred. A jet-powered version (registration number JX0122) was finally able to take off under its own power for the first time on 3 September 2013.

== Soundtracks ==
Nausicaä of the Valley of the Wind

Soundtrack album by Joe Hisaishi
- Released: 1984
- Recorded: 1983
- Genre: Soundtrack
- Length: 39 minutes
- Labels: Studio Ghibli, Animage, Wasabi Records, Tokuma Japan Communications, Synnara Music, Nippon Columbia, Apollon
- Producers: Masaru Arakawa (uncredited); Joe Hisaishi (uncredited)

Joe Hisaishi chronology
Information (1982)	Nausicaä of the Valley of the Wind (1984)	W's Tragedy (1984)

The film's score was composed by Joe Hisaishi, while the titular theme song "Kaze no Tani no Naushika" was written by Takashi Matsumoto, composed by Haruomi Hosono and sung by Narumi Yasuda. The song "Nausicaä's Requiem" was performed by then-four-year-old Mai Fujisawa, Hisaishi's daughter. Numerous soundtracks and albums relating to the film have been released.

List of soundtrack releases
Release date	English title	Japanese title
25 November 1983	Nausicaä of the Valley of Wind: Image Album – Bird Person	風の谷のナウシカ イメージアルバム 鳥の人
25 February 1984	Nausicaä of the Valley of Wind: Symphony – The Legend of Wind	風の谷のナウシカ シンフォニー 風の伝説
25 March 1984	Nausicaä of the Valley of Wind: Soundtrack – Towards the Faraway Land	風の谷のナウシカ サウンドトラック はるかな地へ
25 April 1984	Nausicaä of the Valley of Wind: Drama Version – God of Wind	風の谷のナウシカ・ドラマ編
25 November 1986	Nausicaä of the Valley of Wind: Best Collection	風の谷のナウシカ BEST
25 October 1989	Nausicaä of the Valley of Wind: Hi-tech Series	風の谷のナウシカ・ハイテックシリーズ
15 March 1992	Nausicaä of the Valley of Wind: Piano Solo Album <For the Easy Use with Beyer>	

== Other media ==
=== Manga ===
Miyazaki's original manga version of Nausicaä was written over a period of 12 years, with breaks taken to work on Studio Ghibli films. Serialized in Tokuma Shoten's Animage magazine, the first chapter was published in February 1982 and the last chapter in March 1994. Miyazaki adapted and altered the work for the film because only sixteen chapters of the manga were written at the time of the film's production. The manga would continue to be produced until the seventh and final book was released on 15 January 1995. The English localization was initially done by Toren Smith and Dana Lewis of Studio Proteus. After Miyazaki resumed production of the manga, Viz Media chose a new translation team and continued to release the rest of manga.

=== Video games ===
Three video games were released based on the manga and the film, all of which were developed and published by Technopolis Soft and released in 1984 on popular Japanese computer systems. The first game, Nausicaä's Close Call, also known as Nausicaä in the Nick of Time, (ナウシカ危機一髪, Naushika Kiki Ippatsu) is a Japanese shoot 'em up video game developed and published by Technopolis Soft for the NEC PC-6001. The second game, Nausicaä of the Valley of the Wind and known by its title screen as Nausicaä Adventure Game (風の谷のナウシカ, Kaze no Tani no Naushika), is an adventure game developed by Technopolis Soft for the NEC PC-8801. The third game, Never Forget to Nausicaä Game Forever (忘れじのナウシカ・ゲーム, Wasure ji no Naushika Gemu) for the MSX is the most well-known of the releases and has been frequently and erroneously referred to as a game where the player kills the Ohmu. These games signaled the end of video game adaptations for Hayao Miyazaki's films. The only other games based on Miyazaki films were the LaserDisc arcade game Cliff Hanger and the MSX2 platform-adventure game Lupin III: The Castle of Cagliostro, both of which were based on The Castle of Cagliostro. Luke Plunkett describes these "two awful adaptations" as the reason Miyazaki does not allow further video game adaptations of his films.

=== Other ===
An art book for the film, The Art of Nausicaä of the Valley of the Wind: Watercolor Impressions (ジアート風の谷のナウシカ宮崎駿水彩画集, Jiato Kaze no Tani no Naushika Miyazaki Shun Suisai Gashū), was released in 1996. Written and illustrated by Hayao Miyazaki, it contains the original watercolor illustrations that were concept sketches used by the manga and the film. Tokuma Shoten first released the artbook on 31 July 1996. The artbook was licensed for a North American release by Viz Media, which released the book on 6 November 2007. It was also licensed in Australasia by Madman Entertainment and in France by Glénat. In 2001, the Nausicaä storyboards were re-released, bundled into a single, larger, volume as part 1 of the Studio Ghibli Story boards collection.

A selection of layout designs for the film was also incorporated in the Studio Ghibli Layout Designs exhibition tour, which started in the Museum of Contemporary Art Tokyo (28 July 2008 to 28 September 2008) and subsequently travelled to different museums around Japan and Asia, concluding in the Fukuoka Asian Art Museum (12 October 2013 to 26 January 2014). The exhibition catalogues contain annotated reproductions of the displayed artwork. Tokuma Shoten released a film comic, in four volumes, one each week from 20 November 1990 to 20 December 1990. A two-volume children's version was released on 31 March 1998.

Giant God Warrior Appears in Tokyo, a live-action short film that serves as an alternate retelling of the Seven Days of Fire, was released in 2012. A kabuki play adaptation, covering the events of the movie, was performed in December 2019.
