= List of Nausicaä of the Valley of the Wind characters =

Nausicaä of the Valley of the Wind is a manga series created by Hayao Miyazaki, between 1981 and 1994, featuring an extensive cast of characters. The series takes place on a post-apocalyptic Earth where environmental disasters threaten the survival of humankind. Nausicaä, the titular protagonist of the series, is a princess of the Valley of the Wind, who explores the ecological system of her world and becomes involved in a war between kingdoms. Nausicaä's objective is to bring about a peaceful coexistence among the people of her world, as well as between humanity and nature.

In 1984 Miyazaki's film of the same title was released. At the time only 16 chapters of the manga had been published. Miyazaki had not written an ending for the manga and not all the characters had been created yet. Characters from the manga were adapted for the screen and new characters were created who appear exclusively in the film.

== Human characters ==
=== Valley of the Wind ===
Valley of the Wind (風の谷, Kaze no Tani)

==== Nausicaä ====
Nausicaä (ナウシカ, Naushika)
The protagonist of the film is Nausicaä, the Princess of the Valley of the Wind. As a courageous and caring person, she has a special connection with animals and the natural world. From a young age, she explores the ecosystem of her world and also develops a skilled ability to fly on her glider. Because of her exploration of the toxic jungle's flora and fauna and her scientific experiments with the samples she brings back to her laboratory, she comes to the conclusion that the ecosystem of their world is misunderstood by most of the people who inhabit it. Nausicaä sees war as pointless, but accepts the responsibilities she has towards her people and their allies, responsibilities that increase as her father's condition deteriorates. Her ultimate responsibility is towards the world as a whole and her actions transcend the narrow scope of tribal politics and warfare in which she becomes embroiled. Throughout most of the story, she is portrayed as a young adult, but there are flashbacks to her earlier childhood.

Voice cast: Sumi Shimamoto was the character's Japanese voice actor in the 1984 animated film adaptation of Nausicaä. For the 2005 English dub, released by Buena Vista, Alison Lohman performed the role.

Reito Adachi observes that the name of the 'Nausicaä' character was changed, to the more English sounding, "Zandra" for the simplified and cut New World Pictures release of the film, titled Warriors of the Wind (1985).

==== Jihl ====
Jihl (ジル, Jiru)
Nausicaä's father. King of the Valley of the Wind. Shown as a bedridden old man throughout his appearances except in flashbacks. The manga and film differ in his ultimate fate. In the manga his death is attributed to long-term poisoning caused by the Sea of Corruption. In the movie he is killed during an invasion of the Valley of the Wind by Torumekian troops.

Voice cast: Mahito Tsujimura (Japanese), Mark Silverman (English, 2005)

==== Yupa Miralda ====
Yupa Miralda (ユパ・ミラルダ, Yupa Miraruda)
Also referred to as Master Yupa, or Lord Yupa. An explorer and the greatest swordsman in the Periphery. A mentor figure to Nausicaä, he travels with Asbel and Ketcha in the early parts of the story. In the manga he sacrifices himself protecting Kushana from the vengeful Mani Tribe in the final days of the war.

He is 45 years old.

Voice cast: Goro Naya (Japanese), Patrick Stewart (English, 2005)

==== Mito ====
Mito (ミト, Mito)
The sergeant-at-arms and King Jihl's chief retainer. His primary role is piloting the Valley's gunship in support of Nausicaä's mission.

Voice cast: Ichirō Nagai (Japanese), Edward James Olmos (English, 2005)

==== Tepa ====
Tepa (テパ, Tepa)
A young wind-rider who attempts to fill Nausicaä's role back in the Valley after she leaves.

==== Gram/Matriarch ====
Oh-baba (大ババ, Ōbaba)
The oldest and most prominent of the Valley's "wise women". In the anime, she is the first to realize Nausicaa to be the "Blue-Clad One" of prophecy; in the manga, the Dorok Mani-tribe Elder is the first one to acknowledge this.

Voice cast: Hisako Kyōda (Japanese), Tress MacNeille (English, 2005)

=== Pejite ===
Pejite-city (ペジテ市, pejite-shi)

==== Asbel ====
Asbel (アスベル, asberu)
Prince of Pejite, forced to journey in exile after Princess Kushana invades Pejite. He becomes Nausicaä's and later Yupa's, friend and ally throughout the manga.

Voice cast: Yōji Matsuda (Japanese), Shia LaBeouf (English, 2005)

==== Lastelle (Rastel) ====
Rastel (ラステル, Rasteru)
Princess of Pejite and Asbel's twin sister. Dies shortly after being rescued by Nausicaä from a wrecked Pejite airship that escaped Kushana's invasion in the manga; in the anime, it's a Torumekian airship on which she was imprisoned.

Voice cast: Miina Tominaga (Japanese), Emily Bauer (English, 2005)

=== Torumekia ===
Torumekia (トルメキア, Ttorumekia)

==== Kushana ====
Kushana (クシャナ, Kushana)
Princess of Torumekia. She cares deeply for the men under her command and commands their unwavering loyalty, but is portrayed as brutal and harsh to her enemies.

Hideaki Anno, who worked on the Nausicaä film, had planned to do a manga side-story centered around Kushana's military exploits, but Miyazaki denied him access, believing that Anno was intending to use her to "play war games".

Kushana has been noted as a complex antagonist. Susan J. Napier and Patrick Drazen note a parallel between the character of Kushana, the rival warrior princess, and that of Nausicaä - Napier describes Kushana as Nausicaä's "shadow", noting that Kushana is not shown with any "alleviating, 'feminine' virtues" as Nausicaä is, but that they share the same tactical brilliance. Drazen describes this as a "feminine duality". Miyazaki has described the two characters as being "two sides of the same coin", but Kushana has "deep, physical wounds".

Voice cast: Yoshiko Sakakibara (Japanese), Uma Thurman (English, 2005)

The name of the Kushana character was changed, to the more English sounding, "Selina" for the simplified and cut New World Pictures release of the film, titled Warriors of the Wind (1985).

==== Kurotowa ====
Kurotowa (クロトワ, Kurotowa)
Kushana's aide and a spy for the Emperor, at first. He switches allegiance to Kushana when he realizes the Emperor will probably kill him after he fulfills his usefulness. He was once a pilot and shows his flying skill when he evades Asbel's attack on the Torumekian fleet and shoots him down. Kurotowa prides himself in being a cynical survivor, but he also feels irresistibly attracted to the idealism and purity of spirit of Nausicaä.

Voice cast: Iemasa Kayumi (Japanese), Chris Sarandon (English, 2005)

==== The Emperor of Torumekia (the Vai Emperor) ====
Vai Emperor (ヴ王, vu ō)
Fearless, ruthless, as well as would even assassinate his own children should he perceive them to be a threat to his authority. After the Daikaisho he personally leads the remnants of the Tourmekian army to Shuwa in an attempt to take possession of the Crypt's secrets. He and Nausicaä confront the Master of the Crypt together and he sacrifices himself by taking the full force of the Crypt's last light himself to save Nausicaä. Before dying, he declares Kushana his successor, warning her not to make the same mistakes that he did, saying that killing even one treacherous noble will lead to a path of endless killing.

==== The Three Princes of Torumekia ====
Three princes (3皇子, 3 ōji)
The first prince dies when his airship is attacked by insects. The two other princes are shown to be similar to the first, but state that their behavior was an act to convince their father that they were stupid and therefore, not a threat. The two are content to stay with the Master of the Garden, away from politics and safe from war.

=== Dorok ===
Dorok (土鬼 / ドルク, Doruku)
This theocratic empire and its characters are exclusive to the manga and do not appear in the film. Throughout most of the story depicted in the manga, authority is divided between the hereditary ruling class and the priesthood.

Eriko Ogihara-Schuck identifies the Dorok as a religious group, not present in the anime, with a dualistic world view that parallels Christian apocalypticism. Ogihara Schuck writes that the Dorok are responsible for the creation of the Sea of Corruption in the manga, whereas the Sea of Corruption is attributed to pollution resulting from the Seven Days of Fire in the anime. She attributes Nausicaä's motivation for sealing the Crypt in Dorok holy city of Shuwa in the manga to a belief that humans should no longer selfishly attempt to control the natural world and on a more abstract level attributes Nausicaä's motivation to a desire to counter the Dorok's dualistic world view, a worldview which divides the world into purity and corruption, light and dark. Ogihara-Schuck observes that Nausicaa's thinking reflects Miyazaki's own world view and conforms to Miyazaki's expressed opposition to dividing the world into a good and evil dichotomy.

==== Kulubaluka ====
Kulubaluka (クルバルカ, Kurubaruka)
The family name of the dynasty of Dorok kings that ruled before being dethroned in a coup d'état by the first "Holy Emperor". Only mentioned in the story in textual references.

==== The Late, "First" Dorok Emperor ====
Name not revealed: once a pupil of the Master of the Garden, but departed with four Heedra to save the world, then usurped authority over the Dorok lands through a coup d'état. Originally a just and honest ruler, but eventually came to hate the peasants for their "incorrigible stupidity" and also apparently fell under the sway of the Master of the Crypt. Father of the two brothers Namulith and Miralupa upon whom he bestowed dual reign of the Dorok Empire. Died prior to the main events depicted in the manga, from a failed attempt to prolong his life. Appears as an illustrated character only in recollections of other characters and is mentioned retrospectively in dialogue.

==== Namulith/Namulis ====
Namulith (ナムリス, namurisu)
"The Emperor the Elder (皇兄, Kōkei)", Co-regent of the Holy Dorok Empire with Miralupa, his younger brother. He is charismatic and a warrior, but has none of his younger brother's psychic abilities. Namulith is over a century old, surviving by having his brain periodically transplanted into cloned bodies. Namulith assassinates Miralupa, usurps the authority of the priests and takes the title "Divine Emperor (神聖皇帝, shinseiKōtei)" when he assumes the sole reign of what remains of the Holy Dorok Empire. Namulith captures Kushana, hoping to marry her and thus claim the two empires. He eventually tires of life as he sees that everything seems to always go as the Master of the Crypt says they will and so passes on the burden of rule to Nausicaa after he is badly wounded by the attack of the God Warrior.

==== Miralupa ====
Miralupa (ミラルパ, Miralupa)
"The Emperor the Younger (皇弟, Kōtei)", Co-regent of the Holy Dorok Empire with Namulith, his elder brother. Miralupa's connection to the ruling Dorok theocracy and his psychic powers give him an edge in the early part of the series. Although he is the younger of the two, he appears much older than his brother because he still inhabits his original body, kept alive by painful life extension treatments. After a reversal of his and his brother's fortunes, Miralupa is assassinated by Namulith. His spirit is redeemed and saved by Nausicaä. He had repeatedly tried to destroy her, but her purity of spirit prevailed and she returned good for evil.

==== Chikuku ====
Chikuku (チクク, Chikuku)
A young boy with strong telepathy. He was the disciple and assistant of an elderly holy man. This mystical hermit, feeling the approach of his death, left Chikuku in Nausicaä's strong and capable hands. Chikuku becomes loyal to Nausicaa and fiercely protective of her. His weapon of choice is a blow gun that he uses to fire sharp darts. He uses his highly developed telepathy to help Nausicaä communicate with those with whom she does not share a common language. In volume 6, Chikuku rallies the Dorok people to disobey the Emperor Namulith and follow the path of Nausicaä instead. At this time he also reveals for the first time his true full name: Luwa Chikuku Kulubaluka, with Kulubaluka being the name of the emperor who reigned before Namulis's father staged a coup.

==== Charuka ====
Charuka (チヤルカ, Chiyaruka)
A Priest and commander of the Dorok armies. Though at first he fears the appearance of the "Blue-Clad One" as the prophesied warrior come to destroy Miralupa and the Dorok Empire, he later sees that Nausicaä is in reality a good person after she helps him attempt to destroy the engineered mold that was threatening to overwhelm the Dorok lands. Charuka then regrets and aids her during the rest of her journey and was willing to give up his life to save the Dorok people from the Emperor's tyranny. Charuka was saved by Nausicaä as he was about to be executed and later worked with Nausicaä and Chikuku to bring the survivors of the Daikaisho to safety. He valued the lives of the Dorok people above all else.

=== Mani tribe ===
==== Elder of the Mani tribe ====
Elder of the Mani Tribe (マニ族僧正, Mani zoku sōjō)
Makes the Ohmu attack Kushana's forces by using a captured, injured baby Ohmu. After Nausicaä stops the attack, he recognizes her as the "Blue-Clad One", a savior from old legends. Dies using his psychic powers to save Nausicaä from Miralupa, who considers the legends heresy.

==== Ketcha/Kecha ====
Ketcha (ケチャ, Kecha)
An interpreter from the Mani tribe who befriends Asbel and Yupa.

=== Forest People ===
People of the forest (森の人, mori no hito)

==== Selm ====
Selm (セルム, Serumu)
A man of the forest who helps Yupa, Asbel and Ketcha when they crash into the forest. He is with Nausicaä in spirit many times when she needs his guidance, including at the end when she confronts the Master of the Crypt. Yupa notices that he has the "same gaze as Nausicaa".

==== Ceraine ====
Ceraine (セライネ, Seraine)
Selm's sister.

=== Worm Handlers ===
Worm Handlers (蟲使い, mushitsukai)
A people who dwell on the fringes of the Sea of Corruption, domesticating the slug-worms and living as scavenger merchants and mercenaries. Generally viewed as disgusting and treated as outcasts and an "untouchable" race by all the other societies, they are also at first the only people who have had encounters with the Forest People, whom the Worm Handlers greatly respect and idolize. They are originally hired by both the Doroks and Torumekians as soldiers, but later come to view Nausicaä as their goddess and savior, accompanying her to the Crypt and protecting her during the final battle.

Miyazaki has said that he invented these people from the very start, to represent inequality and to explore the nobility of those whose existence may be abhorrent to the rest of society. He described them as being of the lowest caste but regrets not being able to explore them more deeply in spite of the length of the saga.

== Others ==
=== God Warriors ===
Giant God Warriors (巨神兵, Kyoshinhei)
Gargantuan biomechanical beings, Daniel Haas has referred to them as "man-made living weapons", considered to have been the primary instruments of destruction during the Seven Days of Fire. While the ceramic skeletons of God Warriors are a common sight across the landscape, the creatures are believed extinct at the beginning of the story. They have the ability to fly by "twisting space" and can fire devastating energy beams. These abilities are fueled by nuclear energy and contact with them is known to cause radiation poisoning, which suggests that the Seven Days of Fire may have been at least partially a nuclear holocaust. The characters of the manga refer to the radiation emitted by the God Warriors as "poisonous light." As later proven no conventional weapons work on them and all attempts to destroy them were futile.

==== Ohma ====
Ohma (オーマ, Ōma)
A God Warrior who is accidentally activated by those who find him. He is passed around while barely sentient until he is given to Nausicaä by Namulith. At first he has the mentality of a child or toddler. He assumes Nausicaä is his mother and sees confirmation of that assumption when she presents him with his missing core component. Nausicaä gives him the name Ohma, meaning innocence in the Eftal language. Nausicaä acts out the role of his mother, to control his destructive powers and to adjust his single minded perception of the divisions in the world. Soon afterwards Ohma starts deteriorating and rotting away until his death, although a reason is never given, it is assumed that it is due to his premature hatching and the continued use of his nuclear powers (The fire of heaven). Through their interactions Ohma's intelligence increases drastically and he begins to mature: discoursing about justice and how he was tasked with judging mankind. Together they travel to Shuwa where Nausicaä instructs him to deliver the final blow to the heart of the Crypt, once she discovers the nature of the entities in the Crypt and their designs for the future of the world. Ohma dies from the massive damage received while battling the crypt.

=== Master of the Garden ===
Master of the Garden (庭の主, niwa no nushi)
A mysterious entity tasked with preserving the knowledge of the ancient world within an isolated and concealed area referred to as "the Garden", an idyllic place containing plants and animals long extinct in the outside world and samples of literature, music, as well as advanced sciences. The Master, an engineered life-form who has lived for over a thousand years, cures Nausicaä of her radiation poisoning and reveals to her the plan of the previous civilization: to purify the Earth of toxins using the genetically engineered Sea of Corruption, then use the old sciences and creatures contained within the Garden to rebuild the world. Though he attempts to persuade Nausicaä to remain in the Garden, her will is very strong and he permits her to leave, saying that the door of the Garden will always be open for her should she ever choose to come back. Nausicaä gives him her name when she leaves, saying that he is cruel yet kind.

=== Heedra ===
Heedra (ヒドラ, hidora)
Powerful, biologically engineered creatures (possibly with biomechanical additions) from before the Seven Days of Fire. Used for menial tasks as well as artificial soldiers. While not capable of destruction on as vast a scale as the God Warriors, they are far more numerous and easier to maintain. Heedra are extremely strong and difficult to kill: they can only be killed by destroying their "core", apparently located in the head just behind the uppermost of their three eyes, or blasting a Heedra into pieces. The cloned bodies of the Dorok Holy Emperor and the Master of the Garden are also referred to as Heedra, suggesting the name may in fact be a catch-all term for genetically engineered humanoids.

=== Master of the Crypt ===
Master of the Crypt (墓所の主, bosho no nushi)
The man made, deitylike entity at the centre of the Crypt. Depository of the ancient society's technologies and science. Tasked with purifying the earth. Serving as an Ark for the old mankind which is to re-emerge once the purification is complete. Nausicaä rejects its designs for the future of the planet and with the assistance of the Vai Emperor and using Ohma's final strength, destroys it.

== Animals ==
=== Ohmu ===
Ohmu (王蟲, Ōmu)
Enormous creatures Miyazaki created by combining insects and other arthropods, which exist in a perpetual larval form until their lives end. They were created specifically to represent a new ecosystem for the story, simultaneously stimulating a sense of wonder and alienation. He chose their form in an effort to defy easy identification with existing life forms, to make it more difficult to discern their thoughts from their appearance and to resist empathy.

The Ohmu play a very important role in the story of Nausicaä. The Ohmu are greatly feared by many people in Nausicaä's world: though they are ordinarily docile, killing any insect while in the forest will drive any nearby Ohmu into a berserk rage, signified by their eyes changing to bright red as opposed to blue when they are calm. Due to their great size, they can destroy entire settlements in this state and the spores from forest plants which they scatter as they move can kill crops and render an area unsuitable for human life if left unchecked. However, the molted exoskeletons of the creatures are stronger than ceramics, capable of resisting most human weaponry and thus highly sought after as material for weapons, tools, as well as structures. The Ohmu possess a hive mind with which certain sensitive people may communicate. They also appear to have empathic powers as well: able to discern emotions through their tentacle feelers as they have done with Nausicaä herself. While most of the giant insects in the Sea of Corruption are driven by basic instinct, the Ohmu exhibit a greater level of intelligence.

Pronunciation: Ohm: /oʊm/. The Japanese name, (王蟲 (Ō mu(shi))), consists of the kanji for king and insect or bug. Transliterated as Ohmu in manga translations and as Ohm in the film's subtitles. The name has its origins in a mixture of the words for the king's worm, the sandworm from Dune, and Daijiro Morohoshi's Buddhist term ohm.

The creatures were renamed Gorgons for the Warriors of the Wind version of the film.

In the 1988 videogame Ghouls 'n Ghosts, the name (Ohme) and appearance of the boss after the fourth round clearly draw inspiration from the Ohmu.

=== Fox-squirrels ===
Fox-squirrels (キツネリス, kitsunerisu)
Small, catlike wild animals, generally considered impossible to domesticate. These creatures also make a brief cameo appearance in Castle in the Sky.

==== Teto ====
Teto (テト, Teto)
Nausicaä's fox-squirrel. Initially hostile. In the beginning of the manga and the film Nausicaä's gains his trust and loyalty through her connection with living things and he accepts and accompanies her on her various destinations. Late in the series of the manga she betrays this trust when she continues travelling towards Shuwa with Ohma, in spite of noticing the detrimental influence Ohma has on Teto's health. He dies from exposure to the radiation that God Warrior generates. She interrupts her journey to bury him and as a result encounters the Master of the Garden.

=== Horseclaws ===
Horseclaws (トリウマ, toriuma)
Large, flightless birds genetically engineered as replacements for horses, which are now entirely extinct in the world of Nausicäa. They are commonly used as beasts of burden and as riding animals. They were the inspiration for the making of chocobos of the Final Fantasy series.

==== Kai and Kui ====
Kai (カイ, kai) and Kui (クイ, kui)
A mated pair of horseclaws, originally belonging to Lord Yupa but given to Nausicäa to aid her on her journeys. Kai is killed saving Nausicäa, after which Kui lays their egg.

=== Kest ===
Kest (ケスト, kesuto)
An Ibex, chief assistant to the Master of the Garden and serves as Nausicaä's guide during her stay. He is very intelligent, able to converse with the Master and Nausicaä. After Nausicaä leaves, Kest follows after her to bring her leggings and Kushana's cape before returning to the Garden.

=== Slugworms ===
Slugworms (蟲, mushi)
Slugs the size of small dogs, adept at tracking by scent. The Wormhandler people derive their name from their practice of domesticating and using these creatures. While they appear harmless, they are considered unclean creatures by many non-Wormhandlers.
