= OpenSky M-02 =

Japanese project to create a personal jet-powered glider

M-02, M-02J
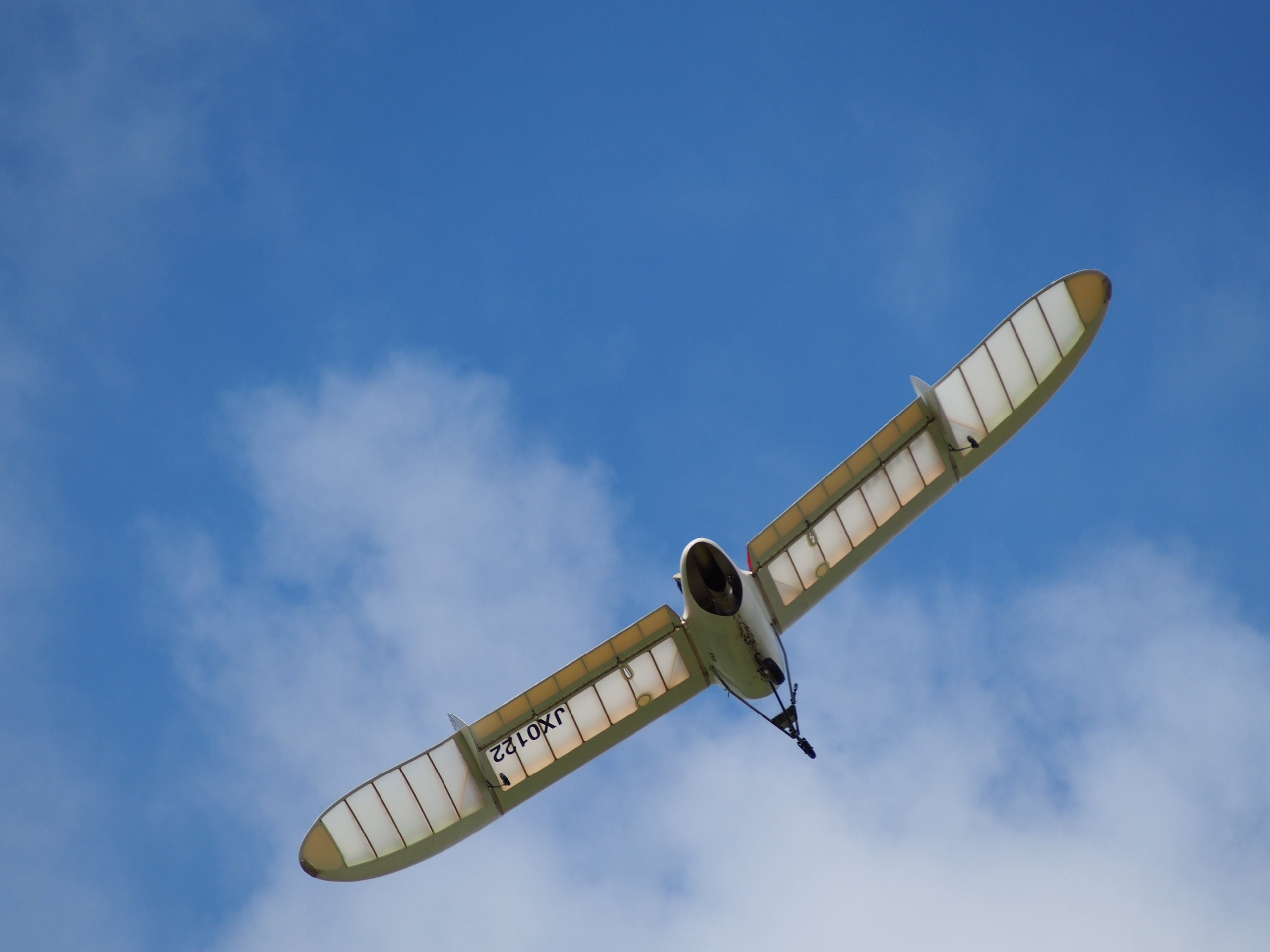
- M-02J in flight

General information
- Type: Experimental aircraft
- National origin: Japan
- Manufacturer: Aircraft Olympos
- Designer: Satoru Shinohe
- Status: Flying
- Primary user: Kazuhiko Hachiya
- Number built: 2

History
- First flight: 2006

The OpenSky M-02/M-02j is a Japanese primary glider/jet-powered motor glider inspired by the Möwe aircraft flown by the protagonist in the Hayao Miyazaki anime Nausicaä of the Valley of the Wind. It is a tail-less design intended to be powered on take off and climb for a duration of 10 minutes, then flown unpowered as a glider. As of June 2006, two aircraft prototypes have been constructed, and one has successfully completed a series of 10 unpowered test flights where it flew 98 meters and achieved an altitude of 4 meters after being tow-launched by a tensed elastic cable. The project is led by artist Kazuhiko Hachiya and design by Satoru Shinohe and manufactured by Aircraft Olympos. The Jet engine installed version, M-02J, had public demonstration flight in June 2016 at Takikawa, Hokkaido.

== Variants ==
- Möwe 1/2 (メーヴェ1/2) — sub-scale, radio-controlled development aircraft
- M-01 — unpowered development aircraft
- M-02 a total of 2 airframes of M-02 were built, 1 for preliminary gliding practice and 1 for installing Jet engine with no intention to mass-production. The glider version airframe is a collection of 21st Century Museum of Contemporary Art, Kanazawa since 2008.
  - M-02J (14 June 2007) Modified M-02 airframe has had a Jet engine installed. (14 April 2010) Vehicle M-02 has undergone high speed taxi tests at Fukushima Sky Park runway, in order to evaluate stability and acceleration. More details of the jet engine assembly are available, and the engine has a considerable separation from the walls of the engine pod, in order to permit better cooling and prevent the wood and composite airframe from encountering an excessive fire risk.

== Specifications (M-02 and M-02J) ==
Data from OpenSky website

General characteristics

- Crew: 1
- Capacity: 50 kg (110 lb) (M-02); 80 kg (176 lb) (M-02J)
- Length: 2.083 m (6 ft 10 in) (M-02); 2.670 m (8 ft 9.1 in)(M-02J)
- Wingspan: 9.636 m (31 ft 7.3 in)
- Height: 1.057 m (3 ft 6 in) (M-02); 1.360 m (4 ft 5.5 in)(M-02J)
- Wing area: 12.2 m^{2} (131.3 sq ft)
- Airfoil: high forward camber, reflexed
- Empty weight: 50 kg (110 lb) (M-02); 100 kg (220 lb) (M-02J)
- Gross weight: 105 kg (231 lb)
- Max takeoff weight: 115 kg (254 lb) (M-02); 180 kg (400 lb) (M-02J)
- Mean aerodynamic chord: 1287 mm (4.22 ft)
- Aspect ratio: 3.74 (quite low for a glider)
- L/D ratio: 10
- Fuel capacity: 18 L
- Powerplant: 1 × NIKE :AMT Netherlands (M-02J) , 0.78 kN (176 lbf) thrust

Performance

- Maximum speed: 70 km/h (43 mph, 38 kn) (M-02); 90 km/h (56 mph; 49 kn) (M-02J)
- Cruise speed: 60–80 km/h (37–50 mph, 32–43 kn) (M-02J)
- Stall speed: 36 km/h (22 mph, 19 kn) (M-02); 43 km/h (27 mph; 23 kn) (M-02J)
- Never exceed speed: 120 km/h (75 mph, 65 kn)
- Rate of climb: 2.5 m/s (490 ft/min) (M-02J)
- Wing loading: 8.6 kg/m^{2} (1.8 lb/sq ft)
- Thrust/weight: 0.36
