= Hideo Ogata =

Japanese magazine founder (1933–2007)

Hideo Ogata (尾形英夫, Ogata Hideo; (20 February 1933 – 25 January 2007)) was a producer and planner in Japan. He was also the founding editor of Animage magazine, the second largest anime and manga magazine in Japan, and the editor of the Nausicaä of the Valley of the Wind manga series. Ogata assisted in the founding of Studio Ghibli. Ogata died of stomach cancer on 25 January 2007 at the age of 73. Hayao Miyazaki read the eulogy at his funeral.

== Works ==
- Ajin Tenshi (planning)
- Angel's Egg (planning)
- Arion (producer)
- Battle Royal High School (planning)
- Big Wars (original creator)
- Castle in the Sky (planning)
- The Cockpit (development)
- Daimajū Gekitō: Kurogane no Oni (planning)
- Digital Devil Story: Megami Tensei (executive producer)
- Grey: Digital Target (cel checker)
- Kiki's Delivery Service (planning)
- Legend of the Galactic Heroes: My Conquest is the Sea of Stars (planning)
- Legend of the Galactic Heroes: Overture to a New War (planning)
- Majū Sensen (planning)
- My Neighbor Totoro (planning supervisor)
- Nausicaä of the Valley of the Wind (executive editor (manga), planning (anime))
- Ocean Waves (executive producer)
- Only Yesterday (planning)
- Pom Poko (associate executive producer)
- Porco Rosso (planning)
- Sengoku Majin Gōshōgun: Toki no Ihōjin (producer)
- Terebi Land (staff)
- Wild 7 (planning)
