= The Lady who Loved Insects =

Twelfth-century Japanese tale

"The Lady who Loved Insects" (虫めづる姫君, Mushi-mezuru Himegimi) is the twelfth-century Japanese tale of one who defies social convention and breaches the decorum expected of a Heian court lady. It is one of ten short stories in the collection Tsutsumi Chūnagon Monogatari.

== Story ==
The protagonist befriends insects, names her attendants after them, and engages in poetic exchanges involving furry caterpillars, leading to laughter on the part of others. Portrayed as even more eccentric is her disregard for her physical appearance, she leaves her hair untrimmed; has unplucked eyebrows; neglects to blacken her teeth; and allows herself to be seen by men. 'Oh, how regrettable! Why does she have such a weird mind'. When an incipient love affair comes to an end along with the tale it is of little surprise to any of the observers.

== Interpretation ==
Donald Keene has suggested that, while the reader may be attracted by her independence of mind, the author was probably trying to satirize those with eccentric behaviour and unconventional tastes. Robert Backus argues that the modern reader may prefer her independence and naturalness to the "excessive artificiality of the Heian conception of feminine beauty". He also draws parallels with the vernacular setsuwa tradition and anecdotes told of Fujiwara Munesuke, the bee-keeping minister, who gave his favourites names such as "Long Legs" (足高, Ashitaka), "Short Horns" (角短, Tsunomijika), and "Speckled Wings" (羽斑, Hanemadara). Michele Marra also refers to Fujiwara Munesuke, again linking the tale with setsuwa that similarly challenge court orthodoxy, and suggests that the story may see Buddhist truth preferred to the values of the Fujiwara aristocracy at the end of the Heian period.

== See also ==
- Setsuwa
- The Pillow Book
- The Tale of Genji
- Geisha (appearance)
- Nausicaä of the Valley of the Wind
