= Splitting of the Breast =

- Neon Genesis Evangelion episode
- The scene in which Shinji Ikari argues with another version of himself has been compared to Ultraman, Gundam and Sigmund Freud's psychoanalytic theory.
- Episode no.: Episode 16
- Directed by: Kazuya Tsurumaki
- Written by: Hideaki Anno, Hiroshi Yamaguchi
- Original air date: January 17, 1996
- Running time: 22 minutes

Episode chronology
← Previous "Those women longed for the touch of others' lips, and thus invited their kisses"	Next → "Fourth Children"

"Splitting of the Breast" (Note: Japanese: 死に至る病、そして, Hepburn: Shi ni itaru yamai, soshite; lit. 'The sickness unto death, and then...') is the sixteenth episode of the Japanese anime television series Neon Genesis Evangelion, which was created by animation studio Gainax. The episode was written by Hideaki Anno and Hiroshi Yamaguchi, and directed by Kazuya Tsurumaki. The series' protagonist is Shinji Ikari, a teenage boy whose father Gendo recruits him to the special military organization Nerv to pilot a gigantic biomechanical mecha named Evangelion into combat against beings called Angels. In the episode, Shinji is absorbed into an Angel called Leliel in a space of imaginary numbers called the Dirac sea. Shinji has a vision in which he sees another version of himself as a child and discusses his lifestyle.

To write "Splitting of the Breast", the staff writers merged the ideas originally planned for a trilogy of episodes with the same theme. The episode contains several references to other Japanese television shows, such as Ultraman and Gundam, and to psychoanalysis. The title refers to Melanie Klein's psychological concept of splitting, while the episode's Japanese title is a reference to Søren Kierkegaard's work The Sickness unto Death.

"Splitting of the Breast" was first broadcast on TV Tokyo on January 17, 1996, and drew a 9.4% share of the national television audience. Animage readers voted the episode among the best anime installments of 1996, and Gainax has released merchandise based on it. Critics positively received "Splitting of the Breast" for its symbolism, Leliel's attack, its animation, and its moments of introspection.

== Plot ==
Shinji Ikari and Asuka Soryu Langley, two fellow pilots of the Evangelion mecha units, continue their domestic lives at the home of Misato Katsuragi, their superior at the paramilitary agency Nerv. Asuka accuses Shinji of being too self-nihilistic. Meanwhile, Shinji beats Asuka in a test with the Evas, and Misato praises him. Leliel, the twelfth in a series of enemies called Angels, appears as a floating sphere in the skies of Tokyo-3 city. Asuka's pride is wounded by Shinji's achievement and provokes him; Shinji decides to attack the enemy alone, but is absorbed with his Evangelion Unit-01 into its shadow.

Ritsuko Akagi, head of Nerv's scientific department, determines that Leliel exists on a higher dimension of existence, which can only be explained using abstract mathematical concepts. The Angel's shadow on the ground is its actual body, while the sphere in the sky is its true shadow. Nerv prepares a recovery strategy for Eva-01. Shinji, who is suspended between life and death in a space called the Dirac sea, has a vision in which he argues with a younger version of himself on a train. During a stream of consciousness, he feels the presence of his mother, who died years earlier in a mysterious accident. Before the recovery operation begins, Eva-01 violently emerges under its own power from Leliel, much to the horror of the onlookers. Shinji is recovered alive and physically well in the aftermath but is somewhat unsettled by his experiences.

== Production ==
=== Genesis and staff ===
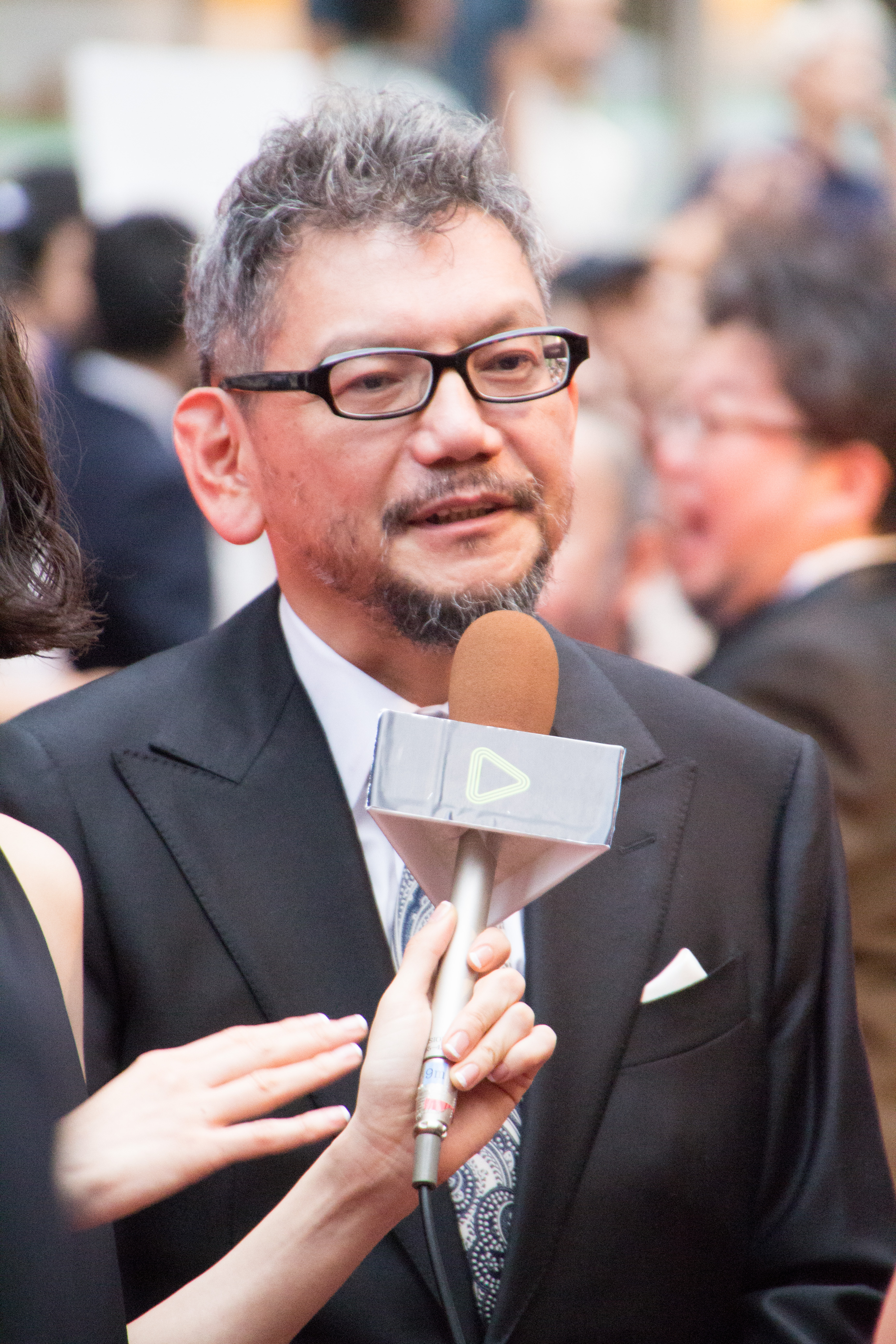
Neon Genesis Evangelion director Hideaki Anno

In 1993 Gainax wrote a presentation document for Neon Genesis Evangelion entitled New Century Evangelion (tentative name) Proposal (新世紀エヴァンゲリオン (仮) 企画書, Shinseiki Evangelion (kari) kikakusho) containing the initial synopses of the planned episodes. The Proposal document was then published in 1994. For the first twelve episodes aired, the company followed the proposal's schedule with only a few minor script differences. From the thirteenth episode onward, the production deviated from the writers' original plan and from the submission document. According to Michael House, translator for Gainax, Neon Genesis Evangelion's main director Hideaki Anno initially intended to give the story a happy ending, but he realized he had created problematic characters, so he changed his plans during production. According to Hiroki Azuma, a culture critic who interviewed Anno, during the airing of the series, Anno began to criticize obsessive anime fans, known as otaku, whom he considered closed-minded and introverted, and changed his original plans by creating a dramatic, introspective mid-series story.

Beginning with "Lilliputian Hitcher", the production ran into severe scheduling problems because of delays in episode delivery. Gainax had completed only twelve episodes by the time the series began airing after nearly two years of production, leaving the staff to produce the remaining fourteen in just six months—roughly one-third of the time they had spent on the first twelve. According to the series' staff, "Splitting of the Breast" also revives directing and storytelling techniques that Gainax had previously used in the thirty-seventh episode of Nadia: The Secret of Blue Water, "Emperor Neo". Midway through production, the episode underwent an almost complete overhaul in just two weeks. Pressed for time, Gainax repurposed existing footage and reshaped it through editing into an entirely different story; the studio thus followed the same approach on "Splitting of the Breast", using previously animated drawings and shots to tell a new story.

In the first draft, the fourteenth, fifteenth, and sixteenth episodes of the series would have constituted a trilogy with a common theme. The title "The Sickness Unto Death, and" (死に至る病、そして, Shi ni itaru yamai, soshite) was initially planned for the fourteenth episode, during which Shinji would have understood desperation and fear. In the following episode, Shinji would decide to pilot Eva-01 again after a recovery. In the sixteenth, initially called "In the heart of the enemy" (敵の心の中で, Teki no kokoro no naka de), Shinji would have been absorbed into an enemy, and there would have been a first attempt at communication between humans and Angels. The writers abandoned the original plans, and some of the ideas for the trilogy were later transferred and condensed into "Splitting of the Breast"; other ideas were transferred into the nineteenth episode "Introjection". Hideaki Anno and Hiroshi Yamaguchi wrote the screenplay, while Kazuya Tsurumaki produced the storyboards. Tsurumaki directed the episode and served as assistant character designer, with Masahiko Ohtsuka and Ken Ando as assistant directors. Shinya Hasegawa worked as the chief animator. Production involved studios other than Gainax, including Cosmos, Tokyo Photo Studio, and FAI International.

=== Development ===
"Splitting of the Breast" represents a turning point in the narrative of Neon Genesis Evangelion. According to academic Emily Wati Muir, the series, which initially presented as a children's anime, takes a "pivotal turn" after this episode, presenting explicit themes like sex and violence. Hiroki Azuma similarly noted the first half of the series unfolds like a normal mecha anime in which the characters are positively depicted, and the story seems to be moving toward a happy ending. The first part of the episode follows this traditional narrative line, but the second half presents an abrupt change of direction. According to academic Christophe Thuony, starting from "Splitting of the Breast", the series' grand narrative structure is destroyed in favor of a proliferation of small, character-based narratives; this process is "deployed through a liberation of a logic of quotation that gradually undermines the overarching narrative of salvation by producing a multitude of enigmas and an excess of information".

Director Anno's increased interest in psychology influenced the change of direction. During the writing of the fourteenth episode, "Weaving a Story", Anno decided to include an internal monologue of the character of Rei Ayanami, an introverted Evangelion pilot, for the first time, depicting her as a schizophrenic character, but feeling unlike the character he was stuck on and could not write the monologue. To help him, a friend of his gave him a magazine-like book on mental illness called Bessatsu Takarajima (別冊宝島), which included a poem written by a mentally ill person. Although he had attended a psychology course at university, Anno never seriously read psychoanalysis books; with Evangelion, he tried to talk about himself and find the words to express his emotions; Bessatsu Takarajima's book gave him a shock. After reading the book, he successfully wrote Rei's monologue, shifting the concept of the series toward introspection and trying to understand how the human mind works.

Evangelion Chronicle magazine compared Shinji's vision of his mother Yui to Mobile Suit Gundam

Production of "Splitting of the Breast" started before work on the fourteenth episode. The Leliel episode was originally intended to include a simple, traditional battle following the track established by the previous episodes "Magmadiver", "The Day Tokyo-3 Stood Still" and "She said, "Don't make others suffer for your personal hatred."". The production staff, however, decided to include an installment with an Angel that is more interested in humans than in their annihilation to avoid revealing the mysteries about the Angels' true nature. In the initial scenario, Leliel would select Japanese from the verses of some animals and several human languages so it could communicate with Shinji. Tsurumaki forbade the use of human language for the Angel, finding the idea "too anti-climactic" and "pulp fiction", and devised the final scenario, in which "Shinji converses with himself". Tsurumaki also suggested the dialogue between the two Shinji within Leliel's shadow, which was inspired by a dream he had.

For a scene depicting a battle against Leliel, the staff designed a gun similar to an Israeli Desert Eagle 50AE for the Eva-01. In the same sequence, the characters speak through holographic screens, a technique that was used in Gunbuster, a previous Gainax work. The design of Leliel was inspired by the artistic currents of surrealism and optical art. Japanese architect Yasutaka Yoshimura compared Leliel's design with Bridget Riley's work Fragment 5. Inside Leliel, Shinji has a vision of himself in a train; the train or station symbols have been previously used in the "Hedgehog's Dilemma" episode. Writer River Seager noted Anno showed an interest in trains since his short film At the Bus Stop (1980) and Mobile Suit Gundam: Char's Counterattack (1988); the symbol of the train then returns in Anno's next work, Love & Pop (1998). Seager argues that trains have fused the themes of death and modernity in Japanese media since Kenji Miyazawa's novel Night on the Galactic Railroad, which was adapted into an anime film by Gisaburō Sugii and possibly influenced Galaxy Express 999. Trains thus became a site of isolation, loneliness, and the desire to run away; however, in Anno's cinematography, train stations also offer the hope for growth and change. Writer Álvaro Arbonés also noted Anno's "tuned sense of editing" is on full display in the train scene; he linked this to the medium limitations, so Anno had to "maximize the dynamism of the editing".

The scene in which Shinji is trapped inside Leliel uses experimental animation techniques. The crew depicted Shinji's face distorted with a fisheye effect with a sunset in the background in the scene, a technique that Newtype magazine compared to Ultraman. Evangelion Chronicle magazine similarly compared the sequence of Shinji floating into space seeing his mother to Mobile Suit Gundam, in which the protagonist Amuro Ray and Lalah Sune are seen communicating while floating in a sea of stars. The voice of Shinji and the other Shinji, Leliel itself, is expressed through white lines that move on a black background, with only the voice of the voice actress in the background. Anno wanted to create images with just voices, with a minimum amount of visual information. According to him, since animation is made of graphic symbols and is a fiction, "a lie from the beginning", using rough drawings without using celluloid would have allowed him to destroy the stereotypes of people who think that only traditional celluloid animation can be considered a finished product. Tsurumaki originally took inspiration from a scene at the end of the Royal Space Force: The Wings of Honnêamise film (1987); he initially wanted to make a scene in which in the midst of a dizzying vortex of images all the people from Shinji's past memories spoke, but it was impossible to make it happen and Anno didn't like it. Anno, on the other hand, found the idea of using lines brilliant, since "no one had done something similar before".

The episode's original draft did not explain the imaginary-number space or the parallel universe inside Leliel, whose design originally featured a face rather than a floating sphere. During their argument, Misato would have asked Ritsuko whether she intended to trigger the Third Impact, to which Ritsuko would have replied by urging her to trust Commander Ikari. The draft also did not include the dialogue comparing the collection of pleasant things to a rosary. The final scenes explicitly foreshadowed that the Evangelions were more than simple robots and contained human souls. In the scene where Ritsuko asks Gendo whether the Evangelions might hate them, Gendo would have replied, "We'll understand when it awakens". In 2003, Gainax released a new edition of the series named Renewal. For the Renewal, staff used a telecine from the original 16mm film for all the episodes, but the 16mm negative for "Splitting of the Breast" was lost after the original airing, so Gainax used a lower-quality 35mm internegative for the Renewal and all subsequent home video releases.

=== Voice acting and soundtrack ===
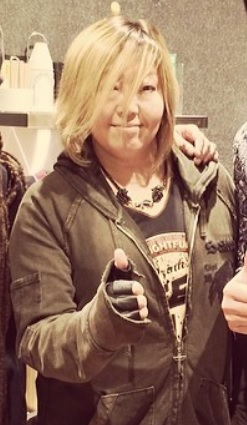
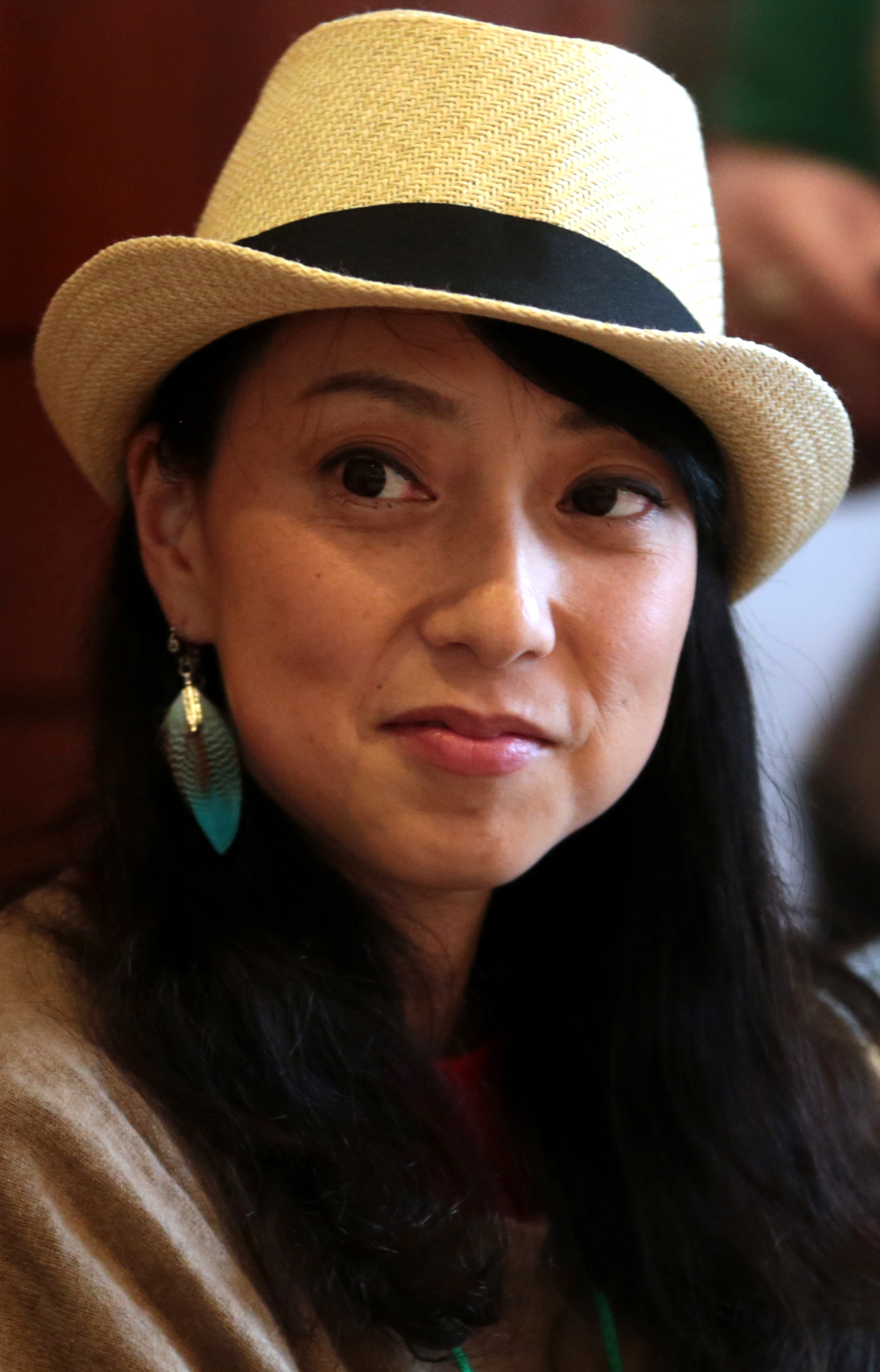
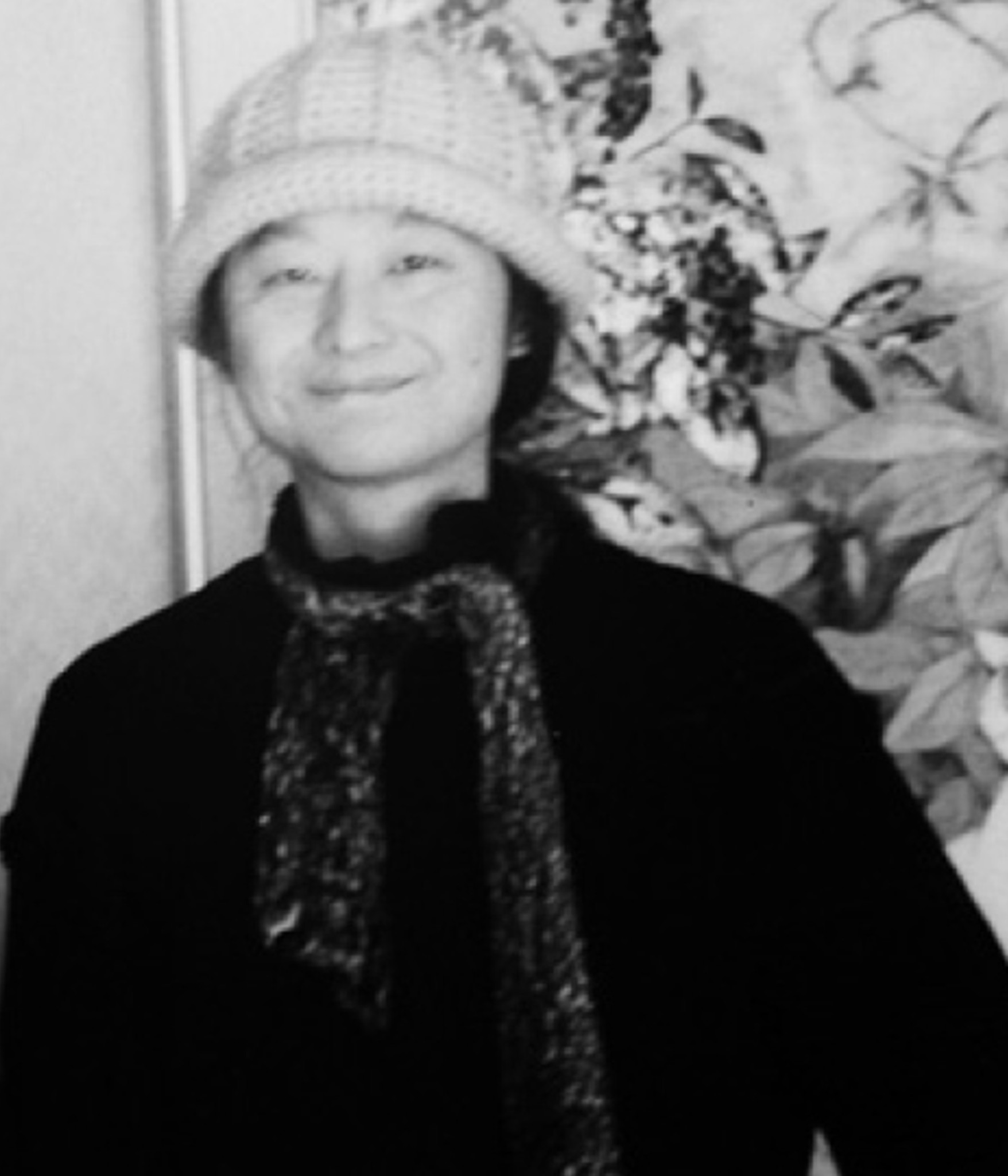
Megumi Ogata, Shinji's voice actress, stated that she felt pain recording "Splitting of the Breast". Yūko Miyamura, voice of Asuka, played unidentified background characters. The soundtrack, composed by Shirō Sagisu, has also been analyzed by anime critics.

Miki Nagasawa, Kotono Mitsuishi, Yūko Miyamura, Kōichi Nagano, Tetsuya Iwanaga, Takehito Koyasu, Megumi Hayashibara, and Fumihiko Tachiki, members of the series' primary voice staff, voiced several unidentified background characters in "Splitting of the Breast". Megumi Ogata, Shinji's voice actress, stated she felt pain while recording the episode, saying, "Anno is a sadist".

Shirō Sagisu composed the original soundtrack for "Splitting of the Breast" and the remainder of the series. The musical pieces "Misato", "Angel Attack", "Spending time in preparation", "Marking Time, Waiting for Death", "Borderline Case", and "Mother is the First Other" are used throughout the installment. "Borderline Case" and "Mother is the First Other" include a Bulgarian-style chorus that was created using a synthesizer. According to the official booklet of the album Refrain of Evangelion, "this song has a sense of uplifting warm feelings that represent a mother and a comfortable existence, but simultaneously it also brings out the realization of the independent entity of self". The piece "Marking Time, Waiting for Death" consists of two halves with different tones; the first has the "quiet tension" of a piano, while the second has a music-like sound from a fierce battle scene. "Spending time in preparation" is an alternative version of the song "Decisive Battle", used in previous episodes. "Decisive Battle" has been compared with the music from James Bond films, particularly that from "From Russia with Love" (1963).

Writer Masaki Miyakawa compared "Angel Attack" and "Decisive Battle" to the compositions of Japanese special effects tokusatsu films, such as Godzilla; "Angel Attack" has been compared to the soundtrack of Ryūichi Sakamoto's film The Last Emperor (1987), and the song "Kyūchi ni tatsu Gandamu" (窮地に立つガンダム; lit. 'Gundam in trouble') from Mobile Suit Gundam. According to Matthew Magnus Lundeen of Game Rant, the song "Angel Attack", which he likened to the theme of Jaws (1975), is based on the compositions of earlier tokusatsu series such as Ultraman and Kamen Rider. The track "Borderline Case", which is used in introspective scenes featuring Shinji, has been noted for its metaphysical tone and its ambient minimalist influence. According to the official booklet of Refrain of Evangelion, Misato's theme has an unusual tune compared to other music in the series; because Sagisu has composed music for the variety show Waratte iitomo!, "this type of music is also his cup of tea". Academic Heike Hoffer noted music from Evangelion reflects the psychology of the series' characters; according to Hoffer, Misato's theme has a "jazzy, laid-back sound", reflecting Misato's cheerful personality.

Bart Howard's song "Fly Me to the Moon" is used as the closing theme of "Splitting of the Breast". A version of the song named "Off Vocal TV Size Version" was used for the original broadcast and was later included in the album Neon Genesis Evangelion III. For the 2003 Renewal edition of the series, a new version of the song with a three-voice chorus consisting of Rei, Asuka, and Misato was used. The Renewal version used for "Splitting of the Breast" is an edited version of a track from the limited edition of the album Neon Genesis Evangelion Addition. This version is sung by Miyamura, Megumi Hayashibara, and Mitsuishi, and is also included on the Refrain of Evangelion album.

== Cultural references and themes ==
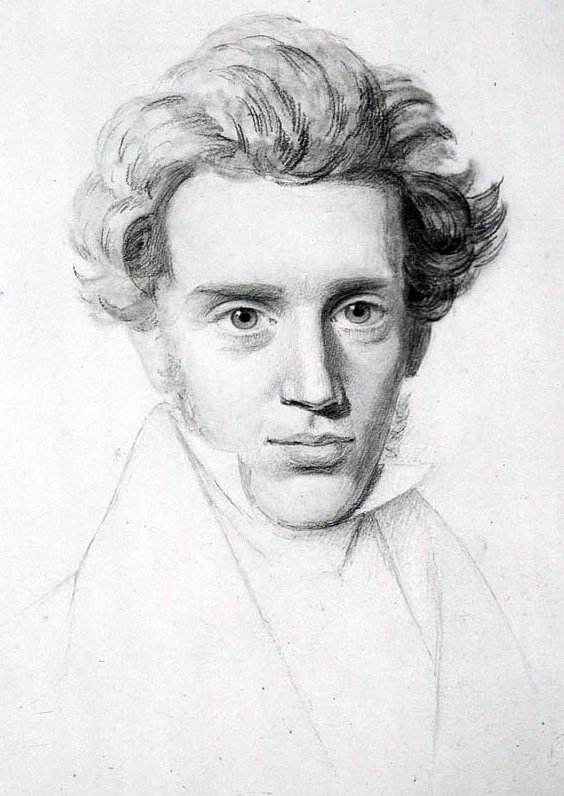
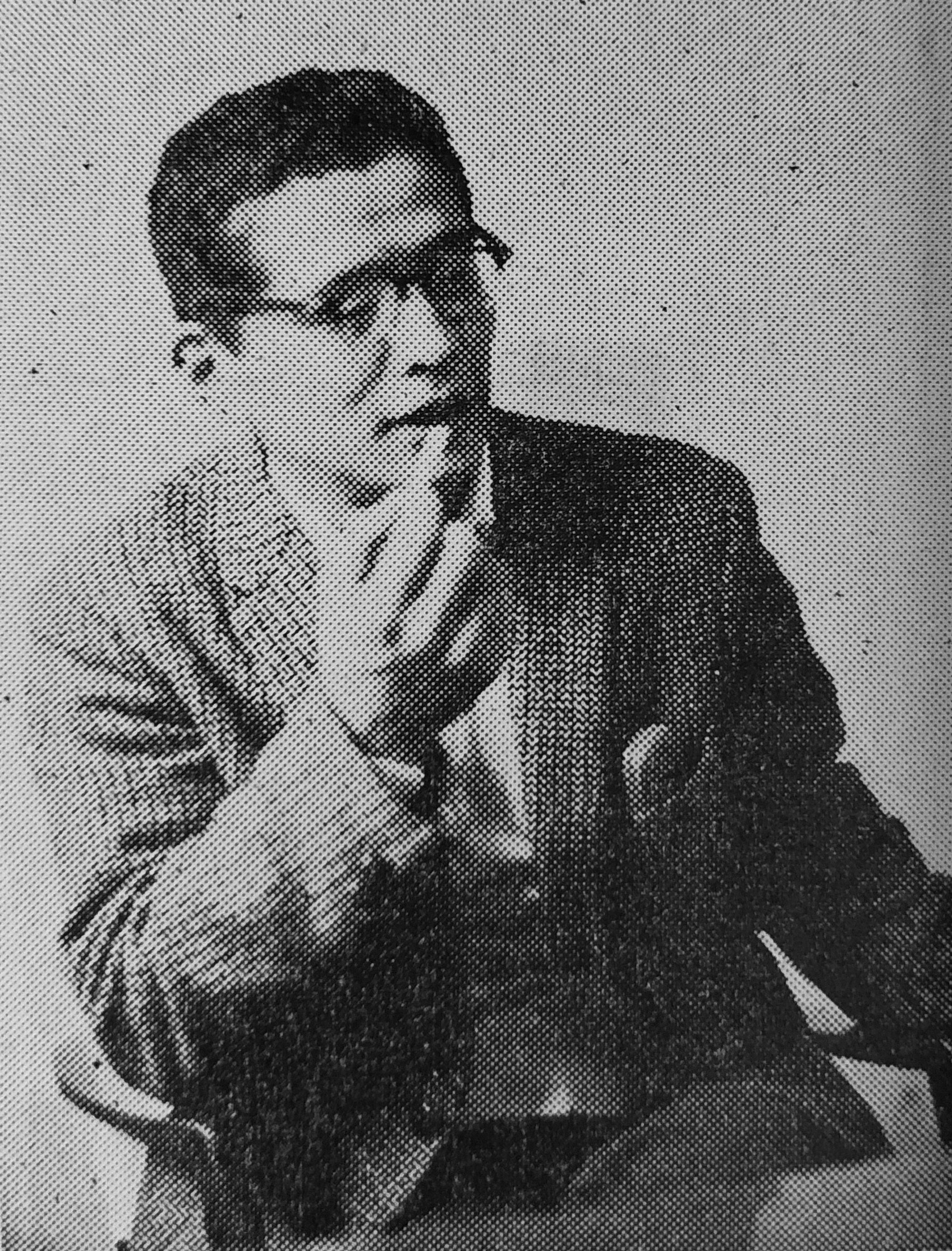
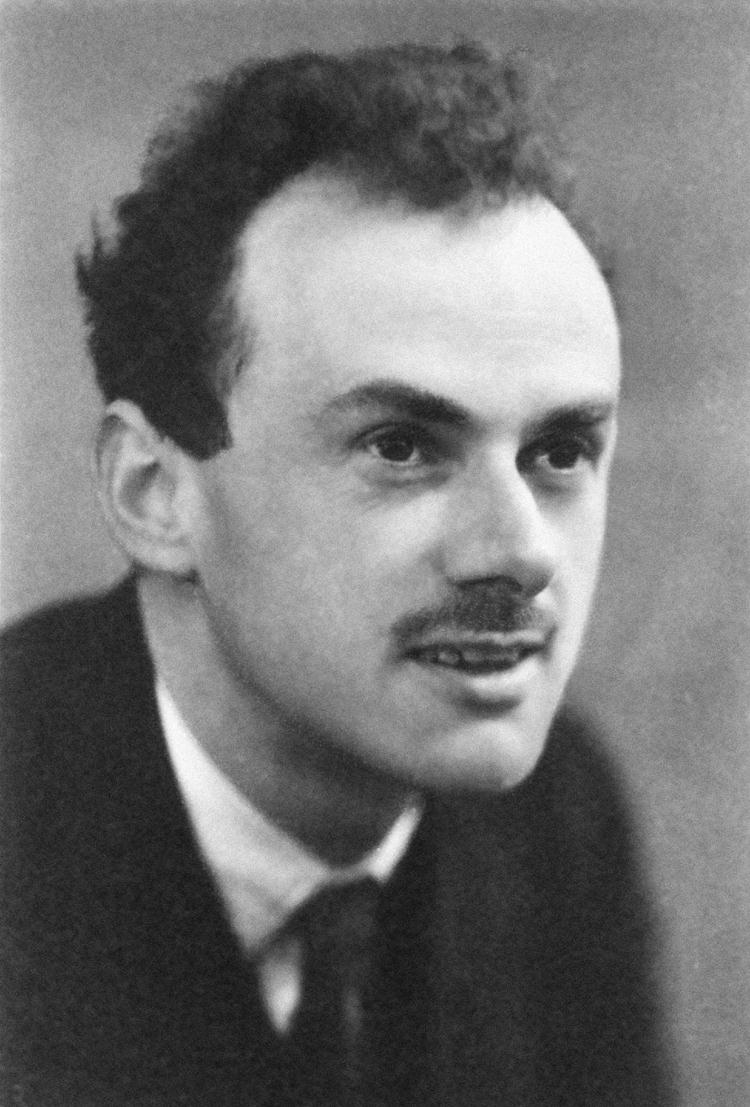
The Japanese title of the episode is a reference to Søren Kierkegaard's The Sickness unto Death. "Splitting of the Breast" also references Dirac sea, first proposed by Paul Dirac. Critics compared Evangelion Dirac's sea to Ryū Mitsuse's novel Ten Billion Days and One Hundred Billion Nights

"Splitting of the Breast" mentions several fictional, science-like terms in Shinji's stream of consciousness. Among these are "genome theory" and "crystallized genes"; according to this theory, which the series writers invented, clay and crystal are the principles of primitive vital activities. The episode also mentions the real term "biohazard". The "crystallized genes" theory has been linked to the clay crystals hypothesis proposed by Graham Cairns-Smith about the origin of life, while the term "biohazard" to The Andromeda Strain by Michael Crichton and Blood Music by Greg Bear, whose plots involve scenarios of pathogen beings threatening the existence of the human race.

The parallel dimension of imaginary numbers contained within Leliel, called the Dirac sea, is a reference to a concept physicist Paul Dirac formulated; according to Dirac, rather than being truly empty, the void is a sea of particles of negative energy. Dirac's research led to the formulation of the concept of antimatter, which is composed of particles with opposite charges to those of matter; the collision of particles and antiparticles leads to annihilation and theoretically the vacuum. Because Shinji is made up of matter and Leliel is made up of antimatter, their physical interaction creates a vacuum—an enormous, empty space made up of antimatter. The expression within the episode has a different meaning compared to the real-life Dirac sea, and is intended to be understood as a world of energy belonging to another dimension.

Critics noted the Dirac sea and the concept of "imaginary numbers space" depicted in the anime may have been inspired by the novel Ten Billion Days and One Hundred Billion Nights (億の昼と千億の夜, Oku no hiru to sen oku no yoru) by Japanese writer Ryū Mitsuse rather than the real Dirac sea. The Evangelion Glossary (エヴァンゲリオン用語事典, Evangerion Yougo Jiten) by Yahata Shoten linked the "imaginary number space" with Stephen Hawking's imaginary time. According to an official encyclopedia named Evangelion Chronicle, a space of imaginary numbers is where "protons and antiprotons appear, collide and disappear into the void". According to Ritsuko, the Dirac sea could be connected to another universe. For writer Álvaro Arbonés, Shinji is both alive and dead in this quantum vacuum, like Erwin Schrödinger's cat. One scene depicts a blackboard on which Ritsuko has written that there are strings inside Leliel; the writing is a reference to string theory, according to which spacetime is made up of ten dimensions. Ritsuko on the same board also mentions "redshift," a phenomenon in cosmology whereby the light of galaxies shifts to the red due to the expansion of the universe due to the Doppler effect.

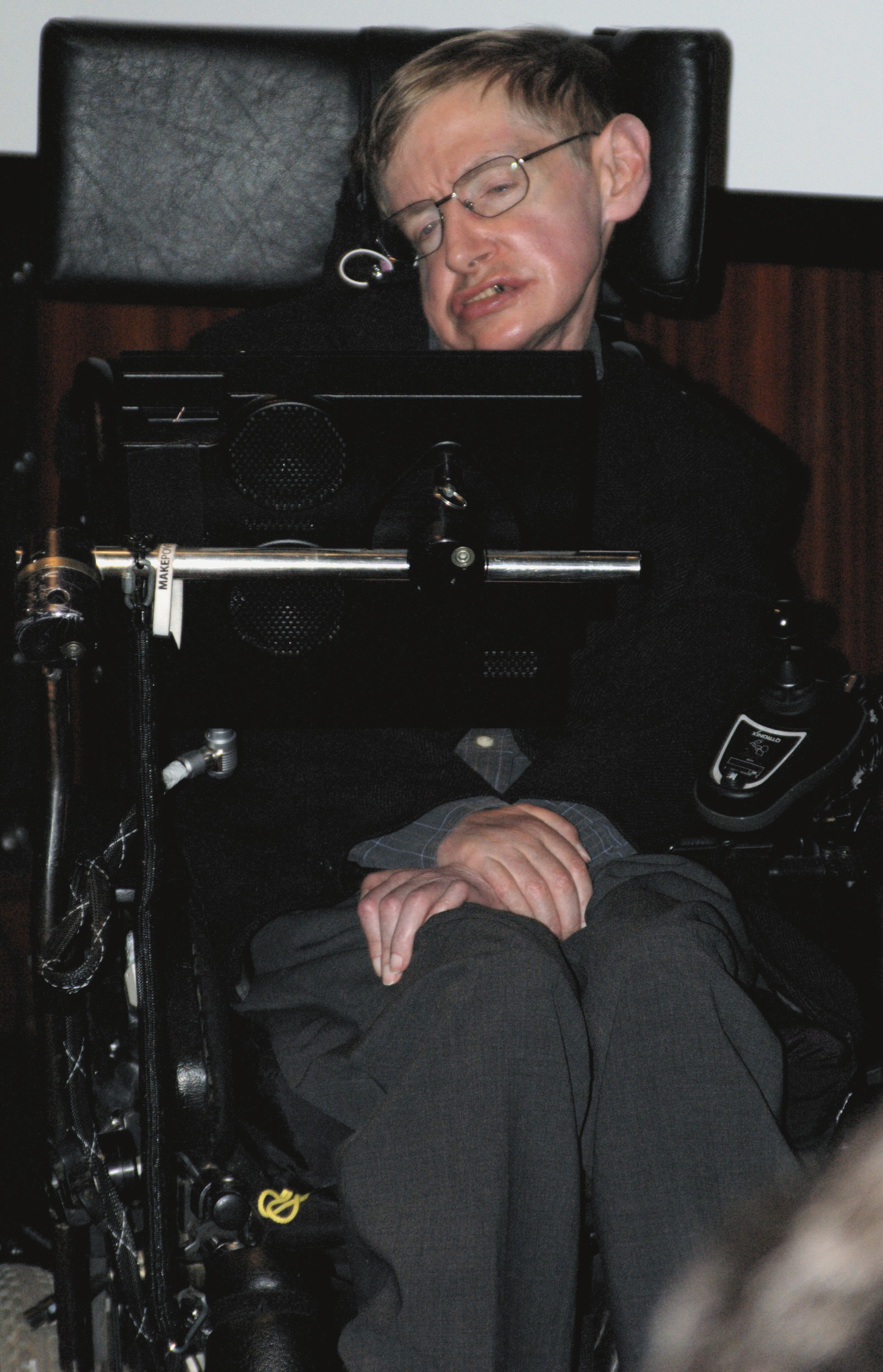
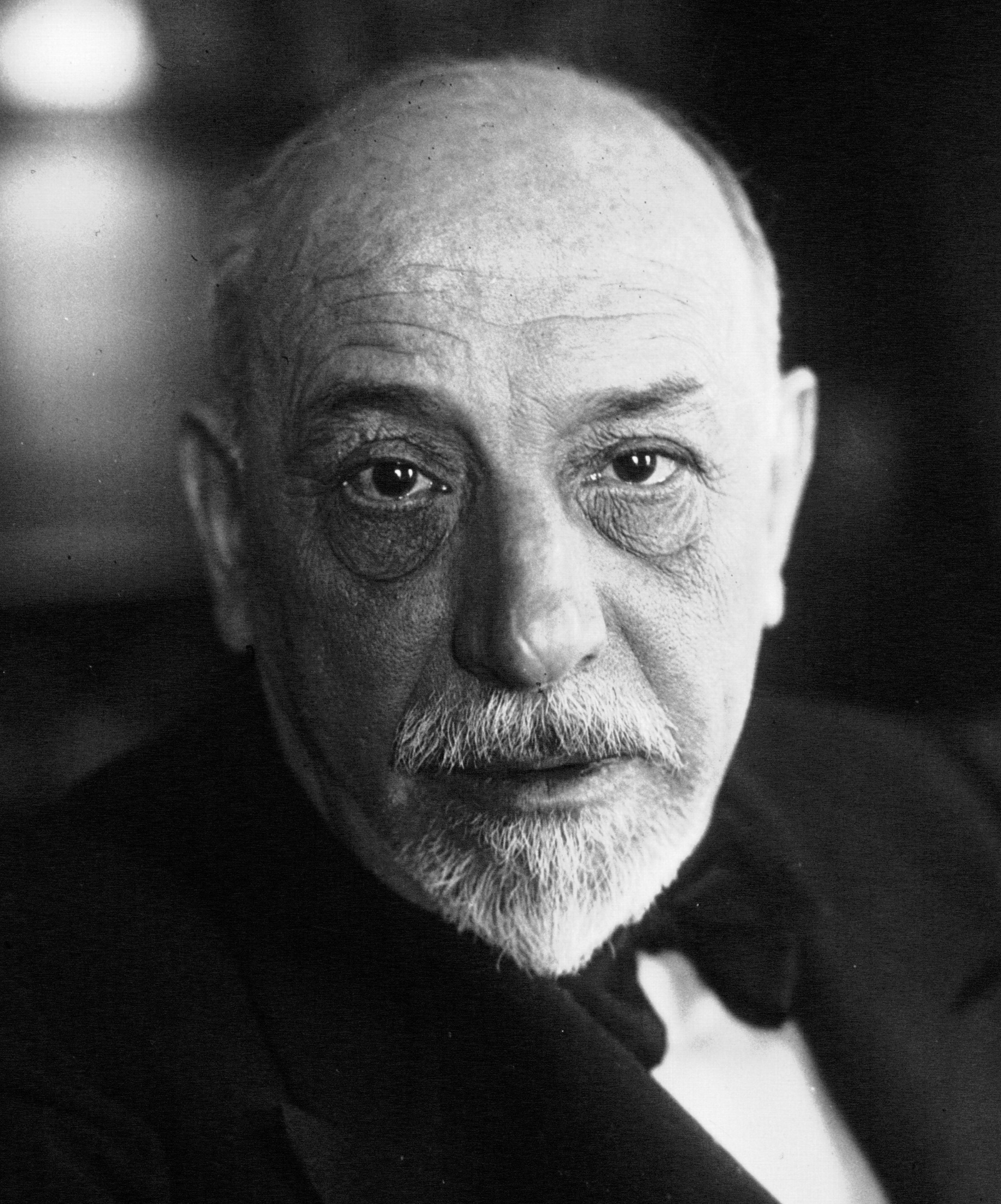
Critics compared concepts from "Splitting of the Breast" with Stephen Hawking's theories and Italian writer Luigi Pirandello's mask theory, according to with human psyche is fragmented due to social roles

Writer Dennis Redmond interpreted Ritsuko's plan to detonate all existing N² bombs to defeat Leliel and recover Eva-01 as the series' last explicit reference to the Cold War; and Leliel's ability to absorb Tokyo-3 skyscrapers as analogous to the deflation of Japan's overpriced real-estate market after the post-1990 collapse of the bubble economy. He described the sudden release of the Eva-01 as "the shocking birth of a whole new geopolitical subject"; according to him, Eva-01's rebirth signals the arrival of a genuinely East-Asian subjectivity that is "red in export-platform tooth and silicon claw, its eyes glowing with the demonic industrial energies of the Pacific Rim". Writer Álvaro Arbonés also linked Evangelion to the socioeconomic crisis in Japan during those years, shaken by the Great Hanshin Earthquake and the Tokyo subway sarin attack perpetrated by the Aum Shinrikyō sect shortly before the series' broadcast. Furthermore, in the scene where Shinji travels by bus, an advertisement for a store called Bashar is audible, whose name is a reference to a cosmic entity of the same name discussed in books by alleged spiritual medium and writer Darryl Anka.

Scholar Jonas Faria Costa compared Shinji's journey in "Splitting of the Breast" with existentialist philosophy. He begins to reflect on himself, discovering there are "many Shinjis" in the episode, since every person has a different perception of him. According to Costa, Shinji's reflections resemble the mask theory of Italian writer Luigi Pirandello, according to which the human psyche is fragmented due to the social masks people wear. Costa also noted Shinji smells blood inside Eva's cockpit, comparing this to Albert Camus' absurdism: "It's the feeling of mortality. Death is absurd. For this reason, life is absurd". Scholar Sano Yasuyuki similarly compared the many-Shinjis scene to the French philosopher Jean-Paul Sartre's statement "Hell is other people", since "these others are as ambiguous as in our past and our bodies". According to writer Andrew M. Winters, Shinji must comfort his beliefs, recognizing the amount of suffering that exists within the world, like the initiation step of the archetypal hero into Joseph Campbell's theories in The Hero with a Thousand Faces.

The episode's Japanese title is a reference to The Sickness Unto Death, the most important work of philosopher Søren Kierkegaard, who is considered the father of existentialism. The "sickness unto death" refers to "despair"; in the book's introduction, Kierkegaard says for a Christian, "Even death itself is not 'the sickness unto death'. Not to mention any of the suffering on Earth known as destitution, illness, misery, privations, misfortune, pain, anguish, grief, or regret." Kierkegaard's despair arises from humanity's relationship with itself. According to Yūichirō Oguro, the editor of supplemental materials included in the Japanese edition of the series, the title could refer to Shinji's facing and questioning of himself during the episode. For scholar Jake Potter, Kierkegaard's philosophy influenced "Splitting of the Breast" and the last two episodes of the series; both Evangelion and Kierkegaard also have a "unique framework, a kind of theological existentialism". Potter noted an institution named Seele hopes for death, while Misato is in despair. Shinji, on the other side, "abandoned his true self".

According to Japanese writer Manabu Tsuribe, "Evangelion grasps the ethical significance of Kierkegaard's thinking correctly". According to Kierkegaard's theology, "sickness unto death" can have three forms: desperately being unaware of having a self, desperately not wanting to be yourself, and desperately wanting to be yourself. Reviewer Giulio Gentile compared Shinji to the first form, Rei to the second, and Asuka to the third. Anime Everyeye's Cristiano Caliciotti described Shinji as a boy who does not want to be himself and Asuka as a girl who desperately wants to be herself. In an interview, director Anno Hideaki said he had never read the book but had cited it out of pedantry to seem intelligent; he had only read the first few pages and quickly lost interest in it, so he made assumptions about the rest based on the little he had read. In another interview before the series aired, Anno expressed his doubts about the future of animation of the time. According to him, Japanese animation was in a phase of desperation, and people were trying to hide it by talking about hope; according to Anno: "Hope is essentially just a product of despair, so to talk about hope is to be desperate. And despair has another name, 'the sickness unto death'". Anno described Evangelion itself as "a product of despair".

=== Psychology ===
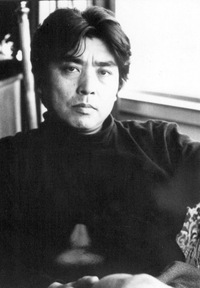
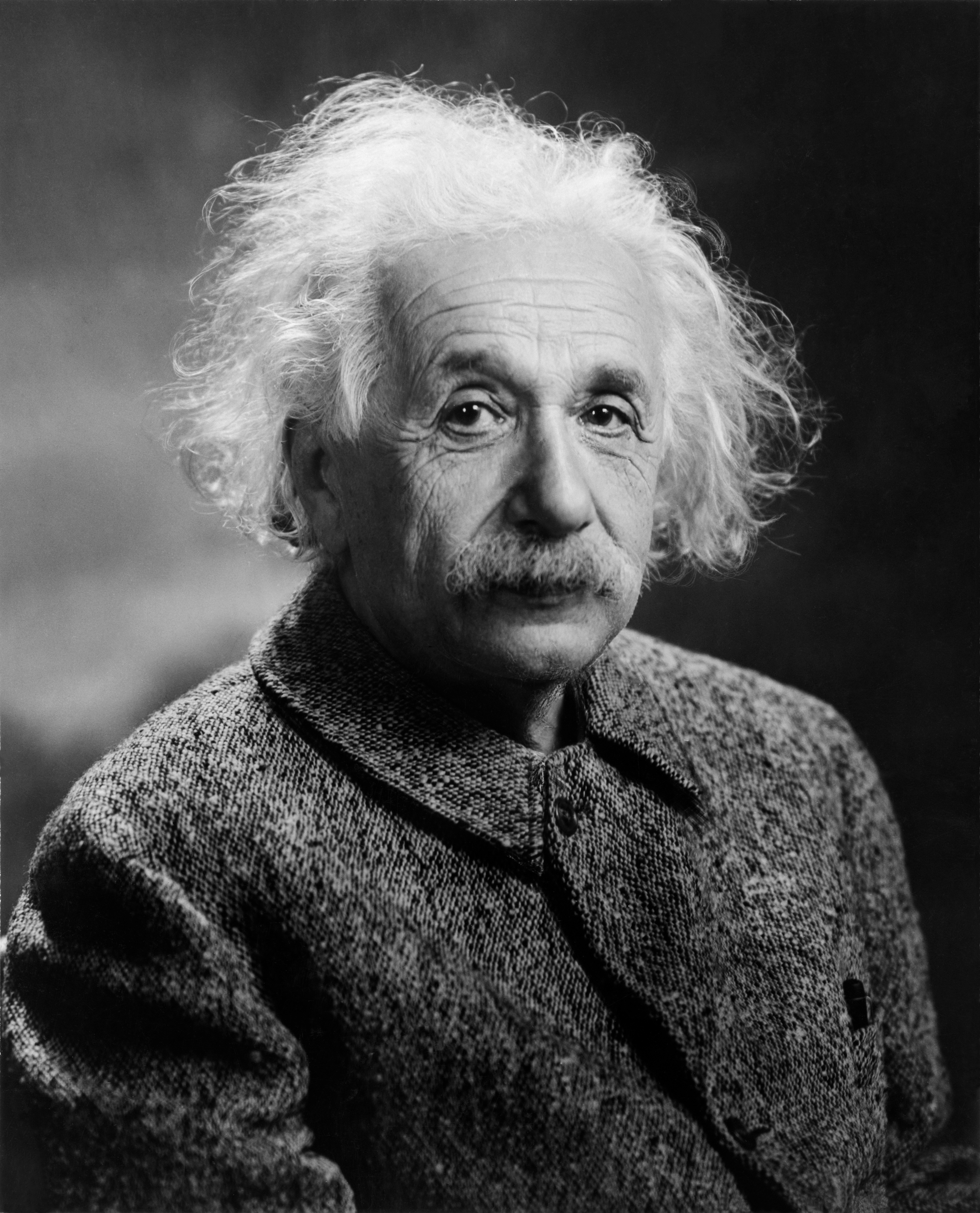
Anime critics have linked concepts mentioned in "Splitting of the Breast" to Ryū Murakami's novel Ai to gensō no fascism and Albert Einstein's theory of relativity

According to Thrillist's Emma Stefansky, from the sixteenth episode, Neon Genesis Evangelion starts to become less of a robots-versus-monsters series and more of "an enigmatic character study". Screen Rant website editor Zach Zamora wrote that, "for the first time, the week's Angel attack turned into an introspective character study of the series' protagonist, featuring highly stylized and entrancing visuals". "Splitting of the Breast" is part of a series of character-focused episodes and it particularly focuses on Shinji's story. According to Kazuya Tsurumaki, the first part of the episode proceeds like a "normal story", while the second half proceeds as an "introspective story"; therefore, the boundary between the first and the second half of the installment could be considered "the dividing line between the front and back of Evangelion". According to the encyclopedia Evangelion Chronicle, the episode's direction focuses entirely on Shinji's psychological portrayal and therefore omits external narrative elements involving the Angels. "Splitting of the Breast" is also the first episode of Evangelion to explicitly address the exploration of the human heart, a theme that is present throughout the series and becomes dominant in its second half.

In the opening scene, Asuka accuses Shinji of being self-deprecating or intropunitive and apologizing for everything as though he was conditioned to do so to avoid being criticized or scolded. Self-affliction is one of the episode's themes; it is a mental mechanism with which the subject blames themself for the negative things that happen to them. According to an official card game about the series, Shinji wants to be praised and treated kindly by others; because he is afraid of being hated, he withdraws into his shell and apologizes because "it is less painful to accuse yourself than to let others accuse you". Scholars Nathan Visser and Adam Barkman noted that Asuka expresses disgust for Shinji’s passive attitude in the scene. Writer Hans-Georg Eilenberger also noted that Asuka is disgusted by discovering Misato has a new relationship with her ex-boyfriend Kaji in the same scene. According to Eilenberger, while she anticipates the sexual role of the adult and embraces the bodily changes that put her on track toward adulthood, Asuka also clings to her childlike ways; when Misato denies that she is dating Kaji, Asuka "berates the insincerity of adult relationships".

In the following scenes, Shinji receives compliments from Misato and feels a wave of joy and pride after the praise. According to Anime Feminist writers, he starts to internalize toxic masculinity after this. Asuka, who is characterized by a proud psychology and is accustomed to being admired, is furious at Shinji's reaction, which for her represents a defeat. She has complex feelings for Shinji and punches the locker in frustration. During the battle against Leliel, Asuka provokes Shinji, who is unusually courageous and decides to face the enemy alone, saying fighting is "a man's job". Shinji is defeated and absorbed into Leliel; he responds to Asuka's provocation by saying otehon misete yaru yo (お手本見せてやるよ; "I'll show you how it's done") using the masculine and haughty directional suffix te yaru. In Japanese, te yaru indicates that one person will do something for someone of lower status; using it requires a great deal of self-confidence, and it is usually used only by men who have confidence in their superior social positions. After Shinji's defeat, Asuka publicly complains about him, provoking an immediate reaction from Rei Ayanami, who is usually cold and doesn't answer to Asuka's provocations. Rei looks Asuka directly in the eyes, something she rarely does; Evangelion Chronicle also noted that, up to this point, Rei has only interacted with Shinji and Gendo. In the last scene, however, Asuka secretly visits Shinji in the hospital; seeing Asuka's behavior, Shinji smiles. For Álvaro Arbonés, the scene carries a significant weight considering Rei's past cold behaviour and Asuka's inability to "act like an adult".

Critics compared the image of Eva-01 escaping from Leliel crying and covered in blood to a birth

According to academic Cristopher Smith, until his clash with Leliel, Shinji managed to become a man and fit into the "hegemonic hetero-masculinity" like a typical robot-anime protagonist. In one scene, for example, Shinji contemplates his hand, clasping his fingers and saying the masculine-language phrase yosh ("all right"). Writers Yokohama Yūji and Yūichirō Oguro noted hands are an important motif in Evangelion, often indicating an inflection point; Oguro wrote, "Hands are the tools humans use to communicate with others and the outside world, whether they are loving each other or hurting each other". Smith noted Shinji is trapped inside an "empty, womblike" void and curls up in a fetal position in a uterine bath of oxygenating liquid inside the Eva. After that, he is passively dependent on women—Misato, Ritsuko, and Yui—to save him. According to Oguro, the fact that the male protagonist displays masculinity before the battle and is then sucked into the mother's womb symbolizes the series' skepticism about the value of masculinity. Newspaper Mainichi Shimbun noted that a close contact between an Evangelion and an Angel "would have resulted in combat" in a normal anime. According to Newtype magazine, the series follows the path inaugurated by Gundam's character Amuro Ray, due to which, male protagonists of mecha anime have gradually become less heroic. Furthermore, for writer Álvaro Arbonés, despite the common fan perception of Shinji's character as weak, he stayed stable and assertive until "Splitting of the Breast".

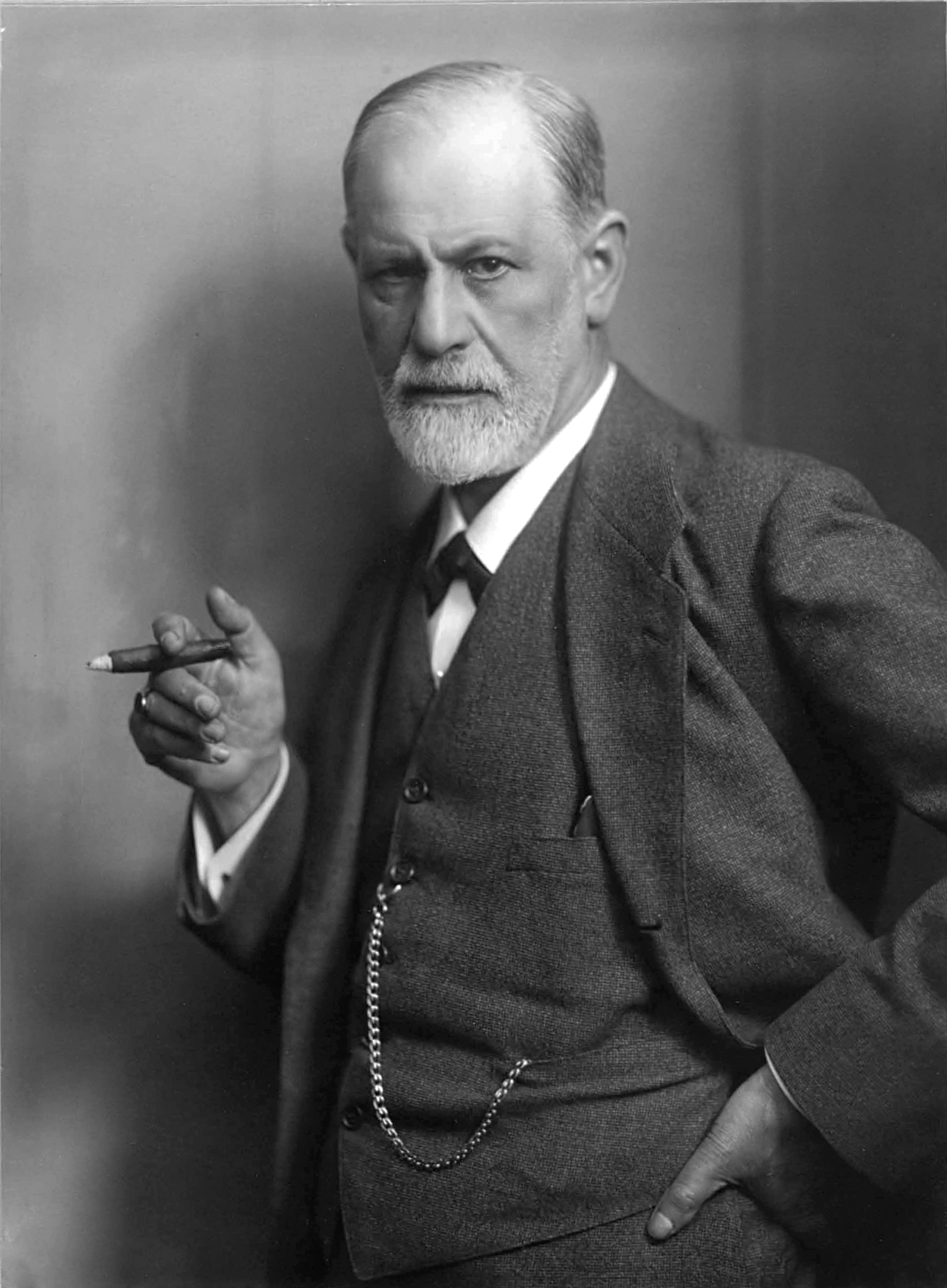
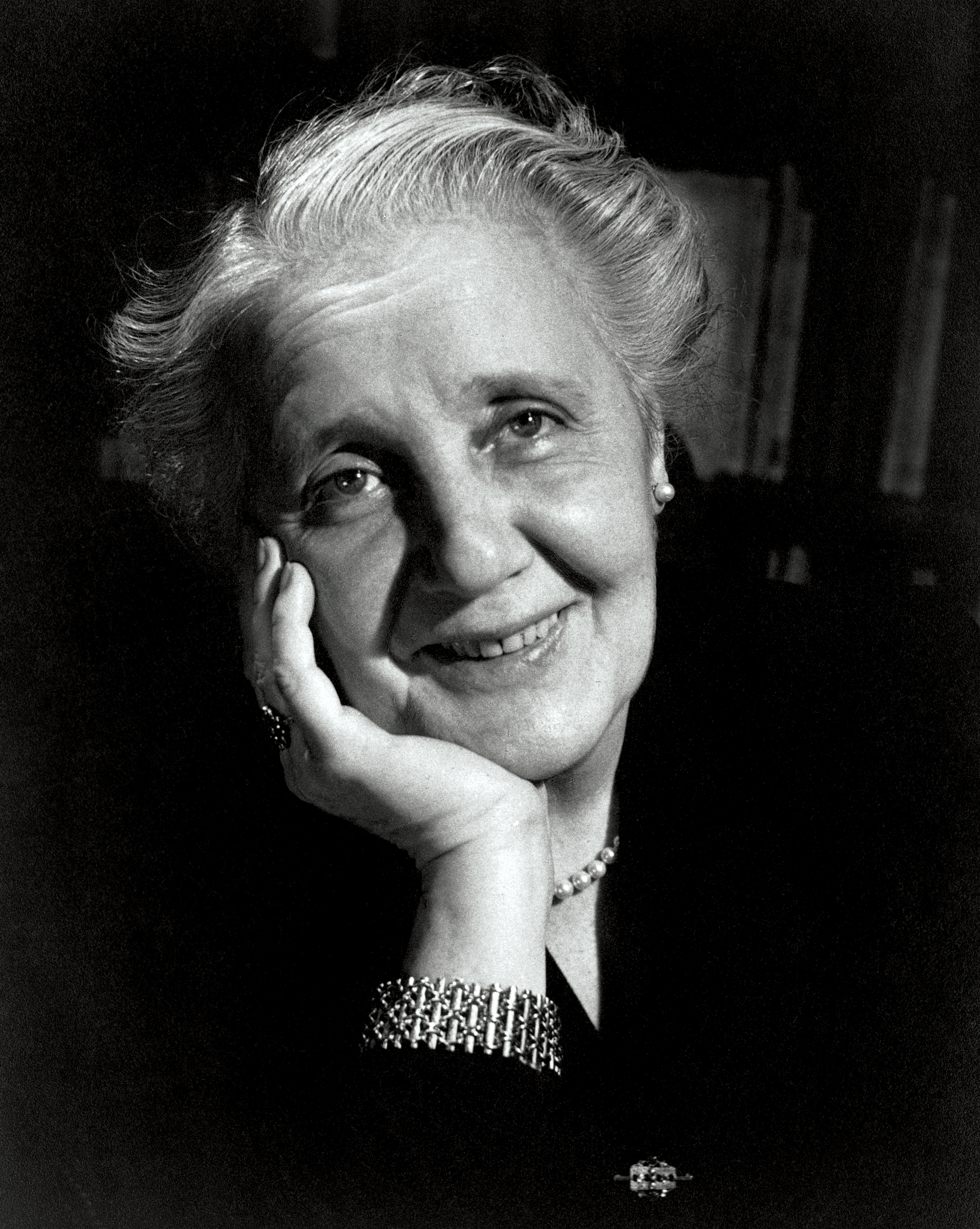
Newtype official filmbooks on the series linked Shinji's monologue to Sigmund Freud's ego and super ego theory, while the English title, "Splitting of the Breast", is a reference to Melanie Klein's concept of the same name

Inside Leliel, Shinji sees his estranged father Gendo, who praises him; Shinji sees Gendo's praise as a source of spiritual strength, suggesting he fears his father but still wants his approval, a theme the series had already introduced in the twelfth episode. In a world without the concept of time, Shinji has a vision in which he sees another, younger self. He discusses himself with his other self sitting in a train cabin at sunset. The other Shinji coldly analyzes like a doctor the weak points of Shinji; he tells the real Shinji that other versions of himself exist in other people's minds, and "they are all Ikari Shinji". According to researcher Satohi Tsukamoto, "Shinji contemplates that he has two selves within himself: a core self and a self that acknowledges the core self". Mechademia magazine described the monologue as a dialogue that is "reminiscent of a psychoanalytic therapy session". According to Evangelion Chronicle magazine, the scene's train alludes to life. Yahata Shoten's Evangelion Glossary also noted how Shinji is seen with a red pearl resembling an Angel's core in the same scene. According to the original script, the pearl symbolizes what is truly important to Shinji. As noted by writer Khegan M. DelPort, Shinji may "contain multitudes", but people can still recognize him as Shinji; Shinji might run, but he can't escape "the other" in himself, "the other" revealed in the sea of Dirac. Scholar Giuseppe Gatti similarly noted that the hyper-intimacy achieved between Eva and children during the berserk mode produces "a schizophrenic fragmentation of Shinji's sense of self" which corresponds to a fragmentation of "the diegetic time and space".

According to the official filmbooks of the series, the two versions of Shinji represent the psychoanalytic concepts of ego and super ego, which Sigmund Freud presented in his work The Ego and the Id. The Anime Café likened Shinji's dialogue with himself, in which he says there are many "Shinji Ikari" present in the minds of other people, to Albert Einstein's theory of relativity, which discusses the role of the "local observer" in high-speed physics. According to Japanese writer Minami Ooka, the idea that images of oneself exist in the consciousness of other people comes from Ryū Murakami's novel Ai to gensō no fascism (愛と幻想のファシズム; "The Fascism of Love and Fantasy"); in a scene of the novel, Fruit, girlfriend of the protagonist Zero, tells him there are several Zeros. According to Arbonés, Murakami's works share with Evangelion a climate of pessimism typical of those years of crisis for Japan. Arbonés also found similar themes in Shinya Tsukamoto's Tetsuo: The Iron Man (1989); both Tsukamoto and Anno share an obsession with sexuality, the underworld, and "protagonists who unsuccessfully search for their identity". Academic Yuya Sato likened the style of monologue between the two Shinji to girls' manga, also known as shōjo. The words of the monologue are spoken without presupposing the recipient of the message, without any intention of having someone listen to it, just as in shōjo. Within the narrative universe of shōjo manga, no communication occurs between characters, but the reader can still read monologues. Furthermore, Japanese architect Kaichiro Morikawa compared the structure of the episode to director Bill Viola's work "Nantes Triptych", which consists of a triptych of three video sequences, of which the middle one shows a body sinking into a bluish liquid, while the last one depicts the birth of a baby.

"Splitting of the Breast" also presents various motherhood and womb symbolisms. During the episode, Yui's image appears to Shinji, suggesting a link between Yui and Eva-01. In the final scene, Eva-01 tears the Angel's shadow to pieces, screaming and covered in blood, an image that recalls childbirth and the crying of a child. Protoculture Addicts magazine noted Eva-01 finds itself a prisoner "in a kind of womb", and while destroying Leliel the Eva is "born a second time". Writer Hans-Georg Eilenberger similarly noted Dr. Akagi is shocked by the scene; according to Eilenberger, "she doesn't see a mother raging to protect her son", but the birth of "a new, savage being, born out of the evisceration of an Angel". While absorbed inside Leliel, Shinji notices the cabin of Eva-01 smells of blood. Oguro wrote that the episode's images and sounds connect the image of the Eva-01 cockpit to a womb, and that female genitalia are visible in the geometric patterns of Leliel's spherical body. Italian writer Bartoli noted the episode's first image represents water, or rather of "female waters". The episode's English title, "Splitting of the Breast", refers to the psychoanalytical concept studied by Melanie Klein, according to whom in the first years of life, a child divides the perception of the mother's breast in two, separating it into a "good" and a "bad breast" during the first stage of psychosexual development, the oral stage. According to Oguro, Eva-01 can be interpreted as a "bad breast", while Yui saves Shinji at the end and can be seen as a "good breast". Anno also used the Freudian splitting theory for the final episode, in which Shinji sees both the good and bad sides of other people. According to Bartoli, Shinji is always in a state of dissociation and "splitting" because he wants to accept only pleasant things while fleeing from unpleasant ones. The title can also be understood as a reference to the "torn chest" and the conflict that takes place in Shinji's heart.

=== Critique of otaku ===
For Yūichirō Oguro, Shinji is not a boy who particularly likes anime or videogames but his desire to turn away from unpleasant things and only do fun things is "otaku-like"; according to him, Leliel's words to Shinji, who run away from problems—"You can not collect pleasant things like a rosary"—are "sure to be painful for fans of Evangelion to hear". Oguro also stated that "these questions about people who indulge in their own pleasures led director Anno to criticize otaku after the first airing of the show". In 1996, Anno said he was disappointed with the reception of the original series, which had become a place of refuge in which to escape from "unpleasant things". According to Kazuya Tsurumaki, the phrase reflects Anno's direct style; because most people do not really pay attention to the dialogue in an anime, Anno began to incorporate more blunt expressions; Tsurumaki also said that "expressions which were more introspective or emotionally expressive became more frequent". He also said he worked on the series with the idea that Shinji's feelings are a reflection of those of Anno, who is also an otaku; Anno's criticism of otaku culture therefore also serves as a form of self-criticism. Tsurumaki described Neon Genesis Evangelion as a "story about communication" that is aimed at otaku, and that the show "is a message aimed at anime fans, including [Anno] himself, and of course, me too. In other words, it's useless for non-anime fans to watch it. If a person who can already live and communicate normally watches it, they won't learn anything".

== Reception ==
"Splitting of the Breast" was first broadcast on January 17, 1996, and drew a 9.4% audience share on Japanese television. In 1996, it ranked sixteenth among the best anime episodes of the Anime Grand Prix, a large annual poll made by Animage. In July 2020, Comic Book Resources reported an 8.8/10 rating for the installment on IMDb, making it third among the highest-rated Evangelion episodes. Merchandise based on the episode, including a line of official T-shirts, has been released.

The episode received a positive reception from anime critics. According to GameFan magazine, "Splitting of the Breast" is widely considered to be one of the best episodes of the anime. The Anime Café's Akio Nagatomi positively received the episode, praising the "fitting" symbolism behind Shinji's emergence from Leliel, describing Shinji's voyage of self-discovery as "brilliant" and the symbolic use of the sound of a road passing underneath with obstacles during the scene as "striking". Nagatomi also noted Shinji is drawn a little differently toward the end of his mental journey, a detail he described as "the most deft touch" of the installment. DVD Talk plauded "Splitting of the Breast", the previous and the following installment as "excellent" for their "consistent batch of character drama and lighter moments". Film School Rejects' Max Covill praised the violence and "terrific animation" presented in the installment, describing it as an "excellent episode"; he also praised the image of Yui's soul inside Eva-01 for its "ethereal quality". SyFy Wire's Daniel Dockery described Unit 01's exit from Leliel as an "iconic" moment. Comic Book Resources' Akjay Aravind listed Leliel's battle among the best Neon Genesis Evangelion fights.

According to Yahoo! website, the episode's gory conclusion delivers on the action, but "the greatest intrigue shifts to the vivid illustration of internal conflicts". Comic Book Resources listed Shinji's absorption inside Leliel as one of the ten times "Neon Genesis Evangelion was too disturbing for its own good". Another Comic Book Resources editor, Eduardo Luquin, criticized Shinji's initial overconfidence before Leliel's battle. Other reviewers were more appreciative. Digitally Obsessed's Joel Cunningham called the race to save Shinji "very interesting" and said this element of the episode is "nicely offset with Shinji's introspective moments". Anime News Network's Martin Theron praised "Splitting of the Breast" and the other episodes of the arc, and actor Spike Spencer's "top-rate work" as Shinji in the English dub; his colleague James Beckett similarly lauded it, saying: "I was shown how a series could confront and dismantle its audience's expectations in a way that was exhilarating to watch". Fangoria wrote: "There's something especially horrifying about an Angel that weaponizes quantum physics". Looper praised Leliel's design as one of the "coolest" in the series and "awesome".

According to Comic Book Resources, the opening official video of the anime series Chainsaw Man contains a reference to the scene in which Unit 01 escapes from Leliel.
