= She said, "Don't make others suffer for your personal hatred." =

"She said, 'Don't make others suffer for your personal hatred.'"
- Neon Genesis Evangelion episode
- Fourteen-year-old Misato Katsuragi in the opening flashback set at the South Pole. The scene was rendered in a sepia tone and was praised by Film School Rejects' Max Covill.
- Episode no.: Episode 12
- Directed by: Hiroyuki Ishido
- Written by: Hideaki Anno, Akio Satsukawa
- Original air date: December 20, 1995
- Running time: 22 minutes

Episode chronology
← Previous "The Day Tokyo-3 Stood Still"	Next → "Lilliputian Hitcher"

"She said, 'Don't make others suffer for your personal hatred.'", also known by the Japanese title "The Value of Miracles" (Note: Japanese: 奇跡の価値は, Hepburn: Kiseki no kachi wa) is the twelfth episode of the Japanese anime television series Neon Genesis Evangelion, which was created by animation studio Gainax. The episode was first broadcast on TV Tokyo on December 20, 1995. It was written by Hideaki Anno and Akio Satsukawa and directed by Hiroyuki Ishido. The series is set fifteen years after a worldwide cataclysm known as Second Impact and is mostly set in the futuristic city of Tokyo-3. The series' protagonist is Shinji Ikari, a teenage boy who is recruited by his father Gendo to the special military organization Nerv to pilot a biomechanical mecha named Evangelion into combat with beings called Angels. During the episode, Nerv's Major Misato Katsuragi recalls her past as a survivor of the Second Impact, while a new, large-sized Angel called Sahaquiel threatens to destroy the entire Nerv headquarters.

At the beginning of the production, the main enemy was supposed to be an Angel called Turel. The episode, part of the series' action arc, blends comedy and action together and is markedly positive in its portrayal of the characters' relationships, particularly those between protagonist Shinji and Misato, and Shinji and his father Gendo. "She said, 'Don't make others suffer for your personal hatred'" echoes Hideaki Anno's typical themes, presenting through the character of Misato an optimistic view of human endeavour at the expense of fatalism and determinism. The installment also features several religious references, including the Christian concept of original sin and the biblical story of Sodom and Gomorrah.

"She said, 'Don't make others suffer for your personal hatred'" drew a 7.4% audience share on Japanese television. It received a generally positive reception. Some reviewers criticised the banality of the plot and the brevity of the battle against Sahaquiel, while other critics praised the action, the optimism, and the focus on the personal interrelationships between the main characters.

== Plot ==
Misato Katsuragi, head of the strategic department of the special agency Nerv, recalls a trauma she experienced when she was fourteen years old. A giant of light woke up at the South Pole during an experiment, causing the melting of the southern ice cap and the death of her father, Dr. Katsuragi; despite being at the South Pole at the time of the incident, known as Second Impact, Misato managed to escape the disaster and survive. After the flashback, Misato is promoted in rank, and grudgingly celebrates her promotion with her subordinates, Evangelion mecha pilots Shinji Ikari and Asuka Langley Soryu.

Sahaquiel, the tenth specimen of a race of mankind's antagonists called Angels, makes its appearance in satellite orbit. The enemy is much larger than the Evangelion units, and the Nerv believes its attack strategy is to crash-land using its own body as a bomb. Shinji, Asuka, and fellow pilot Rei Ayanami, aboard their respective Evangelions, intercept the enemy, and by joining forces they succeed in defeating it against all of Nerv's probabilistic predictions, with Asuka delivering the final blow. At the end of the confrontation, Nerv's Commander Gendo Ikari, who had remained at the South Pole on a mysterious expedition until then, congratulates his son Shinji. Shinji, thinking back to his father's unexpected words of praise, realises that this is why he boards the Evangelion and has decided to become a pilot.

== Production ==
Sahaquiel's original design, drawn by Yoshiyuki Sadamoto

Akio Satsukawa and Neon Genesis Evangelion director Hideaki Anno wrote the script for "She said, 'Don't make others suffer for your personal hatred.'", while Masayuki handled the storyboards. Hiroyuki Ishido served as director for the installment. Satoshi Shiteta worked as a chief animator, while Mitsumu Wogi served as assistant character designer. The production also involved other companies, including Studio Ye Seong, Vega Entertainment, and Studio Deen. Megumi Hayashibara, Yūko Miyamura, Miki Nagasawa, and Junko Iwao, voice actresses of several main characters in the series, played audible announcers in various sequences of "She said, 'Don't make others suffer for your personal hatred'". Hayashibara also voiced a DJ speaker audible in the background in the scene where Shinji and Misato argue in the car. In addition to the original soundtrack, composed by Shirō Sagisu, the staff used the song "Bay side love story" by Masami Okui during the installment. Yōko Takahashi, who had already sung the opening theme song, also sang a 4beat version of "Fly Me to the Moon" used as the episode's closing theme song. In late home video editions of the series, the staff replaced the 4beat version with a new cover named "Misato Main".

In 1993, Gainax published a presentation document for Neon Genesis Evangelion entitled New Century Evangelion (tentative name) Proposal (新世紀エヴァンゲリオン (仮) 企画書, Shinseiki Evangelion (kari) kikakusho), containing the initial synopsis for the twelfth episode. The Proposal document was then published in 1994. In the Proposal, the installment was supposed to be entitled "An Eighteen-Second Miracle" (18秒の奇跡, 18-byō no kiseki). The Angel initially envisaged as the enemy of the episode was not to be Sahaquiel, but an Angel named Turel, "the rock of God". Writer Virginie Nebbia compared Turel's design, similar to a giant floating head, with the Emperor Neo mask from Nadia: The Secret of Blue Water. Sahaquiel was initially supposed to look like a thin string instead, similar to Armisael, in order to show the audience that the Evangelion enemies can also be non-anthropomorphic. Series director Hideaki Anno eventually worked on Armisael's design, which, unlike the Ultraman-like designs of the other Angels, resembles the actual Biblical Angels. According to Anno, the series scenario originally included an "origami Angel" with a shape similar to the Möbius strip. Animator Mitsuo Iso proposed removing Turel, the "bomb Angel", inserting an Angel capable of disassembling himself instead. In Iso's proposals, Kaji would have used a ceramic fighter against the Angel. The idea was put forward that the Angels were gradually learning from battles against humans; Turel's suicide bomb attack would have benefited the following Angel. His notes also contain the phrase: "I'd like to see something like this Aum by Sadamoto". Furthermore, Gainax originally planned for Adam to have two wings rather than the four seen in the final version.

Gualtiero Cannarsi, editor of the first Italian adaptation of the series, noted how the opening scene of Misato's flashback is almost entirely drawn with a sepia effect, except for the red elements; this choice emphasises the blood, accentuating the drama of the scene. Academic William Routt also noted how Neon Genesis Evangelion frequently uses still frames with no movement, especially in the twelfth episode. According to Routt, while still images are primarily used in Neon Genesis Evangelion and other anime for economic reasons and financial constraints, stillness is "not unconnected to the underlying thematics of the series" and seems to be intended to underline or draw attention to significant moments. For example, Gendo is represented speaking with his hands folded in front of his mouth to represent a cold person who seems to know more and to command more than others. Still images are particularly used during the party scene for Shinji, as they are tied to the character's psychological motivation and "intuitively understood as cues to think or feel Shinji's reaction to what is being said". Still and limited animation images are also used in the flashback in which Shinji talks with Misato about her past. For Routt, still imagery functions as a basis for perceiving that "his relations with his father resemble what she is telling him about her relation with her father".

In the episode's original draft, Gainax planned to foreshadow Hikari Horaki's romantic feelings for her classmate Toji and the dialogue between Gendo and Fuyutsuki was slightly different. The scene in which Misato explains the strategy against Sahaquiel to Asuka and the other pilots was instead set in the park within Nerv's geofront, and the Evas were meant to exceed the speed of sound during the battle. Kaji was to speak with Misato while carrying a briefcase before departing on a flight, and in the final scene, following Sahaquiel's defeat, Shinji would have seen Asuka and Rei smiling at him on the Eva monitors. For the scene with Gendo and Fuyutsuki in Antarctica, in which a red sea full of salt columns is framed, the authors took up an idea already presented in the last episode of the series Nadia: The Secret of Blue Water, in which the series' main antagonist, Gargoyle, is turned into salt. According to the character designer of the series, Yoshiyuki Sadamoto, the post-apocalyptic scenario and the use of the Dead Sea Scrolls in Neon Genesis Evangelion are also a "side effect" of Nadia. The original scenario of the series also did not involve an explosion at the south pole, but a "Dead Sea evaporation accident". Even Misato's motto, uttered during the operation against Sahaquiel, "The value of a miracle only becomes real when it has happened", echoes similar phrases and themes presented in previous Gainax works, such as Nadia and Gunbuster. Before the fight Rei also says that she does not eat meat and orders a meat-free ramen; for Rei's characterisation Anno took inspiration from his personal experience as a long-time vegetarian, similarly to what he had already done with Nadia Arwol, the protagonist of The Secret of Blue Water.

== Cultural references and themes ==
Throughout the installment, Shinji's psychology is explored, as well as his relationship with Misato Katsuragi. Another theme is the depiction of Shinji and Misato's inner world and Shinji's doubts about the real reason why he decides to pilot the Eva-01. The episode is the culmination of the positivity and lightness of the action arc of the series, in which the narration focuses on humour and battles, while the relationships of the protagonists seem to reach the point of resolution and the story moves towards a happy ending. As noted by writer Alexandre Marine, "She said, "Don't make others suffer for your personal hatred." depicts a battle involving all three main Evangelion units, with the three pilots defeating an Angel together. This arc also contains typical shōnen elements, like cooperation and victory over enemies. Gendo, for example, portrayed in the early episodes as a cold and aloof father, congratulates Shinji and compliments him. Shinji realises after this event that he pilots the Eva-01 only to receive the approval of his parent, whose praise moves him to unexpected happiness and surprise him. According to scholar Satoshi Tsukamoto, Shinji starts to regain his self-esteem after this. As noted by Newtype magazine, Gendo's approval is a "double-edged sword" though. At the end of the episode, after hearing Shinji say that he pilots the Eva to earn his father's approval, Asuka calls him an idiot; the episode's original script noted that her line was to be delivered with a hint of tenderness. Writer Dennis Redmond has noted how Gendo's compliments are an "unusual moment" for Japanese culture, which "tends to recognise group achievement rather than individual merit". Gendo's praise gives Shinji a reason to pilot the Eva, a theme the series later reprises in the sixteenth episode, "Splitting of the Breast". Misato, on the other hand, shows great faith in man's possibilities in the course of the plot, renouncing fatalistic or deterministic attitudes, echoing Hideaki Anno's work typical themes.

In "She said, 'Don't make others suffer for your personal hatred'", as noted by writer David Bordonaba-Plou, Misato's plan is based on human intuition, a theme already introduced in the seventh episode, "A Human Work". The victories over the Angels aren't due to the intervention of a supreme being; they look like "miracles", but this is due to the people working to deal with the attack. According to scholar Álvaro Arbonés, Misato is the main focus of the episode, exploring her limits, insecurities, and "how far her mask of professionalism goes". Misato's connection with Second Impact is explored, as foreshadowed by the last scene from "Magmadiver", in which a scar on her chest is visible. Shinji, on the other side, during the dinner part to celebrate Misato's promotion is still not used to being around many people, so he doesn't know how to have fun or to engage; Anime Feminist website writer noted this is psychologically realistic, since he's still introverted but "he's trying. He's making that effort". "She said, 'Don't make others suffer for your personal hatred'" is also the episode in which Shinji and Misato understand each other. Both Shinji and Misato must come to grips with their feelings for their respective fathers. As noted by writers Álvaro Arbonés, Heather Browning, and Walter Weit, Asuka, Misato and Shinji show a desire to be seen and recognized by other people. Furthermore, Asuka, characterised by a grumpy and proud character, is annoyed by the achievements of her colleague Shinji in the episode. Gualtiero Cannarsi ascribed her conduct to a manly protest, a psychological term for a form of rebellion identifiable in women who are tired of the role stereotypically associated with the female gender. Asuka acts as if she tries to prove herself and surpass the male gender, fusing an "inferiority complex" and "radical rivalry".

In the course of the episode, Asuka defines Misato's generation, the one that experienced Second Impact and its aftermath firsthand, as a "generation born poor". The expression "Second Impact Generation", also mentioned by a radio program in another scene in the episode, has been compared by Gualtiero Cannarsi to that of the "war generation". As noted by Japanese academic Taro Igarashi, it seems that there is a huge consciousness gap between the generations in the world of Neon Genesis Evangelion. At the end of the clash against Sahaquiel, Misato dines with the pilots, and while for Misato a steak is a reward, for the pilots it is not. According to writer Virginie Nebbia, Second Impact evokes reminiscences of the Second World War. Misato's or Gendo's generations are depicted as the ones who have been through the disaster, while Shinji's generation is identifiable as Anno's generation, known as shinjinrui (新人類; lit. "new human race") in Japanese. When Shinji and Asuka succeed at killing Sahaquiel, Misato can't even afford a steak dinner to reward them, instead having to go to an inexpensive ramen shop. Anthony Gramuglia of Anime Feminist, noticing how Misato is underpaid by Nerv despite the important work she does, made a parallelism with the Japanese Lost Generation and Millennials, who had difficulty finding housing and tend to be underpaid for the amount of work they do after the bursting of the Japanese asset price bubble. Misato also reveals that she joined Nerv to avenge her father; Luka Perušić compared this to Arthur Schopenhauer's philosophy, who argued that there's an inherent force in living nature that drives life to persist, which in turn tricks individual beings into continuing to exist.

"She said, 'Don't make others suffer for your personal hatred'" also contains religious references, particularly to Judaism and Christianity. In the first scene of the episode, Adam, the first Angel, is first portrayed in the form of a giant of light. Writers Kazuhisa Fujie and Martin Foster noted the giant of light silhouette resembles the Eva units, as he "carries restraining tackle on his shoulders and something resembling a core in his chest". Critic Marc MacWilliams noted Evangelion's Adam is represented as "in Kabbalistic texts before his Fall". Scholar Gavin McDowell similarly noted that biblical Adam is said to have first existed in "a gigantic, luminous, quasi-divine state", which he loses at the moment of his sin. Writer Virginie Nebbia linked Adam's appearance during Second Impact with the giant of light from Ultraman 80. Throughout the episode, Misato herself is glimpsed with a Second Impact scar on her chest. According to academic Fabio Bartoli this would suggest that Misato is the guinea pig in Adam's contact experiment that caused the Second Impact. Misato herself is seen being crossed by the Tree of Life in the video of "A Cruel Angel's Thesis", the show's theme song. Architect and academic Kaichiro Morikawa has likened Misato's scar to the character of Kushana from Nausicaä of the Valley of the Wind, who has a one-armed arm with an artificial prosthesis. Furthermore, as noted by Emily Wati Muir, Gendo is depicted with two colors during his meeting with Seele, symbolizing his double intentions.

The episode begins with a flashback to the year 2000 and a shot with the Earth rising above the cratered surface of the Moon. Japanese academic Yasutaka Yoshimura compared the image of aligned Earth and Moon with a planetary syzygy visible in Stanley Kubrick's 2001: A Space Odyssey (1968). In another scene, a maritime fleet is seen transporting a gigantic object called the Spear of Longinus on an aircraft carrier, whose name is taken from the legendary Christian relic of the same name. The name of Roman soldier Longinus comes from the apocryphal Gospel of Nicodemus. Legend has it that whoever wields this spear impregnated with Christ's blood will control the world. According to scholar Gavin McDowell, Evangelion's Spear of Longinus is named after the Christian relic because "it serves a parallel function—a weapon of immense power capable of piercing a god". Writer Patrick Drazen also compared Longinus' spear from Evangelion to Amenonuhoko (天沼矛), the spear of the two creator kami (deities) Izanagi and Izanami. In the same scene, Gendo Ikari and Kozo Fuyutsuki discuss the causes of Second Impact, mentioning the Christian concept of original sin; writer Dennis Redmond described their conversation as "quasi-theological". In the course of the discussion, columns of salt are framed throughout the waters of Antarctica, which turned red after the Second Impact. Comic Book Resources' Theo Kogod compared the melted sea of Antarctica to the Book of Revelation, in which the sea is turned red as blood. The pillars of salt constitute a reference to Sodom and Gomorrah and the episode of Lot's wife's transformation into a statue of salt.

In Evangelion, Fuyutsuki speaks of the Second Impact as a "punishment" inflicted on mankind for its crimes, calling the South Pole, a prohibitive place for any living species, "a real Dead Sea". It is believed that Sodom and Gomorrah were located near the southern end of the Dead Sea, known to be a completely prohibitive environment for the life of any aquatic species due to its extremely high salinity. In Neon Genesis Evangelion it is revealed that the Spear of Longinus is actually discovered in the Red Sea region before its transportation to Antarctica. In the same scene, Gendo says that science is the strength of mankind, another theme of the series. David Bordonaba-Plou thus described Ritsuko and Gendo as naturalists, since they have a philosophical distrust of introspection and human subjectivity. The series, with Gendo's speech, portrays humans as usurpers who seek god-like power; Nebbia compared this vision to Ultraseven, in which the Nonmalt people, Earth's original inhabitants, are oppressed by humans. For scholar Khegan M. DelPort, Gendo longs for a world purged of plurality, believing this to be the root of the world's problems; Fuyutsuki is more pragmatic, believing the Second Impact was grounded in human arrogance, and that these urges "can be managed without the apocalyptic remedy". According to DelPort, the conversation shows Neon Genesis Evangelion has postmodern metaphysics of the unity and plurality of Being. Furthermore, the Boa beer that Misato drinks in the episode refers to the Boa juice that appears in the anime movie Flying Phantom Ship (1969). During the preparations for the clash against Sahaquiel, the town of Matsushiro, where the second division of the Nerv is located, is also mentioned. In the real world, plans were made in the area of Matsushiro for the construction of underground imperial headquarters to be used after the Second World War.

== Reception ==
"She said, 'Don't make others suffer for your personal hatred'" was first broadcast on December 20, 1995, and drew a 7.4% audience share on Japanese television. In 1996 it ranked twelfth in the Anime Grand Prix, an annual poll by Animage magazine, in the best anime episodes category with 81 votes. Official merchandise about the episode has also been released, including a line of official T-shirts.

Some critics have negatively received "She said, 'Don't make others suffer for your personal hatred'". Akio Nagatomi of The Anime Café gave the episode a positive rating, but complained about the "pretty stock" plot. Screen Rant similarly criticized the battle against Sahaquiel as overly quick. Other reviewers positively commented on the installment. Film School Rejects' Max Covill praised "She said, 'Don't make others suffer for your personal hatred'", appreciating the focus on Misato's character and the finale, which he described as "one of the more uplifting endings in the series". Covill also listed a frame of Misato's flashback during Second Impact among the show's "perfect shots".

Matthew Garcia of Multiversity Comics lauded the use of music and silences. Digitally Obsessed Joel Cunningham also praised the episode; while "not a whole lot happens", according to Cunningham there are "a lot of nice character moments" with Shinji and Misato, and both of their characters are expanded nicely. Comic Book Resources ranked the clash between the three Evas and Sahaquiel third among the best of the show, describing it as "one of the most visually spectacular fights in the series"; Anime News Network's Theron Martin said that the battles presented in the eleventh and twelfth episodes are "suitably exciting and creative, and it's a bit of an extra thrill to finally get to see all three Evas operating in tandem".

Polygon compared the unfurled design of the flying cryptid movie monster Jean Jacket in Jordan Peele's Nope with Sahaquiel. On July 25, 2022, Slashfilm confirmed via Peele's production notes for Nope that Jean Jacket had been specifically inspired by the Angels of Neon Genesis Evangelion; Peele himself stated that he was particularly influenced by their "hyper minimalism" and "biomechanical design flair".
