= The Day Tokyo-3 Stood Still =

- Neon Genesis Evangelion episode
- Shinji Ikari, Rei Ayanami and Asuka Langley Soryu discuss the reasons for the attacks of the Angels lying on a hill as they see the stars of the Milky Way. Analyzing the scene, writer Dennis Redmond described Rei as a symbol of an empty and "lyric neonational interiority", while Asuka as a mirror of a pragmatic and "outrageous multinational exteriority".
- Episode no.: Episode 11
- Directed by: Tetsuya Watanabe
- Written by: Hideaki Anno, Yōji Enokido
- Original air date: December 13, 1995
- Running time: 22 minutes

Episode chronology
← Previous "Magmadiver"	Next → "She said, 'Don't make others suffer for your personal hatred.'"

''The Day Tokyo-3 Stood Still'', also known by the Japanese title "In the Still Darkness" (Note: Japanese: 静止した闇の中で, Hepburn: Seishishita yami no naka de) is the eleventh episode of the Japanese anime television series Neon Genesis Evangelion, which was created by animation studio Gainax. The episode, written by Hideaki Anno and Yōji Enokido and directed by Tetsuya Watanabe, was first broadcast on TV Tokyo on December 13, 1995. The series is set fifteen years after a worldwide cataclysm named Second Impact and is mostly set in the futuristic, fortified city of Tokyo-3. The series' protagonist is Shinji Ikari, a teenage boy who is recruited by his father Gendo to the special military organization Nerv to pilot a gigantic biomechanical mecha named Evangelion into combat with beings called Angels. In this episode, the special agency Nerv suddenly experiences a blackout due to sabotage by unidentified third parties. The three Evangelion mecha pilots, Shinji, Rei Ayanami and Asuka Langley Soryu, join forces to take down the ninth Angel, Matarael.

The episode, part of the series's action arc, blends comedy and action together and is markedly positive in its portrayal of the characters' relationships, particularly those of the three main characters. "The Day Tokyo-3 Stood Still" echoes Hideaki Anno's typical themes, seeking to philosophically explore the value of technology and its role in the contemporary world. Several companies were involved in the production of the episode, including Studio Ghibli.

"The Day Tokyo-3 Stood Still" drew a 9.0% audience share on Japanese television and was positively received by critics. Reviewers repeatedly praised Matarael's battle, pacing, script, positive tone, and the exploration of philosophical themes presented in the installment.

== Plot ==
Shinji Ikari, the pilot of the mecha Eva-01, calls his cold and distant father Gendo, the supreme commander of the special agency Nerv. The call is suddenly cut off; the headquarters and Tokyo-3 are left without power. Nerv's Major Misato Katsuragi and her former boyfriend Ryoji Kaji become trapped in the elevator, while Dr. Ritsuko Akagi and other Nerv members systematically rule out the possibility of an accident, thus coming to the conclusion that the blackout is the result of sabotage by third parties in order to investigate the Nerv headquarters facility. The ninth in a series of enemies of humankind called Angels, Matarael, arrives at Tokyo-3. Shinji, along with his fellow pilots Rei Ayanami and Asuka Langley Soryu, enters through an air duct at Nerv, while Gendo and other Nerv members manage to activate the Evangelions manually without the aid of electricity. Shinji, Rei, and Asuka together manage to take down Matarael, with Shinji delivering the killing blow from his rifle. The three pilots, lying on a knoll, see the lights of Tokyo-3 turn on again, while Shinji wonders what the reason is for the Angels' attacks.

== Production ==
In 1993, Gainax wrote a presentation document for Neon Genesis Evangelion entitled New Century Evangelion (tentative name) Proposal (新世紀エヴァンゲリオン (仮) 企画書, Shinseiki Evangelion (kari) kikakusho), containing the initial synopsis of "The Day Tokyo-3 Stood Still". The Proposal document was then published in 1994. In the authors' initial plan, the tenth episode would have seen Nerv headquarters stranded by an electrical blackout, while the eleventh would have involved an attempt to capture an Angel in the magma chamber of an active volcano. During the course of the work, however, the episodes were reversed in order, so the capture attempt was moved to "Magmadiver". The Japanese title of the episode was already provided in the Proposal, but written with a comma as 静止した、 闇の中で (Seishishita, yaminonakade; lit. 'Still, in the darkness'). The English title of the episode at the storyboard stage was "Panic in Geo Front", and only at a later stage did the staff decide to change it. Hideaki Anno, the series' main director, and Yōji Enokido wrote the script; Masayuki handled the storyboards. Tetsuya Watanabe served as director, while Toshio Kawagushi worked as chief animator.

The production process involved Studio Deen, Kenichi Yoshida, and Studio Fantasia, among others. Studio Ghibli also helped in the animation process of the episode. The staff chose to include several humorous gags throughout "The Day Tokyo-3 Stood Still"; because of animation director Toshio Kawagushi, the graphic rendering of the final result deviated from the other episodes in the series. The announcer character in the truck which Hyuga boards, for example, was rendered in a style typical of the Ghibli studio. A shot of the Milky Way was included in the final scene of the episode, and according to the series filmbooks the staff may have depicted the galaxy respecting the geography of the world of Evangelion, in which the Second Impact changed the Earth's axial tilt. The filmbooks also noted how in the installment Anno reflected his passion for railroads, Kazuya Tsurumaki his love for astronomy, and character designer of the series Yoshiyuki Sadamoto his passion for motoring.

The original script featured scenes that were later cut during the course of the work. The original draft included more scenes of Misato and Kaji trapped in an elevator and a scene in which Rei explains to her fellow pilots that the corridors to Nerv headquarters were made especially intricate to prevent terrorist attacks. The episode's draft also included more dialogue among the Nerv staff establishing that the cause of Nerv's malfunction was human, as well as an early mention of the Super Solenoid Engine, a power system recovered from Angel Shamshel's remains. Moreover, in the final scene, Shigeru Aoba would play an acoustic version of "A Cruel Angel's Thesis" on his guitar. Kōichi Yamadera, Miki Nagasawa, Yūko Miyamura, Megumi Hayashibara, Kotono Mitsuishi, voice actors of several main characters in the series, played unidentified characters for "The Day Tokyo-3 Stood Still", along with Kōichi Nagano, Hidenari Ugaki, Tomomichi Nishimura, and Akiko Yajima. In addition to the original soundtrack, composed by Shirō Sagisu, the song "You are the only one" by Kotono Mitsuishi, Misato's original voice actress, was used in the scene where Makoto Hyuga picks up Misato's laundry. Claire Littley also sang a version of "Fly Me to the Moon" used as the episode's final theme song for the original broadcast, while in the late home video releases a version named "Rei, Asuka, Misato Ver." was used instead.

== Cultural references, style and themes ==
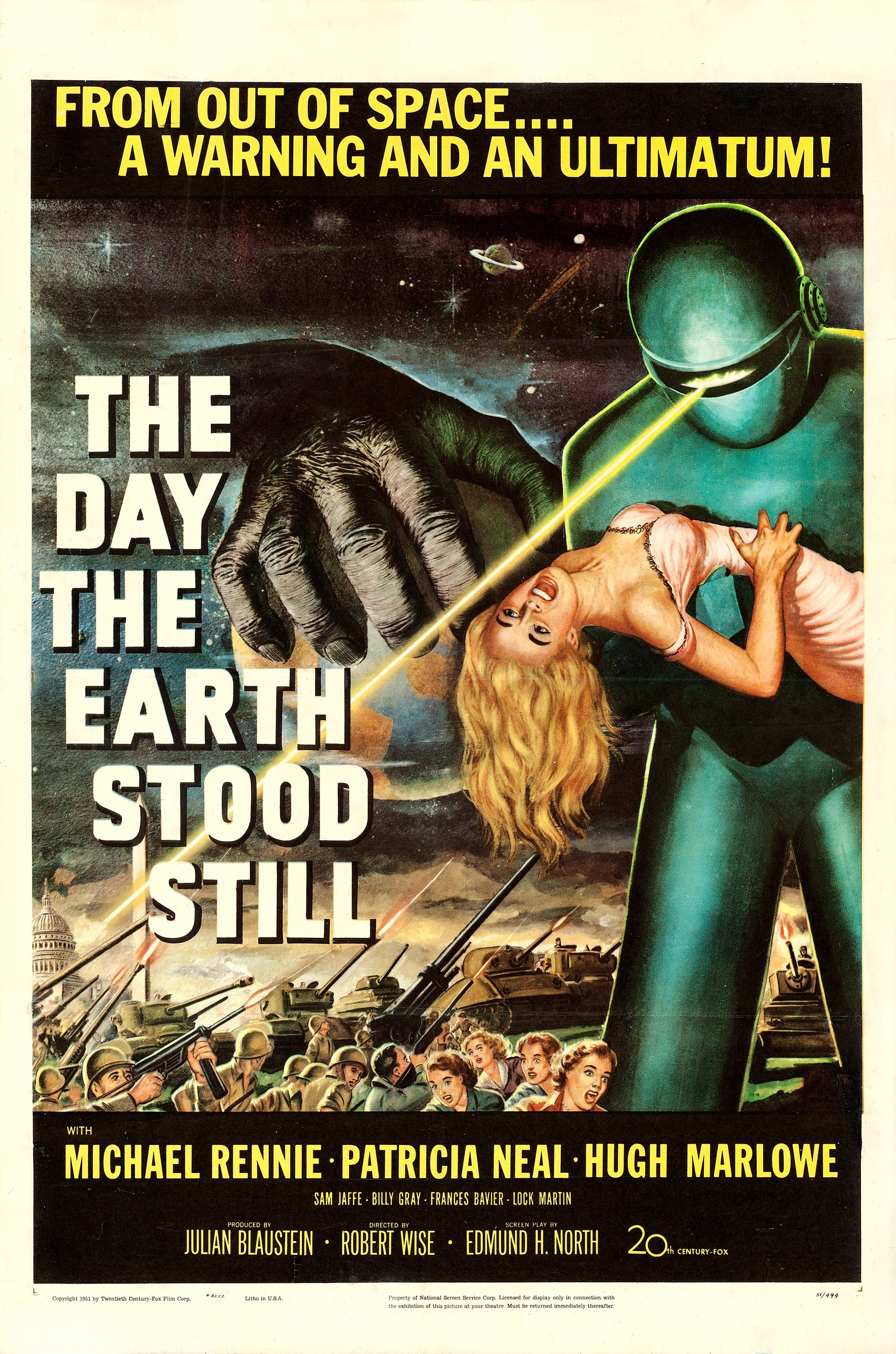
The English title of the episode is inspired by the film "The Day the Earth Stood Still" (1951).

In the first scene of "The Day Tokyo-3 Stood Still", Maya praises the qualities of science with a phrase already used by Anno in his previous anime, Nadia: The Secret of Blue Water. The installment, in which Gendo and Ritsuko struggle to prepare the giant Evas for combat without the benefit of modern technology, reflects the director's epistemological interest, philosophically investigating the qualities or flaws of science and its relationship to man. As with other episodes, its title constitutes a reference to an existing film, The Day the Earth Stood Still (1951), reflecting Anno's interest in science fiction. Writer Álvaro Arbonés interpreted it as a reference to Giant Robo: The Day the Earth Stood Still. In the course of the episode, cans of the UCC Ueshima Coffee Co. brand —spelled as ICC— are shown, similarly to another earlier work by Anno, Gunbuster. The name of the Tokyo-3 election candidate, Nozoku Takahashi, is also a reference to a Ghibli studio producer, Nozomu Takahashi.

The episode, part of the series' action arc, features a fusion of comic tones and a strong action component. It depicts for the first time the three pilots of the Evangelion mechas acting in unison, and positively portrays the interpersonal relationships of the main characters. The episode opens with Shinji attempting to call his father from a public payphone before Nerv's blackout interrupts the call. Slant Magazine writer Michael Peterson interpreted the payphone as a symbol that illustrates "Shinji's disconnect from his father." Gendo, usually emotionally unapproachable and cold, later shows an unusually human and responsible face by helping his subordinates at Nerv to manually operate the Eva. Shinji himself is surprised, and their relationships seem to be closer than in the previous episodes. Gendo's behavior is compared to that of Rei, who displays great calm in the face of an emergency situation. Rei's attitude arouses Asuka's ire, who initially insults her colleague by calling her "Miss Perfect" (優等生, yūtōsei; literally "honor student"), a Japanese term for diligent model students held up as role models in Japanese society. Asuka also seems to grow closer and accept Rei as her own teammate at the end of the episode. Japanese academic Yuya Sato noted how "The Day Tokyo-3 Stood Still" notably features elements typical of anime for boys, known as shōnen, although Neon Genesis Evangelion, especially in its second part, has many elements for girls' comics, named shōjo manga. They would therefore, according to Sato, constitute a lure to attract men to shōjo. Academic Katherine Savoy also noted that female figures take initiative in the episode, often explicitly against orders, to retake the base and protect the city from the incoming Angel.

Asuka's behavior in "The Day Tokyo-3 Stood Still" and the following episode has been traced back to "masculine protest", a psychological term for a form of rebellion identifiable in women who are tired of the role stereotypically associated with the female gender. Asuka acts as if she is trying to prove herself and surpass the male gender, fusing an inferiority complex and radical rivalry. She also takes on the most dangerous role in the plan she herself devised for the final battle against Matarael in the episode as a way of repaying Shinji for rescuing her in the previous episode's ending scene. Furthermore, Shinji wonders why humanity fights the Angels in the course of the episode. According to writer Rob Vuckovich, his attitude suggests that God is "virtually nonexistent" in the world of Evangelion, or indifferent to human affairs, as Nerv's motto suggests, "God's in His Heaven, All's right with the World". In the final scene, Rei argues that "in order to survive, humanity has driven out darkness with fire", while Asuka mocks her by saying, "Philosophy, huh?". Newtype magazine pointed out that Rei sees the world with the innocent eyes of a child. Anime Feminist website writers similarly noted how Asuka clearly just followes orders, since she has been training for a really long time and hasn't really questioned her pilot role. Analyzing the scene, writer Dennis Redmond described Rei as a symbol of an empty and "lyric neonational interiority", while Asuka as a mirror of a pragmatic and "outrageous multinational exteriority". Redmond also noted how Tokyo-3 has been immobilized not "by inimical aliens, but by human beings themselves". For Arbonés, the series can be viewed as a reinterpretation of the Greek myth of Prometheus; the following episode also introduces the possibility that God may punish humanity for its arrogant attempt to appropriate divine power. According to writer Yoshihiro Tanigawa, cities are depicted as symbols of the human ego trying to defend itself from the outside world.

== Reception ==
"The Day Tokyo-3 Stood Still" was first broadcast on December 13, 1995, and drew a 9.0% audience share on Japanese television, the second highest for an episode of Neon Genesis Evangelion to date. Merchandise on the episode has also been released. Matarael's design inspired Nobuhiro Watsuki to create the eye costume of Usui Uonuma, one of the characters in the manga Rurouni Kenshin.

"The Day Tokyo-3 Stood Still" received a positive critical reception. Jalopnik.com, for example, described it as a "fantastic episode". Digitally Obsessed! reviewer Jeff Ulmer gave a positive review of the home video issue with "The Day Tokyo-3 Stood Still" and its action arc for its humour and characterization. Akio Nagatomi of The Anime Café, normally critical of the series, appreciated the pace of the script, and while noting flaws he said that "the weaknesses take a back seat to the stronger script writing, and the excellent pace set by the director". Film School Rejects' Max Covill said, "This episode stands out because of the subtle character moments between the three children". Matthew Garcia of Multiversity Comics similarly praised the use of music and silences. Looper described Matarael as a "profoundly brilliant and disgusting in equal measure" enemy. Its fight against the three Evas has been praised by Screen Rant and listed among the best battles in the series. Screen Rant also singled out the episode's animation, calling the fluidity of its movement "striking" and describing it as a clear step up from the series' usual visual quality. Anime News Network's Martin Theron said that the battle presented in "The Day Tokyo-3 Stood Still" is "suitably exciting and creative, and it's a bit of an extra thrill to finally get to see all three Evas operating in tandem". Screen Rant lauded its "really satisfying conclusion". Yahoo! website described it as an "enjoyable monster-of-the-week installment", and while criticizing some "odd-looking off-model drawings", it still lauded it for its "great character interactions".
