= Magmadiver =

- Neon Genesis Evangelion episode
- Asuka Langley Soryu showing her swimsuit, designed by Takeshi Honda, to Shinji Ikari discussing on thermal expansion. The presence of fan service has been criticized by some viewers and reviewers.
- Episode no.: Episode 10
- Directed by: Tsuyoshi Kaga, Kiroyuki Ishido
- Written by: Hideaki Anno, Akio Satsukawa
- Original air date: December 6, 1995
- Running time: 22 minutes

Episode chronology
← Previous "Both of You, Dance Like You Want to Win!"	Next → "The Day Tokyo-3 Stood Still"

"Magmadiver" (Note: Japanese: マグマダイバー, Hepburn: Magumadaibā) is the tenth episode of the Japanese anime television series Neon Genesis Evangelion, which was created by animation studio Gainax. The episode, written by Hideaki Anno and Akio Satsukawa and directed by Tsuyoshi Kaga and Kiroyuki Ishido, was first broadcast on TV Tokyo on December 6, 1995. The series is set fifteen years after a worldwide cataclysm and is mostly set in the futuristic, fortified city of Tokyo-3. The series' protagonist is Shinji Ikari, a teenage boy who is recruited by his father Gendo to the special military organization Nerv to pilot a gigantic biomechanical mecha named Evangelion into combat with beings called Angels. During the episode, Asuka Langley Soryu, a girl who is designated as the pilot of Evangelion Unit-02, tries to capture the eighth Angel, Sandalphon, found in the magma chamber of a volcano in a dormant state.

The episode continues the so-called 'action arc' of the series, making room for humor and teenage tones. The basic plot of "Magmadiver" took inspiration from a documentary called Life: A Long Journey of 4 Billion Years by NHK, and critics and official material on the series found references to trilobites, The Andromeda Strain, and previous works by the Gainax studio.

"Magmadiver" drew a 9.5% audience share on Japanese television, the highest for an episode of Neon Genesis Evangelion to date. It received an ambivalent or negative reception from critics, as it was considered filler and full of excessive fan service; the addition of erotic elements primarily used to please the audience. Other reviewers received the installment more positively, praising the humor, the battle against Sandalphon, and Shinji's actions.

== Plot ==
Shinji Ikari, pilot of the mecha Eva-01, and Asuka Langley Soryu, his fellow pilot deputed to command the Evangelion Unit-02, continue their cohabitation at the home of Misato Katsuragi of the special agency Nerv, deputed to the annihilation of the Angels. While their companions go on a trip to Okinawa, the two pilots remain in the city of Tokyo-3 in case of an enemy attack.

Meanwhile, Sandalphon, an Angel in a dormant state, enclosed in a chrysalis-like cocoon, is detected by the seismographic center of Mount Asama and Misato. Nerv therefore decides to undertake an action to capture the dormant Angel. To do so, Asuka and the Eva-02 are equipped with a special pressure and lava-resistant suit, the Type D equipment. Asuka then dives into the volcanic magma chamber and captures the Angel. After capturing it, however, the Angel wakes up and attacks the Eva. Asuka, exploiting the principles of thermal expansion, defeats the enemy, and Shinji rescues her with his Eva-01 before she can become trapped in the magma.

== Production ==
In 1993, Gainax wrote a presentation document for Neon Genesis Evangelion entitled New Century Evangelion (tentative name) Proposal (新世紀エヴァンゲリオン (仮) 企画書, Shinseiki Evangelion (kari) kikakusho) to find potential sponsors for the series, containing the initial synopsis for the planned episodes. The Proposal document was then published in 1994, and it already included the "Magmadiver" plot. The original plan was for an episode centered on a magma fight to be the eleventh episode and an episode on a Nerv blackout to be the tenth one. During production, however, the episodes were reversed; what was supposed to be the eleventh episode became the tenth, while the draft on the tenth episode's blackout was used for "The Day Tokyo-3 Stood Still". In the Proposal document, moreover, the seventeenth episode was also supposed to feature a romance comedy about Asuka's first date; some of the elements of the initial scenario then flowed into the tenth episode, especially in the scene where Asuka goes shopping with Kaji. "Magmadiver" was written by Akio Satsukawa in collaboration with Hideaki Anno, the director of the series, while the storyboards were edited by Anno himself and Tsuyoshi Kaga. Anno also worked on Sandalphon's design. Kaga and Hiroyuki Ishido worked together as the directors, while Shigeta Satoshi served as the chief animator. Takeshi Honda designed Asuka's swimsuit, while Seiji Kio and Mitsumu Wogi worked as the assistant character designers. Tomokazu Seki, Junko Iwao, Megumi Hayashibara, and Tetsuya Iwanaga, voice actors of several main characters in the series, played unidentified characters for "Magmadiver". Moreover, songs from Lila ~ from Ys, an album by Misato's voice actress Kotono Mitsuishi, were used during the episode. Yōko Takahashi also sang the final theme song of the installment, a cover of the song "Fly Me to the Moon", later replaced with a version named "Asuka Main" in subsequent home video editions.

Writer Alexandre Marine noted how "Magmadiver" is one of the few episodes which is faithful to Gainax's original plan. The basic plot of "Magmadiver", centered on the character of Asuka, the focus of the series' "action arc", was written with a simple structure, featuring the classic beginning-development-end unfolding. The defeat of the Angel is made possible by a creative application of a basic lesson of thermodynamics mentioned in the previous scenes, reprising the classic robot anime plot scheme of the 1970s, in which an element presented at the beginning of an episode becomes useful as a resolution to the concluding fight. In the episode's original draft, the students of Tokyo-3 would have traveled to Okinawa by ferry rather than by plane; Asuka would have addressed Rei by name, and Kaji would have spoken with a man rather than a woman aboard the cable car. Gainax also planned a scene in which Makoto, Shigeru, and Ritsuko play golf at the Karuizawa Country Club, as well as a final scene at sunset showing the Evangelion units in poor condition after the descent into Mount Asama. The original plan also called for Shinji's Eva-01, rather than Eva-02, to be endangered by the magma, with Eva-02 instead coming to its rescue. For "Magmadiver", the staff designed a special aircraft for transporting the Evangelion units; Gainax had already introduced it in a scene from the series' seventh episode, and its design drew inspiration from the Northrop YB-49. For the plot the staff also took inspiration from an NHK special called Life: A Long Journey of 4 Billion Years, which aired in Japan in 1994. Life features, among others, the prehistoric animal Anomalocaris, which inspired Sandalphon's appearance. For the fight against Sandalphon, set in Mount Asama, special water glass was used to create a distortion effect. A distorted cry of an infant was also used for the Angel's vocalizations at the start of the battle.

== Cultural references and themes ==
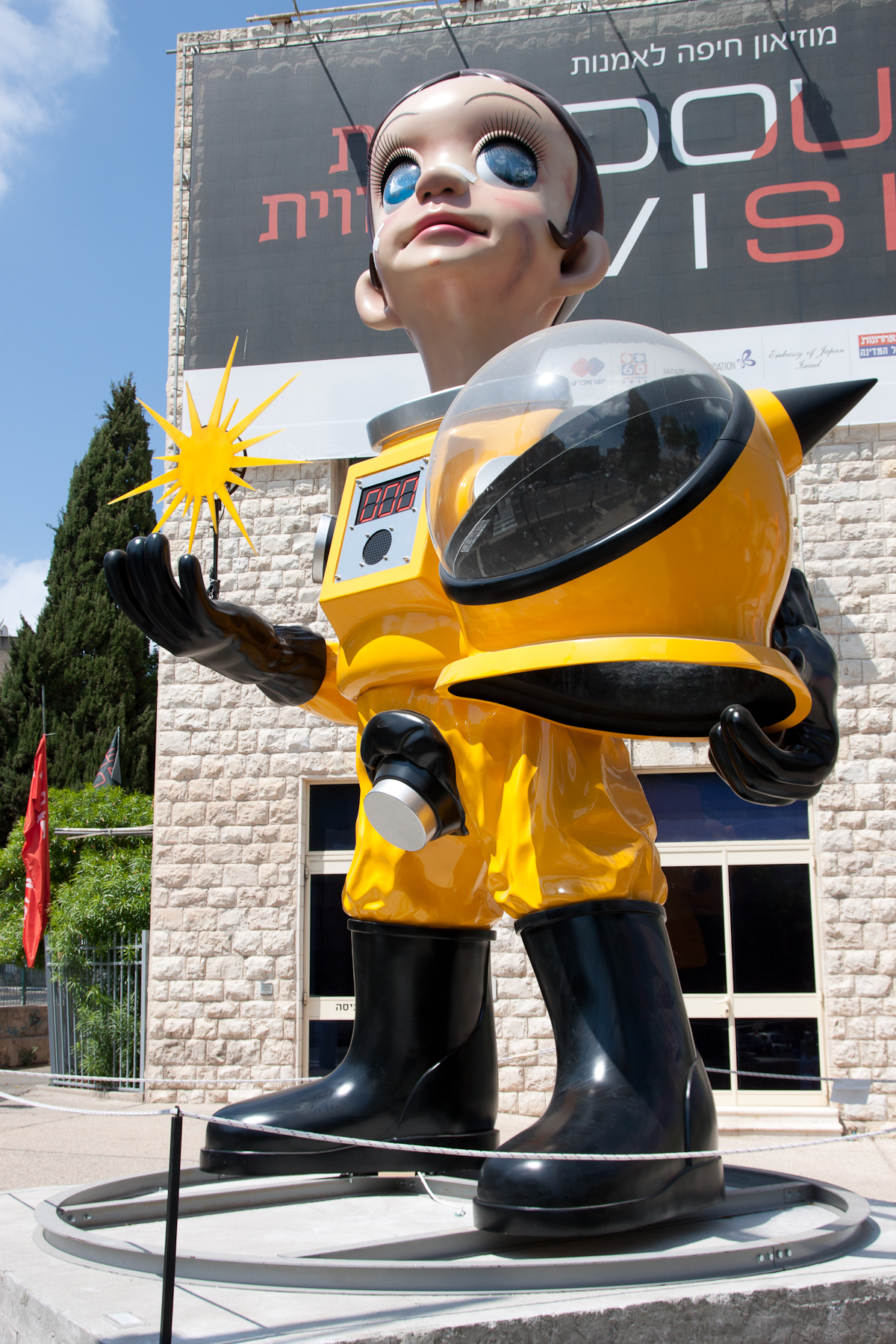
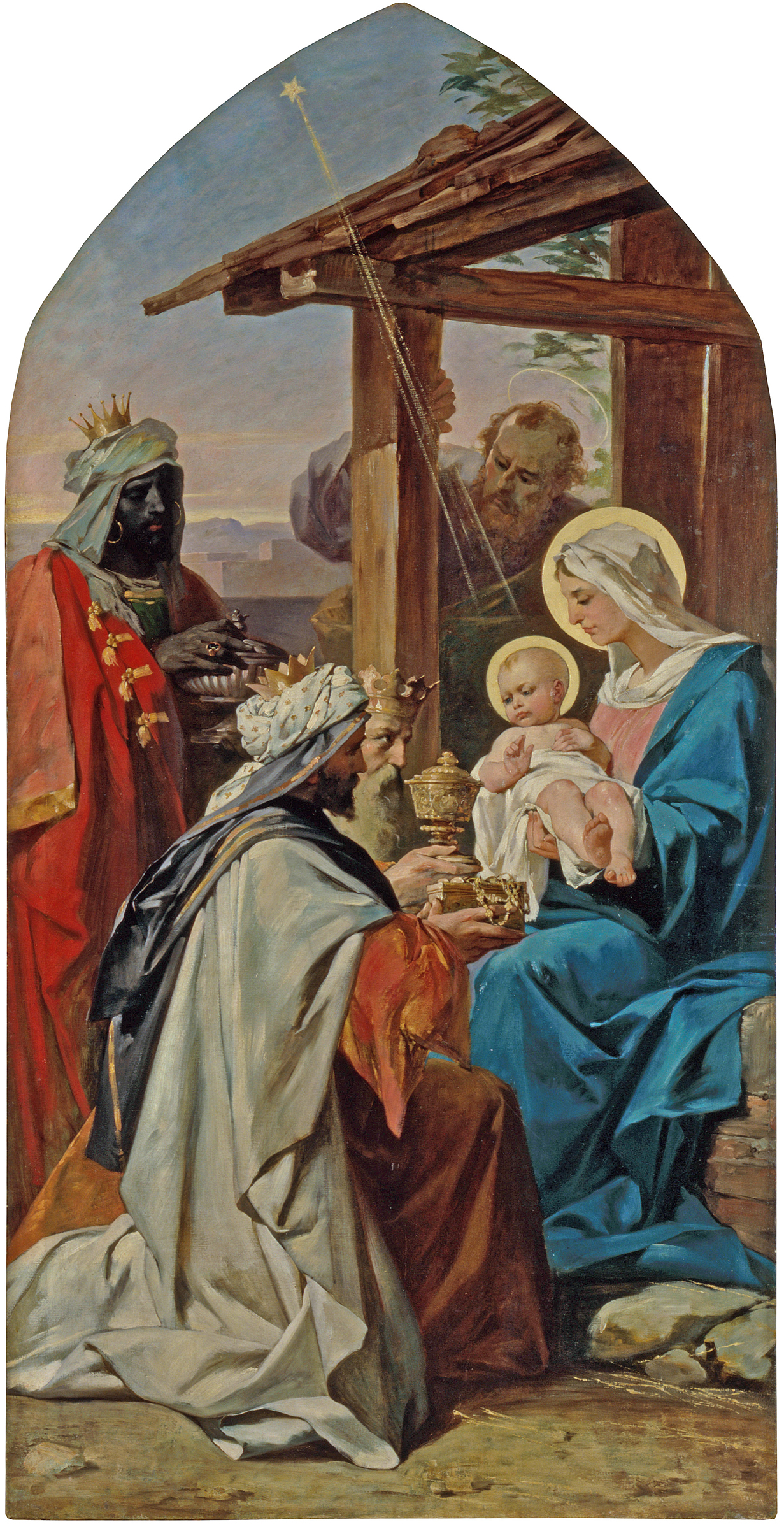
Critics and official materials on the series have identified references to trilobites, the works of Kenji Yanobe and the biblical Magi in 'Magmadiver'.

The episode contains several references to works of fiction or real existing elements, such as the biblical Magi, the film Blue Christmas, and names used in diving competitions. The Boa beer that Misato drinks in the first scene refers to the Boa juice that appears in the anime movie Flying Phantom Ship (1969), while the name of the Kermadec-3 probe, used for the Angel Sandalphon investigation, comes from the volcanic Kermadec Islands in New Zealand. The name Kermadec is also mentioned in the television series Japan Sinks and in an episode of Gainax's Nadia: The Secret of Blue Water. When Asuka complains about the Japanese school system, Misato responds by telling her, "When in the village, follow the village". The phrase is a proverb from an ancient Japanese text called Dojikyo (童子教). The scenes in which Misato requests the A-17 order and Shinji spots UN planes in the sky are an homage to The Andromeda Strain (1971). Anime critic Ryōta Fujitsu compared the episode's final scene, in which Misato briefly alludes to her past at the hot springs, to other works by Hideaki Anno, noting that they often feature scenes in which characters reveal their true feelings while bathing. In Gunbuster, for example, Noriko and Kazumi deepen their bond with Jung Freud while talking in a large bath, whereas in Nadia: The Secret of Blue Water Electra reveals her tragic past while bathing aboard the Nautilus. Moreover, the Type D equipment has been compared with the works of Kenji Yanobe, a Japanese artist popular within the otaku subculture.

According to Evangelion Chronicle, an official encyclopedia of the series, "Magmadiver" features a storyline that offers a glimpse into the characters' everyday lives, highlighting ordinary moments such as Asuka's friendship with Hikari Horaki and her upbeat attitude as she tries to enjoy herself despite missing the school field trip. Shinji, by contrast, almost paranoically assumes that Nerv will assign him the mission against Sandalphon, only for Asuka to take his place; the experience makes him realize that Nerv does not intend to place the entire burden on his shoulders. Kaji secretly meets an informant aboard a cable car, a plot element later reprised in the fifteenth episode of the series, while Asuka decides to pilot Eva-02 out of her sense of rivalry with Rei. The magazine also argues that the episode's final scene, which shows Misato's naked body, goes beyond simple fan service, as it explores her past and her connection to the Second Impact. "Magmadiver" also introduces elements regarding the mysteries and the scenario of the series, such as the origin of the Angels. According to a guide on the original series contained in the game Neon Genesis Evangelion RPG, the Sandalphon episode suggests dormant, larval Angels are hidden around the world. An official encyclopedia on the series links this with the biblical Book of Enoch, in which the word "Heaven", the abode of angels, actually refers to an Earthly location; because Sandalphon is discovered in the magma chamber of a volcano, Evangelion Angels exist "in the same world as ours". Sandalphon itself is inspired by prehistoric or living creatures, such as the common dab and trilobites. According to writer Virginie Nebbia, for Sandalphon's battle staff took inspiration from the novel Sundiver by David Brin. Hideaki Anno confirmed in an interview that he took inspiration from Brin's book for the episode title, but that he never read it. Nebbia also compared the scene in which Asuka's plugsuit inflates with Akio Jissōji's work on Ultraman, in which the enemy Skydon inflates in a comical way, and the soundtrack "Magmadiver" with the music from James Bond movies.

"Magmadiver", like the previous two episodes, has a light, humorous tone and a strong action component, with a predominant focus on the psychology of Asuka's character. Comic Book Resources' Devin Meenan described the installment as "the closest Evangelion gets to filler", and the battle against Sandalphon as "one of the more conventional of the series". Dengeki Online noted how the episodes from "Asuka Strikes!" to "Magmadiver" have a "classic shōnen mecha charm". Japanese academic Yuya Sato similarly noted how "Magmadiver" notably features elements typical of shōnen manga, although Evangelion, especially in its second part, has many elements for girls' comics, named shōjo manga. They would therefore, according to Sato, constitute a lure to attract men to shōjo. According to DVD Talk, the arc adds a lot more "heart and soul" to the story, with a combination of action, comedy and even dramatic moments. In the last scene, moreover, Asuka and Misato talk during sunset, and Asuka reveals that she has a past that she doesn't want to show to other people. According to writer Dennis Redmond, "the motif of the fading sun is not an accident"; this moment of "relative equilibrium", where the various registers of comedy and tragedy, childhood and adulthood, seem to coexist "in relative harmony", is slowly disintegrated in future episodes. Animedia magazine how Misato also has a scar on her chest, foreshadowing a revelation in the twelfth episode, and how Asuka begins to take an interest in Shinji. Writer Andrew M. Winters similarly noted that Asuka unsuccessfully flirts with Shinji and attempts to get his attention; Shinji is tempted by her and only able to act when he's not being watched. For Winters, their dynamic culminates in an "infamous sequence" in the End of Evangelion (1997) movie. According to writer Álvaro Arbonés, since the first scene, in which Asuka shows her new swimsuit to Kaji, Asuka's desire to be admired by others is the episode's core. Anime Feminist website writers similarly noted how in the scene Kaji does not give in to Asuka's filtering behavior, telling her that such a costume is inappropriate for her age and treating her like a child instead. The episode also depicts Asuka as childish and insecure; Shinji, on the other hand, shows a clear sexual interest in her. At the end of the battle against Sandalphon, Asuka resigns herself to death but is saved by Shinji and changes her facial expression; for Arbonés, she is no longer the same person, as she realizes her feelings for Shinji.

== Reception ==
"Magmadiver" was first broadcast on December 6, 1995, and drew a 9.5% audience share on Japanese television, the highest for an episode of Neon Genesis Evangelion to date. Merchandise on the episode has also been released, including a line of official T-shirts. Moreover, according to the website Usgamer, a reference to the Type D equipment can be found in the Gold Saucer of the video game Final Fantasy VII.

The episode had a mixed reception from anime critics. Max Covil of Film School Rejects criticised the episode for the presence of fan service, arguing that it did not live up to the previous two. The Anime Café's Akio Nagatomi described "Magmadiver" as "the Japanese equivalent of a Saturday-morning special - not bad, but not spectacular". The writers of Screen Rant ranked the confrontation against Sandalphon among the lowest on the list of best battles in the series. Yahoo wrote, "Pretty funny by the low standards of horndog anime, but with one of the weakest Angel battles in the series, the episode offers little reason to revisit". Digitally Obsessed! reviewer Jeff Ulmer gave a positive review of the home video issue with "Magmadiver" and its action arc for its humour and characterization. Otaquest editor Jacob Parker-Dalton noted how the episode is hated in the fanbase, but defended it and praised the tension of the battle in the magma chamber, while the Supanova Expo website mentioned Shinji's rescue of Asuka as one of the character's best moments.
