= Small Worlds Miniature Museum =

Miniature museum in Koto City, Tokyo

- スモールワールズ
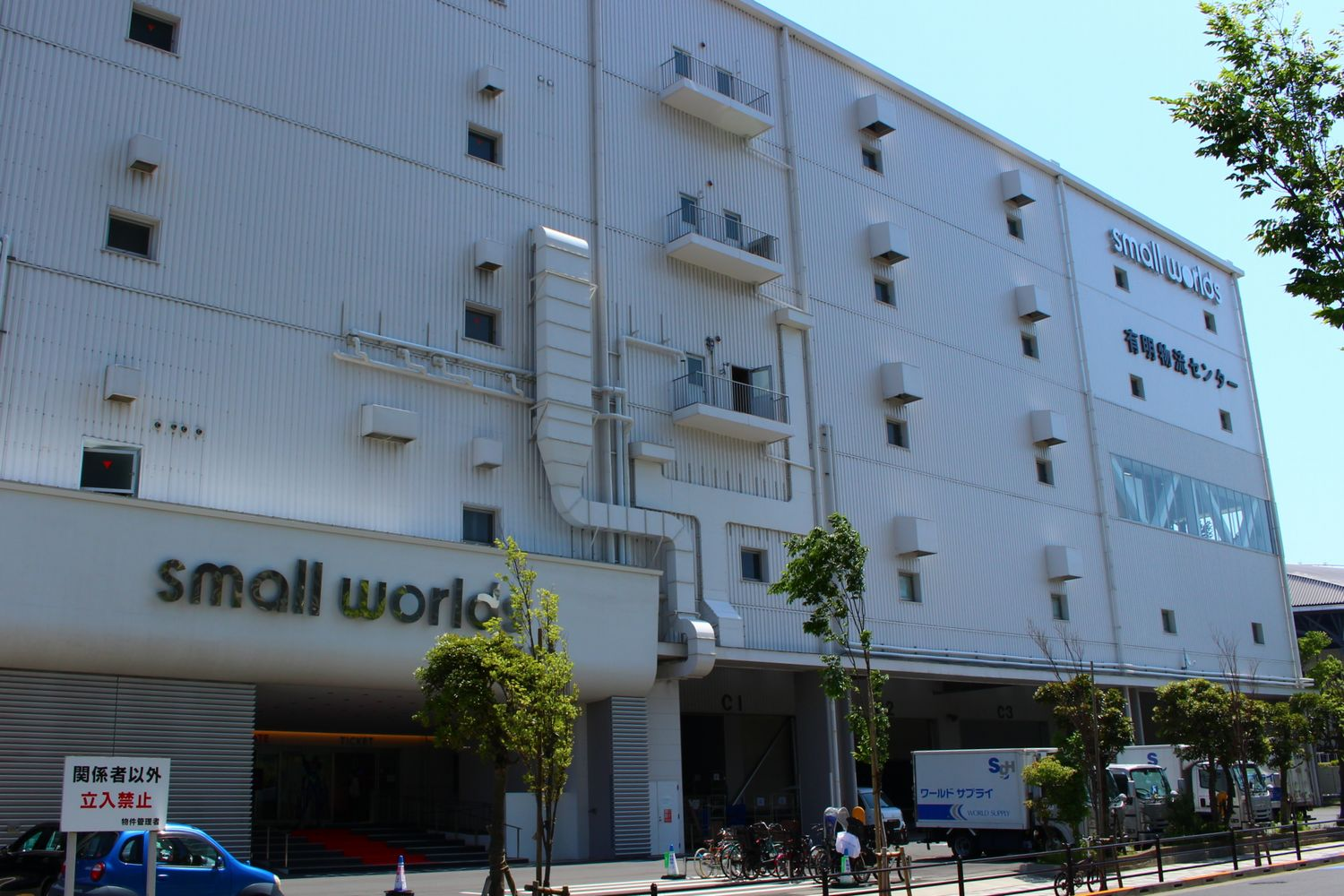
- Exterior of the museum in 2022
- Interactive map of the Small Worlds Miniature Museum area

General information
- Location: Tokyo-to, Koto-ku, Ariake 1-3-33 Ariake Butsuryu Center
- Coordinates: 35.6381°N 139.7883°E
- Opened: 11 July 2020

Website
- smallworlds.jp

Small Worlds Miniature Museum (stylized as SMALL WORLDS Miniature Museum) is a museum of miniature models in the Ariake district of Kōtō, Tokyo. Opened in 2020 with approximately 7,000 square meters of floor space, it is the largest miniature museum in Asia.

== History ==
Initially delayed for months because of the COVID-19 pandemic, Small Worlds opened on 11 June 2020, in line with the rest of Tokyo's reopening efforts. Upon its grand opening, a six-feet-tall Eva Unit-01 figure was available for sale starting at 2,600,000 Japanese yen, or $24,300, with a full specification of the model costing 3,400,000 yen ($31,775). Only 20 units were produced.

== Structure ==
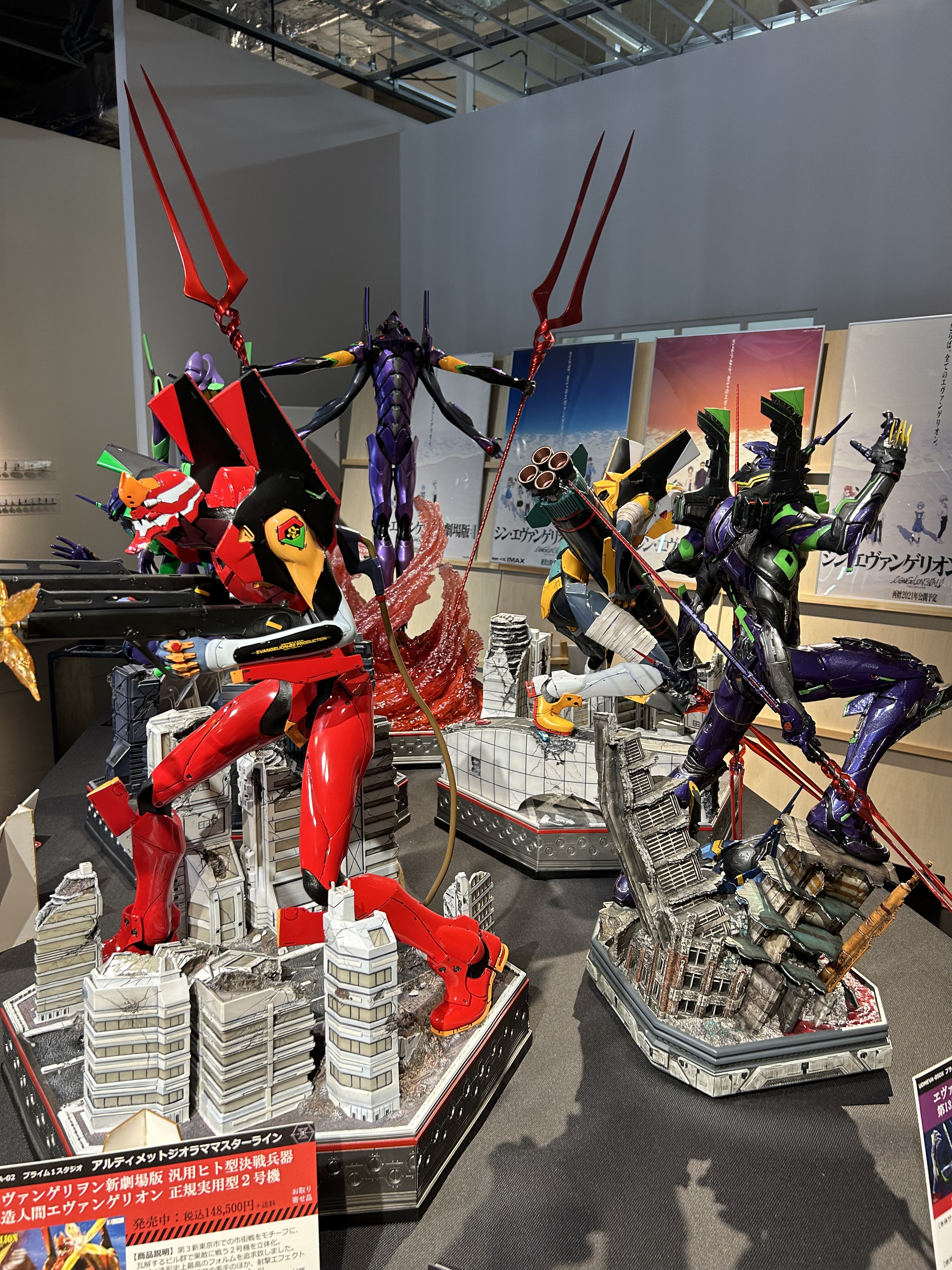
Various Neon Genesis Evangelion figures

The museum consists of three floors. The entrance and gift shop are on the first floor, while a café is located on the second floor. (The second floor hosts a "Nightlife in Japan" installation.) Exhibitions, interactive spaces, classrooms, and other venues are on the third floor.

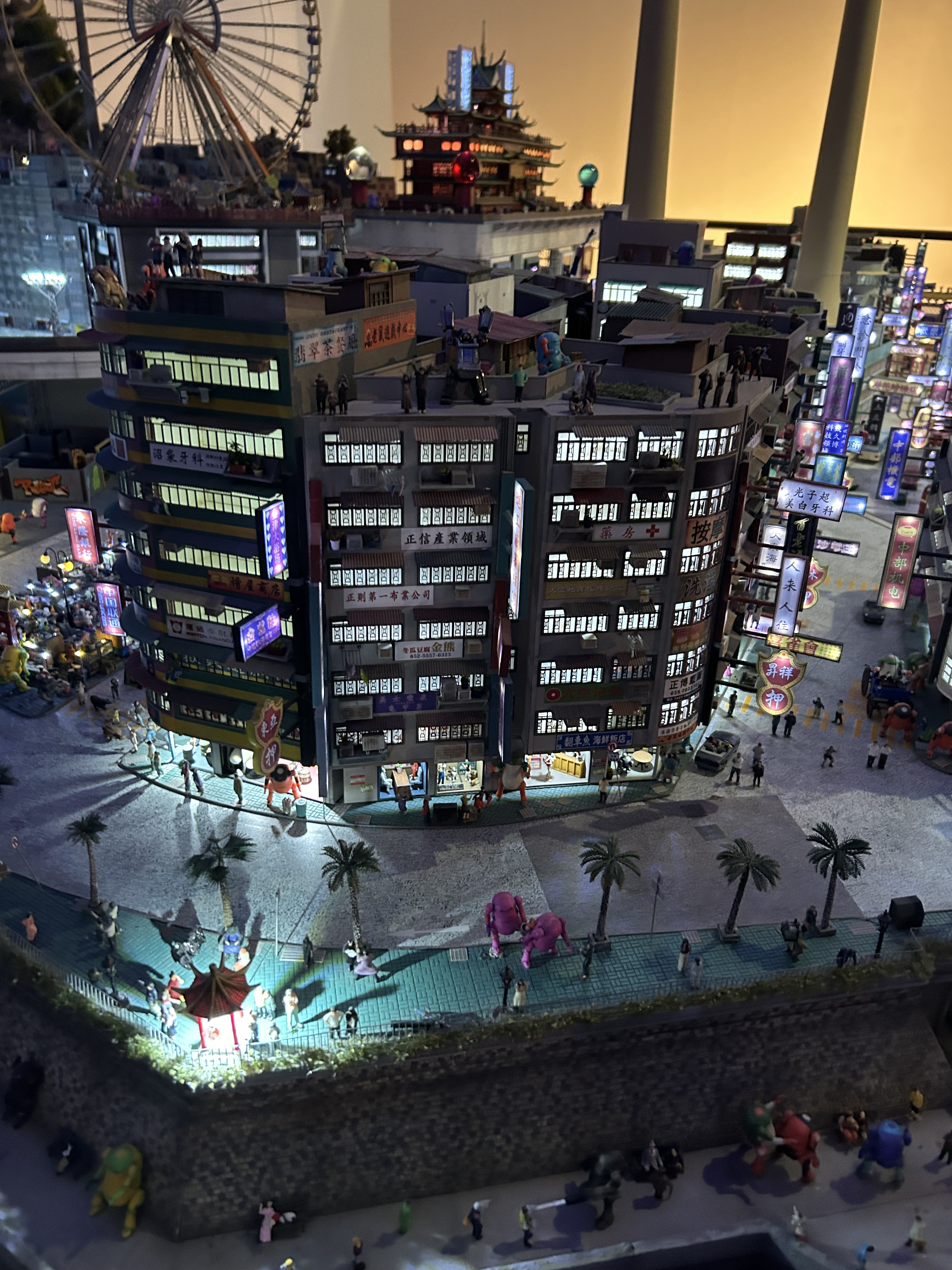
A building in the global village exhibition

=== Main installations ===
Each exhibition is hosted in a separate room. The exhibitions not only consist of miniature versions of buildings and people but also have interactive buttons to trigger certain events on each landscape, as well as moving parts and sometimes built-in "day and night cycles."

- Space center
- Global village
- Diaclone
- Sailor Moon
- Ariake Arena
- Neon Genesis Evangelion
- Creators gallery
- Kansai International Airport (KIX)

=== Interactive installations ===
Small Worlds offers several workshops for visitors to work on and create models of their own.

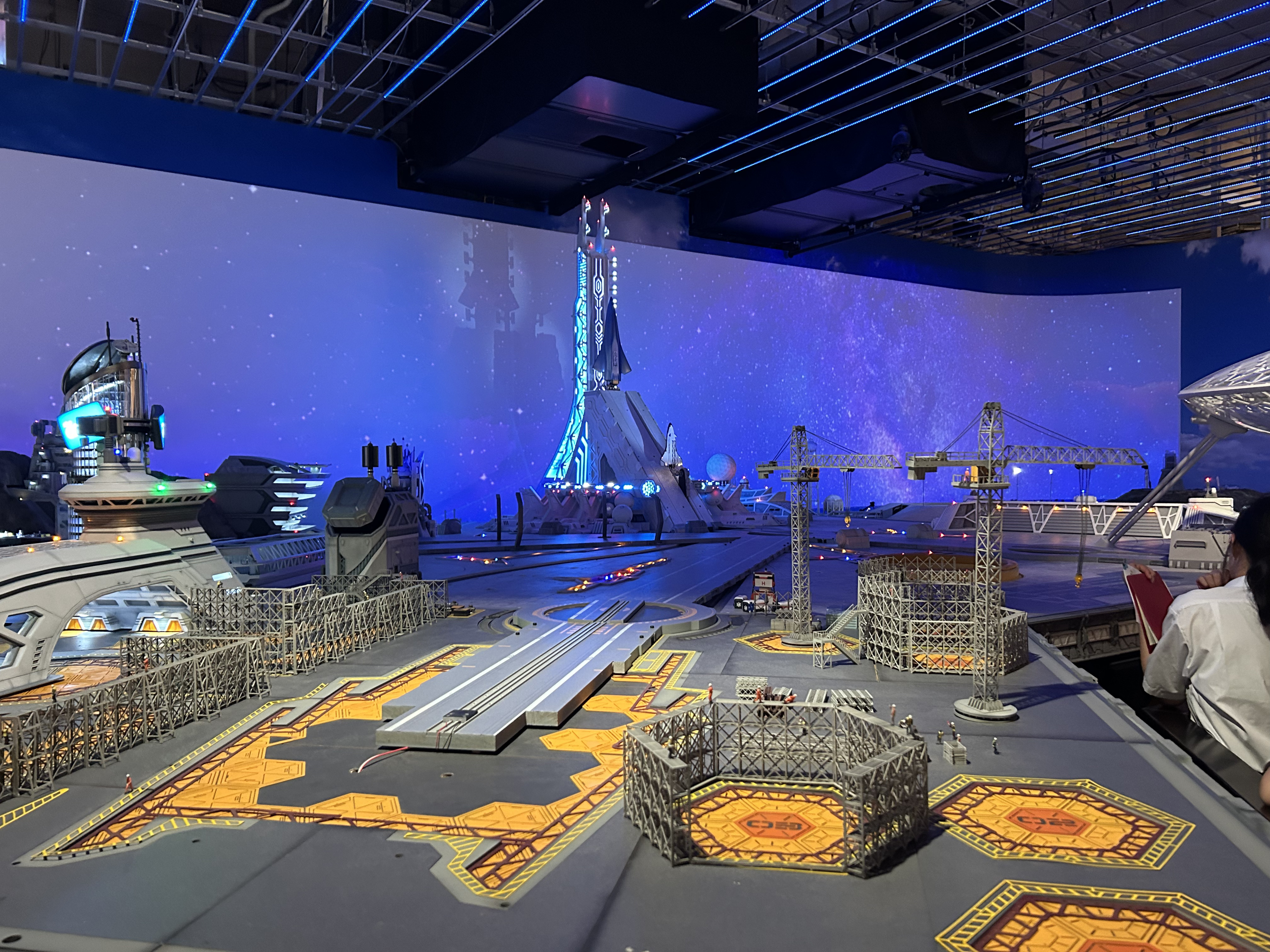
A space shuttle about to take off from the space center

Visitors can enter a 3D scanning device in order to generate a virtual model of themselves to print into a mini-figure, at 1:80, 1:35, or 1:24 scale, for a small fee. Through the Figure Program with Residency Rights, visitors can also have their figures placed within one of the museum's non-anime exhibitions for upwards of a year. Placing a figure in a Neon Genesis Evangelion and Sailor Moon locations costed more and were only available for a limited time.

=== Creative Studio ===
Through certain hallways, visitors can observe "artisans and engineers" creating the museum's pieces in real time and look at work-in-progress installations.

== Limited-time collaborations ==
=== Events ===
Small Worlds has hosted musical and concert events. Regularly, the museum also hosts group visits, field trips, and other educational programs. In March 2024, Small Worlds collaborated with the Railway Research Club of the Shibaura Institute of Technology Junior and Senior High School to host spring break workshops for elementary school students. Similarly, in August 2024, the museum hosted an Elementary School Summer Vacation where students and parents could participate in modeling activities.

On certain days of each month, visitors can bring their pets.

=== 2024 ===
- Pui Pui Molcar
  - 30 November 2024–January 31, 2024
- Diaclone x Small Worlds
  - 28 October 2024–November 30, 2024
- SMALL WORLDS x Alice Gear Aegis
  - 15 October 2024–November 18, 2024
- Wonderful Pretty Cure!
  - 13 September 2024–October 27, 2024
- Evangelion Mini Human Instrumentality Project
  - 20 July 2024–September 1, 2024
- Porno Graffitti x Ariake Arena Concert
  - 30 March 2024–May 6, 2024
- Cityscape Studio
  - 1 June 2024–July 15, 2024
- Prima Meat Packers
  - 27 April 2024–May 29, 2024
- CMYK Institute
  - 20 March 2024 – 20 April 2024
- Paranormasight
  - 9 March 2024–April 26, 2024
- Art Moving Center
  - 20 January 2024–February 18, 2024
