= Evangelion (mecha) =

Fictional cyborgs in Neon Genesis Evangelion

All Evangelion units from the original series, as depicted in an official art from the Evangelion Chronicle encyclopedia. Clockwise, from the top: Eva01, 00, 03, 02 and 04. In the background, the nine mass-produced units of the Eva Series.

The Evangelions (エヴァンゲリオン, Evangerion), also referred to as Evas, are fictional biomechanical humanoid mechas introduced in the anime television series Neon Genesis Evangelion, produced by Gainax and directed by Hideaki Anno and in the manga of the same name written and illustrated by Yoshiyuki Sadamoto. In addition to the original animated series, Evangelions appear in its derivative works, including spin-off manga, video games, visual novels, the original video animation Petit Eva: Evangelion@School, and in the Rebuild of Evangelion movies, with considerably different roles and guises.

In the original animated series, the Evangelions are giant humanoids, which the research center Gehirn and the special agency Nerv research to fight beings called Angels. They have mechanical components and a basic organic structure derived from Adam and Lilith; for this reason, they have eyes, epidermis, internal organs, and nails similar to those of humans and have been classified as cyborgs rather than mecha in the traditional sense. Those assigned to pilot an Evangelion are called Children and are selected by an organization called the Marduk Institute. Their designs, inspired by the oni of Japanese folklore, Ultraman, Iczer-One, Devilman, and other sources, caused problems during the production of the animated series but have received a positive reception from critics and audiences and have been used for merchandise.

== Conception ==
Staff took inspiration from Fight! Iczer One and the image of a blue-haired girl in a liquid-filled capsule.

Hideaki Anno, director and principal screenwriter of Neon Genesis Evangelion, initially sought to create what he called "a simple work featuring robots". He began by focusing on vague images and ideas rather than defined concepts, thinking other staff members would contribute by adding details. According to King Records' Toshimichi Ōtsuki, producer of the series, at the beginning of production, the idea was to create a series about an Ultraman in armor, the franchise of the same name's protagonist. The staff took inspiration from an old project by Gainax, a darker version of Anno's previous work Gunbuster; for the project, Anno came up with the idea of a female pilot in the wake of the original video animation Fight! Iczer One, starting from the image of a girl in a capsule-shaped cockpit full of liquid – prototypes of the Eva-00 pilot Rei Ayanami and the Entry Plug – but without having a precise plot in mind. Other images became the basis of Evangelion, such as skyscrapers emerging from the top of mountains, robots carrying batteries, people dragging large cables, and a city among the Yatsugatake Mountains named Tokyo-2 in Nagano Prefecture.

During production, the staff decided to have teenagers pilot the mechas and follow the tradition of other robot anime. However, Anno did not initially think to give a reason regarding their ages. An explanation came to mind to the character designer of the series, Yoshiyuki Sadamoto. While watching a documentary on the Japanese TV station NHK named The Fantastic Microcosm of the Human Body: Brain and Soul (驚異の小宇宙 人体II 脳と心, Kyōi no shōuchū jintai: nō to kokoro) the artist learned of the existence of A10 nerves. Sadamoto then pitched new ideas for the anime, such as explaining the age of the pilots, who are all teenagers without mothers. Sadamoto tried to create something similar to Space Pirate Captain Harlock's Arcadia, a spaceship with a computer that contains the soul of its creator, Tochirō Ōyama. Anno compared the interface system of the Eva to a modern version of Gō Nagai's Mazinger, a giant robot whose cockpit is located in the head of the robot. The staff thus conceived the Evas as custodians of the soul of the pilot's mother, controlled through a psychic link with her son. Sadamoto also compared the Nerv with the Solo Ship from Space Runaway Ideon, whose crew faces hostile aliens of the Buff Clan and other humans, with mecha that go out of control and communicate only with children. Writer Alexandre Marine noted how Evangelions role as mere copies of Adam can be traced to Ultraman, in which Zarab aliens or Imitation Ultra are represented as evil copies of the titular character; moreover, Yūichi Sasamoto's Ariel also presented a scientist who creates robots which can be controlled just by her descendants. As early as 1994, when Gainax drew up its planning document for Evangelion, the staff had already established the maternal relationship between the Evangelions and their pilots. The planning document also introduced the Marduk Institute, an organization that operates on the "hypothesis of new mental cranial nerve vibrations".

In a preliminary draft during the early planning stages of the animated series, staff suggested the existence of two ancient prehistoric civilizations that appeared on Earth before humans, both of whom were equipped with advanced technologies. The Evangelions in the original scenario would have been created by the first civilization, known as the First Ancestral Race, and would have rebelled against their creators, causing their extinction. The Second Ancestral Race would have created a weapon known as the Longinus Spear in an attempt to defeat the humanoids, scattering warriors named Angels in a state of hibernation around the globe as a countermeasure in case anyone tried to reactivate the Evangelions. The Eva units were conceived from the beginning as living beings and dangerous androids rather than simple weapons; the scenario was designed to contain elements similar to those in video games or role-playing games, such as the units' weapons being hidden in the buildings of Tokyo-3. In the last episodes, there should have been a lunar battle against twelve Angels. The official encyclopedia Evangelion Chronicle linked the initial scenario to the clash between Eva-02 and the Eva series, introduced in the 1997 theatrical conclusion. The American continent and the Eva-06 would also vanish, while the ancient remains of a ruin named Arqa would be revealed. A similar scenario with ancient superior civilizations can be found in Hayao Miyazaki's manga Nausicaä of the Valley of the Wind and Anno's previous work Nadia: The Secret of Blue Water.

An early sketch of an Evangelion unit, whose coloring was compared by character designer Yoshiyuki Sadamoto to an RX-78 Gundam or an Ingram from Patlabor

Eva-00 was initially envisioned to be the first Eva unit to appear in the anime during a battle with an Angel in the first episode. In the second half of the story, there would be preparations to invade an enemy stronghold along the lines of a role-playing game. One of the preliminary drafts of the twenty-fourth episode, written by screenwriter Akio Satsukawa, also introduced a prototype mini Evangelion, a five-meter mecha named αーTypeーEva000, also known as α Eva. When the α Eva goes berserk, it would have attacked the Angel Kaworu Nagisa with animal fury, who would have dodged his blows in a scene inspired by the legend of the samurai Benkei on the Gojo Bridge; at the end of the fight, the Evangelion would have swallowed the Angel Tabris and Rei Ayanami, to be then violently disemboweled by the Prog-Knife of Shinji Ikari's Eva-01. In another proposal, there were two units called 05 and 06, manufactured in Germany, while the Evangelion after 01 would be equipped with a power system known as a positron engine.

Two years before airing, Gainax published a project presentation document to find backers entitled New Century Evangelion (tentative name) Proposal (新世紀エヴァンゲリオン (仮) 企画書, Shinseiki Evangelion (kari) kikakusho; Proposal), which included the initial unit designs. In the Proposal, the Evangelions were described as humanoids made of artificial metal muscles and replicas of Adam, which was described in the document as an artificial giant left by the First Ancestral Race, which would have left the enemies of the series, the Apostolos, for the globe. The document also describes robotic anime on one page as a "compensation for the complexes and various suppressions that children hold, a means of resistance, compensatory behavior". Animator Mitsuo Iso made further suggestions during production; his proposals included the inclusion of a human-sized Eva-05, conceived as a miniaturized version of Eva-01 with a roar similar to a dinosaur from Jurassic Park (1993). Eva-05's size would have foreshadowed the revelation of the Evangelions' human origins. Eva-05 would have eaten a cat Angel, which later became the character of Kaworu Nagisa, while emitting canine sounds. Gendo would have maneuvered Eva-06 in the finale. A Super Eva, similar to Patlabor's Type Zero, was also planned, capable of remaining active for three hundred years.

For the main character of the series, Shinji, Anno himself was used as a model, linking the act of piloting the mecha with his work; according to Kazuya Tsurumaki, assistant director of Neon Genesis Evangelion, while "Shinji was summoned by his father to ride a robot, Anno was summoned by Gainax to direct an animation". Moreover, during the development of the series, the director included scenes in which the mecha are mutilated and lose their limbs. Academic scholar River Seager described the result as "eerie and gothic, often blurring the line between the genres of mecha and horror". The mutilations of the Evas became a product of his personal experience. Anno's father, Takuyo, injured his left leg in an accident with a power saw and was forced to wear a prosthesis for life; following the accident, Hideaki developed a certain attraction to deformity, believing that he could not love "anything perfect". He also compared this to Tetsujin 28-go, where a robot loses an arm. In the twentieth episode of the series, "Weaving a Story 2: oral stage", he also introduced the concept of cannibalism. He added a scene in which Eva-01 devours an Angel in an attempt to disgust and scare a young viewer; he stated, "What would be ideal is that kids who watch it start to vomit". Cannibalism, according to Yūichirō Oguro, curator of extra content of Evangelion's home video editions, would negatively depict the act of eating meat and could also be influenced by Anno's personal experience, who has been vegetarian since childhood and had already transposed this detail of his life in his fictional works.

=== Design and inspirations ===
The design of the Evangelion was conceived and edited by Anno and Ikuto Yamashita, the official mecha designer of the series who previously worked with Anno on Mobile Suit Gundam 0080: War in the Pocket. The director took inspiration from the demons of Japanese folklore, the oni, and wanted to give them a modern look that differed from other mecha, such as the Gundams of the Mobile Suit Gundam series, giving them a more human-demonic nature than strictly robotic. He commissioned Yamashita to create "a demon", "a giant barely under the control of humankind". Yamashita thus drew inspiration for the design of the machines from Gulliver's Travels, with the idea of representing an enormous power restrained, a giant that resembled a relief in a wall. Since the delivery of the preparatory sketches, Yamashita's drawings caused such a stir that even Neon Genesis Evangelion's staff members were divided, causing problems for Gainax. Toshimichi Ōtsuki introduced Neon Genesis Evangelion to a well-known toy company, but a representative of the company told him that a robot with such a design could never sell, especially because the lower limbs were considered too skinny. Anno, after the episode, decided to create a different series compared to the other mecha anime, all financed by private toy companies; moreover, to avoid any possible interference from the financial backers, he designed mecha that were difficult to reproduce in toy form to have more artistic freedom and revolutionize the genre, which he said had been stagnant for a long time and caged in a ready-made model.

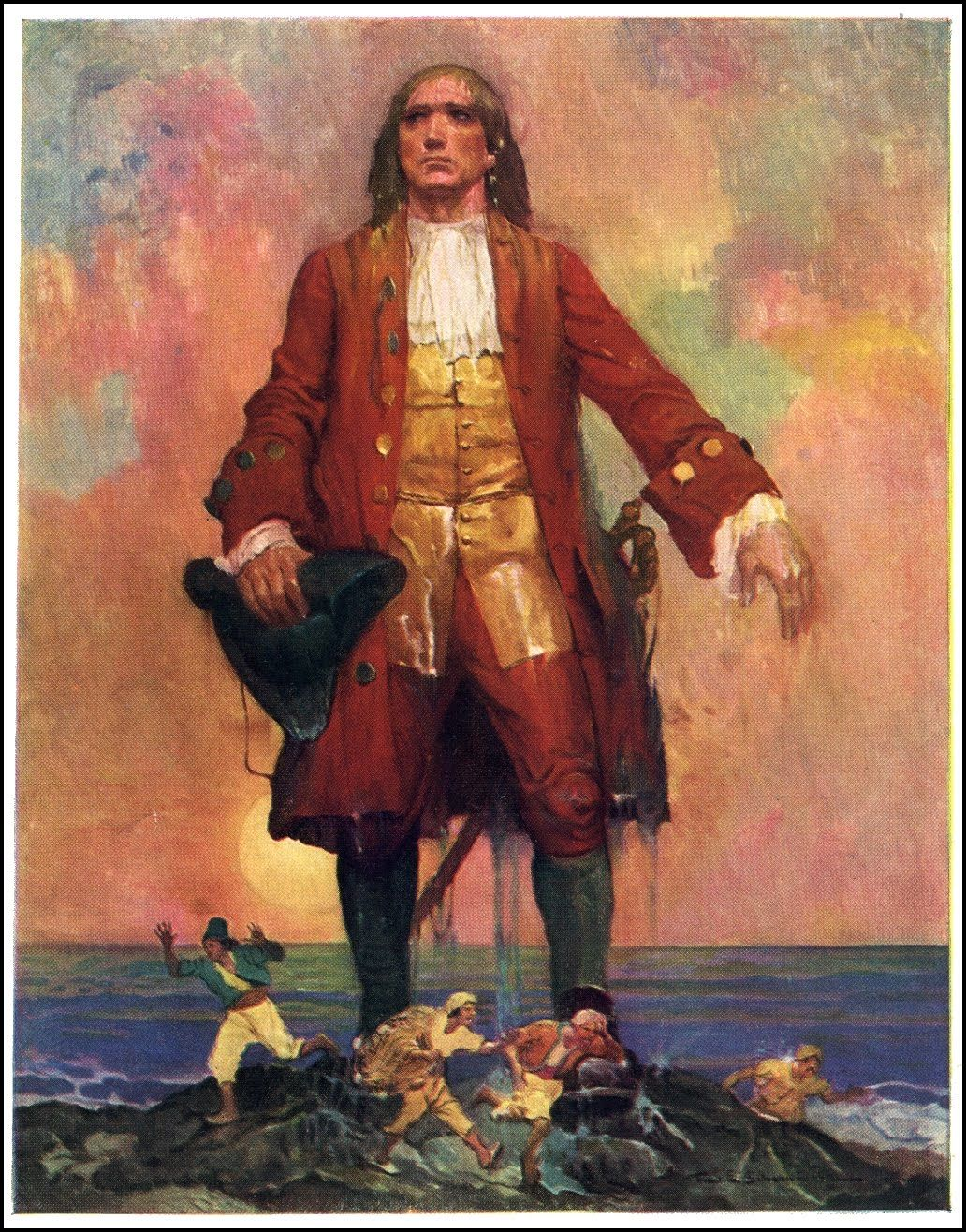
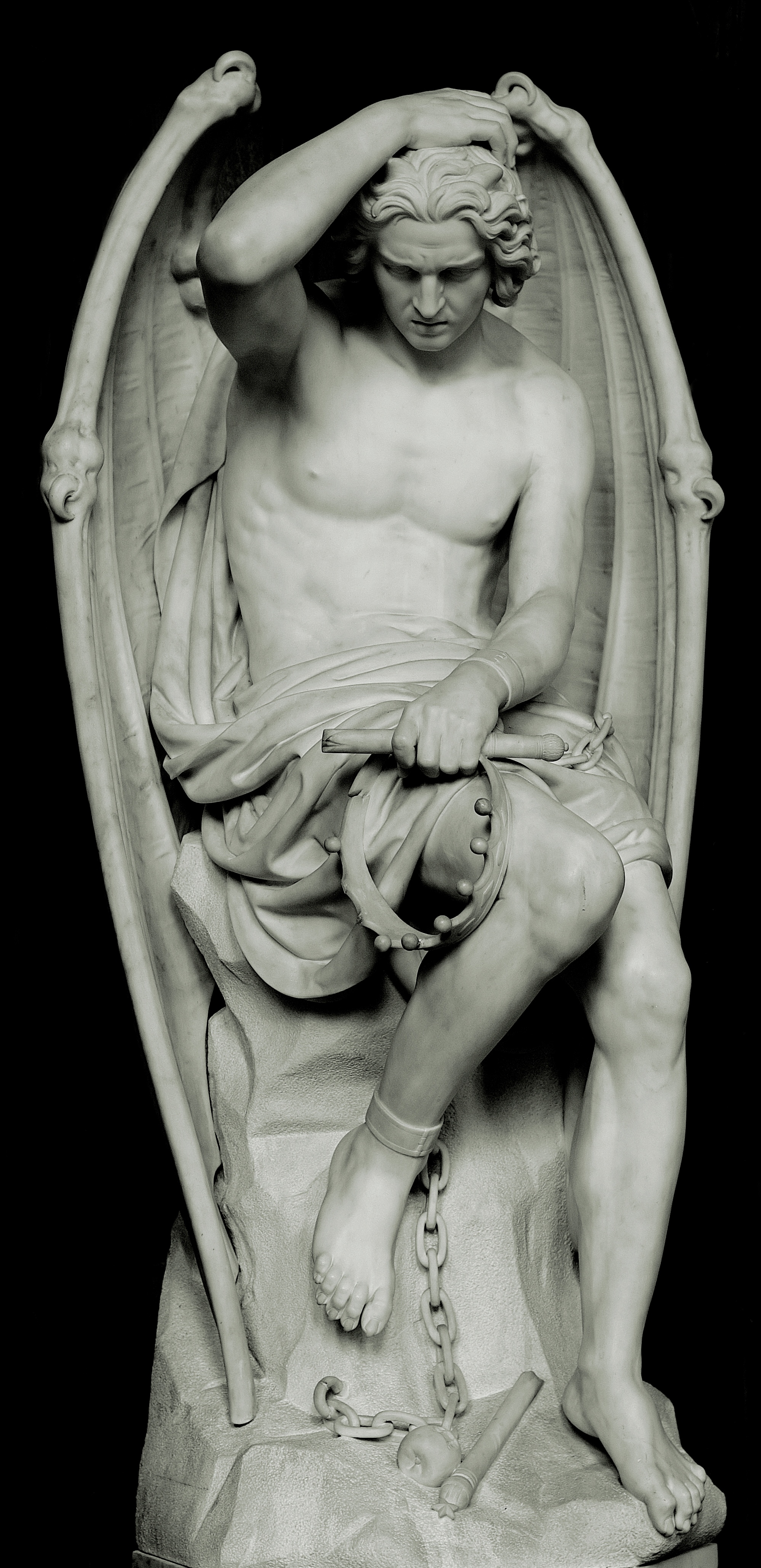
Ikuto Yamashita took inspiration from Jonathan Swift's Gulliver's Travels and was instructed to create the image of a demon.

For the appearance and role of the humanoids, the authors took inspiration from Mazinger Z, Shutendōji, and Devilman. Believing that the power was "something very scary", Anno insisted on the threatening aspect of the units, trying to make the Evangelion look like "an anti-hero, something terrifying". Before deciding on the final design he drew a preliminary draft of the Eva similar to a Devilman. In the sketch the Eva had a curved back, a narrow waist, and a flat, thick chest, which resembled the "demonic" face of the Mazinger. In his original proposal, the Evangelion would have had a dark and gloomy color, except for the eyes, which he left white and circled in red, just like Mazinger Z. The intention was to inspire terror and make children understand how scary real life could be. Writer Alexandre Marine also compared the Evas with the Giant Warrior from Nausicaä of the Valley of the Wind (1984). She also noted Evas initial design resembled Detonator Orgun mechas, with elements from the original scenario resembling Castle in the Sky (1986).

Another source of inspiration was a male character in the video game Cho Aniki named El&Topo, on which Yamashita based Eva-02's appearance. In the design stages, he changed his mind about their appearance several times; for example, in preliminary sketches, he thought about giving 01 a single oblique protrusion on the left side of the head or two frontal horns, which were later abandoned in favor of the final design. Anno and animator Yō Yoshinari also made some sketches of the Eva-01. Yoshinari tried to animate the units using rulers, as in the case of the second episode, "The Beast", in which he tried to draw almost the entire face and shoulders of 01 in such a way. Sadamoto at first colored it white, creating an image he said was similar to an RX-78 Gundam or an Ingram from Patlabor. While working on the Evas' design, he also worked on a project called Suzuka Hachitai, in which he designed suits similar to the Evangelions' plugsuits.

According to scholar Giuseppe Gatti, Evas' design recalls "the technological imagery of the second European industrial revolution", already present in the cinematography of Hayao Miyazaki and Anno's Nadia. For the movements, the director asked to recreate "the noise that the bundles of wires would make if they were contracting like muscles", treating them as if they were living beings. For this reason, all the sounds normally used in other mecha anime were avoided; for example, to reproduce the sound of the Prog-Knife, Anno and Toru Noguchi, the sound effects editor, reworked the metallic noise of a real cutter. To give the Eva's cockpit the image of a mother's womb, Anno asked Shirō Sagisu, who was responsible for the series' soundtrack, to compose a melody that would accentuate the feeling of nostalgia.

== Characteristics ==
In the world of Neon Genesis Evangelion, Evangelions, or Evas, are multi-purpose machines that represent mankind's most advanced battle tools. They are costly weapons designed to fight and destroy Angels. Their development, which the special agency Nerv conducts in secret, began after a catastrophe known as the Second Impact. From a scientific point of view, these tasks constitute the E project, placed under the direction and responsibility of Dr. Ritsuko Akagi. The Evangelions are giant humanoids clad in thick protective armor, with a constitution identical to a human being's, except for size. Each Evangelion is equipped with a nervous system, a skeleton, nails and a circulatory system. In a section of Nerv's headquarters called Terminal Dogma, there are skeletons of bodies believed to be precursors to the Eva-00, or the remains of failed experiments that occurred during its creation; the experimental models have two or more optical sensors and a visible spine. The original living bodies are implanted with mechanical components and a constrictive coverage, which are used to control them or provide them with greater efficiency and functionality. As in humans, the signals of the central nervous system are transmitted by electrical impulses, with the peripheral system and the movements of an Evangelion being transmitted by electric currents. For the first three examples, designed in Japan, the traditional Chinese numbering system is adopted, while later prototypes follow Arabic numbering.

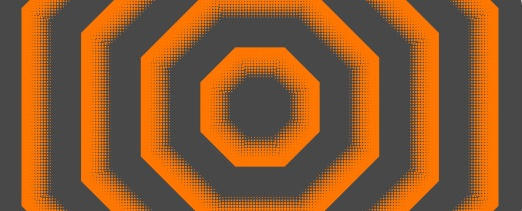
The Evas and Angels can generate a force field known as an AT Field, usually presented in the form of concentric octagons.

The Evas have regenerative capabilities and can produce a protective shield called an AT Field. They can move through the power provided by an external cable called an Umbilical Cable, which gives them the electrical energy needed to operate their circuits. In the absence of the cable, they can operate using the energy stored in a special internal battery, for a time limit ranging from sixty seconds to five minutes. When inactive, the units are housed in giant structures called "cages" and held in place by an anchoring structure, composed of various blocks and groups of safeties. Another characteristic element of the Angels and Evangelions is a red sphere called a core, located at their chest.

The units have different equipment that varies depending on the situation. The basic one is called type B (Basic), consisting only of a cutter-like weapon called a Progressive Knife. Other assets include type D (Dive), specifically for diving; and type F (Fly) for flight. The Evangelion's piloting system synchronizes with its pilot via neural connection, and so they act in sync. The pilot of an Evangelion unit, designated by the English term Child, is housed in a cylindrical capsule called an Entry Plug, which is inserted into the area corresponding to the humanoid's spine, at the cervical vertebrae.

The cockpit of the Entry Plug is filled with a special liquid called LCL, which promotes the neural connection between the Evangelion and its pilot. The main nerve responsible for synchronizing the two entities is called the A10 nerve. It seems that the subjects suitable to pilot an Evangelion are limited to 14-year-old children without a mother, and that Evangelions, originally devoid of a soul, have the souls of people. It is also believed that the souls of the mothers of their respective pilots are housed in the mechas. Once the neural connection is successfully established, the Children can command the humanoid at will, thinking that they are acting with their own body, through a system known as neural interface. However, its maintenance can be jeopardized if it is damaged during an operation, which causes corresponding psychological disorders in the pilot. Moreover, a state commonly referred to as berserk is possible, during which an Evangelion enters an uncontrollable and seemingly instinctual destructive rage. According to the Evangelion Chronicle magazine, the aggressiveness of Eva-01' berserk can be due to the fact that Unit-01 is a clone of the Angel Lilith, while the Angels are descended from Adam. Their height is never specified in the series, though Newtype magazine provided an estimate of forty meters. According to Hiroyuki Yamaga, a member of Gainax, it was decided during production to make the units taller than Ultraman, who is forty-five meters tall. In the Proposal, their height is also determined forty meters, while in the Rebuild of Evangelion saga their height is explicitly around seventy meters, eighty with their vertical supports.

== Original series ==
=== Evangelion Unit-00 ===
Unit 00 (零号機, Zerogōki), also known as Prototype, is the first Evangelion unit that Nerv made. It was conceived as a machine dedicated not to combat, but to the study of feasibility and practical functionality of its basic technology, which is why it lacks equipment characteristic of subsequent units. It was conceived in the headquarters of Tokyo-3, and the biological starting material used for its creation belongs to the first Angel, Adam. It is distinguished from later models by its initial dark yellow coloration, typical of military prototypes, and a less sophisticated external and internal architecture. Its main organ of visual sensory perception is represented by a round optical lens at the center of its face. Its pilot is Rei Ayanami, who joins the organization as the First Child. Due to its function as a prototype, the unit suffers from instability, which causes it to act out of control in activation and synchronization experiments. In one of the experiments, it destroyed the anchor structures and Nerv's second experimental room, injuring its pilot. Its first effective activation occurs after the simultaneous presence of two Evangelion units is necessary during the Angel Ramiel's attack. In the course of the operation, it suffers structural damage so severe that it requires extensive repairs.

Eva-00 is later used in the fight against the Angel Matarael after being repaired. The repairs to Eva-00 mainly concern its armor and equipment, while its internal structure is essentially unchanged. The repaired Eva-00 has a predominantly blue coloration and is equipped with vertical supports resembling those fitted to Eva-01 and 02. It also has shoulder-height vertical supports, which are equipped with a special propulsion system allowing it to slow down and cushion falls. Its presence is beneficial to the defense of Tokyo-3 and the elimination of Angels. It is destroyed during the fight against the sixteenth Angel, Armisael, after Rei activates the self-destruct mechanism.

In the series' twenty-third episode, Ritsuko reveals a graveyard containing several failed Eva-00 prototypes; according to writer Virginie Nebbia, Gainax had already introduced a similar idea in its previous series, Nadia. In the Rebuild of Evangelion saga, Eva-00 is orange in color and wields a special shield called the Enhanced Shield of Virtue, which Yamashita designed. In the second chapter of the saga, Evangelion: 2.0 You Can (Not) Advance (2009), the tenth Angel swallows it.

=== Evangelion Unit-01 ===
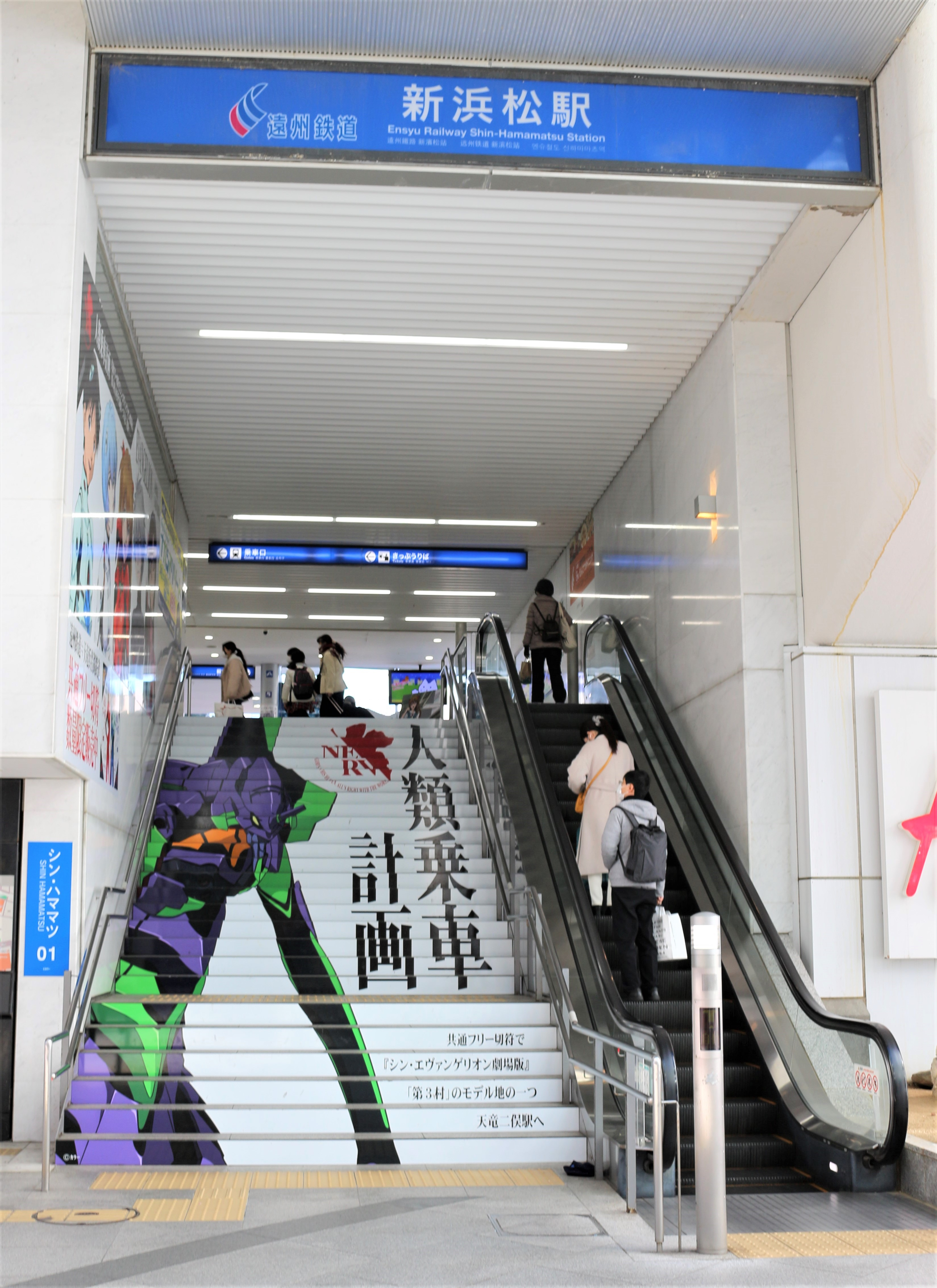
Entrance to Shin-Hamamatsu Station decorated with the image of Eva-01

Unit 01 (初号機, Shogōki), or Test Type, is the experimental model of the Evangelion series and the second specimen to be built in the Nerv headquarters, studied under the direct supervision of Dr. Yui Ikari. It differs from all previous and subsequent specimens, as the biological matter that forms its basis comes from the second Angel, Lilith. In addition to its predominantly purple coloration, it is characterized by a long horn that extends from the center of the forehead and a binocular viewer. It is the first humanoid to be used in an actual war operation. The unit acts out of control on several occasions and takes on a decisive role in wartime operations. The living humanoid at the base of Unit-01 is characterized by brown-colored organic tissues and a red blood-like body fluid. The unit's mouth is normally secured with bolts, and its actual biological body is covered, like the other units, by a special constrictive armor. The unit has positive operational results and the greatest tactical experience out of all the units that Nerv produced.

The first activation experiment of Unit-01 was carried out in 2004 in the Laboratory for Artificial Evolution and conducted by a research center called Gehirn. Yui was designated as the experiment's test subject; during the experiment, her synchrony rate reached 400%, a percentage at which the subject dissolves into the Evangelion. The case was dismissed as an accident, and her soul remained within the unit. Although the origin of the accident is never clarified within the series, it may have been the consequence of Yui's choice. The second activation attempt occurs eleven years later in 2015, when the Third Child, Shinji Ikari, is brought aboard. Shinji, despite the low probability of success and lack of training, manages to achieve a 41.3% sync rate on the first attempt. The success of the procedure might have been determined by Yui's will, who in some situations intervenes in defense of her son and moves the Eva of her own will. In the series' nineteenth episode, Eva-01 devours the Angel Zeruel, thereby assimilating its S² Engine, an organ that allows the Angels to generate an unlimited supply of energy.

In the Rebuild of Evangelion installments, Eva-01 has some aesthetic differences, particularly in the chest and coloring. During the battle against the tenth Angel, the color of its stripes changes from green to orange and it sports a halo of light.

=== Evangelion Unit-02 ===
Unit 02 (弐号機, Nigōki), or Production Model, is the first Evangelion specimen researched and designed for mass production and combat. Although the conception and construction of the machine took place in Japan, the assembly and activation experiments, as well as the training of its pilot, the Second Child Asuka Langley Soryu, are performed in Germany. The biological material used for its creation belongs to Adam. Dr. Kyōko Zeppelin Sōryū, a member of Gehirn's German section, played a decisive role in the unit's development and activation. She offered herself as a guinea pig in a contact experiment with the Evangelion, from which she emerged psychologically distraught after a mental contamination. It is speculated that a part of her soul, or her "maternal side", remained locked inside 02. In contrast to the first two units, it has four eyes, a feature that is abandoned in later models. Additional features that distinguish 02 from other units are its internal fluids being blue instead of red and having additional mechanical details.

On the shoulders, it has two vertical supports that differ from the Eva-01. The left contains an improved version of the Progressive Knife, while the right contains the Needle Gun, a firearm capable of firing spikes. The unit is predominantly red and differs from previous units in the conformation of the head, shoulder, and chest components. Two of its main features are the ability to bend its torso and a greater resemblance to a human being, while there are no substantial differences in its performance compared to Eva-01. In 2015, Asuka and 02 left Wilhelmshaven for Tokyo-3, along with the United Nations fleet. During the transport, Eva-02's first real battle took place in the Pacific Ocean, in which it managed to defeat the Angel Gaghiel. Starting from the fight against the thirteenth Angel, Bardiel, the unit starts to record failures in the operations, hurting Asuka's pride. Following Asuka's mental breakdown, Nerv is forced to request the help of a new Child, Kaworu Nagisa, who becomes its new pilot.

In the Rebuild of Evangelion movies, Eva-02 has a different design. During the production, the staff decided to change the unit's head, giving it two small horn-like protrusions located on top of the forehead, designed by Takeshi Honda. Throughout the film, Eva-02 is piloted by Mari Makinami, who activates a new mode called The Beast. After activating The Beast Mode, the Eva becomes quadrupedal and unleashes sticks on its shoulders and back and has a jaw with sharp fangs and a green light emitting from its eyes.

=== Evangelion Unit-03 ===
Unit 03 (参号機, Sangōki) is a mass-production model built at Nerv's US first division. Due to an accident that occurred at the second division with Eva-04, command over 03 passed to Japan as instructed by the US government. Following the government's decision, the unit is airlifted over the Pacific Ocean to the organization's headquarters. The 03 is almost identical in appearance to the Eva-02, except it is predominantly dark blue, and the shape of its head is closer to Unit 01's. Eva-03's face has more brutal features and lacks the characteristic frontal bulge of the Eva-01. Additional details that distinguish it from the other units are its elongated shoulders, slightly forward-leaning posture, and gait. Once it arrives in Japan, preparations begin for its activation experiment to take place in the city of Matsushiro, Nagano Prefecture, where Nerv's second experimentation site is located. Once its designated pilot, the Fourth Child Toji Suzuhara, boards, the unit goes out of control, opens its jaws, and destroys the fences containing it. It is later revealed that the unit is infected by Bardiel, a parasitic Angel that takes control of its body during its flight to Japan headquarters. After the incident, Gendo Ikari, the supreme commander of Nerv, identifies it as the thirteenth Angel and gives the order to annihilate it. Eva-03 faces Units 00 and 02 in combat, defeating them without difficulty. During the fight in the open field, Eva-03 is able to extend its limbs like a reptile and disarticulate its carapace like an insect. In a second encounter, it fights with Eva-01, who breaks its limbs and annihilates it. In the Rebuild of Evangelion saga, Eva-03 is piloted by Asuka instead of Suzuhara.

=== Evangelion Unit-04 ===
Unit 04 (四号機, Yongōki) is a Mass-Production Model built in the United States at the American Nerv Second Division, located in Nevada. Due to an accident that occurred during a test of experimental insertion of the S^{2} engine, the unit disappears with the second division and all objects within a radius of 89 kilometers in a Dirac sea. Its appearance is never shown in the original animated series, but is believed to be silver-white. Official action figures have been produced of the unit, designed and conceived by Yamashita. Its basic appearance is identical to Unit 03 but it has a silver color.

=== Mass Production Units (05-13) ===
The Eva Series (エヴァシリーズ, Evashirīzu) includes units 05 through 13, built at various Nerv branches at the behest of the Seele organization to carry out a plan known as the Human Instrumentality Project. All units are equipped with S^{2} engines as their power source and a replica of the Lance of Longinus. Their basic structure is identical to the Nerv-owned Evas, except for the vertical supports normally placed on the shoulders of the other units. Another different element is the head, which is devoid of optical sensors, and the area in which the cockpit is inserted. Due to the S^{2} element, the units also have strong regenerative capabilities and unlimited uptime. All nine Eva Series possess the same shape and coloring, mostly white, and large folding wings located on the back of the trunk, which allow them to fly. These Production Models do not require pilots; instead they have a Dummy Plug, Entry Plug simulators in which the personality of the Fifth Children, Kaworu Nagisa, is inscribed.

In the movie The End of Evangelion, Seele sends all nine Evangelions against Eva-02. The Evas, despite suffering extensive damage from Unit-02 during the fight and being seemingly defeated, managed to reactivate through the S^{2} engine, scarring the enemy's body and devouring its flesh. During the Human Instrumentality Project, the Mass Production Models merge with the Angel Lilith and stab themselves with their lances. At the end of the feature film, once Instrumentality is rejected by Shinji and Lilith is dismembered, the units turn into stone statues and plummet to Earth. Their design by Takeshi Honda is reminiscent of features commonly associated with angels from the Old Testament.

== Rebuild of Evangelion ==
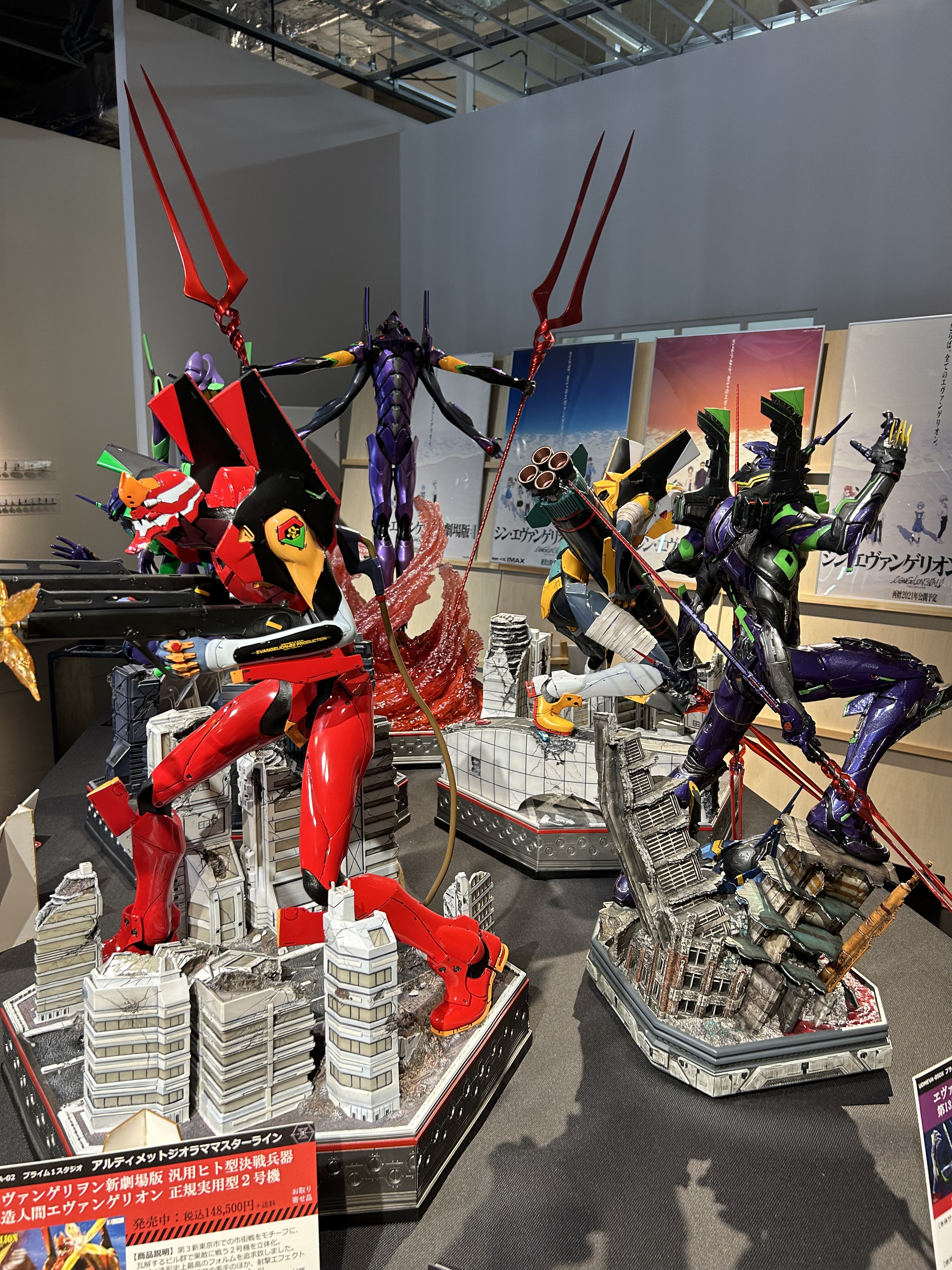
Rebuild of Evangelion Evas at the Small Worlds Miniature Museum

During the production of the Rebuild of Evangelion installments, Yamashita made changes to the armaments and the colors of Eva-00 and the other Evangelions, based on his old sketches for the original series. In the saga, an international agreement called the Vatican Treaty is also mentioned, which forbids a nation from having more than three Eva units. Throughout the films, in addition to the various units already present in the classic series, other Evangelion units are introduced:

- Evangelion 05 (エヴァンゲリオン5号機, Evangerion Gogōki), whose full name is Specialized Seal-Guarding Limited Use Weapon: Artificial Human Evangelion: Local Specifications Model 05 (封印監視特化型限定兵器 人造人間エヴァンゲリオン 局地仕様 仮設5号機, Fūin kanshi tokkagata gentei heiki homunkurusu Evangerion kyokuchi shiyō kasetsu Gogōki), is a unit that appears in Evangelion 2.0 You Can (Not) Advance. It was designed by Yamashita and underwent changes during the production of the film. Unlike the other Evangelions, its walking is not done through two lower limbs, but utilizing a special wheeled system, and it has a spear-shaped arm. The components of the unit were made in computer graphics, except for the close-ups of the head, to avoid errors in movements. In combat it faces the third Angel of the Rebuild, giving signs of a berserk state; both the Eva and the Angel, at the end of the battle, come out destroyed, annihilating each other.
- The Mark.06 (マークシックス, Mākushikkusu), known as Evangelion 06 (エヴァンゲリオン6号機, Evangerion Rokugōki), is an Evangelion unit featured in the film Evangelion: 2.0 You Can (Not) Advance. It is built on the Moon base Tabgha, placed under the control of the Seele. During the film, it descends from the Moon and is piloted by Kaworu, sporting a halo of light similar to that of 01.
- The Mark.07 is an Evangelion unit that appears in Evangelion: 3.0+1.0 Thrice Upon a Time. It has beige-colored armor, dark-colored vertical supports, and a head similar to a humanoid skull. During the film, Asuka's Eva-02 and Mari's Eva-08 clash against an army of hundreds of Mark.07s at the epicenter of Second Impact in Antarctica. During the production, Yamashita sketched the units with a different color scheme.
- Evangelion 08 (エヴァンゲリオン8号機, Evangerion Hachigōki) is an Evangelion unit introduced in the preview of Evangelion: 3.0 You Can (Not) Redo featured at the end of the credits of Evangelion 2.0. Throughout the film, it is piloted by Mari Illustrious Makinami; it has eight optical sensors. It is predominantly pink, with small inserts of yellow and green. Its full official nomenclature is Evangelion Production Model Custom Type (エヴァンゲリオン 正規実用型 8号機, Evangerion Seiki Vire Kasutamu Hachigōki).
- Evangelion 08+02 (エヴァンゲリオン8+2号機, Evangerion Hachi+Nigōki) is an Evangelion unit introduced in the brief preview of Evangelion: 3.0+1.0 present at the end of the Evangelion 3.0 film. Its armor is half red and half pink. This specimen is believed to be the result of a fusion between two previous units, 02 and 08. It does not appear in the film.
- The Mark.09 is an Evangelion unit introduced in Evangelion 3.0. Its armor is predominantly yellow, with small white inserts. Throughout the film, its color scheme changes to black and red. It is piloted by Rei Ayanami and is known by the epithet "Adams' Vessel".
- The Mark.10 (エヴァンゲリオンマークテン, Evangerion mākuten) is a black, red, and white Evangelion unit that appears in 3.0+1.0. In the course of the film it attacks Mari's Unit 08, which devours its head in the clash. The unit was unveiled by Anno at the 2020 Bonbori Matsuri festival on August 6, 2020.
- The Mark.11 is an Evangelion that appears in 3.0+1.0. It is devoured by Mari's 08 during the overlapping of its own Eva. The unit is black, blue and white.
- The Mark.12 appears in 3.0+1.0. The unit is mostly black and white, and is devoured by Mari's Eva-08.
- Evangelion 13 (エヴァンゲリオン第13号機, Evangerion Jūsangōki) is a unit that appears in the Evangelion 3.0 film. Its armor is predominantly purple. It has four eyes and four upper limbs. It is piloted by Shinji Ikari and Kaworu Nagisa and can be activated through two Entry Plugs. Since it cannot generate an AT Field, it is equipped with four drones called RS Hoppers.
- The Evangelion Imaginary (エヴァンゲリオン・イマジナリー, Evuangerion Imajinarī) is an Eva presented in an anti-universe by Gendo to Shinji; Shinji's consciousness sees it in the form of a black crucified Lilith, who during Instrumentality breaks free and transforms into a giant Rei Ayanami. Commander Ikari tries to unleash the Additional Impact in this way to carry out the deicide, replace the Angels and transform everyone into Evangelion, rewriting reality and the consciences of humanity.

The Eva units used by Gendo in Evangelion 3.0+1.0 have been compared by the website Otaku Voice to the Four Horsemen of the Apocalypse. Rebuild also features a mechanical simulator of Evangelion, used by Shinji during a training in the first chapter; its design was compared by Shinji Higuchi of Gainax to the God Warrior of Nausicaä of the Valley of the Wind (1984) and to the movements of the Destroid Monster, a machine from Superdimensional Fortress Macross.

== Other media ==
New units are introduced in video games based on Neon Genesis Evangelion. In Meitantei Evangelion, published in 2007 for PlayStation 2, there is an Evangelion unit called Evangelion Type β (エヴァンゲリオン乙型, Evangerion Otsugata) that is piloted by Kaworu. It also appears in the video game Shin Seiki Evangelion – Battle Orchestra, in which another Evangelion called Evangelion Unit-α (エヴァンゲリオン甲号機, Evangerion Kougouki) is introduced, built at Seele's request. In the Neon Genesis Evangelion 2 video game, the Eva-01 has new equipment, called Type-F equipment (F型装備, F-gata sōbi). It includes the experimental AFC armor (AFCエクスペリメント, AFC ekusuperimento), a special constricting cover that uses new technology for AT Field use; included in the armor is an A.T.F. deflector (A.T.F.偏向器) and a T.A.D. reaction propulsion device (T.A.D.ジェット推進器, T.A.D. jetto suishin-ki). The equipment also includes a special anti-phase weapon called Impact Bolt (インパクトボルト, Inpakuto boruto) and the Progressive Dagger. Despite its great attack and defense power, the Type-F equipment weighs thrice than the standard armor, is difficult to maneuver and suffers from instability.

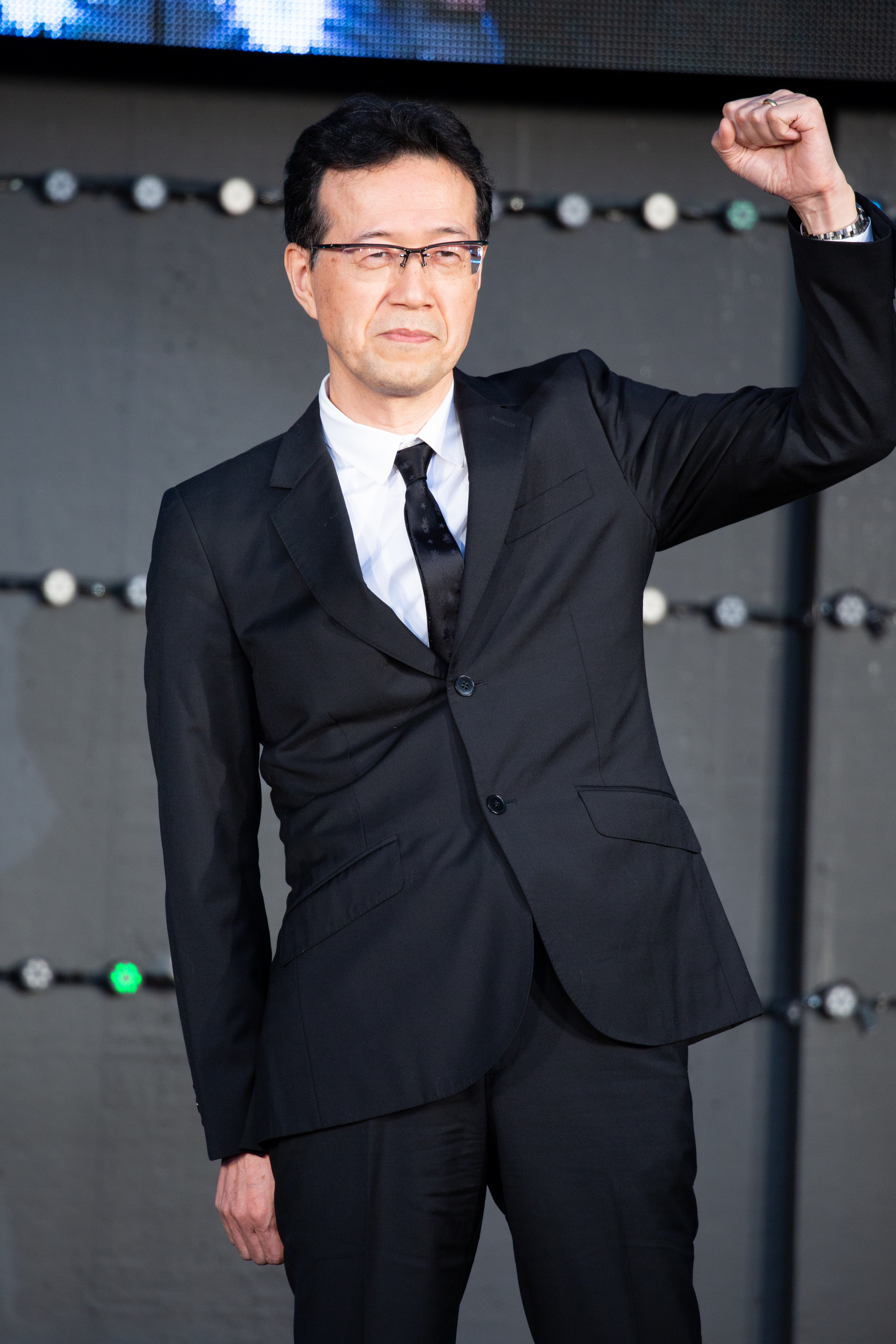
In the Japan Animator Expo's short movie Evangelion: Another Impact, directed by Shinji Aramaki (pictured), a new Evangelion named Unit Null is introduced.

In the spin-off Petit Eva: Evangelion@School super-deformed versions of Evangelions are shown: the eldest, Evancho (エヴァンチョー), similar to Eva-01, is a schoolmate of Shinji and the other characters at the Nerv municipal academy, and its language is understood only by Shinji and the other units; its brother, Eva Jiro (エヴァ次郎), who attends the Angel school; Evan-chan (エヴァンちゃん), its younger sister, can speak in human language, is initially mostly yellow and then takes on a blue tint; and Eva Bi (エヴァ美), the most anthropomorphic, clumsy, and Asuka-like unit who claims to be German but often uses Japanese mixed with English when speaking. Mari and her Provisional Unit 05 also appear on one cover.

Rebuild's Provisional Unit 05 was used in a pachinko game titled CR Evangerion 〜Hajimari No Fukuin〜 (CRヱヴァンゲリヲン 〜始まりの福音〜), released in 2010, while Eva-04 appeared in another pachinko game called CR Shinseiki Evangelion: Saigo no shisha (CR新世紀エヴァンゲリオン ～最後のシ者～). In Neon Genesis Evangelion: Campus Apocalypse, the Eva are not mecha, but individual wieldable weapons used in combat by Shinji and the other characters. They are the manifestations of the deeper inner self of the protagonists; Rei has a spear, Asuka a whip, Kaworu a sword, and Shinji a gun. On February 6, 2015, Studio Khara, producer of the Rebuild of Evangelion film tetralogy, released the twelfth short film in the Japan Animator Expo series, Evangelion: Another Impact (Confidential). It introduces an Evangelion unit called Unit Nul, which breaks free during a secret activation test and goes berserk; the purpose and means of its construction are not clear. Its design was handled by Atsushi Takeuchi, who had previously worked for the Star Wars franchise. A transformable train called 500 Type Eva, piloted by Shinji and inspired by the train of the same name dedicated to Neon Genesis Evangelion, also appears in an episode of the 2018 anime Shinkansen Henkei Robo Shinkalion.

=== Neon Genesis Evangelion: Anima ===
Set three years after the events of the concluding film The End of Evangelion, the light novel introduces equipment that never appeared in the original animated series. Among other things, Eva-01 features Type-F and CGB equipment, including new vertical supports and a special sensor placed near the horn on its forehead. A new Evangelion mount called UX-1 Allegorica (UX-1 アレゴリカ) is also introduced, which operates via a secure internal N^{2} technology reactor. Anima also features a further evolution of the Eva-01 called Super Evangelion (スーパーエヴァンゲリオン).

- The Evangelion-0.0 Units (零号機試製II式改・領域制圧機「O・OEVA」, Zerogōki Shisei II-Shiki Aratame Ryōiki Seiatsuki "0・0 EVA") are yellow and white Evangelions built from the remains of the Eva-00 and Eva Series. The Evangelions are equipped with S^{2} engines and piloted by different clones of Rei Ayanami: Rei Quatre, Rei Cinq and Rei Six.
- The Evangelion-02 Type II Unit (エヴァンゲリオン弐号機II式, Evangerion nigōki II-shiki) is an evolution of the Eva-02 from the classic series and is predominantly red. The unit's visors and armor are different, given the extensive damage the unit suffered after fighting with the nine serial Eva. The Evangelion is equipped with a special cross-shaped rectenna, located on the back of the torso, which uses microwaves and provides the unit with electricity. Type II is equipped with new mounts that can penetrate Armaros' AT Field, which include a new Pallet Rifle and Magorox blade. The new 02 is equipped with the UX-1 Allegorica, which gives the unit the ability to fly and stability, through which it can also operate on the regolith of the lunar soil.
- The Angel Carriers (エンジェルキャリヤー, Enjeru Kyariyā) are new Eva models, similar to the Mass Production Models that appeared in The End of Evangelion to take down Asuka. Unlike the mass units, they do not have a Super-Solenoid engine, but a new energy engine called QR Signum.
- The Evangelion EUROII Heurtebize (エヴァンゲリオン・EUROII・ウルトビーズ, Evangerion EUROII urutobīzu) is a white-colored Eva, similar to the 02, equipped, like the Carriers, with the QR Signum. Its main weapon is a huge cruciform spear. Its name comes from Heurtebise, the angel present in the works of Jean Cocteau and associated with the image of a bright mirror.
- Armaros (アルマロス, Arumarosu) is a giant Evangelion that appears on the Moon. It is accompanied by a pair of units called Torwart (トゥーバート, To~ūbāto), known to the Japanese Nerv as Victor (ヴィクタ, Vikutā). Its name comes from the fallen angel of the same name in religious tradition who is said to have revealed the secret name of God to humans. Its face, similar to that of the Eva-01, features two horns aligned at forehead height, originally envisioned by Yamashita for the design of the 01.
- Crimson A1 (クリムゾンA1) is a red-colored hybrid of human and Evangelion, and is the result of Asuka merging with her Evangelion-02 Allegorica following the lunar battle against Armaros. It has the mind of an unconscious small child who is unable to communicate.

== Cultural references and interpretations ==
The A10 is the main nerve at the neural interface of the Evas. The term refers to the ventral tegmental area, or A10 region, that is supposed to be involved in the procession of feelings of love between a mother and child.

The staff named the mecha after the Greek word ευ-αγγέλιον (euangelion), "gospel", "good news", shortened to Eva, to allude to Eve. According to Animerica, the name would be related to their task as protectors of humanity. Similar to the biblical Eve, born from the rib of the first man Adam, the Evangelions were conceived as copies of the first Angel Adam. According to scholars Víctor Sellés de Lucas and Manuel Hernández-Pérez, the name, shared with the biblical mother of humanity, alludes to the Evangelions' true nature, as they contain the souls of their respective pilots' mothers. Director Anno said in an interview that he chose it because it sounded "complicated". On another occasion, he claimed to have chosen the word "good news" as the title of the series because of the belief that it would bring "blessing" and happiness. Yūichirō Oguro, curator of extra content of the home video editions of the series, linked the name to the last scene of Neon Genesis Evangelion: The End of Evangelion, in which there is a sequence in which Yui Ikari, kept inside the Eva-01, blesses her son Shinji by telling him that "any place can be a paradise".

The units are also linked with other religious references. In a conversation in the twenty-third episode, Seele claims that eight Eva units have been prepared up to that point and that four more remain; according to the series' film books, the number is a reference to the twelve apostles. In the theme song, "A Cruel Angel's Thesis", Unit 01 is depicted with twelve wings of light, referring to the iconography of Satan and taking a cue from the manga Devilman. For the image of the out-of-control Unit 01, which in the nineteenth episode walks on four legs and devours the flesh of an Angel, the staff took inspiration from the Buddhist figures of the preta. The scene in which Eva-01 is first introduced in the first episode has also been compared to Tadao Nagahama's Combattler V, while for Carl Gustav Horn, editor of the North American edition of the manga, the Eva units can be "possibly connected to the legend of the Golem, a giant artificial man which does its creator's bidding". A similar interpretation was offered by Animage magazine and Evangelion Chronicle, an official encyclopedia of the series, which compared the Evangelions and the Angels to golems and Mary Shelley's Frankenstein's monster, as both display violence and uncontrollable powers.

Scholar Nikolai Afanasov linked the Evangelions' autonomy to the Shinto belief that even objects can be inhabited by spirits, or kami; in the case of the Evangelion units, this autonomy derives from the presence of the pilots' mothers' souls. Eva's berserk mode has been compared to the berserker warriors, as they entered a state of fury that made them fierce and insensitive to pain. After the fight against Zeruel, Unit 01 acquires mankind's fruit of knowledge, science and rationality, and the Angel's fruit of life, the S^{2} engine, becoming a God. An official pamphlet on the series has compared this to the Book of Genesis, which says that whoever eats the two fruits will become like God. In The End of Evangelion Eva-01 is also inflicted with stigmata, becomes the tree of life and is defined as an ark that can save mankind, in reference to the story of Noah. Moreover, the Umbilical Bridge, the anchoring structure of an Evangelion unit, took inspiration from a technical term used by NASA to define the service structure, or umbilical tower, that connects the Space Shuttle to the launch pad. Eva's Umbilical Cable has also been similarly likened to a cable intended to connect the main body of the Space Shuttle to the auxiliary engines, the umbilical cord of the fetus and Emperor Neo from Nadia: The Secret of Blue Water, which is powered by a cable that terminates in a similar socket.

In the fifth episode, "Rei I", in the first Eva-00 experiment scene, the English writing "Border Line" can be read on the Nerv monitors, indicating an absolute limit beyond which the Eva unit and its pilot are synchronized; according to writer Alexandre Marine, the Border Line can be linked to the borderline personality disorder, which leads sufferers to be prone to suicide or fits of rage. The book Evangelion Glossary (エヴァンゲリオン用語事典, Evangerion Yougo Jiten) by Yahata Shoten noted how in Craig Thomas' Firefox the idea of a fighter pilot's thought-guided weapon capable of controlling missile launches using brain waves is presented. The same book compared the Eva interface to similar technologies presented in science fiction, such as in William Gibson's Neuromancer; the LCL, on the other hand, resembles real liquid respiration and a technology featured in James Cameron's The Abyss (1989), while the Entry Plug is reminiscent of Dr. John C. Lilly's flotation tank that inspired Ken Russell's Altered States. Japanese architect and academic Tomoko Sakamoto also noted how images similar to those in 2001: A Space Odyssey (1968) appear in the Entry Plug during the activation of the connection between the Eva and its pilot. Virginie Nebbia linked the image of organic, monstrous robots to Bio City, a manga by Daijirō Morohoshi. Writer Claudio Cordella, for his part, compared LCL to Gō Nagai's works, which had already explored the fusion of robots with a liquid element; he also compared the Evangelions to the powered exoskeletons in Starship Troopers. Protoculture Addicts magazine similarly compared the Units' biological structure to the Mortar Headds of The Five Star Stories and the Aura Battlers of Aura Battler Dunbine.

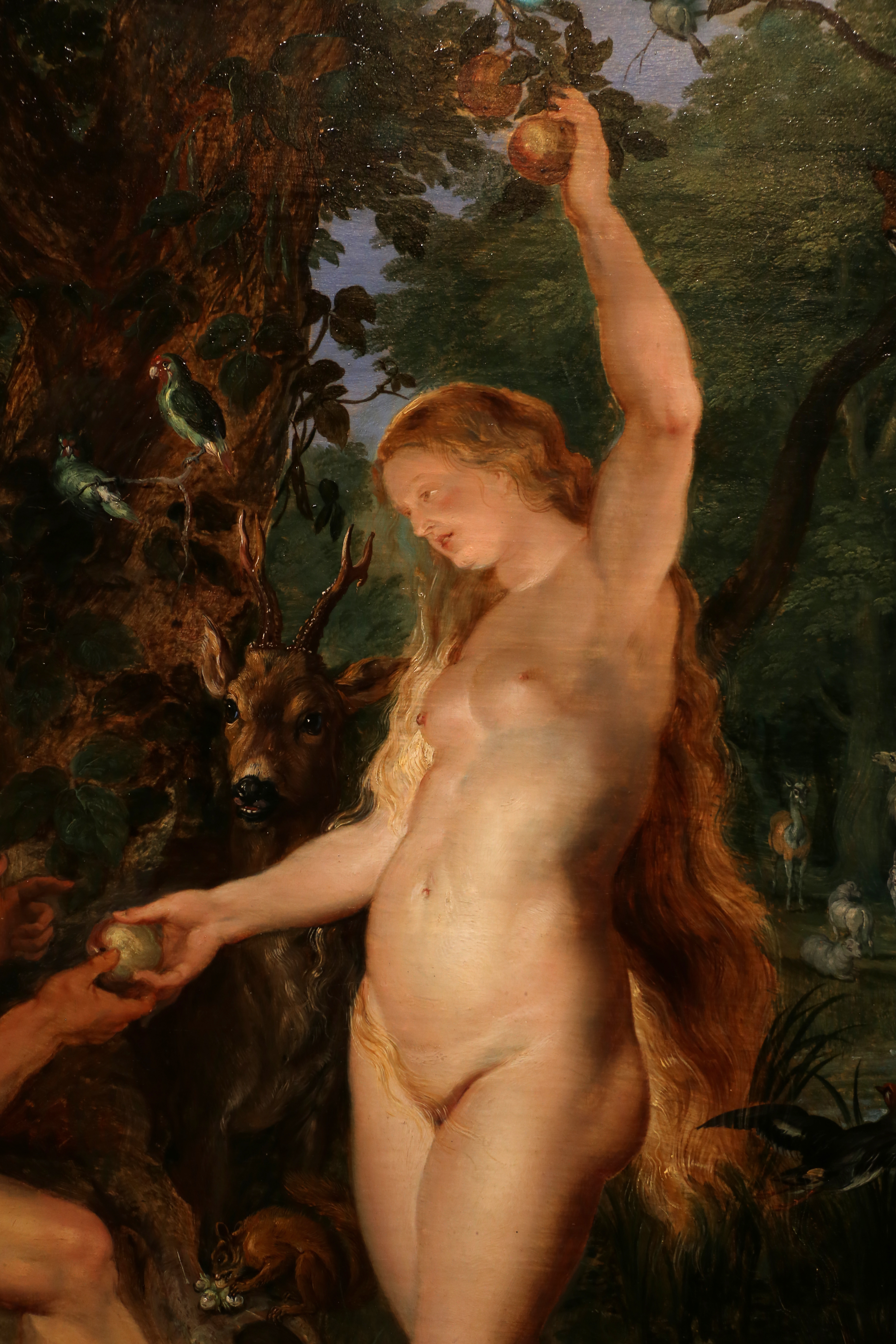
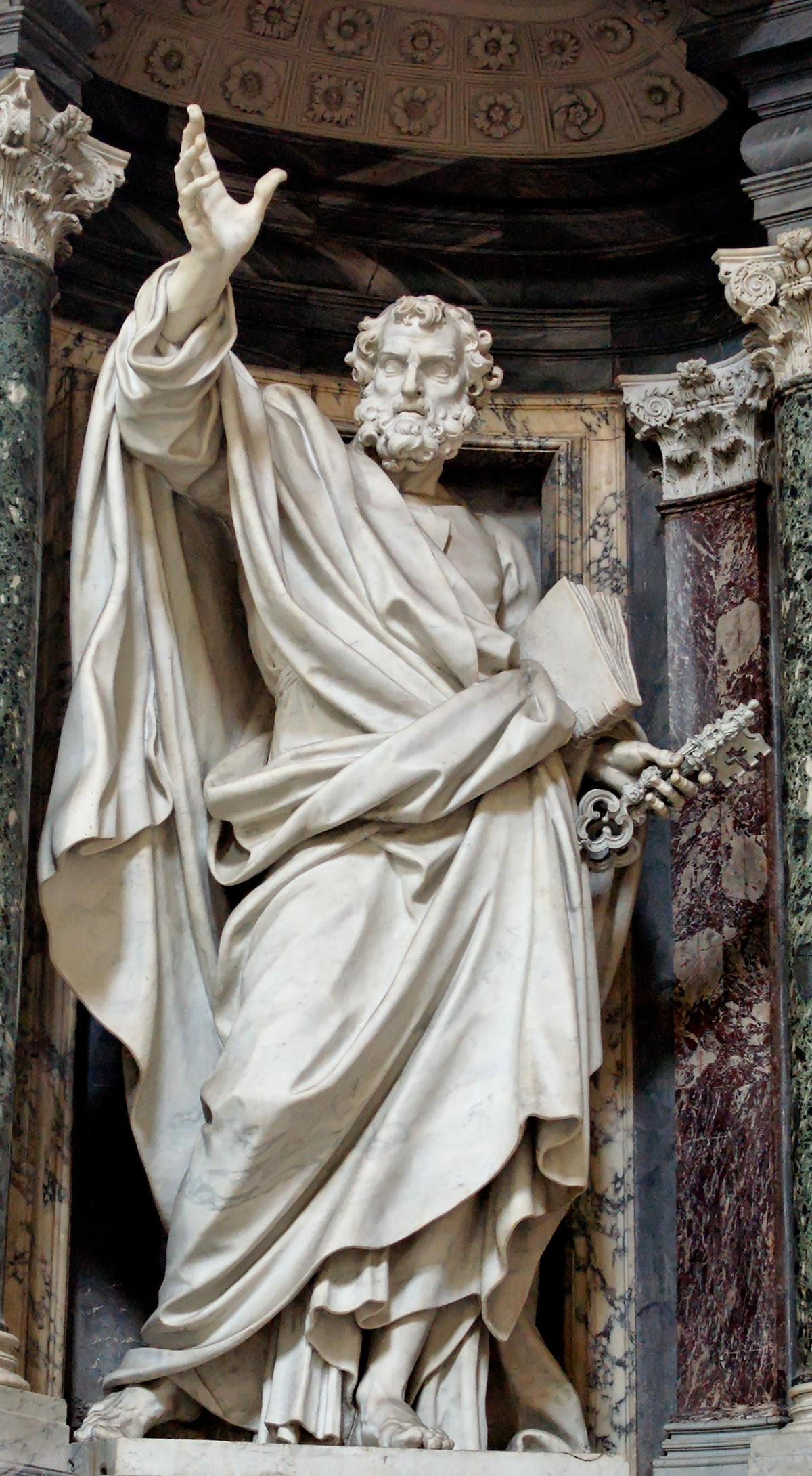
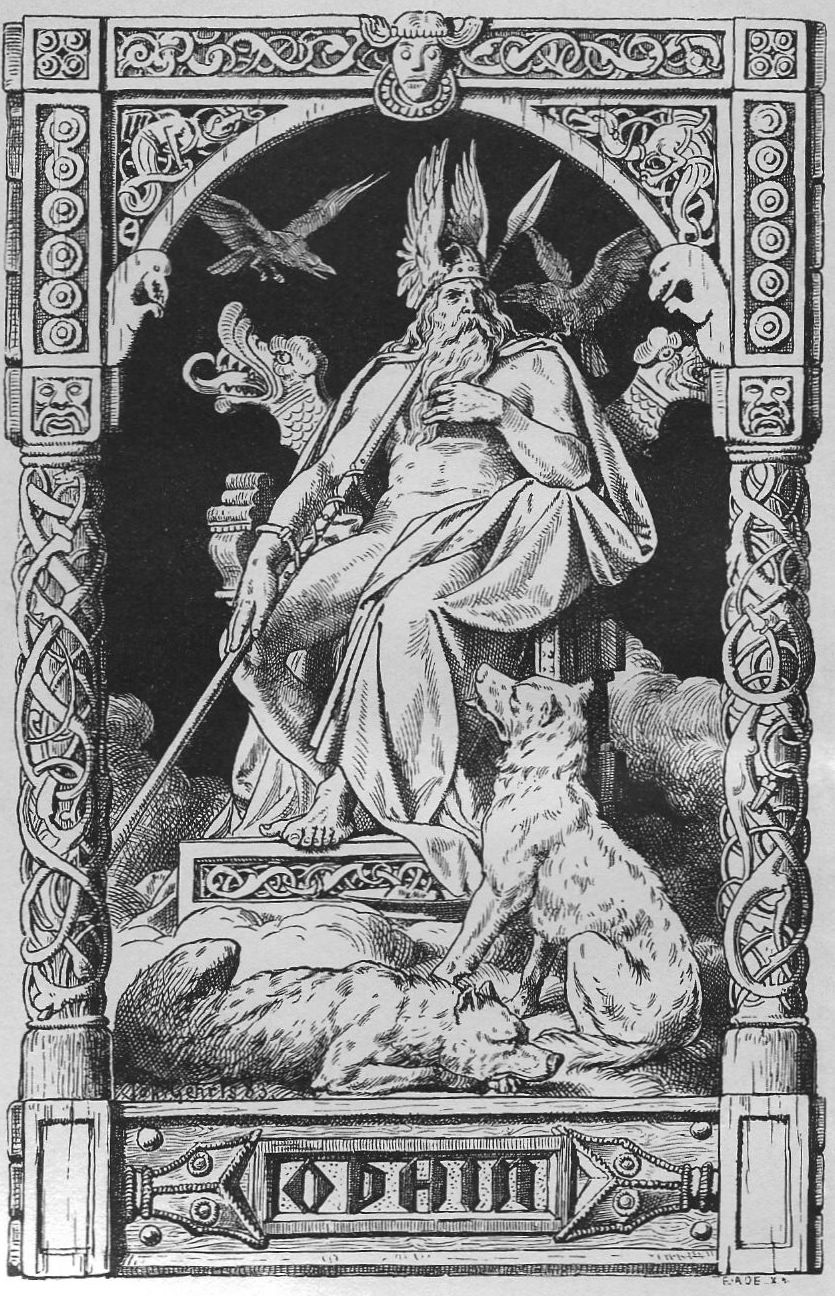
The characteristics, number and modes of the Evas have been compared to the biblical figure of Eve, the twelve apostles and the berserkr, warriors devoted to Odin.

Eva's pilots are called Children. According to writers Kazuhisa Fujie and Martin Foster, the choice of the word may refer to the expression "children of God" mentioned in the New Testament. The term remains in the plural even in the case of a single subject in the Japanese version, which for the film books of the series constitutes a reference to the various clones of Rei Ayanami. According to Gualtiero Cannarsi, the choice to keep the term in the plural is an homage to Tomino's Ideon series. Critics have noted how mecha-related terms such as Umbilical Cable, Children, the name Eva itself, and LCL, similar to amniotic fluid, are related to motherhood. Others, including Oguro and Virginie Nebbia, have associated the cockpit with the image of a womb; the berserk Eva-01 has therefore been linked to the image of an overprotective mother who prevents her child from becoming independent. Shinji himself notices in the series that the Eva's cockpit smells like blood. Critic Mariana Ortega noted how Asuka in the fourteenth episode compares Eva to a mother's womb and breast, and Shinji in the twentieth episode curls up in a fetal position inside the cockpit; according to her, the mother figure in Evangelion thus becomes literally and metaphorically cannibalistic.

Several critics and scholars of Japanese animation have highlighted the unconventional design of the Evangelion units and linked the mecha to the concept of motherhood. Scholar Alba G. Torrents, in particular, connected Eva-01 to Jacques Lacan's psychoanalytic theories. The A10 nerve (A10 神経, A10 shinkei), the main synchronization nerve of the Evangelion neural interface system, has been compared by official material to real nerves that are connected to emotions such as anxiety, fear, happiness, and pleasure, and play an important role in relation to the emotional perception of love. The term nerve is improper, since it is a simplification used in the operative language of Nerv; the acronym A10 indicates the ventral tegmental area, otherwise called area A10. According to Protoculture Addicts magazine, "when humans fall in love or feel close to their family, the part of the brain labeled A-10 comes into play. Strangely, the pilots of Evas have to use this part of their brains to merge with their Eva. That makes them warriors of love, with the power of love to protect their loved ones". According to Yoshiyuki Sadamoto, character designer of the series, "the power of love drives this weapon of mass destruction".

Critics have analyzed Evangelion units, noting how they are organic entities and not machines, and classified them as cyborgs instead of robots. Anno said in 1996 that the Evangelions are not really robots, but giants, describing them as modified humans who move via artificial muscles. During an event in 2021, he also described Evangelion as a "robotic anime" (ロボットアニメ, robot anime), surprising Shinji's voice actress Megumi Ogata. American writer Susan J. Napier has interpreted the Angels as a representation of the Other and the Evas as a metaphor for the Self that Shinji is called upon to confront in his own personal growth process. Critics and official publications compared the red core in the center of the chest and the limit of operation of the units to Ultraman. Comic Book Resources's Timothy Donohoo similarly compared the Evangelions to the Ideon from Yoshiyuki Tomino's series of the same name; Donohoo noted how both mecha have a divine nature, seemingly unlimited energy sources, and the ability to read the emotions of their pilots, trying to protect them. Carl Gustav Horn traced influences to Super Robot 28 and Giant Robo. The Entry Plug and Type D equipment, used by Asuka in the tenth episode of the series, have also been juxtaposed with the works of Kenji Yanobe. The Evangelion has been interpreted as a metaphor for the series, produced through emotional efforts by Anno during a difficult time in his life; the constant questions of Shinji, the director's alter ego, who continually wonders why to board the Eva-01 and must make himself emotionally independent from the humanoid, have been interpreted as a symbolic representation of the author's relationship with his work. In the last two episodes Shinji wonders what the reason is for piloting the Eva. According to Sadamoto, the episodes would not focus on him, but on Anno, the true protagonist of the episodes, while mangaka Kentaro Takekuma interpreted the act of boarding the Eva as a metaphor for the production of an anime.

== Cultural impact ==
=== Popularity and critical reception ===
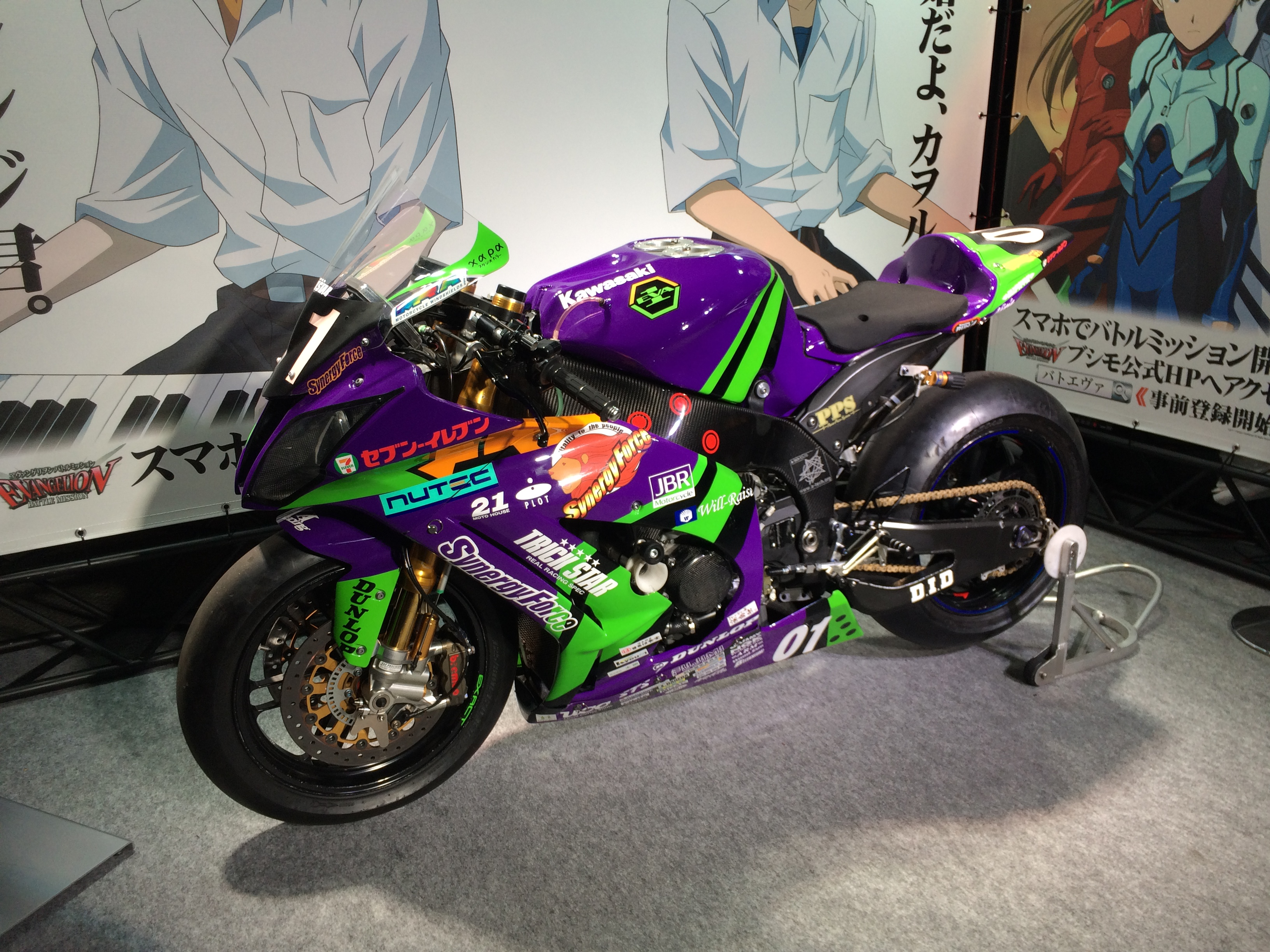
An Evangelion-themed motorcycle at the Tokyo Game Show 2014

Yamashita's mecha design was praised by John Beam of Animation Planet magazine, Protoculture Addicts and Martin Theron, a reviewer for the Anime News Network website, who stated, "The mecha designs [presented in Neon Genesis Evangelion] are among the most distinctive ever produced for an anime series, with sleek, lithe appearances that look monstrous, fearsome, and nimble rather than boxy and knight-like." Comic Book Resources appreciated the Eva-01, which was described as one of the most iconic mechas outside of the Gundam franchise. The same website listed the Eva-13 among the top ten mechas of the 2010s. For Hajime Isayama, author of Attack on Titan, the design of the mechas is "cool in a way unlike anything that came before it". He particularly praised how Anno directed the animation of the laser beams; according to him, the series is also "jam-packed with the joy of animated expression". Manga author Katsuhiro Otomo made similar statements.

Screen Rant praised the mechas and fights, especially those against Israfel, Zeruel, and the Eva Series. According to Erroll Maas, writer for TheGamer, due to the "immense popularity" of the series the Eva-01 became an "internationally recognizable" mecha. In 2010, Yahoo! Japan conducted a survey on Evangelion and its eponymous mecha. Fans of the series were asked if they would enjoy building a 1:1 scale model of an Evangelion and which units they would take as a model. In the first question, the answer was almost unanimously in the affirmative; in the second question, Unit 01 was chosen, with 78% of the total votes. A similar result was recorded in 2016, when the website Charapedia asked its users which machine that appeared in a Japanese animation series they wished to use or pilot; Eva-01 was the second most popular answer, with almost four hundred preferences.

=== Merchandise ===
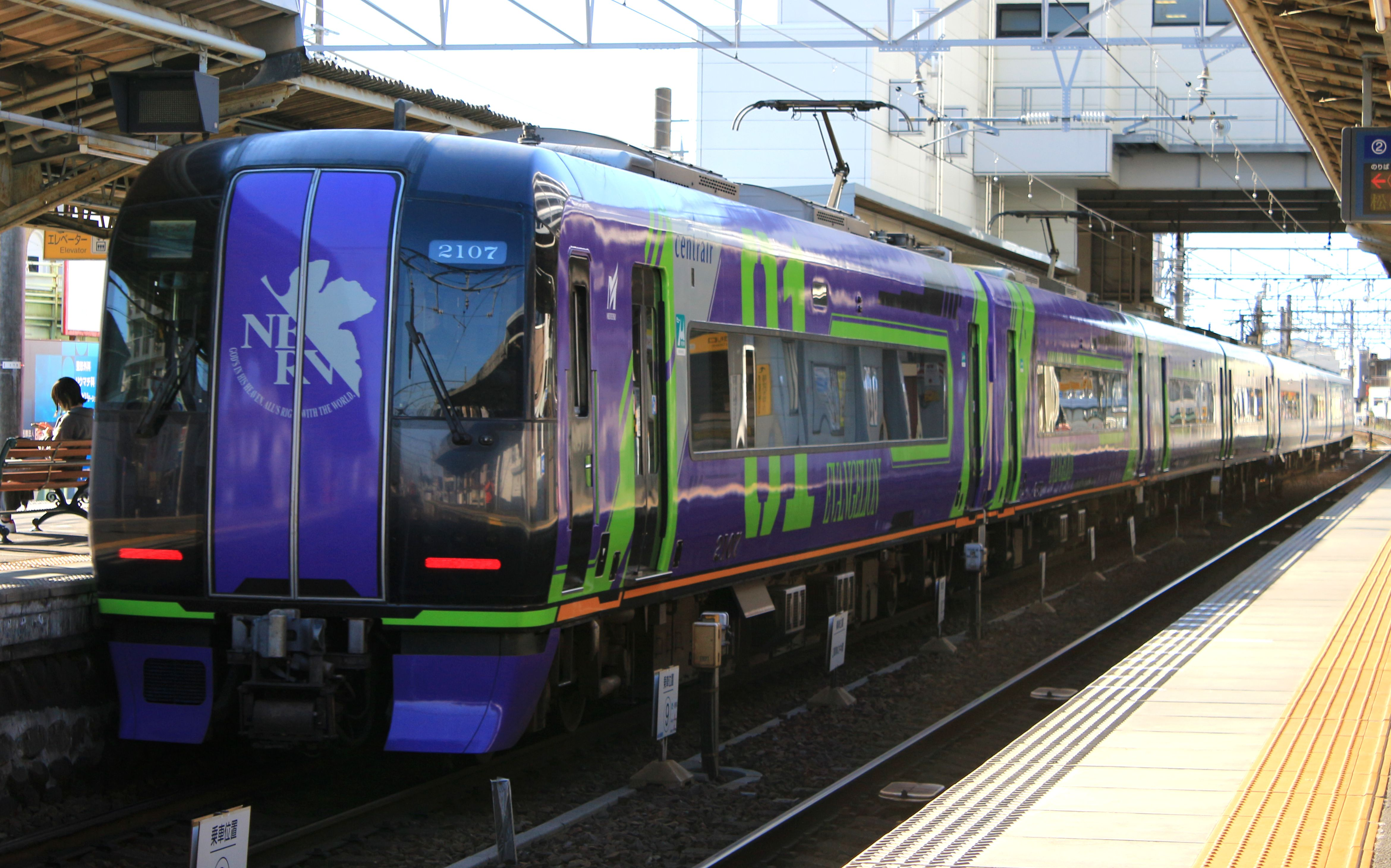
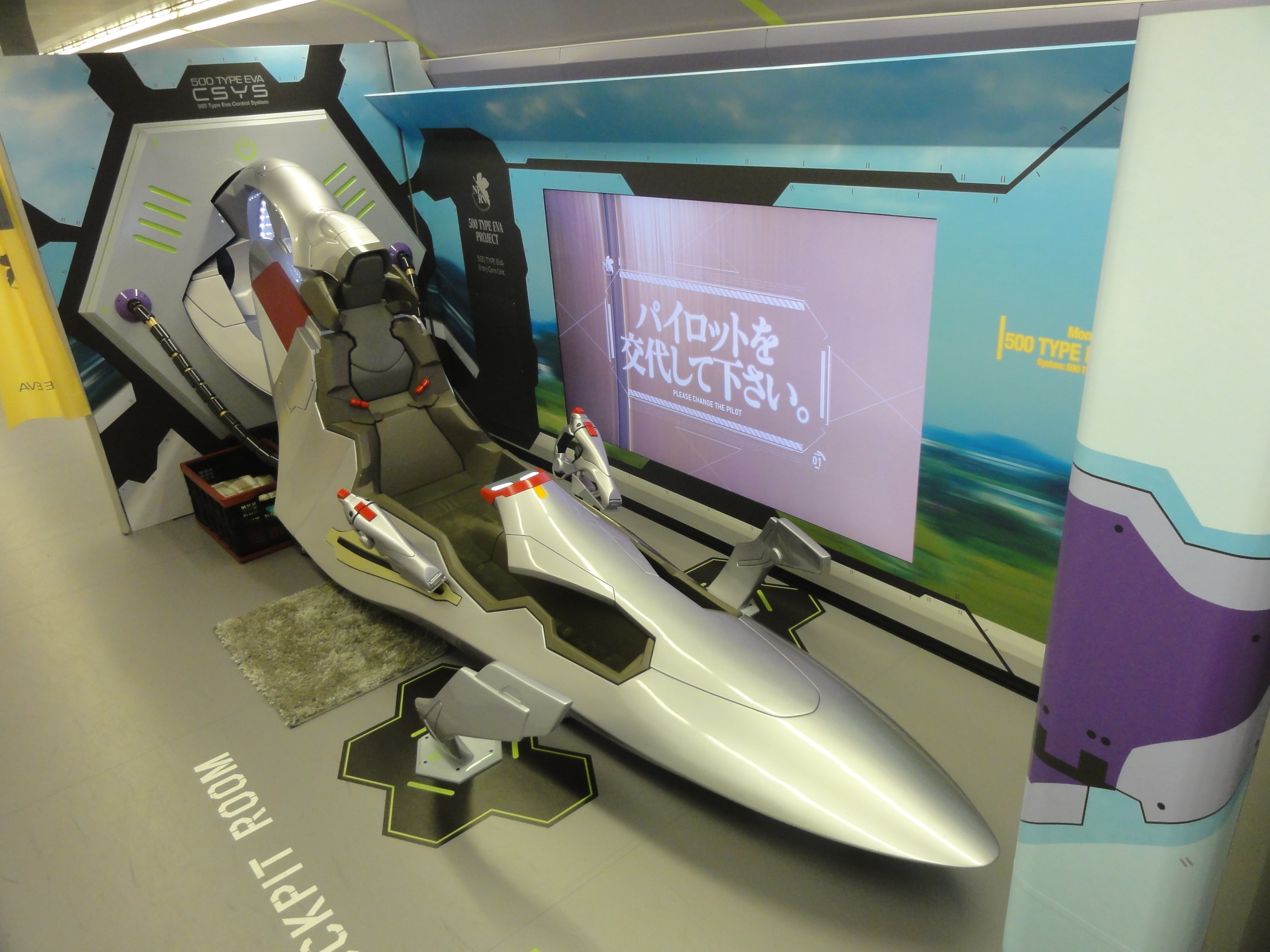
Left, an Eva-01-inspired train in Nagoya's Konomiya Station. At right, reproduction of an Entry Plug in the Shinkansein 500 Type Eva train.

According to the writer Kazuhisa Fujie and the Italian researcher Guido Tavassi, at first the toys and the various products on Neon Genesis Evangelion made little money, outclassed by the sales of Rei Ayanami's action figures, "and even Bandai was reluctant to market the models of the too unusual and disturbing mecha". Within a year from the first airing, there was an upsurge of interest in Evangelion, and, after some initial hesitation, Bandai launched "at full speed" to produce toys and models of the series. The mecha's image was used for consumer goods such as Adidas shoes, wine bottles and snacks, bags, sportswear and accessories, sweatshirts, gloves, underwear, children's clothes and tamagotchi models. Evangelion units were also used in various video games based on the original animated series, as well as some media detached from the Evangelion franchise, such as in the video games Keri hime sweets, Summons Board, Puyopuyo!! Quest, Puzzle & Dragons, and Super Robot Wars.

To celebrate the release of the film Evangelion 1.0: You Are (Not) Alone in 2007, Studio Akiyama put a giant figure of Eva-01 about two meters high at the price of one million yen (about ten thousand US dollars) on sale. In 2010, the formation of a Japanese car team called Evangelion RT-01 apr Corolla for the Super GT championship was announced. At the team's first official competition, the group's Toyota Corolla Axio was repainted with the Evangelion RT-01's color scheme; the two racers, Kōki Saga and Kosuke Matsuura, competed wearing two reproductions of the suit used by Shinji. Over the next two years, the first car was joined by a repainted Porsche 911 GT3 RS emulating the design of Unit 02 and two Kawasaki Ninja ZX-10R motorcycles with the features of 01 and 02. In November 2014, the Japanese car company Mitsuoka Motors auctioned off a Mitsuoka Orochi inspired by the Eva-01 design, selling for a final price of 16 million yen (approximately $130,000); the event received enough media attention that the company's president, Akio Mitsuoka, entered into an agreement with the car's owner to display it at the Mitsuoka Gallery Azabu in Tokyo for an entire week. In 2015, it was announced that a high-speed train inspired by the design of the Eva-01 would be built, with both Yamashita and Anno being involved in its construction. The train went into operation in November; West Japan Railway Company later decided to extend service until spring 2018. A new Eva-01 themed train was produced in 2020 and departed from Nagoya's Chubu Centrair International Airport.

==== Reproductions ====
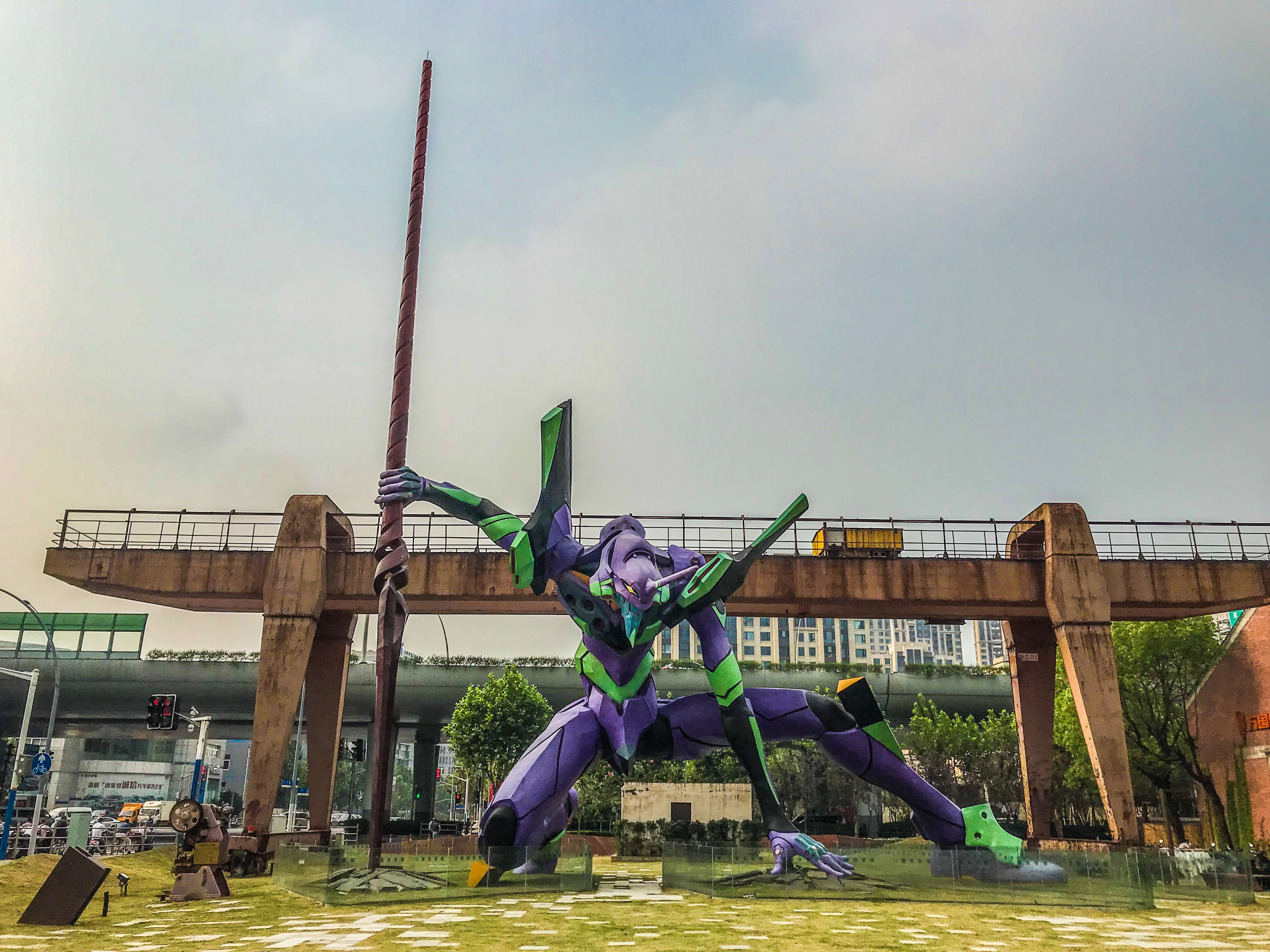
Statue of Eva-01 in Shanghai

In 2010, a faithful reproduction of the bust of Eva-01 was unveiled in the Fuji-Q HighLand amusement park, along with a full-scale model of the Entry Plug. Between 2011 and 2015, projects to build a 1:1 scale replica of the Eva-02 boss in The Beast mode, a hotel room inspired by the Unit 00 Entry Plug, and a roller coaster designed and built based on the 01 design were announced. However, due to the 2011 Tōhoku earthquake and tsunami, work on the 02 statue was postponed indefinitely.

In 2015, a limited-time event dedicated exclusively to Neon Genesis Evangelion was inaugurated at the Expasa service area in Ashigara, Shizuoka Prefecture, where a six-meter-tall statue of Eva-01, the largest in the world, was displayed. In 2016, the record was passed to a giant reproduction of 01 with a to-scale model of Longinus' spear in his hands, built in Shanghai. The statue was built by Khara, the Heitao Interactive company, and the Shanghai Character License Administrative Corporation. At 24.8 meters high, it entered the Guinness World Records in a special category as "the largest Evangelion in the world". In 2020, Nagoya promoted an event named Evangelion Chukyo Area Project to celebrate the release of Evangelion 3.0+1.0, the last installment of Rebuild; a golden statue of Eva-01 was unveiled at Chūbu-Centrair Airport along with a six-meter-high reproduction of the unit at the city's Global Gate Complex. To coincide with the release of the feature film, a special Evangelion-themed event was held at the Tokyo Sky Tree in 2021, during which the lights of the tower were illuminated in the colors of the Evangelion units from the Rebuild.

=== Legacy ===
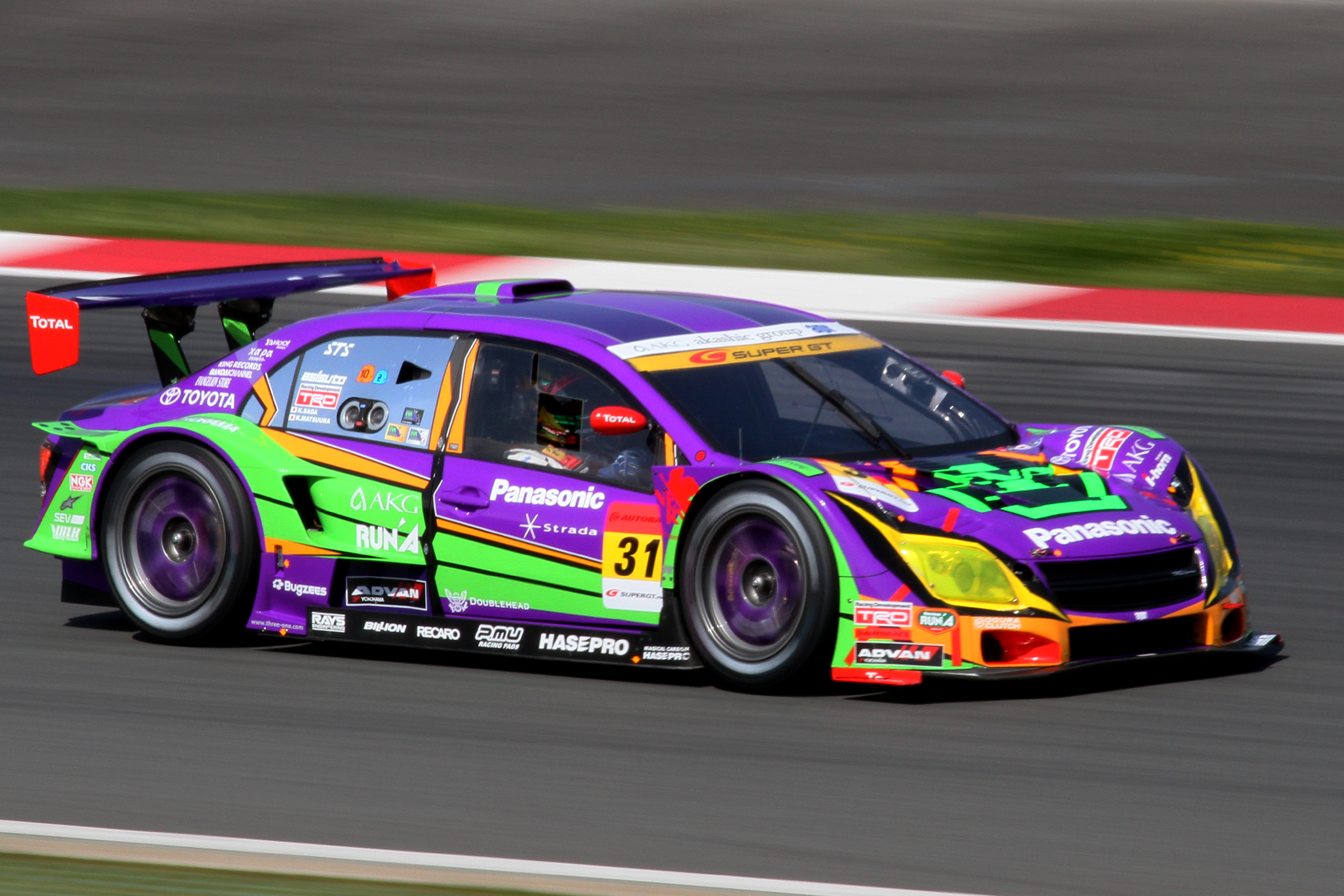
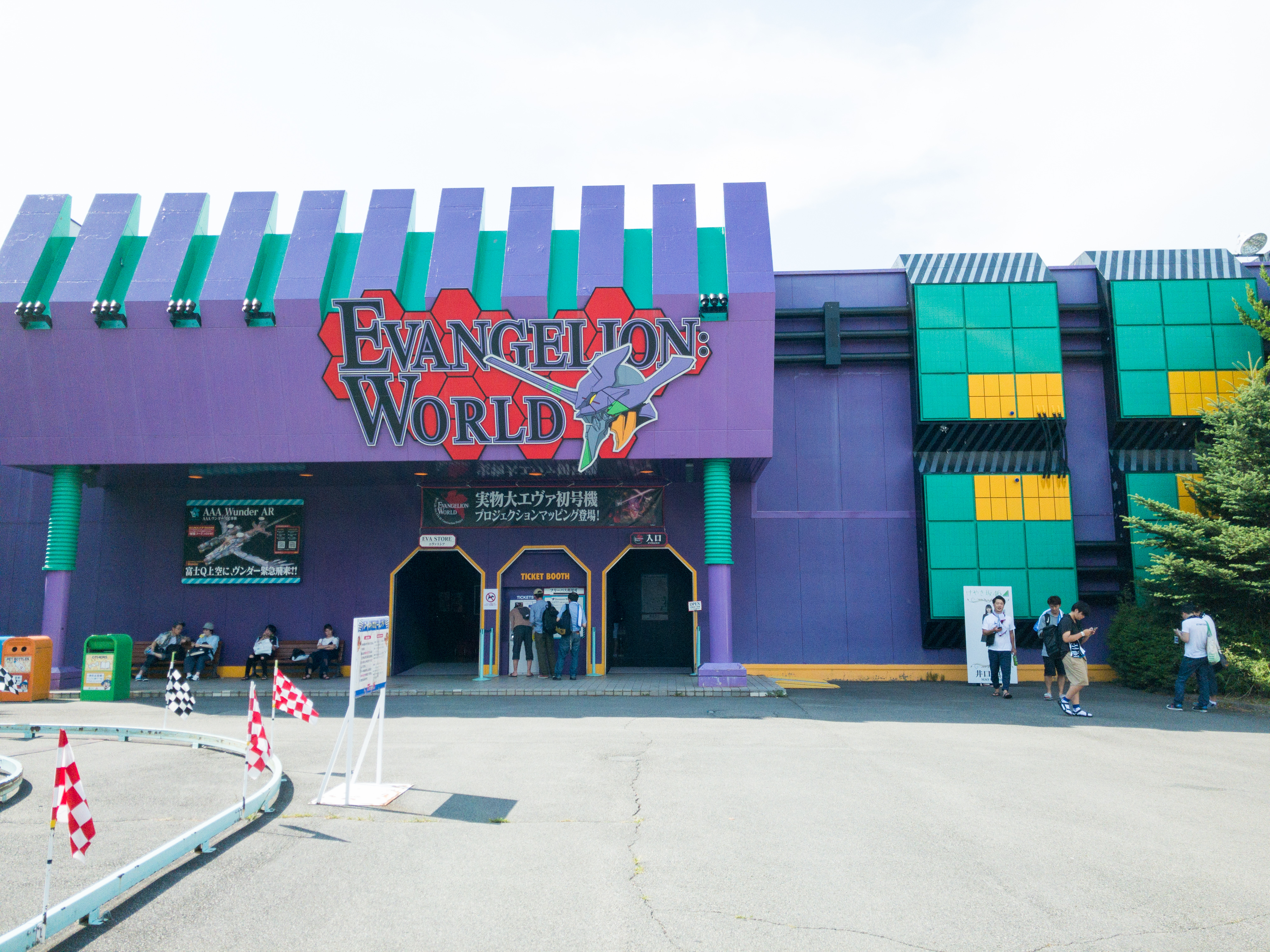
Left, Evangelion Racing Group's Toyota Corolla inspired by the Eva-01 colors. Right, entry to Evangelion Fuji-Q Highland World, an Evangelion-themed amusement park in Fujiyoshida

According to scholar Guido Tavassi, the "revolutionary" mecha design can be counted among the innovations introduced by Neon Genesis Evangelion, "which, on the one hand, brings the Eva units closer to the human figure, but on the other hand proposes a complete abstraction of the forms of the enemies, the Angels, with a choice that will have an enormous impact on the design of subsequent series of the genre". Maya Phillips, a writer for The New Yorker magazine, credited Evangelion with redefining the mecha genre and the relationship between pilot and fighting machine. The Evas, according to Phillips, introduce more ambiguity compared to the mecha of the past, being difficult to classify and halfway between Nagai's super robots and Gundam-like real robots; according to the writer, the anime, although indebted to the past series, "was perhaps the first to imagine the human as machine, and vice versa". The new element for Phillips is the frightening and dangerous nature of the humanoids, unknown until then to mainstream anime.

Eva-01's design inspired Nobuhiro Watsuki for the appearance of the giant Fuji, one of the characters in his work Rurouni Kenshin. Neon Genesis Evangelion's influence has also been traced by critics to the mecha designs of series that came later, such as Brain Powerd, Gasaraki, Dual! Parallel Trouble Adventure, Devadasy and Reideen, a 2003 remake of the 1975 series Brave Raideen. The fight sequence between Asuka's Eva-02 and the nine Eva Series present in End was an inspiration for animators such as Yoshimichi Kameda and Yokota Takumi, character designer of Love Live! Nijigasaki High School Idol Club. The design of the Digimon Argomon was inspired by Eva-01 The Edge of Spider-Geddon also introduces mechas called SP//dr and Ven#m, which are visually similar to Evangelion units.

Possible homages to the series' mechas have also been traced in Heroes of the Storm's Genji, D.Va's mecha from Overwatch, the Sentinels from the Marvel comic book Mystique, an episode of the US cartoon Invader Zim, the final form of Carnage Kabuto from One-Punch Man and Alexandrite from Steven Universe. According to USgamer, there is also a mention of Type D equipment in the Gold Saucer in Final Fantasy VII. ComicBook.com similarly interpreted a scene from My Hero Academia in which the character of Muscular mentions that he has "twelve thousand layers" of his muscle armor as a reference to a line from The End of Evangelion in which Asuka says that Eva-02 has "twelve thousand plates of fortified armor"; the website also noted that My Hero Academia author Kohei Horikoshi declared himself a fan of Evangelion. Pacific Rim has also been compared to Evangelion by critics; giant robots with aesthetic similarities to Evangelion units appear in the film, piloted via a neural connection aided by a special liquid that is similar to LCL. Guillermo del Toro and Travis Beacham, director and screenwriter of the feature film, respectively, have stated that they were not directly influenced by Neon Genesis Evangelion, saying that they only saw the series after they had already conceived Pacific Rim. In 2016, actress Ayame Goriki cosplayed as Eva-01 in a preview of the first episode of Rental no koi, a Japanese television drama that aired in January 2017. A group of researchers from Tokyo Medical and Dental University in 2021 published a study on a liquid capable of delivering oxygen to mice and pigs through the anus; the technique was dubbed by Takanori Takebe, author of the study, as the "EVA method" (enteral ventilation via anus) after the Eva units.
